= Figuralchor Frankfurt =

Mixed choir in Frankfurt, Germany

- Choir
- Also known as: Figuralchor des Hessischen Rundfunks
- Origin: Frankfurt, Hesse, Germany
- Founded: 1966
- Founder: Alois Ickstadt
- Genre: Mixed radio choir
- Members: 60
- Chief conductor: Paul Leonard Schäffer
- Affiliation: Hessischer Rundfunk
- Website: www.figuralchor-frankfurt.de

Figuralchor Frankfurt is a mixed choir in Frankfurt, Hesse, Germany. It was founded in 1966 as a youth choir for the broadcaster Hessischer Rundfunk by Alois Ickstadt, who conducted it for 45 years. From 1977 to the 1990s, the choir was known as Figuralchor des Hessischen Rundfunks. It performs in concerts, radio productions and recordings, with a focus on a cappella music, but has also participated in joint symphonic productions such as Mahler's Symphony of a Thousand for the opening of the Alte Oper concert hall in 1981. The choir has been conducted by Paul Leonard Schäffer since 2016.

== History ==
The choral conductor and pedagogue Alois Ickstadt, who had founded the children's choir for the broadcaster Hessischer Rundfunk (hr) in 1961, founded a youth choir, which would become the Figuralchor, for the station in 1966, according to his concept to educate choral singers from childhood to adulthood in both vocal training and background information. The name Figuralchor was derived from figural music, mostly polyphonic music of the 17th and 18th century.

Ickstadt conducted the Figuralchor in concerts, radio productions and recordings. The first Figuralchor performances, beginning in 1966, were broadcasts. The ensemble sang its first concert for a live audience In 1970, performing motets at St. Leonhard. The choir's repertoire is focused on sacred and secular a cappella motets, but it also performs symphonic works and oratorios, such as Mahler's Eighth Symphony in the opening concert of the Alte Oper on 28 August 1981, conducted by Michael Gielen. In the 1990s, the choir no longer received funding from the broadcaster and changed its name to Figuralchor Frankfurt, but it still has appeared in broadcasts.

When Ickstadt retired in 2011, Martin Lücker succeeded him. Paul Leonard Schäffer became conductor in 2016, the year of the choir's 50th anniversary, after having assisted Lücker for three years. Schäffer conducted the choir in a festive concert at the Clara Schumann Saal of Dr. Hoch's Konservatorium on 16 September 2016 in a performance of Schubert's Mass in E-flat major. The choir performed Bach's Christmas Oratorio at the Alte Oper in 2017.

== Recordings ==
- Mahler: Eighth Symphony, conducted by Michael Gielen, with soloists Faye Robinson, Margaret Anne Marshall, Hildegard Heichele, Ortrun Wenkel, Hildegard Laurich, Mallory Walker, Richard Stilwell, Simon Estes, choirs Frankfurter Kantorei, Frankfurter Singakademie, Limburger Domsingknaben, Frankfurter Opern- und Museumsorchester, Sony (CD), live performance on 28 August 1981
- Bach: Nun komm, der Heiden Heiland, BWV 62, with Hildegard Heichele, Ria Bollen; Tenor, Heiner Hopfner, Ernst Gerold Schramm, Kammerorchester Alfred Sous, Figuralchor des Hessischen Rundfunks (radio, c. 1981), Melisma 726
- Bach: Mass in B minor, Ulrike Sonntag, Alison Browner, Adalbert Kraus, Ernst Gerold Schramm (live recording at St. Gallus, Flörsheim, May 1987), Melisma
- Haydn: Die Jahreszeiten. F 669 500/01. Frankfurter Museumsgesellschaft. Frankfurt, 1987.
- Bach: St John Passion, Sonntag, Browner, Kraus, Schramm, Collegium Instrumentale Alois Kottmann (live recording at St. Gallus, Flörsheim), Opus 27042. Cappella Wiesbaden 1989
- Gallus-Konzerte in der Barockkirche zu Flörsheim am Main, works by Mozart, Mendelssohn, Joseph Rheinberger and others. Opus 27035. Cappella Wiesbaden 1989
- Zemlinsky: Der Traumgörge. Capriccio 10 241/42. Delta Music. Frechen 1989
- Gallus-Konzerte Flörsheim am Main, works by Mozart, Dieterich Buxtehude, Mendelssohn, Bach, Haydn, Rheinberger and others, Sonntag, Browner, Kraus, Schramm (live recording at St. Gallus, Flörsheim, Opus 27042. Cappella Wiesbaden 1990
- Orff: Carmina burana, Frankfurter Museumsgesellschaft. Frankfurt am Main 1992
- Brahms: Zigeunerlieder, Schwann Musica Mundi 3-16 16-2. Koch International. Munich 1992
- Orff: Trionfi. Wergo WER 6275-2. Schott Wergo Music Media. Mainz 1995
- Andrei Volkonsky: Der 148. Psalm and others. Wergo WER 6601-2. Schott Wergo Music Media. Mainz 1996
- Gedenk-Konzert, works by Brahms, Mendelssohn, Franz Schubert. Melisma 7139/40-2. Cappella Wiesbaden 1998
- Brahms: Ein deutsches Requiem. Melisma 7177-2. Cappella Wiesbaden 2001
- Mendelssohn: Elias. Frankfurter Museumsgesellschaft. Frankfurt am Main 2001.

== Literature ==
- Herbert Schneider, ed. (1994). "Aspekte der Zeit in der Musik – Alois Ickstadt zum 65. Geburtstag". Musikwissenschaftliche Publikationen. 4. Zürich, New York. ISBN 3-487-10517-9. "Olms. Hildesheim"
