= Alois Ickstadt =

German composer, pianist and music educator (born 1930)

- Born: 22 September 1930 (age 95)
- Education: Musikhochschule Frankfurt; Johann Wolfgang Goethe-Universität Frankfurt am Main
- Occupation: Musicologist
- Organizations: Hessischer Rundfunk; Kinderchor Frankfurt; Figuralchor Frankfurt; Hochschule für Musik und Darstellende Kunst Frankfurt am Main
- Awards: Ehrenplakette der Stadt Frankfurt am Main; Orlando di Lasso Medal

Alois Ickstadt (born 22 September 1930) is a German pianist, choral conductor, university professor and composer. He was professor at the Musikhochschule Frankfurt. He promoted choral singing from children's choir to adult groups for the state broadcaster Hessischer Rundfunk, namely the Figuralchor Frankfurt which he founded in 1966 and conducted until 2011.

== Life ==
Ickstadt studied music pedagogy at the Musikhochschule Frankfurt. He also studied piano with Erich Flinsch, composition with Kurt Hessenberg and conducting with Walther Davisson and Karl Maria Zwißler. Interested in cultural relevance, he also studied German, musicology, philosophy and history at the Johann Wolfgang Goethe-Universität Frankfurt am Main. He took classes with Theodor Adorno and Max Horkheimer, whose philosophy shaped his life.

During his studies, he worked as a pianist for radio stations, with a focus on contemporary music, collaborating with conductors such as Pierre Boulez, Dean Dixon, Sixten Ehrling and Georg Solti. He also accompanied singers in recitals.

Beginning in the early 1960s, Ickstadt created a new concept for working with choirs, in collaboration with Hessischer Rundfunk (HR), the Hesse state radio and television broadcaster. In 1961, he founded the children's choir of the HR, Kinderchor Frankfurt; an adult choir, the Figuralchor Frankfurt, was formed in 1966. The concept was to begin educating choral singers when they were children and continue with them into adulthood, not only providing systematic vocal training but also expanding their general musical knowledge. Ickstadt conducted the Figuralchor in concerts, radio productions and recordings. The first Figuralchor performances, beginning in 1966, were broadcasts; the ensemble sang its first concert for a live audience in 1970, performing motets at St. Leonhard church. Ickstadt conducted the choir until 2011.

Ickstadt was a professor at the Musikhochschule Frankfurt from 1968 until his retirement in 1995.

== Awards ==
- Ehrenplakette der Stadt Frankfurt am Main (9 June 2006)
- Orlando di Lasso Medal (22 November 2015)

== Work ==
=== Compositions ===
- Eppstein-Kantate, three-part cantata for choir and orchestra (Middle Ages, Thirty-Years War, Modern Times), for the 650th anniversary of Eppstein, 1968
- Kritzel-Kratzel will zum Mond. Spannendes Hörspiel., audio play, 25711 XAW. Ariola Eurodisc. Munich 1979
- Kritzel-Kratzel und was nun?Spannendes Hörspiel., audio play, 25712 XAW. Ariola Eurodisc. Munich 1979
- Richard Rudolf Klein: Kinder musizieren. Schulwerk für das erste Zusammenspiel. Fidulafon 1165. Fidula. Boppard and Salzburg 1981

=== Recordings ===
- Bach: Nun komm, der Heiden Heiland, BWV 62, with Hildegard Heichele, Ria Bollen; tenor, Heiner Hopfner, Ernst Gerold Schramm, Kammerorchester Alfred Sous, Figuralchor des Hessischen Rundfunks (radio, c. 1981), Melisma 726
- Bach: Mass in B minor, Ulrike Sonntag, Alison Browner, Adalbert Kraus, Ernst Gerold Schramm (live recording at St. Gallus, Flörsheim, May 1987), Melisma.
- Haydn: Die Jahreszeiten. F 669 500/01. Frankfurter Museumsgesellschaft. Frankfurt, 1987.
- Bach: St John Passion, Sonntag, Browner, Kraus, Schramm, Collegium Instrumentale Alois Kottmann (live recording at St. Gallus, Flörsheim), Opus 27042. Cappella Wiesbaden 1989
- Gallus-Konzerte in der Barockkirche zu Flörsheim am Main, works by Mozart, Mendelssohn, Joseph Rheinberger and others. Opus 27035. Cappella Wiesbaden 1989
- Zemlinsky: Der Traumgörge. Capriccio 10 241/42. Delta Music. Frechen 1989
- Gallus-Konzerte Flörsheim am Main, works by Mozart, Dieterich Buxtehude, Mendelssohn, Bach, Haydn, Rheinberger and others, Sonntag, Browner, Kraus, Schramm (live recording at St. Gallus, Flörsheim, Opus 27042. Cappella Wiesbaden 1990
- Orff: Carmina Burana, Frankfurter Museumsgesellschaft. Frankfurt am Main 1992.
- Brahms: Zigeunerlieder, Schwann Musica Mundi 3-16 16-2. Koch International. Munich 1992.
- Orff: Trionfi. Wergo WER 6275-2. Schott Wergo Music Media. Mainz 1995
- Andrei Volkonsky: Der 148. Psalm and others. Wergo WER 6601-2. Schott Wergo Music Media. Mainz 1996.
- Gedenk-Konzert, works by Brahms, Mendelssohn, Franz Schubert. Melisma 7139/40-2. Cappella Wiesbaden 1998
- Brahms: Ein deutsches Requiem. Melisma 7177-2. Cappella Wiesbaden 2001
- Mendelssohn: Elias. Frankfurter Museumsgesellschaft. Frankfurt am Main 2001.
