= Hildegard Heichele =

Soprano in opera and concert (born 1947)

- Born: September 1947 (age 77); Obernburg, West Germany
- Occupation: Operatic soprano
- Organizations: Oper Frankfurt

Hildegard Heichele (German: ['haɪxɛlɛ]; born September 1947) is a German soprano in opera, concert and recital. A member of the Oper Frankfurt from 1974, she has appeared in major European opera houses, concert halls and international festivals. She is known for Mozart roles such as Susanna, Blonde and Despina. Heichele is featured on opera recordings, including a DVD of Die Fledermaus by Johann Strauss from the Royal Opera House in London, and singing concerts, such as the opening of the Alte Oper with Mahler's Eighth Symphony in 1981.

== Career ==
Born in Obernburg, Heichele studied at the Musikhochschule München from 1966, graduating with the artistic exam in 1970. She made her stage debut already during this time as Jenny in Weill's Aufstieg und Fall der Stadt Mahagonny at the Stadttheater Klagenfurt. She was engaged at the Bavarian State Opera in Munich from 1971.

She became a member of the ensemble of the Oper Frankfurt in 1974, where she sang many Mozart roles such as Susanna in Le nozze di Figaro, Zerlina in Don Giovanni, Ilia in Idomeneo, Blonde in Die Entführung aus dem Serail, Despina in Così fan tutte and Pamina in Die Zauberflöte. Appearing with Roland Hermann as the Count and Margit Neubauer as Cherubino, she was described as a pert Susanna with a flawless voice ("makellos singende, schnippische Susanna"). She took part in the first performance at the Oper Frankfurt of Rameau's Castor et Pollux in 1980.

Heichele appeared as a guest at opera houses in Europe, in 1974 at the Volksoper in Vienna as Susanna, at the Vienna State Opera as Marzelline in Beethoven's Fidelio and as Blonde, at the Opéra-Comique in Paris as Despina, and at La Monnaie in Brussels as Susanna in 1984, among others. The same year, she appeared at the Bayreuth Festival as the Voice of the Forest Bird in Siegfried. She sang the role of Adele in Die Fledermaus by Johann Strauss at the Royal Opera House in London in 1983, conducted by Plácido Domingo, alongside Kiri Te Kanawa as Rosalinde, among others. The production was staged by Humphrey Burton and recorded as a television film and on DVD. In 1988, she appeared as Elsa in Wagner's Lohengrin at the Staatsoper Hannover, and as Elisabeth in Tannhäuser at the Nationaltheater Mannheim.

In concert, she appeared in Mahler's Eighth Symphony, conducted by Michael Gielen, with seven other soloists, three choirs and the Frankfurter Opern- und Museumsorchester, at the opening of the Alte Oper concert hall on 28 August 1981, which was recorded live.

== Recordings ==
Heichele recorded for the broadcaster Hessischer Rundfunk Bach's cantata Nun komm, der Heiden Heiland, BWV 62, with soloists Ria Bollen, Heiner Hopfner and Ernst Gerold Schramm, Kammerorchester Alfred Sous, Figuralchor des Hessischen Rundfunks, conducted by Alois Ickstadt, c. 1981, Melisma 726 In 1984, she recorded Bach's Magnificat and Handel's Utrecht Te Deum with Helrun Gardow, Paul Esswood, Kurt Equiluz, Robert Holl, the Wiener Sängerknaben and Chorus Viennensis, and the Concentus Musicus Wien conducted by Nikolaus Harnoncourt.

- Mahler: Eighth Symphony, conducted by Michael Gielen, with soloists Faye Robinson, Margaret Anne Marshall, Hildegard Heichele, Ortrun Wenkel, Hildegard Laurich, Mallory Walker, Richard Stilwell, Simon Estes, choirs Frankfurter Kantorei, Frankfurter Singakademie, Limburger Domsingknaben, Frankfurter Opern- und Museumsorchester, Sony (CD), live performance on 28 August 1981
