= Margaret Anne Marshall =

Scottish soprano

OBE Margaret Marshall
- Born: Margaret Anne Marshall; January 4, 1949 (age 77); Stirling, Scotland
- Education: Royal Scottish Academy of Music and Drama, Glasgow
- Occupation: Operatic soprano
- Years active: 1975-2009
- Honours: Officer of the Order of the British Empire Doctor of Music, University of St. Andrews

Margaret Anne Marshall OBE (born 4 January 1949) is a Scottish soprano.

Marshall was born in Stirling. Her career started in the 1970s and she has sung a wide range of classical and operatic roles up to her retirement in 2004. She received the James Gulliver Award for Performing Arts in Scotland in 1991, in 1999 she was appointed Officer of the Order of the British Empire in the New Year Honours, and on 23 June 2009 she was awarded an honorary degree of Doctor of Music from the University of St Andrews.

== Biography ==
Margaret Marshall studied singing at the Royal Scottish Academy of Music and Drama in Glasgow with Ena Mitchell, with whom she continued to study after graduating. Awarded a Caird Travelling Scholarship, Marshall travelled to Munich to study with German bass-baritone Hans Hotter, who suggested she enter the ARD International Music Competition in Munich.

Winning first prize in the 1974 ARD Competition, singing Purcell and Bach in the final, launched Marshall's international career that initially focussed on the concert platform. In 1975 she made her recital debut at the Wigmore Hall in London and her Royal Festival Hall debut, in J. S. Bach's St Matthew Passion. She also made her first recording with Rudolf Ewerhardt singing J. C. Bach's Salve Regina and Galuppi's Rapida Cerva. She then participated in the series of recordings of Vivaldi's complete sacred vocal music with the English Chamber Orchestra conducted by Vittorio Negri. She then also recorded Bach's Mass in B minor with Sir Neville Marriner and the Academy of St Martin in the Fields.

Her first operatic role was Euridice in Gluck's Orfeo which she first sang on the concert platform in the Queen Elizabeth Hall with Sir John Eliot Gardiner before making her stage debut in Florence with Riccardo Muti in 1977, a role she subsequently recorded with Muti and the Philharmonia Orchestra. The Italian conductor invited her back to Florence for his first production Le Nozze di Figaro in 1979, in which she sang the role of the Countess.

On the opera platform, Marshall was best known for her interpretation of Mozartian roles. She sang the Countess in Figaro in many of the world's leading opera houses including the Royal Opera House London, La Scala Milan, Wiener Staatsoper and Deutsche Oper Berlin as well as with Scottish Opera. She made her Salzburg Festival debut in 1982 singing Fiordiligi in Così fan tutte with Riccardo Muti and the Vienna Philharmoniker in Michael Hampe's production that remained in the Festival's repertoire until 1991. She also recorded Fiordiligi with Muti and the Vienna Philharmonic. Other opera houses in which she sang Fiordiligi include the Royal Opera House, Frankfurt Opera, Zurich Opera and Scottish Opera.

Other Mozart roles included Pamina (Die Zauberflöte), Vitellia (La clemenza di Tito), Ilia (Idomeneo), Arminda (La finta giardiniera); Donna Elvira and Donna Anna (Don Giovanni). Other roles include Violetta (La traviata), the Marschallin (Der Rosenkavalier), the Countess (Capriccio), Lucio (Tito Manlio), and Hypernmestre (Salieri's Les Danaïdes).

Marshall's concert career, in parallel with her stage performances, included singing with The Berlin Philharmonic Orchestra, Vienna Philharmonic, Vienna Symphony Orchestra, Bayerische Rundfunk Orchester, London Philharmonic, London Symphony Orchestra, Philharmonia Orchestra, the Academy of St Martin in the Fields, Royal Scottish National Orchestra, Scottish Chamber Orchestra, the Orchestre de Paris, New York Philharmonic Orchestra, Boston Symphony Orchestra, Philadelphia Orchestra, Chicago Symphony Orchestra and the Dallas Symphony Orchestra. Conductors she regularly performed with included Claudio Abbado, Riccardo Muti, Sir Neville Marriner, Carlo Maria Giulini, Sir John Eliot Gardiner, Bernard Haitink, Daniel Barenboim, Zubin Mehta, Christian Thielemann, Sir Alexander Gibson, Sir Charles Groves, Sir Adrian Boult, Jeffrey Tate, Michael Gielen, Gary Bertini, Vittorio Negri, and Georg Fischer

Marshall excelled in Baroque music, where her repertoire included Bach's Mass in B minor, St Matthew Passion, St John Passion, Jauchzet Gott in allen Landen and many other cantatas; Handel's Messiah, Jephtha and Dixit Dominus. She recorded the St Matthew Passion with Michel Corboz and the Orchestre de Chambre de Lausanne, Jephtha with Sir Neville Marriner and the Academy of St Martin in the Fields for Decca Records, Handel's Messiah and Dixit Dominus with John Eliot Gardiner and the English Baroque Soloists for Philips Records, Bach's Mass in B minor with Sir Neville Marriner and Pergolesi's Stabat Mater with Claudio Abbado conducting the London Symphony Orchestra for Deutsche Grammophon (featuring Lucia Valentini Terrani as the contralto soloist). Her discography also includes recordings of Mozart's C Minor Mass, Haydn's The Creation, Mahler's Symphonies Nos. 4 and 8, Elgar's The Kingdom and Vaughan-Williams' Sea Symphony.

== Discography ==
Year	Title	Contributing artists	Label
1976	Sacred Music of the Late Baroque	Die Deutschen Barocksolisten, Rudolf Ewerhart	FSM
1977	Vivaldi: Complete Sacred Music, Vols. 1 & 2	Ann Murray, Anne Collins, Anthony Rolfe Johnson, Robert Holl, John Alldis Choir, English Chamber Orchestra, Vittorio Negri	Philips
1978	Vivaldi: Tito Manlio	Giancarlo Luccardi, Rose Wagemann, Julia Hamari, Birgit Finnilä, Domenico Trimarchi, Norma Lerer, Claes H. Ahnsjö, Rundfunkchor Leipzig, Kammerorchester Berlin, Vittorio Negri	Philips
1978	Bach: Mass in B minor	Janet Baker, Robert Tear, Samuel Ramey, Academy and Chorus of St. Martin in the Fields, Sir Neville Marriner	Philips
1978	Vivaldi: Complete Sacred Music, Vol. 4	Ann Murray, Anne Collins, Anthony Rolfe Johnson, Robert Holl, John Alldis Choir, English Chamber Orchestra, Vittorio Negri	Philips
1978	Rossini: Petite Messe Solennelle	Alfred Hodgson, Robert Tear, Malcolm King, London Chamber Choir, László Heltay	Argo
1978	Handel: Dixit Dominus / Zadok the Priest	Felicity Palmer, Charles Brett, John Angelo Messana, Richard Morton, Alastair Thompson, Monteverdi Choir, English Baroque Soloists, Sir John Eliot Gardiner	Erato
1979	Mozart: Great Mass in C minor	Felicity Palmer, Anthony Rolfe Johnson, Gwynne Howell, Academy and Chorus of St. Martin in the Fields, Sir Neville Marriner	Philips
1979	Handel: Jephtha	Alfreda Hodgson, Emma Kirkby, Paul Esswood, Anthony Rolfe Johnson, Christopher Keyte, Academy and Chorus of St. Martin in the Fields, Sir Neville Marriner	Argo
1979	Vivaldi: Complete Sacred Music, Vol. 3	Ann Murray, Birgit Finnilä, John Alldis Choir, English Chamber Orchestra, Vittorio Negri	Philips
1980	Haydn: L'incontro improvviso	Linda Zoghby, Della Jones, Claes H. Ahnsjö, Domenico Trimarchi, Benjamin Luxon, Orchestre de Chambre de Lausanne, Antal Doráti	Philips
1980	Vivaldi: Complete Sacred Music, Vol. 7	Felicity Lott, John Alldis Choir, English Chamber Orchestra, Vittorio Negri	Philips
1980	Pergolesi: Stabat Mater	Alfred Hodgson, Mainzer Kammerorchester, Günter Kehr	Candide
1980	Vivaldi: Complete Sacred Music, Vol. 6	Felicity Lott, Linda Finnie, Anthony Rolfe Johnson, Thomas Thomaschke, John Alldis Choir, English Chamber Orchestra, Vittorio Negri	Philips
1981	Elgar: The Light of Life	Helen Watts, Robin Leggate, John Shirley-Quirk, Royal Liverpool Philharmonic Choir and Orchestra, Sir Charles Groves	EMI
1981	Handel: Saul	Sally Burgess, Paul Esswood, Robert Tear, Thomas Allen, Choir of King's College, Cambridge, English Chamber Orchestra, Philip Ledger	EMI
1981	Mahler: Symphony No. 4	Royal Scottish National Orchestra, Sir Alexander Gibson	Chandos
1981	Mozart: Vespers, K. 321 & 243	Margaret Cable, Wynford Evans, Stephen Roberts, St. John's College Choir, The Wren Orchestra, George Guest	Argo
1981	Mahler: Symphony No. 8	Faye Robinson, Hildegard Heichele, Ortrun Wenkel, Hildegard Laurich, Mallory Walker, Richard Stilwell, Simon Estes, Frankfurter Opern- und Museumsorchester, Michael Gielen	CBS Masterworks
1981	Bach: Cantatas BWV 11 & 34	Alfreda Hodgson, Martyn Hill, Stephen Roberts, King's College Choir, Cambridge, English Chamber Orchestra, Philip Ledger	EMI
1982	Gluck: Orfeo ed Euridice	Agnes Baltsa, Edita Gruberová, Ambrosian Opera Chorus, Philharmonia Orchestra, Riccardo Muti	EMI
1983	Handel: Messiah	Catherine Robbin, Anthony Rolfe Johnson, Robert Hale, Charles Brett, Saul Quirke, Monteverdi Choir, English Baroque Soloists, Sir John Eliot Gardiner	Philips
1983	Mozart: Così fan tutte	Agnes Baltsa, Francisco Araiza, James Morris, Kathleen Battle, José van Dam, Wiener Staatsopernchor, Wiener Philharmoniker, Riccardo Muti	EMI
1983	Bach: St. Matthew Passion	Carolyn Watkinson, Kurt Equiluz, Gerhard Faulstich, Anthony Rolfe Johnson, Philippe Huttenlocher, Ensemble Vocal de Lausanne, Orchestre de Chambre de Lausanne, Michel Corboz	Erato
1984	Mozart: Coronation Mass / Missa Solemnis	Ann Murray, Rogers Covey-Crump, David Wilson-Johnson, Choir of King's College, Cambridge, English Chamber Orchestra, Stephen Cleobury	Decca
1985	Pergolesi: Stabat Mater	Lucia Valentini Terrani, London Symphony Orchestra, Claudio Abbado	Deutsche Grammophon
1985	Berg: Lieder	Kari Lövaas, Dietrich Fischer-Dieskau, Geoffrey Parsons	Deutsche Grammophon
1986	Haydn: Paukenmesse	Carolyn Watkinson, Keith Lewis, Robert Holl, Rundfunkchor Leipzig, Staatskapelle Dresden, Sir Neville Marriner	EMI
1987	Mozart: Davide Penitente	Iris Vermillion, Hans Peter Blochwitz, Südfunk-Chor, Radio-Sinfonieorchester Stuttgart, Sir Neville Marriner	Philips Classics
1987	Monteverdi: Vespro della Beata Vergine	Felicity Palmer, Philip Langridge, Kurt Equiluz, Thomas Hampson, Arnold Schoenberg Chor, Tölzer Knabenchor, Concentus Musicus Wien, Nikolaus Harnoncourt	Teldec
1987	Mahler: Symphony No. 4	L'Orchestre National de Lille, Jean-Claude Casadesus	Forlane
1987	Haydn: The Creation	Lucia Popp, Gwynne Howell, Vinson Cole, Bernd Weikl, Chor und Symphonieorchester des Bayerischen Rundfunks, Rafael Kubelík	Orfeo
1987	Haydn: Nelson-Messe	Carolyn Watkinson, Keith Lewis, Robert Holl, Rundfunkchor Leipzig, Staatskapelle Dresden, Sir Neville Marriner	EMI
1989	Elgar: The Kingdom	Felicity Palmer, Arthur Davies, David Wilson-Johnson, London Symphony Orchestra and Chorus, Richard Hickox	Chandos
1989	Mozart: Die Schuldigkeit des ersten Gebots / Grabmusik	Ann Murray, Inga Nielsen, Hans Peter Blochwitz, Aldo Baldin, Stephen Varcoe, Südfunk-Chor, Radio-Sinfonieorchester Stuttgart, Sir Neville Marriner	Philips Classics
1990	Salieri: Les Danaïdes	Raul Gimenez, Dimitri Kavrakos, Clarry Bartha, Enrico Cossutta, Andrea Martin, Südfunk-Chor, Radio-Sinfonieorchester Stuttgart, Gianluigi Gelmetti	EMI Digital
1990	Mahler: Symphony No. 5	L'Orchestre National de Lille, Jean-Claude Casadesus	Forlane
1991	Bach: St. Matthew Passion	Claes H. Ahnsjö, Hermann Prey, Christoph Dobmeier, Thomas Hamberger, Anton Scharinger, Tölzer Knabenchor, Bach-Collegium München, Enoch zu Guttenberg	Eurodisc (live recording)
