= Op. 60 =

In music, Op. 60 stands for Opus number 60. Compositions that are assigned this number include:

- Beethoven – Symphony No. 4
- Brahms – Piano Quartet No. 3 in C minor
- Carcassi – 25 Studies for guitar
- Chopin – Barcarolle
- Dvořák – Symphony No. 6
- Elgar – The Torch and The River
- Foulds – A World Requiem
- Górecki – Totus Tuus
- Medtner – Piano Concerto No. 3
- Mendelssohn – Die erste Walpurgisnacht
- Saint-Saëns – Suite algérienne
- Schumann – Sechs Fugen über den Namen B-A-C-H
- Scriabin – Prometheus: The Poem of Fire
- Shostakovich – Symphony No. 7
- Strauss – Ariadne auf Naxos
- Strauss – Le bourgeois gentilhomme
- Szymanowski – Symphony No. 4
