= Ulrike Sonntag =

German soprano

- Born: Esslingen am Neckar, West Germany
- Education: Hochschule der Künste Berlin
- Occupations: Operatic soprano; Academic teacher
- Organizations: Staatstheater Stuttgart; Vienna State Opera; Musikhochschule Stuttgart
- Awards: Deutscher Musikwettbewerb

Ulrike Sonntag (born 1959) is a German operatic soprano and academic voice teacher at the Staatliche Hochschule für Musik und Darstellende Kunst Stuttgart. She was previously a member of the Staatstheater Stuttgart, Vienna State Opera, and other ensembles, and has performed in operas and concerts, and taught masterclasses, in several countries. Among her recordings are rarely performed oratorios by Fanny Hensel and Paul Hindemith.

== Life ==
Born in Esslingen am Neckar, she attended the Georgii-Gymnasium at her hometown, concluding with the Abitur. She studied music pedagogy and German in Stuttgart, and then studied voice in Romania and at the Hochschule der Künste Berlin with Irmgard Hartmann-Dressler (1924–2013). She took master classes with Elisabeth Schwarzkopf, Dietrich Fischer-Dieskau and Aribert Reimann. In 1985, Sonntag won the second prize at the Deutscher Musikwettbewerb in Bonn.

Sonntag had already made her stage debut in 1983, while she was studying, at the Hamburgische Staatsoper as Oriane in Johann Christian Bach's Amadis. She became a member of the ensembles in Heidelberg and Mannheim. In 1988, she moved on to the Staatstheater Stuttgart. She was a member of the Vienna State Opera from 1991 to 1994, where she appeared as Susanna in Mozart's Le nozze di Figaro, Donna Elvira in Don Giovanni, Pamina in Die Zauberflöte, Marzelline in Beethoven's Fidelio, Micaela in Bizet's Carmen, Musetta in Puccini's La bohème, and in the Strauss roles Sophie in Der Rosenkavalier and Zdenka in Arabella, among others. She appeared as a guest at opera houses in Berlin (Frau Fluth in Nicolai's Die lustigen Weiber von Windsor), Hamburg, Cologne Opera, Oper Frankfurt, Karlsruhe, Monte Carlo, Cairo, Trieste and Tel Aviv, among others.

Sonntag has held masterclasses in France, Israel, South America and Bulgaria, among others. She has been a professor of voice at the Staatliche Hochschule für Musik und Darstellende Kunst Stuttgart since 2005.

== Recordings ==
Sonntag has recorded sacred music, including Bach's Mass in B minor in 1988 with Helmuth Rilling conducting the Gächinger Kantorei and the Stuttgarter Kammerorchester.

In 1996, she was a soloist in a recording of Paul Hindemith's oratorio Das Unaufhörliche (The Never-Ending), based on texts by Gottfried Benn, with the Rundfunk-Sinfonieorchester Berlin conducted by Lothar Zagrosek. She recorded works by women composers, conducted by Helmut Wolf: Fanny Hensel's Oratorio based on Biblical texts and two psalm settings by Lili Boulanger.

Other recordings include:

- Bach: Herz und Mund und Tat und Leben, BWV 147, Haydn: Nelson Mass, with Alison Browner, Adalbert Kraus, Ernst Gerold Schramm, Collegium Instrumentale Alois Kottmann, Figuralchor des Hessischen Rundfunks, Alois Ickstadt, Melisma 726
- Bach: Johannes-Passion, with Alison Browner, Adalbert Kraus, Ernst Gerold Schramm, Collegium Instrumentale Alois Kottmann, Figuralchor des Hessischen Rundfunks, Alois Ickstadt. Melisma 7058
- Bach: Messe h-Moll, with Alison Browner, Adalbert Kraus, Ernst Gerold Schramm, Collegium Instrumentale Alois Kottmann, Figuralchor Frankfurt, Alois Ickstadt, Melisma 7023-2
