= Ernst Gerold Schramm =

German baritone

- Born: 8 July 1938; Steinheim am Main, Germany
- Died: 8 June 2004 (aged 65); Hanau, Germany
- Education: Musikhochschule Frankfurt
- Occupations: Baritone; Academic voice teacher
- Organizations: Musikhochschule Frankfurt; Hochschule der Künste Berlin

Ernst Gerold Schramm (8 July 1938 – 8 June 2004) was a German baritone in opera and concert, and an academic voice teacher. He was a member of the Staatstheater Hannover and Oper Frankfurt ensembles and performed internationally. He taught at the Musikhochschule Frankfurt and the Universität der Künste Berlin.

== Career ==
Born in Steinheim am Main, Schramm learned piano as a child and sang solo parts in the renowned choir of his uncle. He became a pianist and choral conductor. He studied voice at the Musikhochschule Frankfurt with Ernst Arnold, Martin Gründler and Bruno Vondenhoff, the leader of the opera class. In 1965, he won the International Singing Competition in Geneva. It led to a concert at the Wiener Musikverein, where he performed Ein deutsches Requiem by Brahms, conducted by Wolfgang Sawallisch. He was then engaged to perform and record Bach's St John Passion, St Matthew Passion and Mass in B Minor with Karl Richter. With the Münchener Bach-Chor, he toured South America and Japan in programs of Bach cantatas. He performed concerts with the Marburger Konzertchor, conducted by Siegfried Heinrich, in Liszt's oratorio Die Legende von der Heiligen Elisabeth, and as the vox Christi in Bach's St John Passion on 9 March 1975, both for concerts in Marburg and Frankfurt.

In 1966, Schramm made his stage debut at the Staatstheater Hannover as Marullo in Verdi's Rigoletto. He frequently appeared at the Oper Frankfurt, and during that time also taught voice at the Musikhochschule. As a guest, he appeared at the Deutsche Oper Berlin, Opernhaus Wuppertal, Salzburg Festival, Bregenz Festival and Volksoper in Vienna.

He taught at the Hochschule der Künste Berlin and was also its executive director (Geschäftsführender Direktor). He retired in 2004. He collapsed in rehearsals with his accompanist Alois Ickstadt, and died in Hanau.

== Recordings ==
Schramm took part in many broadcasts on radio and television, including Bach's St John Passion and St Matthew Passion. With Karl Richter, he recorded Bach's Mass in B minor structure with the group, alongside Ursula Buckel, Marga Höffgen and Ernst Haefliger, Also with Richter, he recorded the voice of Christ in the St John Passion in 1970, and the voice of Christ in the St Matthew Passio in 1971, both with Peter Schreier as the Evangelist.

In 1968, he recorded Mozart's Requiem with the Choir and Orchestra of the RAI Turin, conducted by Sergiu Celibidache, alongside Ruth-Margret Pütz, Julia Hamari and Henrick Gritchnik. He recorded Isang Yun's An der Schwelle for baritone, female choir, organ and other instruments in 1975, with women of the RIAS Kammerchor and instrumentalists, conducted by Peter Schwarz. In 1990, he recorded Schubert's Die Winterreise with Ickstadt.

- Handel: Messias, with Sharon Markovich, Hildegard Laurich, Adalbert Kraus, Collegium Instrumentale Alois Kottmann, Figuralchor des Hessischen Rundfunks, Alois Ickstadt, Melisma 6046, Oestrich-Winkel
- Bach: Herz und Mund und Tat und Leben, BWV 147, Haydn: Nelson Mass, with Ulrike Sonntag, Alison Browner, Adalbert Kraus, Collegium Instrumentale Alois Kottmann, Figuralchor des Hessischen Rundfunks, Alois Ickstadt, Melisma 726
- Bach: Johannes-Passion, with Ulrike Sonntag, Alison Browner, Adalbert Kraus, Collegium Instrumentale Alois Kottmann, Figuralchor des Hessischen Rundfunks, Alois Ickstadt. Melisma 7058
- Bach: Messe h-Moll, with Ulrike Sonntag, Alison Browner, Adalbert Kraus, Collegium Instrumentale Alois Kottmann, Figuralchor Frankfurt, Alois Ickstadt, Melisma 7023-2
- Beethoven: Mass in C major, with Gundula Janowitz, Julia Hamari, Horst Laubenthal, Münchener Bach-Chor, Karl Richter, Deutsche Grammophon 2563 056
