= Flinsch =

Flinsch is a surname of German origin. Notable individuals with the surname include:

- Alexander Flinsch (1834–1912), German paper manufacturer
- Erich Flinsch (1905–1990), German pianist
- Ferdinand Traugott Flinsch (1792–1849), German paper manufacturer and older brother of Heinrich
- Heinrich Flinsch (1802–1865), German paper manufacturer and father of Alexander (born 1834)
- Heinrich Flinsch (1839–1921), German paper manufacturer and son of the above
- Margaret Flinsch, maiden name of Joy Buba (1904–1998), American sculptor
- Peter Flinsch (1920–2010), German-Canadian artist
- Walter Flinsch (1903–1943), German rower and WWII pilot
- Wilhelm von Hillern-Flinsch (1884–1986), German expressionist painter
