= Alison Browner =

Irish singer and opera singer

Alison Margaret Browner
- Born: 22 September 1957 (age 68); Dublin, Ireland
- Occupation: mezzo-soprano opera singer
- Spouse: Wilhelm Gries
- Website: alisonbrowner.com

Alison Margaret Browner (born 22 September 1957) is an Irish mezzo-soprano opera singer.

== Life ==
Born in Dublin, Ireland, Browner graduated in Music at Trinity College with a Bachelor of Arts while she also studied singing and violin at the College of Music (now the DIT Conservatory of Music and Drama). Through a scholarship from the German Academic Exchange Service (DAAD) she went to the Hamburg Academy of Music and completed her studies with a recital and concert diploma with Hans Hotter.

Her married name is Alison Gries and she is based in Limburg an der Lahn, Germany.

== Career ==
Her singing career began at the Opera Studio of the Bavarian State Opera in Munich, the Staatstheater Darmstadt working with Hans Hotter.

Browner sang in Richard Strauss' Ariadne auf Naxos and the title role in Der Rosenkavalier and the great Mozart and Rossini parts in 1987 as an ensemble member of the National Theatre Mannheim.

Her international breakthrough came at London's Royal Opera House in the title role of Rossini's La Cenerentola. Numerous appearances in major opera houses such as the Brussels opera house La Monnaie and the Vlaamse Opera in Antwerp and Ghent followed. At the Salzburg Festival she performed under Sir John Eliot Gardiner.

Besides opera Browner shows great interest in the recital and concert repertoire. In recent years she has sung the great oratorios and many recitals throughout Europe and abroad. Browner has celebrated success with a broad repertoire with renowned ensembles and conductors as Philippe Herreweghe, Eric Ericson and his chamber choir, the Concerto Köln and many others.

Browner has sung many concerts with the Limburger Domsingknaben where her husband Wilhelm Gries is vocal coach, assistant choir director and conductor.

Browner's repertoire includes numerous works from the Baroque period (including Bach and Handel), classical (including Haydn, Mozart, Beethoven), Romanticism (including Mendelssohn, Brahms, Schubert, Strauss) and modernity (including Schoenberg, Boulez).

== Discography (selection) ==
- Johann Sebastian Bach: Cantata Herz und Mund und Tat und Leben, BWV 147; Joseph Haydn: Missa in Angustiis, Hob. 11 (Nelson Mass). Performed by: Ulrike Sonntag (soprano), Alison Browner (alto) Adalbert Kraus (tenor), Ernst Gerold Schramm (bass), Collegium Instrumentale Alois Kottmann, Alois Kottmann (violin), Figuralchor Hessischer Rundfunk, Alois Ickstadt (conductor). Melisma 726.
- Johann Sebastian Bach: St John Passion, BWV 245. Performers: Ulrike Sonntag (soprano), Alison Browner (alto), Adalbert Kraus (tenor), Ernst Gerold Schramm (bass), Collegium Instrumentale Alois Kottmann, Alois Kottmann (violin), the Figuralchor Hessian broadcasting, Alois Ickstadt (conductor). Melisma 7058.
- Johann Sebastian Bach: Mass in B minor, BWV 232. Performers: Ulrike Sonntag (soprano), Alison Browner (alto) Adalbert Kraus (tenor), Ernst Gerold Schramm (bass), Collegium Instrumentale Alois Kottmann, Alois Kottmann (violin), Figuralchor Hessischer Rundfunk, conducted by Alois Ickstadt. Melisma 7023-2.
