= The Torch (Elgar) =

Song
- Published: December 23, 1909
- Genre: folk
- Composer: Edward Elgar

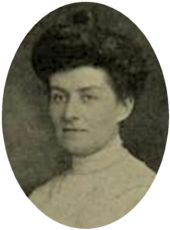
Henry Wood's first wife, Olga

The Torch is a song written by the English composer Edward Elgar in 1909 as his Op.60, No.1.

The manuscript is dated 23 December 1909.

On the title-page, the song is dedicated "To YVONNE," and it is described as a "Folk-Song (Eastern Europe), paraphrased by Pietro d’Alba and Edward Elgar."

It was one of a set of a cycle of four songs that he planned, to his own words. It was shortly after writing the song A Child Asleep for Muriel Foster, a few days before the Christmas of 1909 that Elgar received the news of the death of a friend, the soprano Olga Ouroussoff, the young wife of Henry Wood. The inspiration for the songs was the result of this news. Only the first song of the cycle, The Torch and the last, The River were written.

The song was orchestrated in July 1912 and, with its companion song The River, it was first performed by Muriel Foster at the Hereford Music Festival on 11 September 1912.

== Lyrics ==
THE TORCH

Come, O my love !

Come, fly to me;

All my soul

Cries out for thee :

Haste to thy home,-

I long for thee,
Faint for thee,
Worship thee

Only, - but Come !

Dark is the wood,-

The track's ever lonely and gray;

But joyous the blaze

That welcomes and shows thee the way.

Come, O my love !

Come, fly to me :

All my soul

Cries out for thee !

Haste to thy rest,-

I long for thee,
Sigh for thee,
Faint for thee;

Come to my breast.

Cold is the stream,-

The ford is a danger to thee :

My heart is aflame,

As the beacon that lights thee to me.

Come, O my love !

Come, fly to me !

All my soul

Cries out for thee :

Haste to thy home,-

I long for thee,
Faint for thee,
Worship thee

Only,- but Come !

Pietro d’Alba.

From a Folk-Song (Eastern Europe)

== Recordings ==
- The Songs of Edward Elgar SOMM CD 220 Neil Mackie (tenor) with Malcolm Martineau (piano), at Southlands College, London, April 1999
