= Andreas Großmann =

German organist, church musician and conductor

- Education: Hochschule für Musik Frankfurt; Goethe University
- Occupations: Organist; Conductor; Lecturer
- Organizations: St. Gallus, Flörsheim; Diocese of Limburg; Hochschule für Musik Mainz

Andreas Großmann is a German organist, church musician and conductor. He is the head of the Referat Kirchenmusik in the Diocese of Limburg, responsible for its church music.

== Career ==
Großmann studied church music and music pedagogy at the Hochschule für Musik Frankfurt, as well as Catholic theology at the Goethe University in Frankfurt. His musical teachers included Uwe Gronostay, Edgar Krapp, Wolfgang Schäfer and Heinz Werner Zimmermann.

After his studies, he became church musician at St. Gallus and St. Josef parishes in Flörsheim am Main from 1991 to 2007, where he had already conducted the Flörsheimer Kantorei from 1988. He serves as a member of the advisory board for a concert series, Gallus-Konzerte, organised around the historic Dahm organ of 1709 and focused on Baroque music.

From 1994, Großmann has been a lecturer of Partitur- und Generalbass-Spiel (playing from the score and figured bass) at the Hochschule für Musik Mainz.

In 2007, he was appointed Diözesankirchenmusikdirektor (DKMD), music director of the Diocese of Limburg, leading the Referat Kirchenmusik which coordinates church music across the diocese. In 2008, he also became a member of the "Arbeitsgruppe Orgelbuch", a group preparing organ settings for the hymnal Gotteslob. In 2009, he played the organ of the Alte Oper in an anniversary concert of the International Choir Frankfurt, performing Mendelssohn's Paulus, with soloists including Jonas Kaufmann and Jan-Hendrik Rootering.

The Referat Kirchenmusik under his leadership commissioned a new oratorio, Laudato si', which was performed in 2016 to celebrate the RKM's fiftieth anniversary. In 2017, he organised a synod for the choral conductors of the diocese, with lectures, discussions and choral work with Christoph Siebert, the coach of the Collegium Vocale Gent.
