= Margaret Marshall =

Margaret Marshall may refer to:

- Margaret H. Marshall (born 1944), Chief Justice of the Massachusetts Supreme Judicial Court 1999–2010
- Margaret Anne Marshall (born 1949), Scottish singer, operatic soprano

== See also ==
- Margaret Marshal
