= Hinke =

Hinke is a unisex given name and a surname. Notable people with the name are as follows:

== Given name ==
- Hinke Bergegren (1861–1936), Swedish politician
- Hinke Osinga (born 1969), Dutch mathematician

== Surname ==
- Gustav Hinke (1844–1893), German oboist
