= The River (Elgar) =

Song by Edward Elgar
- Written: December 1909
- Released: July 1926
- Recorded: December 14, 1925
- Studio: Abbey Road Studios
- Label: HMV
- Songwriter: Edward Elgar

The River is a song written by the English composer Edward Elgar in 1909 as his Op.60, No.2.

On the title-page it is described as a "Folk-Song (Eastern Europe), paraphrased by Pietro d’Alba and Edward Elgar".

It was one of a set of a cycle of four songs that he planned, to his own words. It was shortly after writing the song A Child Asleep for Muriel Foster, a few days before the Christmas of 1909 that Elgar received the news of the death of a friend the soprano Olga Ouroussoff, the young wife of Henry Wood. The inspiration for the songs was the result of this news. Only the first song of the cycle, The Torch and the last, The River were written.

It was orchestrated in July 1912 and, with its companion song The Torch, it was first performed by Muriel Foster at the Hereford Music Festival on 11 September 1912.

A footnote to the poem explains the personification of the invoked river. The tempo of the music is an appropriately dramatic Allegro con fuoco.

The song was written by Elgar at his home "Plas Gwyn" outside Hereford, very close to the River Wye and it is likely that the song was inspired by the sight of the river which had flooded the fields that Christmas.

At the end of the manuscript Elgar wrote (Leyrisch-Turasp 1909), which mysterious "place-name" Jerrold Northrop Moore suggests was Elgar's anagram of a German version of Peter Rabbit: Petrus Has[e] Lyric. However Garry Humphreys points out that Elgar's home was not far from the flood-meadows at Tupsley, and Leyrisch-Turasp is another (loose) anagram of Tupsley Parish. Another of Elgar's riddles.

== Lyrics ==
THE RIVER*

River, mother of fighting men, (Rustula !)

Sternest barrier of our land, (Rustula !)

From thy bosom we drew life :

Ancient, honoured, mighty, grand !

Rustula !

Oh ! what worship had been thine, (Rustula !)

Hadst thou held the foe-men, drowned; (Rustula !)

Flood, more precious far than wine,

Victress, saviour, world-renowned !

Rustula !

Rustula !
Like a girl before her lover, (Rustula !)

How thou falterdst, - like a slave; - (Rustula !)

Sank and fainted, low and lower,

When thy mission was to save.

Coward, traitress, shameless !

Rustula !

On thy narrowed, niggard strand, (Rustula !)

Despairing - now the tyrant's hand (Rustula!)

Grips the last remnant of our land,

Wounded and alone I stand,

Tricked, derided, impotent !

Rustula !

Pietro d’Alba.

From a Folk-Song (Eastern Europe)

(Leyrisch-Turasp, 1909)

• NOTE-… “The river was in full flood and, had it remained so another twenty-four hours,

would undoubtedly have overwhelmed the enemy : but it sank far below its normal level

more rapidly than it had risen three days before.”

RECORDINGS

Tudor Davies (Tenor) and Madam Adami (Piano) His Master's Voice - Recorded 14/12/1925 and released 7/1926 - (Recorded Hayes, Middlesex).

- Elgar: The Collector's Edition, CD 29 Robert Tear (tenor), City of Birmingham Symphony Orchestra, Vernon Handley (conductor)
- The Songs of Edward Elgar SOMM CD 220 Neil Mackie (tenor) with Malcolm Martineau (piano), at Southlands College, London, April 1999
