= Muriel Foster =

British opera singer (1877–1937)

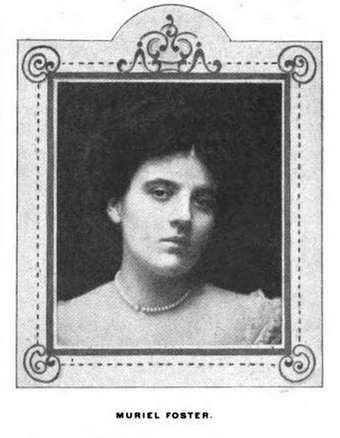
Muriel Foster, from a 1905 publication.

Muriel Foster (22 November 1877 – 23 December 1937) was an English contralto, excelling in oratorio. Grove's Dictionary describes her voice as "one of the most beautiful voices of her time".

Muriel Foster was born in Sunderland in 1877. She was one of twin daughters; her sister was Hilda Foster. Muriel and Hilda studied at the Royal College of Music in London. Muriel's oratorio debut was in Hubert Parry's King Saul in 1896. The Foster sisters performed at the Popular Concerts in 1899 in duets, Hilda retiring in 1900 upon marriage. Muriel Foster performed in Edward Elgar's The Dream of Gerontius under Julius Buths in Düsseldorf in May 1902, of which the Manchester Guardian wrote: "The part of the Angel was given by Miss Muriel Foster with the wonderfully beautiful and genuine voice ..." She had previously sung in Elgar's Sea Pictures. She was also memorable in Brahms' Alto Rhapsody.

She was a personal friend of Elgar and sang in the first performance of his Coronation Ode of 1902; The Apostles (1903); The Kingdom (1906); "The River" (1910) and The Music Makers (1912). Elgar dedicated his song "A Child Asleep" to Muriel Foster's son Anthony Goetz 'for his mother's singing'. In January 1914 she sang at a Royal Philharmonic concert the aria 'Aus der Tiefe des Grames' from Achilleus by Max Bruch, under the baton of Willem Mengelberg, and achieved the distinction of the Gold Medal of the Royal Philharmonic Society.

She also performed in lieder recitals, her regular accompanist being Anthony Bernard.

Muriel Foster performed regularly in London and the provinces, as well as in Germany, the Netherlands, Russia and the USA. She had a command of a number of languages.

In 1906 she married Ludovic Goetz, and later both changed their surname to Foster.

== Quote ==
Charles Villiers Stanford wrote about her

"She has not got the whopping voice of Clara Butt, but she has more poetry and is musical to her fingertips"
