= Rockstedt =

- Municipality
- Coat of arms

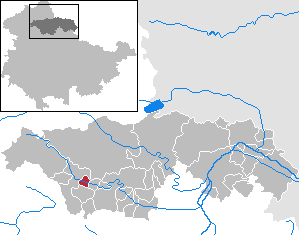
- Location of Rockstedt within Kyffhäuserkreis district
- Interactive map of Rockstedt
- Location within Germany Location within Thuringia
- Coordinates: 51°17′6″N 10°45′43″E
- Country: Germany
- State: Thuringia
- District: Kyffhäuserkreis

Government
  - Mayor (2022–28): Denis Kiel

Area
  - Total: 4.93 km^{2} (1.90 sq mi)
- Elevation: 230 m (750 ft)

Population (2025-12-31)
  - Total: 200
  - Density: 41/km^{2} (110/sq mi)
- Time zone: UTC+01:00 (CET)
  - Summer (DST): UTC+02:00 (CEST)
- Postal codes: 99713
- Dialling codes: 036020
- Vehicle registration: KYF

Rockstedt is a municipality in the district Kyffhäuserkreis, in Thuringia, Germany.

The classical oboist Alfred Gleißberg was born in the city in 1864.
