= Paul Leonard Schäffer =

German composer, conductor and pianist

Paul Leonard Schäffer (born 16 March 1987) is a German composer, conductor and pianist.

== Life ==
Born in Hannover, Schäffer received his first piano lessons at the age of five and a short time later became a member of the Knabenchor Hannover. At the age of 16, he received his first organ lessons from Torsten Meyer. He studied music composition at the Hochschule für Musik und Darstellende Kunst Frankfurt am Main with Gerhard Müller-Hornbach, church music with Martin Lücker (organ) as well as conducting with Wojciech Rajski at the same university. Further studies with Beat Furrer, Mark Andre, as well as song accompaniment and accompaniment lessons with Eugen Wangler and Helmut Deutsch complemented his musical education.

He is a scholarship holder of the Aribert-Reimann-Stiftung, the "Paul-Hindemith und Heinrich-Mann-Stipendiums" of the Landesmusikrat Hessen and since 2010 he has been supported and sponsored by Yehudi Menuhin Live Music Now Frankfurt am Main. In the year 2014 he was finalist of the orchestra composition competition of the Weimarer Frühjahrstage für zeitgenössische Musik.

His works have been performed by the Internationale Ensemble Modern Akademie, of the Jenaer Philharmonie, as well as by the ensemble "l'Autre mOnde". Performances took place at the Staatstheater Wiesbaden, the Alte Oper Frankfurt and in the context of the Rheingau Musik Festival, of the Festival junger Künstler Bayreuth, der Kasseler Musiktage und der Handel-Festspiele Karlsruhe statt.

In February 2012 he made his debut as musical director of The Threepenny Opera with the Staatsphilharmonie Rheinland-Pfalz at Theater im Pfalzbau Ludwigshafen. The production was awarded with the golden bird at the 3rd Papageno-Award. In January 2016. he took over the musical direction of the Figuralchor Frankfurt.

== Awards and scholarships ==
- since 2010: Funding by the Yehudi Menuhin Live Music Now Frankfurt am Main e.V.
- 2011/2012: Scholarship of the Aribert-Reimann-Stiftung.
- 2013: Scholarship holder of the "Paul-Hindemith und Heinrich-Mann-Stipendium" of the Landesmusikrat Hessen, Paul-Hindemith and Heinrich-Mann-Stipendium.
- 2014: Finalist at the orchestra composition competition of the Weimarer Frühjahrstage für zeitgenössische Musik.

== Work ==
=== Lied ===
- "Six Songs" after poems by Georg Trakl (2011), for baritone and piano; premiere: 25 January 2011, UdK Berlin.
- "Five Landscapes" based on poems by Georg Heym (2013), for bass and piano; premiere: 1 December 2014, Deutsche Oper Berlin, commissioned by the Bundeswettbewerb Gesang Berlin.

=== Chamber music ===
- Die Mahnworte des Ipuwer after an ancient Egyptian poem (2009), for two sopranos and percussion; premiere: 31 October 2009, alte Brüderkirche Kassel, commissioned by the Kasseler Musiktage 2009.
- Drei Intermezzi for ensemble on historical instruments (2013); 17 August 2013, Kloster Eberbach in the context of the Rheingau Musik Festival 2013.

=== Musical theatre ===
- Büchners Frauen, music theatre based on texts by Georg Büchner (2011–2013); UA: 24 May 2013, Staatstheater Wiesbaden.
- Eine Kapitulation, a comedy in antique style based on a libretto by Richard Wagner (2010); UA: 24 August 2010, Das Zentrum Bayreuth, commissioned work of the Festival junger Künstler Bayreuth.

=== Orchestral works ===
- et par la porte ouverte la perspective du hasard for orchestra (2013); UA: 27 April 2013, E-Werk Weimar.
