= Alfred Gleißberg =

German classical oboist

Friedrich Julius Alfred Gleißberg (26 November 1864 – 21 August 1963) was a German classical oboist.

== Life ==
Born in Rockstedt, Gleißberg first attended the conservatory in Sondershausen and served as a military musician in the 107 Infantry Regiment in Leipzig. From 1885 to 1888 he studied oboe with Gustav Hinke at the University of Music and Theatre Leipzig.

After that he worked for a short time at the Staatstheater Braunschweig and the Altes Theater in Leipzig. In 1888 he joined the spa orchestra in Interlaken, Switzerland and the Bilseschen chapel in Berlin. From 1893 to 1930 he was member (1st oboist) of the Gewandhausorchester. In 1896 he was one of the founding members of the Gewandhaus-Bläserquintett. From 1927 to 1942 he taught at the Leipzig Conservatory, finally as professor. Axel Schmidt was one of his students.

Gleißberg was a member of the Leipzig masonic lodge Balduin zur Linde.

Gleißberg died in Leipzig at age 98.

== Literature ==
- Hans-Rainer Jung, Claudius Böhm: Das Gewandhaus-Orchester. Seine Mitglieder und seine Geschichte seit 1743. Faber & Faber, Leipzig 2006, ISBN 978-3-936618-86-0, p. 174.
- Der Oboist Alfred Gleißberg ist Legende.
