= Inga Nielsen =

Danish opera soprano (1946–2008)

- Born: 2 June 1946; Holbæk, Denmark
- Died: 10 February 2008 (aged 61); Copenhagen, Denmark
- Occupation: Operatic soprano
- Organizations: Oper Frankfurt
- Spouse: Robert Hale

Inga Nielsen (2 June 1946 – 10 February 2008) was a Danish soprano who had an active international opera career from 1971 to 2006. A child prodigy, Nielsen performed on American radio during the 1950s, beginning at the age of six, and also released some commercial recordings of Danish folk songs and Christmas carols as a child. She began her opera career performing parts in the lyric soprano repertory and then became an admired singer of dramatic soprano roles, beginning in the late 1980s. She was a particularly renowned interpreter of the roles of Konstanze in Mozart's Die Entführung aus dem Serail and the title role in Strauss's Salome. She excelled in portraying some of the more rarely heard and demanding dramatic soprano roles such as the woman in Schoenberg's Erwartung, Ursula in Hindemith's Mathis der Maler and Jenny in Weill's Rise and Fall of the City of Mahagonny.

== Early life and education ==
Nielsen was born in Holbæk, Denmark, to a Danish father and an Austrian mother. Her father was a professor of languages and a skilled amateur pianist. At the age of three Nielsen moved with her family to the state of Iowa in the United States. At a very early age, Nielsen displayed a prodigious musical talent and began honing her skills performing Danish songs in her father's classes at the age of four. Nielsen stated in a 2002 interview that, "My father toured as an educationalist. He taught about Denmark. I'd come on in a Danish folk dress and sing Danish songs in Danish classes." By age six, she was singing on the radio and a number of childhood recordings from as early as 1952 exist with Nielsen singing folk songs accompanied by her father. Her first full album recording was made at the age of nine with Columbia Records (recently reissued on Chandos) and consisted of Danish folksongs and Christmas carols.

In 1953, at the age of seven, Nielsen met the Austrian soprano Hilde Güden while she was on tour in Iowa. Nielsen's father asked Güden for advice on "what to do with this child" and, after hearing Nielsen sing, advised her to pursue a professional singing career. A number of years later, after the Nielsens had moved back to Europe, Inga enrolled at the Vienna Academy of Music. During this time Güden arranged for Nielsen to study with her own teacher in Stuttgart. However, Nielsen was not satisfied with her studies in Austria and Germany and she ultimately completed her studies at the Franz Liszt Academy of Music in Budapest under Jenö Sipos under the recommendation of Hungarian contralto Julia Hamari.

== Career ==
After finishing her studies, Nielsen made her professional opera debut as Laura in Millöcker's Der Bettelstudent at the Musiktheater im Revier in Gelsenkirchen in 1971. She spent the next four years of her career performing roles from the soubrette repertoire in opera houses throughout Germany and Switzerland. In 1975 Nielsen joined the roster of principal sopranos at the Oper Frankfurt where she sang regularly through 1980.

In 1980 Nielsen decided to leave Frankfurt and become a freelance artist. She made her United States debut that year at the New York City Opera (NYCO) as Adele in Die Fledermaus by Johan Strauss. She returned to that company the following year to sing Micaela in Bizet's Carmen. Nielsen's experiences singing at the NYCO convinced her that she had the potential to take on larger roles. The poor acoustics and the large size of the New York State Theater led Nielsen to try pushing her voice beyond her normal practice. In doing so she found that she was able to fill the house without losing pitch or beauty of timbre. She spent the next decade working on expanding the size of her voice and gradually began working in heavier roles into her performance repertoire.

Nielsen became a major presence at the world's best opera houses during the 1980s and 1990s. She was a regular guest performer at the Vienna State Opera, Milan's La Scala; the Royal Opera House in London, and also the opera houses of Munich, Hamburg, Berlin, Paris, Zurich, Barcelona as well as New York, Buenos Aires, Florence and Bologna. She sang at music festivals such as the Salzburg Festival, Aix-en-Provence Festival, Edinburgh Festival, and Mostly Mozart Festival, among others. In 1983 she portrayed the role of Minette in the world premiere of Henze's The English Cat at the Schlosstheater Schwetzingen; a role she reprised at the Santa Fe Opera in 1985. Summer 1985 Nielsen recorded her first solo album with the Helsingborg Symphony Orchestra and Sir Antonio Pappano for Big Ben Phonogram. Her first major critical success on the international stage was as Mozart's Konstanze at the Salzburg Festival (1987, 1989) and at the Royal Opera House (1988), both led by Sir Georg Solti.

Throughout the 1990s, Nielsen continued to assume new roles that required more from her musically and dramatically. The role of Strauss's Salome, which she first performed at the Zurich Opera in 1993, became one of her signature roles. She recorded it for Chandos in 1999. Opera News said that this recording "preserves her singular combination of youthful, silvery timbre and visceral dramatic power". Other important successes during the 1990s and afterwards included Ursula in Peter Sellars's Covent Garden staging of Hindemith's Mathis der Maler (1995); Agathe in Weber's Der Freischütz at Zurich (1999); Jenny in Weill's Aufstieg und Fall der Stadt Mahagonny in Hamburg (2000); the Woman in Schoenberg's Erwartung in Cincinnati and London (2001–02); and the Empress in Die Frau ohne Schatten in Los Angeles (2004).

In her home country Nielsen was awarded the Tagea Brandt Rejselegat in 1984 and appointed Knight of Dannebrog by Queen Margrethe II of Denmark in 1992. She was particularly admired in Denmark for two outdoor concerts in Copenhagen with Plácido Domingo in 1993 and sang at the opening ceremony for Copenhagen's Storebaelt Bridge in 1998. She taught as a guest professor of voice at the Royal Academy of Music in Aarhus and gave masterclasses at numerous conservatories and institutions internationally. Her farewell concert celebrating her 35 years in the profession took place in 2006 at the Tivoli Gardens but she was scheduled to return to the opera stage in early 2008 in Elektra by Richard Strauss in Venice and Die Frau ohne Schatten at the Deutsche Oper am Rhein at the time of her death.

== Personal life ==
Nielsen was married for many years to leading American bass-baritone Robert Hale. The couple divorced in 2005. Nielsen died at the Gentofte Hospital in Copenhagen of a stroke, following a battle with cancer on 10 February 2008, aged 61.
