= Robert Hale (bass-baritone) =

American opera singer (1933–2023)

- Hale in the 1970s
- Born: August 22, 1933; Kerrville, Texas, U.S.
- Died: August 23, 2023 (aged 90); California, U.S.
- Occupation: Operatic bass-baritone
- Organizations: New York City Opera; Deutsche Oper Berlin

Robert Hale (August 22, 1933 – August 23, 2023) was an American operatic bass-baritone. He was first a leading baritone at the New York City Opera for a decade, where he performed, alongside Beverly Sills, mostly in Mozart operas and in the revival of belcanto opera such as Donizetti's Lucia di Lammermoor.

Hale then shifted to heavier roles, performing the title role of Wagner's Der fliegende Holländer first in 1978 at the Opernhaus Wuppertal, Germany. After his success there, he became in demand to perform the role at leading opera houses in Europe and the United States. He went further and tackled the role of Wotan in Wagner's Ring cycle, which he first performed in Wiesbaden in 1984, then at the Deutsche Oper Berlin in 1986. It became his signature role, performed and recorded worldwide, and he regarded the Berlin company as his artistic home for almost two decades.

== Life and career ==
Born in Kerrville, Texas, on August 22, 1933, Robert Hale spent his childhood in Louisiana. His family then moved to Oklahoma City, where he attended high school and college. He graduated from Bethany-Peniel College (now Southern Nazarene University) in 1955 with a Bachelor of Music degree. He then completed his master's degree at the University of Oklahoma. During his studies there, he won the National Association of Teachers of Singing award in the Singer of the Year category. He completed further studies at Boston University and the New England Conservatory of Music. He won the Metropolitan Opera National Council Auditions. His voice teachers were Gladys Miller, Chloe Owen and Léopold Simoneau, and also Boris Goldovsky in New York.

=== Early career in the United States ===
Hale began his career as a recitalist appearing in concert halls across the United States. He made his operatic debut in 1965 in the title role of Mozart's Le nozze di Figaro at the Denver Opera. He appeared at the New York City Opera from 1967, first as Colline in Puccini's La bohème. He remained with the company as a leading baritone for 10 years, where he was often seen in productions starring Beverly Sills, performing for example as Raimondo in Donizetti's Lucia di Lammermoor which was broadcast nationwide. Other roles in the revival of the then-neglected belcanto repertoire were Enrico in Donizetti's Anna Bolena, and Bellini's Giorgio in I puritani, and Oroveso in Norma. He also appeared there as Mozart's Don Giovanni, as both Figaro and the Count in Le nozzze di figaro, also as Escamillo in Bizet's Carmen, and the Father in Chabrier's Louise.

As a guest, he performed the role of Claudius in Hamlet by Ambroise Thomas at the San Diego Opera in 1978, and the four villains in Offenbach's Les contes d'Hoffmann at the Teatro Colón in Buenos Aires in 1980.

=== International career ===
Hale shifted towards heavier bass-baritone repertoire and appeared in the title role of Wagner's Der fliegende Holländer first at the Opernhaus Wuppertal in Germany in 1978. After the success there, he became in demand to sing it at other houses, such as the Bavarian State Opera, the Hamburg State Opera and the Stuttgart State Opera the same year, and also at the Opernhaus Zürich, Deutsche Oper am Rhein and Oper Frankfurt, among others. Hale appeared at the Metropolitan Opera in New York City, again first as the Holländer, alongside Janis Martin as Senta and conducted by James Levine. It was his 100th performance in the role, as reviewer John Rockwell from the New York Times mentioned, who compared the evening to the premiere with a different cast. He wrote:

Mr. Hale, a former New York City Opera stalwart, made a fine impression. He lacks the beauty of tone and security of production of Mr. Morris, who preceded him in this production. But he sang and acted with more dramatic fire, and even looked the part of this spectral wanderer better than the sleeker Mr. Morris. The voice itself is a solid one, not particularly large or biting or authoritative. But Mr. Hale knows how to declaim a Wagnerian phrase, and his big moments - "Die Frist ist um", "Wie aus der Ferne" and his final self-revelation - made a far greater impact than they had in Mr. Morris's bland account.

Hale performed the role of Wotan in Wagner's Der Ring des Nibelungen (which is the Wanderer in its part Siegfried), first at Hessisches Staatstheater Wiesbaden, directed by Nicolas Joel, who had been an assistant to Patrice Chéreau for the Jahrhundertring, the centenary production of the Ring at the Bayreuth Festival in 1976. Hale appreciated the director's work as "strong, clear, concise, related directly to the text". He then performed the role at Deutsche Oper Berlin, in a 1986 production directed by Götz Friedrich. He came to regard the company as his artistic home, where he learned "not only to sing his great operatic roles, but also to shape them in terms of words and acting". He performed Wotan in 30 performances at the house until 2005, and was on stage more than 170 times. The Ring production toured to Japan, as the first time the cycle was performed there completely. It also toured to the Kennedy Center in Washington, D.C., in 1989. A reviewer noted then:

Here was an artist whose voice, good face, noble bearing and telling gestures expressed the promptings of a deep imagination, an artist who commanded not just the notes of his part but the spirit, from tragic grandeur to ironic detachment, from flooding tenderness to grim rage, all breaking forth with the immediacy of real life. It was almost too much to hope for. Even his silences were eloquent. Before he made a sound, he was making music.

Other roles in Berlin included Pizarro in Beethoven's Fidelio, Amonasro in Verdi's Aida, Scarpia in Puccini's Tosca, the Holländer, the four villains in Les contes d'Hoffmann, and Méphistophélès in Gounod's Faust, as a "whimsical antithesis" to Wotan. giving him a chance to show his "comic talent with electric guitar and devil costume".

Hale appeared as Wotan and Holländer in many major opera houses of the world, receiving the Russian Golden Mask award in 2005 for his performance as the Holländer at the Bolshoi Theatre. He performed the role of Jochanaan in Salome by Richard Strauss when he first sang at the Royal Opera House in London, in 1988, where he worked with Georg Solti. Hale performed in the Ring and as Escamillo at the San Francisco Opera. He portrayed Wotan in Die Walküre at the Vienna State Opera in 1992, alongside Plácido Domingo as Siegmund. He also appeared as Jago in Verdi's Otello. Hale sang the title role of Bartok's opera Bluebeard's Castle, in a concert performance at Carnegie Hall in May 1999, with Christoph von Dohnányi conducting the Cleveland Philharmonic. In 2002, he appeared as the Holländer at the San Diego Opera. He performed at other leading opera houses including La Scala in Milan, the Liceu in Barcelona, Théâtre du Châtelet in Paris, the Royal Danish Opera, the Finnish National Opera, and the Sydney Opera.

He performed at many European festivals. At the Salzburg Festival, he portrayed Pizarro in Fidelio and sang the bass solo in Beethoven's Ninth Symphony in 1990, and returned for Barak in Die Frau ohne Schatten in 1992. He took part in the Bregenz Festival Ravenna, Lausanne, Bordeaux and Savonlinna. In the United States, he appeared at the Tanglewood Music Festival, the Ravinia Festival, Cincinnati May Festival, the Wolftrap, and at the Hollywood Bowl.

=== Personal life ===
Hale was half of the "Hale & Wilder" concert duo, performing folk and gospel music with tenor Dean Wilder in over 4000 concerts.

He had three sons with his first wife Sherry, whom he married in the 1950s. After this marriage ended in divorce, he was married to the soprano Inga Nielsen from 1978. They recorded love songs together, and operas such as Salome and Tosca, of which Nielsen said "I have many ways of killing my husband". They were divorced in 2005. Hale then married another soprano in 2006, Marina Poplavskaya: they met when performing Wagner's Der fliegende Holländer together. They divorced several months later, but remained friends. Hale then married for the fourth and final time in 2009, to soprano Julie Davies.

In the summer of 2009 Hale started performing in recitals and concerts (especially in churches) with his wife Julie Davies, under the name "Hale & Davies: Celebration of Song."

In the U.S., Hale was a national patron of Delta Omicron, an international professional music fraternity.

Robert Hale died in California on August 23, 2023, one day after his 90th birthday.

== Recordings ==
Hale is featured as Wotan on the Decca recordings of Das Rheingold and Die Walküre with Christoph von Dohnányi conducting the Cleveland Orchestra, as well as Der fliegende Holländer with Dohnányi conducting the Vienna Philharmonic, all three issued on compact discs. He recorded Wotan also on EMI's video recording of the complete Ring cycle from the Bavarian State Opera in Munich with Wolfgang Sawallisch conducting.

Hale recorded Handel's Messiah with Sir John Eliot Gardiner on Decca, and both Verdi's Requiem and Schumann's Das Paradies und die Peri for Deutsche Grammophon with Giuseppe Sinopoli. Hale recorded the role of Jochanaan in the Chandos 1998 recording of Salome by Richard Strauss.

=== Audio ===
Hale's recordings include:

- Handel: Messiah Philips
- Wagner: Das Rheingold Decca
- Wagner: Die Walküre Decca
- Wagner: Der fliegende Holländer Decca
- Wagner: Der Ring des Nibelungen EMI
- Strauss: Salome Chandos
- Schumann: Das Paradies und die Peri Deutsche Grammophon
- Song of Love (love songs from Broadway musicals, with Inga Nielsen) EMI

=== Video ===
Hale's videos include:

- Strauss: Die Frau ohne Schatten (1992), directed by Götz Friedrich, with Vienna Philharmonic, conducted by Georg Solti, DECCA
- Wagner: Der fliegende Holländer (Vienna Philharmonic Orchestra), EMI
- Wagner: Der Ring des Nibelungen (Bavarian State Opera in Munich, Sawallisch), EMI
- Bizet: Carmen (Live from Lincoln Center)
- Donizetti: Lucia di Lammermoor (Live from Lincoln Center)
- Schreker: Die Gezeichneten (Salzburg Festival, ASIN B01M749234)
