= The Apostles (Elgar) =

1903 oratorio

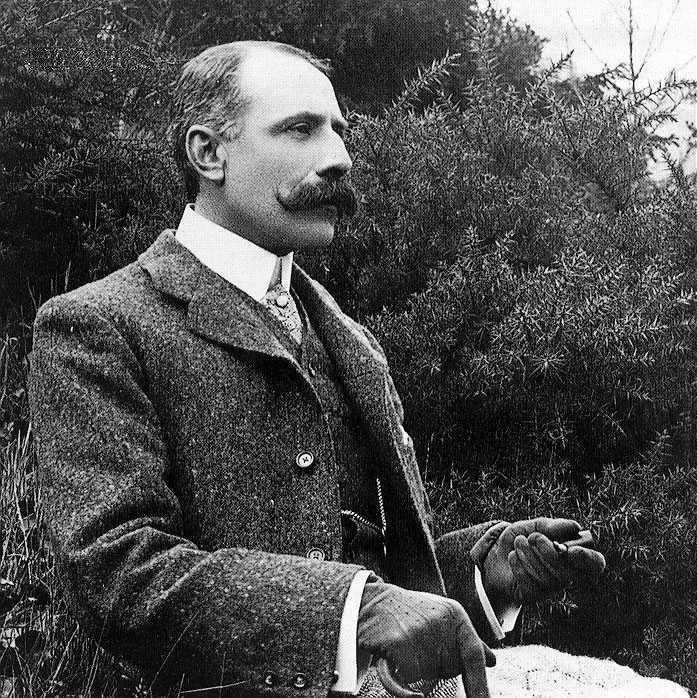
Edward Elgar, c. 1900

The Apostles, Op. 49, is an oratorio for soloists, chorus and orchestra composed by Edward Elgar. It was first performed on 14 October 1903 at the Birmingham Music Festival.

== Overview ==
After his international success with the Enigma Variations (1899) and The Dream of Gerontius (1900), Elgar was commissioned by the Birmingham Triennial Music Festival, which had also produced Gerontius, to write a new choral work. This encouraged Elgar to start composing a large-scale work on a subject he had been contemplating, according to the composer, since boyhood when he had even started selecting the words. The Apostles, like its successor The Kingdom, depicts the disciples of Jesus and their reactions to the extraordinary events they witness.

Despite arranging the commission in December 1901, Elgar paid little attention to The Apostles until July 1902, when he had finished composing and rehearsing his Coronation Ode, Op. 44. Elgar's planning of the libretto included a long immersion in theological writings, as well as Wagner's sketch for "Jesus von Nazareth", and Henry W. Longfellow's poem "The Divine Tragedy". He assembled his libretto from verses of scripture, as had been the pattern for many of the most influential oratorios, including Handel's Messiah (1741) and Mendelssohn's Elijah (1846). After many delays, Elgar finally started formal composition of the music in mid-December 1902. Composition of the work in vocal-score format was complete by the end of June 1903, with scoring complete on 17 August.

The Apostles is a narrative work, dealing with the calling of the Apostles and their experiences of Jesus' preaching, miracles, crucifixion, resurrection and ascension. The Kingdom would carry the story onward. Elgar was more interested in human motivations than philosophical underpinnings, and two of the most prominent characters in the work are the two sinners Mary Magdalene and Judas Iscariot.

Elgar's conception outgrew the confines of a single work: The Kingdom was first conceived as the last part of The Apostles, but later Elgar considered them as the first two parts of a trilogy. In any case, the projected third part, The Last Judgement, never got further than a few sketches which Elgar produced sporadically until 1920.

The German translation and the German premiere were both the work of the conductor Julius Buths.

== Roles ==
The Apostles is written for a large orchestra, of typical late Romantic proportions, with the addition of a shofar (usually substituted by a more conventional instrument, such as a flugelhorn), which announces the dawn. There is a double chorus with semichorus, and six solo singers representing:

Role	Voice Type
Blessed Virgin, Angel Gabriel	soprano
Mary Magdalene	contralto
St John	tenor
St Peter	bass
Jesus	bass
Judas	bass

== Synopsis ==
The work is in two parts and seven sections, each played without a break. Words were selected by Elgar from the Bible and Apocrypha.

1. (Part 1) "The Calling of the Apostles". The music begins just before dawn; the sun rises, and one by one the Apostles are chosen.
2. "By the Wayside". This depicts Jesus' teaching, and particularly evokes the Beatitudes.
3. "By the Sea of Galilee". Crossing the sea is incidental; Mary Magdalene is the focus here. After a stormy night scene, her conversion is portrayed, and the scene moves to Caesarea Philippi and Capernaum. The scene is followed by a choral epilogue, "Turn ye to the stronghold," added late in the composition of the piece.
4. (Part 2) "The Betrayal". Although it follows the Passion narrative, the section is chiefly concerned with the character and motivation of Judas. He is shown as trying to maneuver Jesus so that he is forced to show his divine power and establish his kingdom. The events of the trial and condemnation happen "off-stage", with occasional contributions by the chorus (in the roles of singers in the temple and the mob). In the end Judas gives way to despair.
5. "Golgotha". The scene of the crucifixion is, in Elgar's words, "a mere sketch". Jesus' dying words "Eli, eli, lama sabachthani" are declaimed by the orchestra alone; after which the chorus respond pianissimo, "Truly this was the son of God".
6. "At the Sepulchre". The story of the Resurrection is briefly told by the narrator and a chorus of angels, in a blissful, spring-like interlude.
7. "The Ascension". The miracle is almost incidental; the point is that the Apostles, though here joining in praise with the angels, are about to establish the church on earth. This idea informs the final climax of the work, scored for the full forces of soloists, chorus and orchestra.

== Instrumentation ==
Strings

- Violins I, II
- Violas
- Celli
- Double basses

Woodwind

- 3 Flutes (one doubling piccolo)
- 3 Oboes (one doubling cor anglais) (In movement I, rehearsal figures 14–24, first oboist and cor anglais briefly play offstage)
- 2 Clarinets
- 1 Bass Clarinet
- 2 Bassoons
- 1 Contrabassoon

Brass

- 4 Horns
- 1 Shofar (Offstage)
- 3 Trumpets
- 3 Trombones
- 1 Tuba

Percussion

- 3 Timpani (32", 29", 26")
- Bass Drum
- Crash cymbals
- Suspended cymbals
- Crotales (Pitch C4)
- Large tam tam
- Gong (Pitch Eb2)
- Tambourine
- Snare drum
- Triangle
- Glockenspiel

Other

- 2 Harps (2nd ad lib)
- Organ

Voices

- Soprano solo
- Alto solo
- Tenor solo
- 3 Bass soloists
- SATB choir

Elgar specified that the Semi-Chorus, at the fourth bar after rehearsal number 201, should consist of 24 voices (6 to each part) and should sing from the front row of the chorus. The Semi-Chorus could also be a separate body of voices (Boys' voices to produce the most ideal effect) elevated above the chorus. If it is not possible to have a Semi-Chorus without weakening the Chorus, the Semi-Choir should be sung by the front row of the Chorus.
