= Erich Flinsch =

Erich Flinsch (14 July 1905 – 28 December 1990) was a German pianist and university lecturer. He was a grand-disciple of Franz Liszt (1811-1886) and student and assistant of the pianist, composer and musicologist Emil von Sauer (1862–1942) in Vienna.

== Life and career ==
Born in Frankfurt am Main, Flinsch was the successor of Walther Davisson (1885–1973) one of the three board members of the Frankfurt University of Music and Performing Arts and of the Hoch Conservatory in Frankfurt am Main, together with Gustav Lenzewski (1896–1988) and Helmut Walcha (1907–1991).

In this period, in July 1956, he was together with the physician and town councillor Max Flesch-Thebesius (1889–1983) founder of the "Robert-Schumann-Gesellschaft Frankfurt am Main" in der Villa Bonn.

Flinsch died in Schneidhain at age 85.

== Work ==
- Erich Flinsch: Ludwig Schuncke, Schumann's Freund und Mitbegründer der Neue Zeitschrift für Musik. In Neue Zeitschrift für Musik 121 (1960), p. 199–203.

== Students ==
- Herbie Hess
- Alois Ickstadt
- Robert Leonardy
- Michael Ponti
