= St. Gallus, Flörsheim =

Catholic church in Flörsheim, Germany

St. Gallus
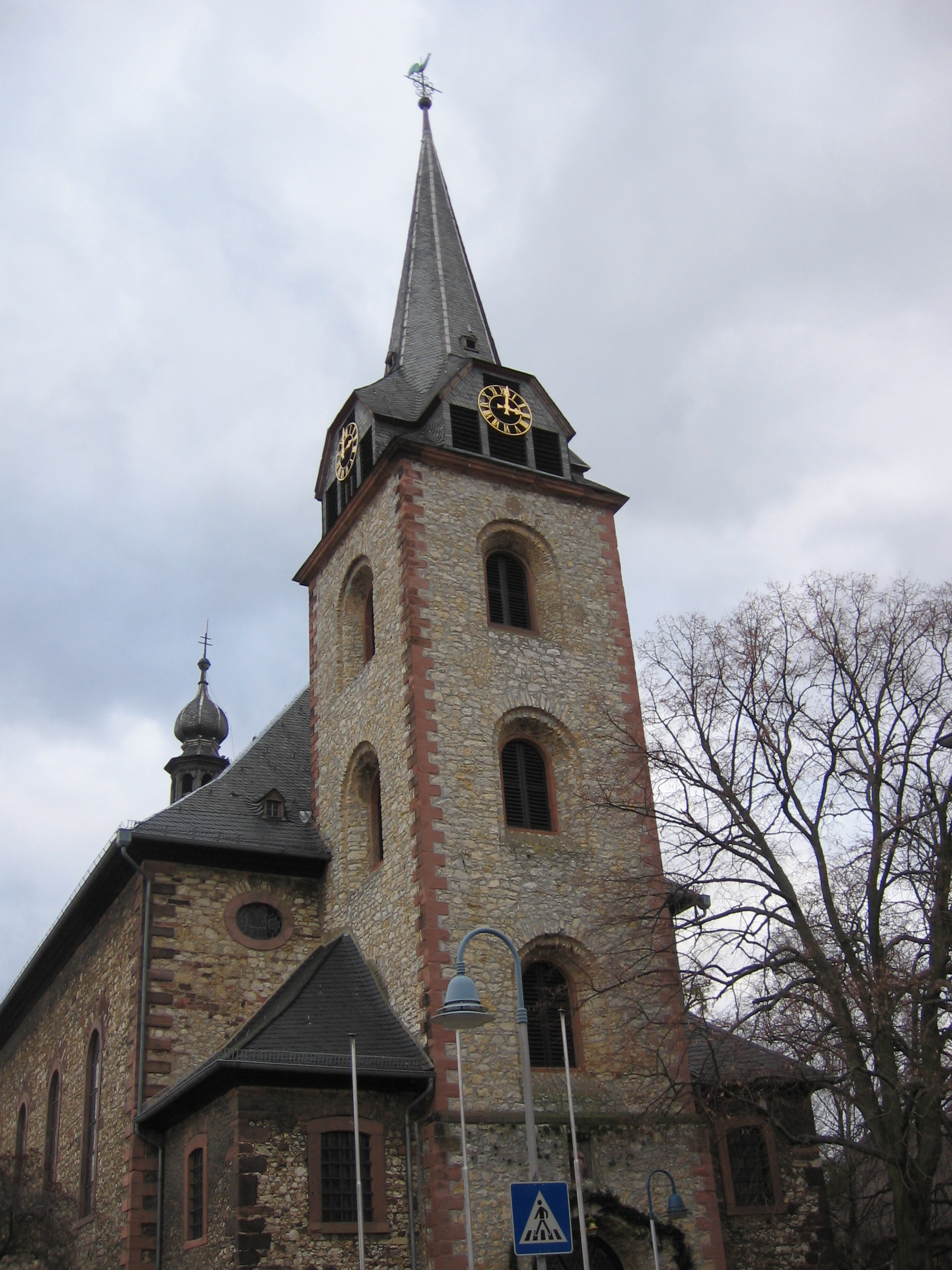
- Exterior

Religion
- Affiliation: Catholic
- Province: Diocese of Limburg
- Ecclesiastical or organizational status: Parish church

Location
- Location: Flörsheim, Hesse, Germany
- Interactive map of St. Gallus
- Coordinates: 51°39′03″N 07°32′21″E

Architecture
- Style: Rococo
- Completed: 1777

Website
- kath-kirche-floersheim.de

St. Gallus is a Catholic church and parish in Flörsheim, Hesse, Germany, dedicated to Saint Gall. It was completed in 1766 in Rococo style. Featuring a historic organ from 1709, it is a concert venue of the Gallus-Konzerte series of mostly sacred music concerts.

== History ==
The present church was completed in 1766 in Rococo style. It is the extension of a building from 1666, with the west tower built by Johann Kersten in 1706.

== Architecture ==
While the exterior is simple, the interior is richly decorated. It is a large hall church with a narrow choir, which looks semicircular inside and three-sided from outside. The exterior in quarry stone masonry was intended for plastering. The tower and church feature round-arched windows. The south portal shows a chronostichon from 1767.

The interior is decorated with a mirrored ceiling and furnishings in uniform rococo style. Apostle medallions and stucco frames of the side windows were added around 1913. The church features an elevated chancel, a high altar, inclined side altars, pulpit and baptismal font. The altar area is separated from the nave by a curved balustrade. The high retable altar has paintings in rococo design by G. Chr. Schütz the Elder. The ceiling paintings were created in 1768 by Joh. Ignaz Heideloff. Other original furnishings include a Pietà and confessionals.

The church is a listed monument.

== Organ ==
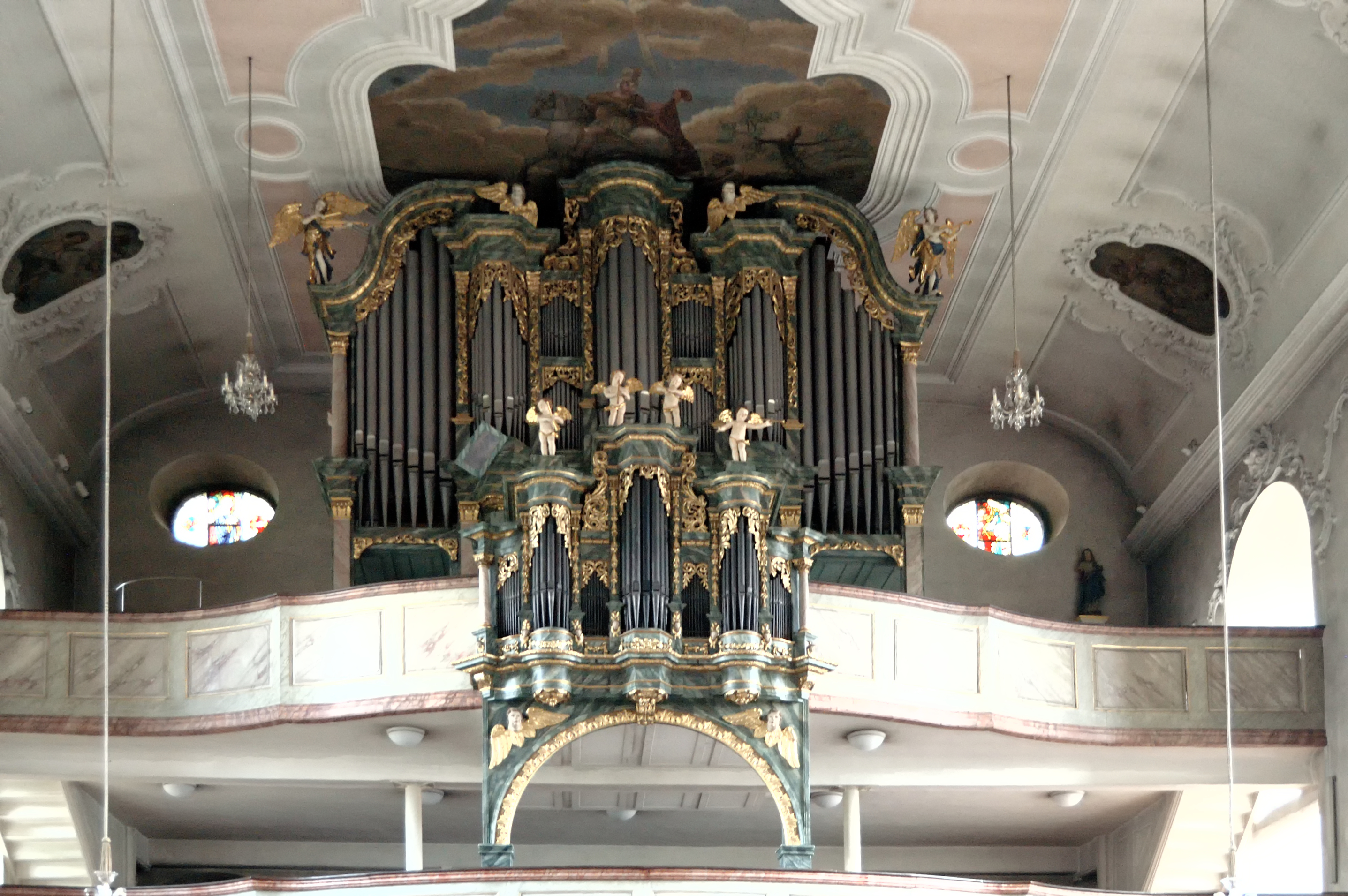
Dahm organ

The organ was built in the 18th century by Johann Jakob Dahm (1660–1727), an organ builder from Mainz. He created it originally in 1709 for the Karmeliterkloster abbey in Frankfurt, as an instrument of 22 stops on two manuals and pedal. It was expanded in 1748 by Johann Christian Köhler who added a third manual of 7 stops. It was sold to Flörsheim in 1809 when the monasteries were dissolved. An 1818 notice from the government of Hesse-Nassau describes the instrument as the best and most beautiful in the whole duchy ("die schönste und beste Orgel im ganzen Herzogtum").

The organ was restored and expanded from 1959 to 1961 by Paul Ott from Göttingen. The Prospect and some stops are still original, and thus the largest instruments containing parts by Dahm.

== Gallus-Konzerte ==
The Gallus-Konzerte concert series was founded in 1979, with a first concert on 9 November 1980, using the hall with good acoustics and the historic organ for concerts of regional importance, with a focus on sacred music. The concerts have been organised in collaboration with the broadcaster Hessischer Rundfunk. Some of them were recorded, such as:

- Gallus-Konzerte in der Barockkirche zu Flörsheim am Main, works by Wolfgang Amadeus Mozart, Mendelssohn, Rheinberger and others, Collegium Instrumentale Alois Kottmann, Figuralchor des Hessischen Rundfunks, conducted by Alois Ickstadt. Cappella Wiesbaden 1989, Opus 27035.
- Gallus-Konzerte Flörsheim am Main, works by Mozart, Buxtehude, Mendelssohn, Bach, Haydn, and others. Collegium Instrumentale Alois Kottmann, Figuralchor des Hessischen Rundfunks, conducted by Ickstadt. Cappella Wiesbaden 1990, Opus 27042.
