= Gustav Hinke =

German oboist

Gustav Adolf Hinke (24 August 1844 – 5 August 1893) was a German classical oboist.

== Life ==
Born in Dresden, Hinke was born in 1844 as the son of a musician. He attended the Dresden Kreuzschule from 1857 and studied oboe with Rudolf Hiebendahl at the Dresden Conservatory from 1859 to 1864. He was also taught piano by Julius Adolf Rühlmann and many others.

In 1865 he became an aspirant in the Staatskapelle Dresden. In 1867 he then became a member (1st oboist) in the Gewandhausorchester in Leipzig. In addition he taught from 1873 to 1878 at the Leipzig Conservatory. Among his students was Alfred Gleißberg.

Hinke was editor of an oboe school by C. F. Peters Musikverlag in Leipzig.

Hinke died in Leipzig at age 48.

== Works ==
- Praktische Elementarschule für Oboe. C. F. Peters Musikverlag.
- Alfred Sous: Neue Oboenschule. Unter Einbeziehung der Elementarschule für Oboe von Gustav Adolf Hinke. Edition Peters.

== Literature ==
- Hans-Rainer Jung. Claudius Böhm: Das Gewandhaus-Orchester. Seine Mitglieder und seine Geschichte seit 1743. Faber & Faber, Leipzig 2006, ISBN 978-3-936618-86-0, p. 128.
