= A Child Asleep =

Edward Elgar in 1917

"A Child Asleep" is a song, with lyrics from a poem written by Elizabeth Barrett Browning. It was set to music by the English composer Edward Elgar in December 1909 and published in 1910 by Novello. It was first published by Browning in 1840.

It is dedicated to Anthony Goetz, the son of Ludovic Goetz and Muriel Foster, a favourite singer and personal friend of Elgar.

== Lyrics ==
How he sleepeth!

Vision unto vision calleth,
While the young child dreameth on.
Fair, O dreamer, thee befalleth
With the glory thou hast won!
Darker wert thou in the garden, yestermorn, by summer sun.

We should see the spirits [rising]
Round thee,—were the clouds away.
'Tis the child-heart draws them, singing
In the silent-seeming clay.
Singing!—stars that seem the mutest, go in music music all the way.

Softly, softly! make no noises!
Now he lieth [still] and dumb.
Now he hears the angels' voices
Folding silence in the room.
Now he muses deep the meaning of the Heaven-words as they come.

He is harmless—[we] are sinful.
[We] are troubled—he, at ease.
From his slumber, virtue winful
Floweth outward with increase.
Dare not bless him! but be blessèd by his peace—and go in peace.

— Stanza I, line 1a; stanzas IV, V, IX, and XII
