= Zigeunerlieder (Brahms) =

- Song cycle by Johannes Brahms
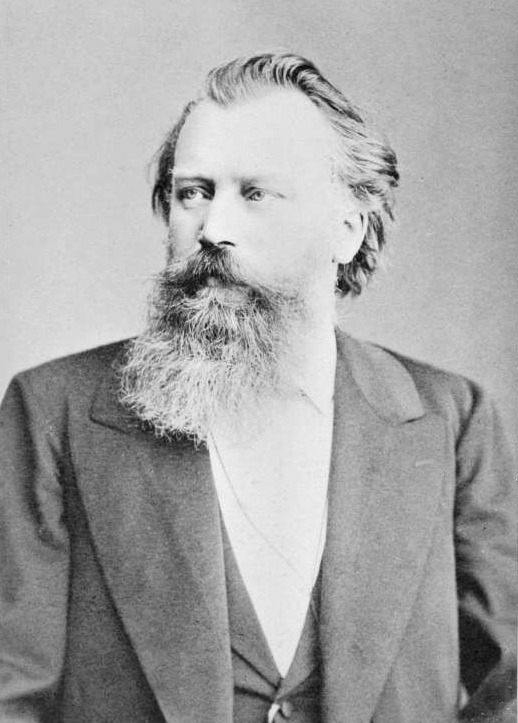
- The composer in 1887
- English: Gypsy songs
- Opus: 103, 112
- Text: Hungarian folk songs
- Language: German
- Composed: 1888, 1891
- Performed: 31 October 1899: Berlin
- Movements: 11 + 4
- Scoring: four vocal parts and piano

The Zigeunerlieder (Gypsy songs), Op. 103 and Op. 112 Nos. 3–6, are a song cycle for four singers (or choir) and piano by Johannes Brahms (Op. 103 Nos. 1–7 and 11 exist also in an arrangement for solo voice and piano made by Brahms himself). The texts are Hungarian folk songs in German adaptation by Hugo Conrat (originally Hugo Cohn, 1845–1906), a member of Brahms’ circle in Vienna. The first translation of the texts was by the Hungarian nurse of the Conrat family.

== History ==
The first eleven pieces of the cycle, which formed some well-connected story, were put to music by Brahms either in his Thun summer of 1887 or in winter 1887/88 straight-away during a stay in Budapest. Further four songs followed in 1891 and were published together with the song quartets Sehnsucht and Nächtens (text by Franz Theodor Kugler), which had no connection with the Zigeunerlieder, but nonetheless were put together to form Brahms's Op. 112.

In Brahms's total work the Zigeunerlieder can be seen – on the one hand – as a vocal counterpart of the Hungarian Dances and – on the other hand – as exotic counterpart to the more-referenced Liebesliederwalzer Opp. 52 and 65.

The first public performance of the songs Op. 103 was on 31 October 1888 in Berlin, with great success, although the presentation of the opus in a concert hall presented some bad feelings to the composer, since Brahms had conceived his opus genuinely for soloist quartets, and had thought of performances at home. Nonetheless, the songs are also suited for (small) choirs, particularly in connection with the voluminous sound of modern pianos. As a consequence, performances by choirs in concert are now the rule. CD-representations are, instead, frequently performed by soloists.

== List of songs ==
Zigeunerlieder, Op. 103

1. He, Zigeuner, greife in die Saiten
2. Hochgetürmte Rimaflut
3. Wißt ihr, wann mein Kindchen
4. Lieber Gott, du weißt
5. Brauner Bursche führt zum Tanze
6. Röslein dreie in der Reihe
7. Kommt dir manchmal in den Sinn
8. Horch, der Wind klagt in den Zweigen
9. Weit und breit schaut niemand mich an
10. Mond verhüllt sein Angesicht
11. Rote Abendwolken ziehn

Vier Zigeunerlieder, Op. 112

1. Himmel strahlt so helle
2. Rote Rosenknospen künden
3. Brennessel steht an Weges Rand
4. Liebe Schwalbe, kleine Schwalbe

== Literature ==
- Hans Gebhard, ed.: Harenberg Chormusikführer. Harenberg, Dortmund 1999, ISBN 3-611-00817-6.
