= Alfred Sous =

German oboist

Alfred Sous (24 November 1925 – 6 April 2011) was a German classical oboist, University lecturer and writer.

== Life ==
Born in Rheydt, at the age of 14 Sous began his music education at the Heeresmusikschule Bückeburg. In 1942 he was drafted. After his training as a soldier he was sent to the Eastern Front and in 1943 to Soviet war captivity.

After seven years as a prisoner of war, where he was "intendant" of a camp theatre group, he finished his music studies with Winschermann. His first engagement was in Darmstadt. Afterwards, in 1952, he went to Frankfurt as a solo oboist for the hr-Sinfonieorchester of the Hessischer Rundfunk. He was also a member of the Cappella Coloniensis and the Bayreuth Bayreuth Festival Orchestra.

Sous was oboe professor at the Frankfurt University of Music and Performing Arts.

He has published works on the history of the Bayreuth Festival Orchestra and the hr-Sinfonieorchester. He became known with his crime novel Tosca and the satire Broderich komponiert schwarze Löcher(Broderich composes black holes).

After his retirement, Sous lived in southern Spain for 12 years before returning to Germany and spending the last years of his life in Weilheim and Munich where he died at age 85.

== Work ==
- Neue Oboenschule. Unter Einbeziehung der Elementarschule für Oboe von Gustav Hinke.Edition Peters, ISMN 979-0014058661
- Das Bayreuther Festspielorchester: Geschichte und Gegenwart. Ansporn-Verlag, 1988, ISBN 978-3924706319
- Tosca. Buch&Media Verlag, 2006 ISBN 978-3865202215
