= Mallory Walker =

American opera singer (1935–2014)

Mallory Elton Walker (May 22, 1935 — December 7, 2014) was an American operatic tenor and music educator who had an active international singing career in operas and concerts from the late 1950s until his death in 2014. His career was at its height during the 1960s and 1970s when he was busy with many important opera companies in the United States and had engagements in European opera houses. His career hit a slump in the early 1980s due to vocal difficulties, and afterwards his major engagements became less frequent. He taught on the voice faculty at the Boston Conservatory of Music and out of a private voice studio in Los Angeles.

== Life and career ==
Born in New Orleans, Walker earned a Bachelor of Music degree from Occidental College in Los Angeles which he attended on a full vocal scholarship. He began his singing career as a member of the United States Army Chorus in 1957. He made his professional opera debut portraying Tom Rakewell in The Rake's Progress at the Washington National Opera in 1959. He then became a soloist with the Robert Shaw Chorale, with whom he toured the United States performing the tenor solos in Johann Sebastian Bach's Mass in B minor in 1960. He recorded the work under Robert Shaw's baton for the RCA Victor label.

In 1960 Walker entered the Metropolitan Opera Studio, the Metropolitan Opera's school for young opera singers, where he was a pupil of George Schick and Cornelius Reid. That same year he sang Ferrando in Mozarts's Così fan tutte at Lincoln Center for a performance attended by New York City public school children under the auspices of the Student Program of Lincoln Center and the Metropolitan Opera Guild. In 1962 he made his debut at the San Francisco Opera (SFO) as Belmonte in Die Entführung aus dem Serail, and returned there the following year as Tamino in The Magic Flute.

In 1963-1964 Walker was a resident artist at the Oldenburgisches Staatstheater. He then became a resident artist at the Cologne Opera from 1964-1966. Other contracts soon followed with such companies as the Cincinnati Opera, the Houston Grand Opera, the Lyric Opera of Kansas City, the Miami Opera, and the New Orleans Opera among others. In 1971 he created the role of Jonathan Gilourin in the world premiere of Dominick Argento's Colonel Jonathan the Saint at the Denver Lyric Opera. In 1974 he was handpicked by Sir Georg Solti to sing the role of the Evangelist in Bach's St Matthew Passion with the Chicago Symphony Orchestra (CSO). He returned twice more for performances with Solti and the CSO for performances of the Shepherd in Stravinsky's Oedipus Rex (1976) and Beethoven's Missa solemnis (1977); the latter of which was recorded for London Records.

In 1978 Walker made his debut at the Metropolitan Opera in 1978, as Captain Vere in Billy Budd. He returned to the SFO in 1979 for performances in Death in Venice, La fanciulla del West, and Gianni Schicchi. In the early 1980s his career hit a slump as he began to experience vocal difficulties. He took work anywhere he could get, including singing in opera choruses and as a church soloist. He attracted attention again at the Mostly Mozart Festival in 1984 when he replaced an ailing Jerry Hadley in the title role of Mozart's Idomeneo. Walker had been a member of the opera chorus and stepped in with less than a day's notice to very positive reviews in The New York Times. In 1985 he portrayed Kabuki in the world premiere of Minoru Miki's Joruri at the Opera Theatre of Saint Louis. After this his performances with major companies were infrequent, although he remained active as a concert soloist, chorus singer and church singer until his death in Anaheim, California, in 2014 at the age of 79.

Some of the other roles Walker performed on stage during his career included Alfredo in La traviata, Alwa in Lulu, Don Ottavio in Don Giovanni, Fenton in Verdi's Falstaff, Nadir in Les pêcheurs de perles, Rodolfo in La bohème, and the title role in Albert Herring.
