= Hildegard Laurich =

German contralto (1941–2009)

- Born: 15 January 1941; Halle
- Died: 11 February 2009 (aged 68)
- Education: Hochschule für Musik Detmold
- Occupation: Classical contralto

Hildegard Laurich (15 January 1941 – 11 February 2009), was a German classical contralto singer.

== Professional career ==
Born in Halle, Laurich studied at the Hochschule für Musik Detmold, in Berlin with Hermann Weissenborn, and in private study with Professor Frederick Husler in Cureglia.

She sang mostly in concert, particularly in works of Johann Sebastian Bach. In 1974 she sang the alto part in Bach's St Matthew Passion in the Konstantinbasilika of Trier with Gertraud Stoklassa, Kurt Huber, Siegmund Nimsgern, William Reimer, the Trierer Bachchor, the Rundfunk-Sinfonie-Orchester Saarbrücken, conducted by Ekkehard Schneck.

She appeared at the Handel Festival Göttingen in 1969 and 1971, at the Toledo Festival of 1970 in Spain, and at the German Bach Festival. On the opera stage she appeared as a guest in Classical and Baroque operas, among others at the Teatro Colón Buenos Aires, at the opera houses of Rio de Janeiro and Mexico City, and in German theatres.

== Recordings ==
Laurich recorded Bach cantatas regularly with Helmuth Rilling and his Gächinger Kantorei in their complete recording, including in 1973 the cantata for Ratswahl (inauguration of the town council in Leipzig) Gott, man lobet dich in der Stille, BWV 120, together with Helen Donath, Adalbert Kraus and Wolfgang Schöne. She recorded Bruckner's Requiem, cantatas of Georg Frideric Handel, works of Heinrich Schütz, and Romeo und Julia of Heinrich Sutermeister. In 1980 she recorded the Messe des morts of François-Joseph Gossec, with Herbert Schernus conducting the choir of the WDR and the Capella Coloniensis. In 1981 she was one of the soloists for a recording of Mahler's Symphony No. 8, with Michael Gielen conducting the Frankfurter Opern- und Museumsorchester.
