= Julia Hamari =

Hungarian mezzo-soprano and alto operatic singer

- Born: 21 November 1942 (age 83); Budapest
- Education: Franz Liszt Academy of Music
- Occupations: Classical mezzo-soprano; Academic teacher
- Organizations: Musikhochschule Stuttgart; Internationale Bachakademie Stuttgart; Oregon Bach Festival

Julia Hamari (born 21 November 1942) is a Hungarian mezzo-soprano and alto singer in opera and concert, appearing internationally. She is an academic voice teacher in Stuttgart.

== Professional career ==
Julia Hamari was born in Budapest where she received her vocal training with Fatime Martins and Jenö Sipos. She studied at the Franz Liszt Academy of Music and received her diploma for both singer and singing teacher. In 1964 she won the Erkel International Singing Competition in Budapest. She then continued her studies at the Staatliche Hochschule für Musik Stuttgart until 1966.

In 1966, she made her debut as a soloist in Bach's St Matthew Passion with Karl Richter in Vienna, together with Teresa Stich-Randall, Peter Schreier, Hermann Prey and Ernst Gerold Schramm.

=== Opera ===
Her opera debut was the role of Mercedes in Bizet's Carmen at the Salzburg Festival of 1967 (with Grace Bumbry, Jon Vickers and Mirella Freni, Herbert von Karajan conducting). Shortly thereafter she appeared in Carmen's title role at the Staatsoper Stuttgart conducted by Carlos Kleiber. Her early career soon included major roles such as Malcolm in a 1970 Turin revival of Rossini's La Donna del Lago (joining Franco Bonisolli as Uberto and Montserrat Caballé as Elena). In 1975, she sang the role of Magdalene in Georg Solti's first recording of Wagner's Die Meistersinger von Nürnberg (with the Vienna Philharmonic, Norman Bailey as Sachs and René Kollo as Stolzing). In 1979, she appeared as Celia in Haydn's La fedeltà premiata at the Glyndebourne Festival, in 1980 as Orfeo in Gluck's Orfeo ed Euridice at the Maggio Musicale Fiorentino, in 1984 as Dorabella in Mozart's Così fan tutte at the Dallas Opera, and in 1986 as the title role Angelina in Rossini's La Cenerentola. In 1982 she made her Metropolitan Opera debut as Rosina in Rossini's Il barbiere di Siviglia. At the Cologne Opera she performed as Sesto in Mozart's La clemenza di Tito, and at the Royal Opera House she was Cherubino in Mozart's Le nozze di Figaro. She recorded the role of Elzire in the premiere recording of Don Sanche on Hungaroton.

=== Concert ===
Hamari recorded with Richter and his Münchener Bach-Chor several Bach cantatas, including Allein zu dir, Herr Jesu Christ, BWV 33. She recorded even more Bach cantatas with Helmuth Rilling and his Gächinger Kantorei in their complete recording, including the solo cantata for alto Vergnügte Ruh, beliebte Seelenlust, BWV 170, written for the sixth Sunday after Trinity, which notable singers such as Maureen Forrester and Andreas Scholl had recorded before. With Helmut Winschermann and the Deutsche Bachsolisten she also recorded Bach cantatas including Herz und Mund und Tat und Leben, BWV 147. In 1968 she recorded the St Matthew Passion with Wolfgang Gönnenwein, Theo Altmeyer as the Evangelist, Franz Crass, Teresa Żylis-Gara, Nicolai Gedda, Hermann Prey and Hans Sotin. In 1974, she recorded Bach's St John Passion with Karl Münchinger, the Stuttgarter Hymnus-Chorknaben, Dieter Ellenbeck, Walter Berry, Elly Ameling, Werner Hollweg and Hermann Prey. In 1977, she sang soprano II and alto in Rilling's first recording of Bach's Mass in B minor. She performed the alto solo in Mozart's Requiem in a recording of 1970 with Edith Mathis, Wieslaw Ochman, Karl Ridderbusch, the Vienna Philharmonic and the Vienna State Opera Concert Choir, conducted by Karl Böhm. For Hungaroton she recorded the Pergolesi's Stabat Mater conducted by Lamberto Gardelli in 1981.

She participated in the 1975 premiere and 1993 recording of Gottfried von Einem's cantata An die Nachgeborenen, written in 1973 as a commission of the UN, both with Dietrich Fischer-Dieskau and the Wiener Symphoniker conducted by Carlo Maria Giulini.

=== Teaching ===
In 1989, Hamari was appointed professor of singing at the Hochschule für Musik Stuttgart. She has conducted master classes and has been teaching at the Internationale Bachakademie Stuttgart and the Oregon Bach Festival since 1982. Her students have included the countertenor Patrick Van Goethem.

== Recordings ==
- Eugene Onegin, in the role of Olga, with Georg Solti conducting the orchestra of the Royal Opera House, Covent Garden, with Bernd Weikl, Teresa Kubiak, Stuart Burrows, and Nicolai Ghiaurov, also used as the score to Petr Weigl's filming of the opera.
