= Nelson Mass =

1798 Mass by Joseph Haydn

Missa in angustiis
- Nelson Mass
- Missa solemnis by Joseph Haydn
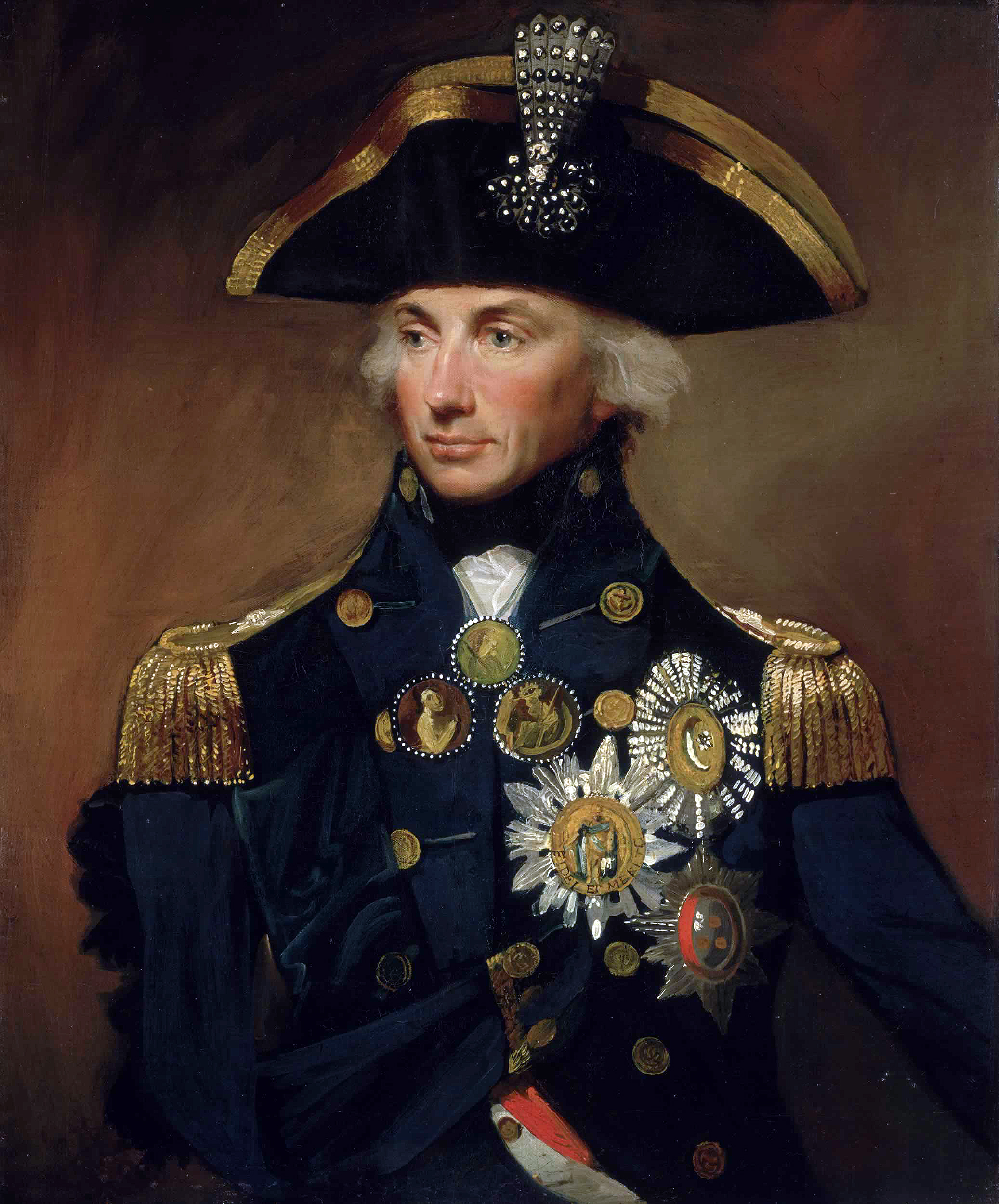
- Lord Nelson, for whom the mass is nicknamed
- Catalogue: Hob. XXII/11
- Language: Latin
- Performed: 23 September 1798: Eisenstadt
- Movements: 6
- Vocal: SATB choir and soloists
- Instrumental: orchestra

Kyrie

Gloria: Gloria in excelsis Deo

Gloria: Qui tollis peccata mundi

Gloria: Quoniam tu solus sanctus

Credo: Credo in unum Deum

Credo: Et incarnatus est

Credo: Et resurrexit

Sanctus

Benedictus: Benedictus qui venit

Benedictus: Hosanna in excelsis

Agnus Dei: Agnus Dei, qui tollis peccata mundi

The Missa in angustiis (Mass for troubled times), commonly known as the Nelson Mass (Hob. XXII/11), is a mass setting by the Austrian composer Joseph Haydn. It is one of the six masses written near the end of his career that are seen as a culmination of Haydn's composition of liturgical music.

== Background ==
Haydn's chief biographer, H. C. Robbins Landon, has written that this mass "is arguably Haydn's greatest single composition". Written in 1798, it is one of the six late masses by Haydn for the Esterhazy family composed after taking a short hiatus, during which elaborate church music was inhibited by the Josephinian reforms of the 1780s. The late sacred works of Haydn are regarded as masterworks, influenced by the experience of his London symphonies. They highlight the soloists and chorus while allowing the orchestra to play a prominent role. Owing to the political and financial instability of this period in European history, Haydn's patron Nikolaus II dismissed the Feldharmonie, or wind band octet, shortly before Haydn wrote the Missa in angustiis for the Princess's name day. Haydn, therefore, was left with a "dark" orchestra composed of strings, trumpets, timpani, and organ. Later editors and arrangers added what they perceived to be missing woodwind parts, but the original scoring has again become the accepted choice for modern performances.

Though Haydn's reputation was at its peak in 1798 when he wrote this mass, his world was in turmoil. French forces under Napoleon had won four major battles against the Austrian army in less than a year. The previous year, in early 1797, French armies had crossed the Alps and threatened Vienna itself. In May 1798, Napoleon led an expeditionary force which invaded Egypt with the stated aims of securing French commercial interests in the Middle East, cutting off British trade routes to the East Indies and establishing a scientific presence in Egypt.

The summer of 1798 was therefore a terrifying time for Austria, and when Haydn finished this mass, his own title, in the catalogue of his works, was Missa in angustiis (Mass for troubled times). What Haydn did not know when he wrote the mass, but what he and his audience heard (perhaps on September 15, the day of the very first performance), was that on 1 August, the French Navy had been dealt a crushing defeat at the Battle of the Nile by a British fleet under Rear-Admiral Horatio Nelson. Because of this coincidence, the mass gradually acquired the nickname Nelson Mass. The title became indelible when, in 1800, Nelson himself visited the Palais Esterházy accompanied by his mistress Emma, Lady Hamilton, and may have heard the mass conducted by Haydn whom he would meet shortly afterwards.

Haydn's original title may also have come from illness and exhaustion at that time, which followed his supervision of the first performances of The Creation, completed a few months earlier. More simply, it may have sprung from the challenge of composing without the desired instrumentation. The solo parts for two of the vocal quartet are virtuosic: the bass line was perhaps written for the accomplished Christian Specht, and the soprano line, even more demanding, could have been written for Barbara Pilhofer or Therese Gassmann. The piece was premiered 23 September 1798 at the town parish church (now cathedral), a last minute venue change from the Bergkirche in Eisenstadt.

== Movements ==
The text, slightly altered, is taken from the Latin Mass of the Catholic church. It consists of the following six movements. Typical performances last around 40 minutes. The choir sings in all movements.

1. Kyrie, Allegro moderato, D minor, 3/4 (soprano solo)
2. Gloria, Allegro, D major, common time (soli soprano, alto, tenor, bass [SATB])
  Qui tollis, Adagio, B-flat major, 3/4 (soli soprano, baritone)
  Quoniam tu solus sanctus, Allegro, D major, common time (soli SATB)
3. Credo, Allegro con spirito, D major, alla breve
  Et incarnatus est, Largo, G major, 3/4 (soli SATB)
  Et resurrexit, Vivace, D major, common time (soprano solo)
4. Sanctus, Adagio, D major, common time
  Pleni sunt coeli, Allegro, D major, 3/4
5. Benedictus, Allegretto, D minor, 2/4 (soli SATB)
  Osanna in excelsis, Allegro, D major, 3/4
6. Agnus Dei, Adagio, G major, 3/4 (soli SATB)
  Dona nobis pacem, Vivace, D major, common time (soli SATB)

== Selected discography ==
- 1962: King's College Choir and a reduced London Symphony Orchestra with Sylvia Stahlman (soprano), Helen Watts (contralto), Wilfred Brown (tenor), Tom Krause (baritone), Simon Preston (organ), conducted by Sir David Willcocks; recording re-released in 2000 by London/Decca Legends CD 458623
- 1986: The English Concert Choir and the English Concert conducted by Trevor Pinnock, recording released in 1990 by Archiv Produktion (Deutsche Grammophon) CD 423097
