= Adalbert Kraus =

German tenor in opera and concert (born 1937)

- Born: 27 April 1937 (age 87); Aschaffenburg
- Education: Hochschule für Musik Würzburg
- Occupation: Classical tenor
- Organizations: Staatsoper Hannover; Hochschule für Musik und Theater München

Adalbert Kraus (born 27 April 1937) is a German tenor in opera and concert, known for singing the works of Johann Sebastian Bach.

== Career ==
Kraus was born in Aschaffenburg. He first graduated in German studies, theology, and philosophy and in 1967, began to study voice at the Hochschule für Musik Würzburg with Henriette Klink-Schneider.

He was a lyric tenor at the Staatsoper Hannover from 1970 to 1974. His roles included Andres in Berg's Wozzeck, Toni in Henze's Elegy for Young Lovers, and Lord Bucklaw in Donizetti's Lucia di Lammermoor. He sang the role of Peter Iwanow in a 1976 recording of Albert Lortzing's Zar und Zimmermann with Lucia Popp as Marie, Karl Ridderbusch as van Bett, and Hermann Prey as Peter I.

He frequently sang the tenor part in the complete recording of Bach cantatas and oratorios of Helmuth Rilling and the Gächinger Kantorei, also the Evangelist in his passions. In Bach's Easter Oratorio, he performed the tenor part of Simon Peter, singing with the bass (portraying John the Apostle) the first duet Kommt, eilet und laufet (Come, hasten and run).

He also recorded rarely performed works such as Argenore of Markgräfin W. v. Bayreuth or the Lukas-Passion of Georg Philipp Telemann.

Adalbert Kraus was a teacher at the Hochschule für Musik und Theater München, the Würzburg College of Music, and a guest lecturer at both the Tokyo College of Music and the Internationale Bachakademie Stuttgart.

He wrote books on religious and philosophical topics such as Die leuchtende Spur – Orientierung im 21. Jahrhundert and Ein Gott – Eine Weltreligion.

== Recordings ==
- Lortzing: Zar und Zimmermann, Bavarian Radio Symphony Orchestra and Choir, Heinz Wallberg, Acanta 1976
- Bach: Matthäus-Passion, Siegmund Nimsgern, Arleen Augér, Ann Murray, Julia Hamari, Aldo Baldin, Philippe Huttenlocher, Gächinger Kantorei, Bach-Collegium Stuttgart, conductor Helmuth Rilling, Columbia Masterworks Records, 1978
- Bach: Easter Cantatas including Easter Oratorio, Arleen Augér, Julia Hamari, Philippe Huttenlocher, Gächinger Kantorei, Bach-Collegium Stuttgart, Rilling
- Markgräfin W. v. Bayreuth: Argenore, Angelika Luz, Lucas-Consort
- Georg Philipp Telemann: Lukas-Passion 1744, Uta Spreckelsen, Theo Altmeyer, Gerhard Faulstich, Gerd Beusker, Frankfurter Madrigal-Ensemble, Hessisches Kammerorchester, conductor Siegfried Heinrich
- Haydn: Die Schöpfung, Helen Donath, Kurt Widmer, Süddeutscher Madrigalchor, Festivalorchester Ludwigsburg, conductor Wolfgang Gönnenwein
