= List of operas by Joseph Haydn =

Portrait of Joseph Haydn by Thomas Hardy, in 1791

Joseph Haydn is not primarily remembered as a composer of opera, yet the genre occupied a great deal of his time. During the 1770s and 1780s, Haydn ran an opera troupe on behalf of his employer, Prince Nikolaus Esterházy, which put on up to 150 performances per year. A number of the operas were Haydn's own work. Haydn's operas are only occasionally performed today.

The list is arranged chronologically and divided by career stage.

== Composed as a freelance musician ==
- 1753: Der krumme Teufel, Hob. 29/1a, Singspiel (libretto by Joseph Felix von Kurz), composed during Haydn's time as a freelance musician. Now lost.

== Composed during Haydn's service for the Esterházy family ==
Date	Title	Hob.	Genre	Subdivisions	Libretto	Notes
1763 revised 1773/1774	Acide e Galatea	28/1	festa teatrale	1 act	Giovanni Ambrogio Migliavacca	
1766	La canterina (The Songstress)	28/2	intermezzo in musica	2 acts		
1768	Lo speziale (The Apothecary)	28/3	dramma giocoso	3 acts	Carlo Goldoni, revised by Carl Friberth?	
1770	Le pescatrici (The Fishwives)	28/4	dramma giocoso	3 acts	Carlo Goldoni, revised by Carl Friberth?	
1773	L'infedeltà delusa (Deceit Outwitted)	28/5	burletta per musica	2 acts	Marco Coltellini, revised by Carl Friberth?	
1773	Der Hexenschabbas (The Witches' Shabbas)	29a/2	Singspiel for marionettes			Music lost
1775	L'incontro improvviso (The Unexpected Encounter)	28/6	dramma giocoso	3 acts	Carl Friberth, after L H Dancourt's La rencontre imprévue	
1775	Die Feuersbrunst (The Conflagration)	29b/A	Singspiel	2 acts		Uncertain. Music lost
1776	Didone Abbandonata (Dido)	29a/3	Singspiel for marionettes		Philipp Georg Bader	Music lost
1776	Philemon und Baucis	29b/2	Singspiel	1 act	after a play by Gottlieb Konrad Pfeffel	
1777	Il mondo della luna (The World on the Moon)	28/7	dramma giocoso	3 acts	Carlo Goldoni	
1777	Genovevens vierter Theil (Genovevens part four)	29a/5	Singspiel for marionettes		Joseph Karl von Pauersbach	Music lost
1778/1779	Le Glorieux oder Der Grosssprecher (Le Glorieux or The Great Speaker)	29b/B	Singspiel			Uncertain. Music lost
1779 revised 1785	La vera costanza (True Constancy)	28/8	dramma giocoso	3 acts	Francesco Puttini	
1779	L'isola disabitata (The Deserted Island)	28/9	azione teatrale	2 parts	Metastasio	
1779	Die bestrafte Rachbegierde (The punished desire for revenge)	29b/3	Singspiel	3 acts	Philipp Georg Bader	Music lost
c. 1779	Das abgebrannte Haus (The Burned House)	29a/4	Singspiel for marionettes			Music lost
1781	La fedeltà premiata (Fidelity Rewarded)	28/10	dramma giocoso	3 acts	after Giambattista's Lorenzi's L'infedeltà fedele	
1782	Orlando paladino (The Paladin Orlando)	28/11	dramma eroicomico	3 acts	Nunziato Porta, based on Carlo Francesco Badini's Le pazzie d'Orlando, after Ludovico Ariosto's Orlando furioso	
1784	Armida	28/12	dramma eroico	3 acts	after Torquato Tasso's Gerusalemme liberata	
1786/1788	Grün und Rosenfarb (Green and rose color)	29b/E	Singspiel	1 act		Uncertain. Music lost

== Composed for the first London journey ==
- 1791: L'anima del filosofo, ossia Orfeo ed Euridice, Hob. 28/13, dramma per musica in 4 acts (libretto by Carlo Francesco Badini). Haydn's own version of the Orpheus tale, the plot of a great many operas. Haydn's only post-Esterházy opera, composed for his 1791 trip to London but never performed there, due to intrigues.

== Recordings ==
During the 1970s, after the release of his complete Haydn symphony cycle, Hungarian-American conductor Antal Doráti recorded eight of Haydn's operas for Philips Records, with the Orchestre de Chambre de Lausanne. The selected works were Armida, La fedeltà premiata, L'incontro improvviso, L'infedeltà delusa, L'isola disabitata, Il mondo della luna, Orlando paladino and La vera costanza. These were initially released on LP format, then subsequently on CD in 1993. Many of Doráti's Haydn operas are still reference recordings, and have had successful reviews from Gramophone and The Penguin Guide to Recorded Classical Music.
