= Luigi Alva =

Peruvian opera tenor (1927–2025)

- Luigi Alva, c. 1949
- Born: Luis Ernesto Alva y Talledo; 10 April 1927; Paita, Peru
- Died: 15 May 2025 (aged 98); Mariano Comense, Italy
- Education: Conservatorio Nacional de Música, Lima
- Occupation: Operatic tenor

Luis Ernesto Alva y Talledo (10 April 1927 – 15 May 2025), known professionally as Luigi Alva, was a Peruvian operatic tenor who worked internationally at the major opera houses and festivals. A Mozart and Rossini specialist, Alva achieved fame with roles such as Don Ottavio in Mozart's Don Giovanni, Count Almaviva in Rossini's The Barber of Seville, and Fenton in Verdi's Falstaff, but he also appeared in world premieres. He retired from the stage in 1989.

== Life and career ==
Alva was born in Paita, Peru, and served for a while in the Peruvian Navy before concentrating on a singing career. He studied at the Conservatorio Nacional de Música in Lima with Rosa Mercedes Ayarza de Morales and sang in Federico Moreno Torroba's zarzuela Luisa Fernanda in Lima in 1949. He performed at the Teatro Municipal de Lima first as Beppe in Leoncavallo's Pagliacci in 1951.

Alva in 1955

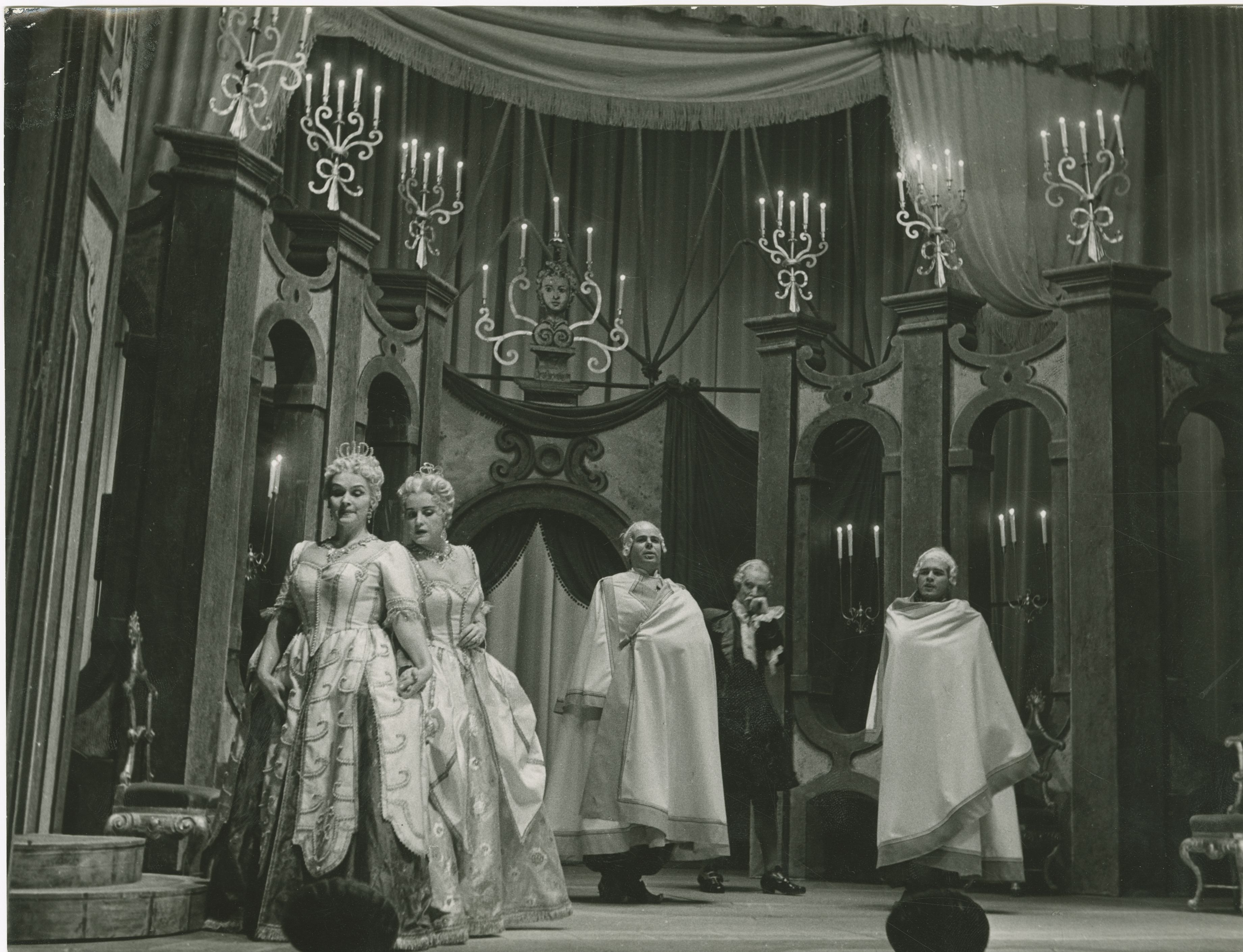
Scene of Così fan tutte. From left: Elisabeth Schwarzkopf, Nan Merriman, Rolando Panerai, Franco Calabrese and Luigi Alva. Milan, Piccola Scala, season 1955–56. Scenes and costumes by Eugene Berman.

Alva went to Milan in 1953 to study with Emilio Ghirardini and Ettore Campogalliani. He made his European debut at the Teatro Nuovo in Milan as Alfredo in Verdi's La traviata in 1954, following that as Paolino in Cimarosa's Il matrimonio segreto. His debut at the La Scala was in 1955 as Paolino in Cimarosa's Il matrimonio segreto in the opening of the Piccola Scala. He performed there in 1956 as Count Almaviva (which became his signature role) in Rossini's Il barbiere di Siviglia alongside Maria Callas as Rosina, the role for which he became best known and widely admired. He performed it at La Scala 330 times.

Subsequently he sang with most of the leading opera festivals and companies in the United States and Europe. He performed at the Salzburg Festival as Fenton in Verdi's Falstaff in 1957, as Mozarts Belmonte in Die Entführung aus dem Serail as well as Ferrando in Così fan tutte in 1967, and as Rossini's Count in 1968. He performed, especially in Mozart roles, at the Edinburgh Festival from 1957, at the Aix-en-Provence Festival and the Royal Opera House from 1960, at the Vienna State Opera from 1961. Alva first performed at the Glyndebourne Festival as Nemorino in Donizetti's L'elisir d'amore in 1961. In 1962 he made his debut with the Philadelphia Lyric Opera Company as Count Almaviva and in 1964 he made his first appearance at the Metropolitan Opera as Fenton; he went on to sing there in a further 101 performances 1975.

Alva had a light lyric tenor voice and was known for the clarity of his diction and his elegant phrasing, a quality which George Jellinek described as compensating for an "underpowered" voice in the 1956 live recording of Mozart's Così fan tutte from La Scala. He rarely ventured beyond his favourite repertoire, which included Mozart, Rossini, and Donizetti and to which (according to Harold Rosenthal) his "elegant, refined style" was particularly suited, but appeared in world premieres, such as in La donna è mobile by Riccardo Malipiero and in La domanda di matrimonio by Luciano Chailly, both at Piccola Scala in 1957. The following year he performed at La Scala in the house premiere of Janáček's The Cunning Little Vixen.

In 1980, he founded the Asociación Prolírica del Perú in Lima and served as its artistic director for several years. He retired from the stage in 1989, but sponsored the Premio Luigi Alva for young singers, taught master classes, and served as a juror in singing competitions. Alva also taught singing at La Scuola di Canto (Voice Academy) at La Scala in Milan. Among his students there was the Belgian tenor Marc Laho.

In 2005, the Peruvian postal service issued a stamp in his honour and in 2012 he was awarded the Personalidad Meritoria de la Cultura medal by the Peruvian Ministry of Culture.

Alva died in Mariano Comense, Italy on 15 May 2025, at the age of 98.

== Roles ==
Alva's repertoire included the following roles, most of which he played on stage:

Rossini:

- Conte d'Almaviva in Il barbiere di Siviglia
- Don Ramiro in La Cenerentola
- Lindoro in L'italiana in Algeri

Mozart:

- Don Ottavio in Don Giovanni
- Ferrando in Così fan tutte
- Alessandro in Il re pastore (recording, 1967)
- Tamino in Die Zauberflöte

Haydn:

- Lindoro in La fedeltà premiata (recording, 1976)
- Ecclittico in Il mondo della luna
- Gernando in L'isola disabitata (recording, 1977)
- Sempronio in Lo speziale

Cimarosa:

- Paolino in Il matrimonio segreto
- Filandro in Le astuzie femminili

Leoncavallo:

- Beppe in Pagliacci

Puccini:

- Venditore di canzonette in Il tabarro (recording, 1954)

Verdi:

- Alfredo in La traviata
- Fenton in Falstaff

Schubert:

- Alfonso in Alfonso und Estrella (recording, 1956)

Donizetti:

- Nemorino in L'elisir d'amore

Handel:

- Oronte in Alcina (recording, 1962)
- Serse in Serse

Gounod:

- Siébel in Faust

Scarlatti:

- Roberto in Griselda (recording, 1970)

== Filmography ==
External videos
- Luigi Alva in l barbiere di Siviglia (complete opera, 1972) on YouTube

- Falstaff (1956), Fenton
- Die Entführung aus dem Serail (1967), Belmonte
- Così fan tutte (1970), Ferrando
- The Barber of Seville (1972), Count Almaviva
- Don Pasquale (1972), Ernesto
- Lo speziale (1982), Sempronio

== Recordings ==
Opera

- Verdi: Falstaff – (as Fenton) Philharmonia Orchestra and Chorus conducted by Herbert von Karajan, EMI, 1956 OCLC 885043154
- Rossini: Il barbiere di Siviglia – (as Count Almaviva) Philharmonia Orchestra and Chorus conducted by Alceo Galliera, EMI, 1957 OCLC 611990413
- Mozart: Don Giovanni – (as Don Ottavio) Philharmonia Orchestra and Chorus conducted by Carlo Maria Giulini, EMI, 1959 OCLC 1314913070
- Mozart: Così fan tutte – (as Ferrando), John Alldis Choir and New Philharmonia Orchestra conducted by Otto Klemperer, EMI, 1971 OCLC 1184489695
- Haydn: La fedeltà premiata – (as Lindoro) with Ileana Cotrubas, Tonny Landy, Kari Lövaas, Maurizio Mazzieri, Frederica von Stade, Lucia Valentini Terrani and Alan Titus, Chœurs de la Radio Suisse Romande and the Orchestre de Chambre de Lausanne, conducted by Antal Doráti, 1976. OCLC 2678328
- Haydn: Il mondo della luna – (as Ecclitico) with Arleen Augér, Anthony Rolfe Johnson, Edith Mathis, Frederica von Stade, Lucia Valentini Terrani and Domenico Trimarchi, Chœurs de la Radio Suisse Romande and the Orchestre de Chambre de Lausanne conducted by Antal Doráti, 1978. OCLC 4623873

Recital

- Ay-Ay-Ay – Spanish and Latin American songs by Lara, Freire, Ponce, Sandoval, Padilla, Serrano, Álvarez, and Lacalle . New Symphony Orchestra of London conducted by Iller Pattacini. Decca, 1963 OCLC 658903917
