= Il mondo della luna =

Opera buffa by Joseph Haydn

- Opera buffa by Joseph Haydn
- Portrait of the composer by Thomas Hardy, in 1791
- Translation: The World on the Moon
- Librettist: Carlo Goldoni
- Language: Italian
- Premiere: 3 August 1777; Eszterháza

Il mondo della luna (The World on the Moon), Hob. XXVIII:7, is an opera buffa by Joseph Haydn with a libretto written by Carlo Goldoni in 1750, first performed at Eszterháza, Hungary, on 3 August 1777. Goldoni's libretto had previously been set by six other composers, first by the composer Baldassare Galuppi and performed in Venice in the carnival of 1750. It was then adapted for Haydn's version of the opera, which would be performed during the wedding celebrations of Count Nikolaus Esterházy, the younger son of Haydn's patron, Prince Nikolaus Esterházy, and the Countess Maria Anna Wissenwolf. It is sometimes performed as a singspiel under its German title Die Welt auf dem Monde.

== Roles ==
Roles, voice types, premiere cast
Role	Voice type	Premiere cast, 3 August 1777 Conductor: Joseph Haydn
Ecclitico, a would-be astrologer	tenor	Guglielmo Jermoli
Ernesto, a cavalier	contralto castrato	Pietro Gherardi
Buonafede	baritone	Benedetto Bianchi
Clarice, daughter of Buonafede	soprano	Catarina Poschwa
Flaminia, another daughter of Buonafede	soprano	Marianna Puttler
Lisetta, maid of Buonafede	mezzo-soprano	Maria Jermoli
Cecco, servant of Ernesto	tenor	Leopold Dichtler
Four scholars and noblemen

The roles of Ecclitico and Lisetta were written for Guglielmo Jermoli and his wife Maria Jermoli, but they left Eszterháza shortly before the premiere.

The opera is scored for two oboes, two bassoons, two horns, two trumpets, timpani, strings, and continuo.

== Synopsis ==
Time: early 18th century

Place: near Florence

=== Act 1 ===
A terrace in the house of the bogus astronomer Ecclitico; an observatory tower with a telescope. A starlit night, with full moon

Ecclitico and his four students sing a hymn to the Moon, and Ecclitico boasts of how he can dupe the foolish – such as Buonafede, who now appears. Buonafede does not have a clue what the Moon is. Ecclitico explains to him that through his powerful telescope he will be able to see the Moon's transparent surface all the way through the houses and able to spy on ladies as they undress before going to bed. Buonafede then attempts to view the Moon through Ecclitico's telescope while Ecclitico's servants move caricatures in front of the telescope's lens. The trick works: Buonafede describes what he thinks he has seen: a very beautiful young girl caressing an old man, a husband ready to punish his wife for her infidelity, and a man who completely dominates his female lover. He rewards Ecclitico with some coins and leaves.

Alone, Ecclitico muses that it is not the old man's money he wants, but to wed his daughter Clarice. Ernesto, a nobleman who is in love with Clarice's sister Flaminia, and his servant Cecco (in love with Buonafede's servant, Lisetta) now join Ecclitico. Buonafede intends to marry the sisters off to rich suitors.

Ecclitico assures Ernesto and Cecco that with a little money all their difficulties will be solved. In a more serious aria ("Begli occhi vezzosi"), Ernesto sings of Flaminia's eyes and awaits impatiently the moment in which the two of them will spend their lives together. Cecco, for his part, is convinced that everyone's playing games and insistently points out the comic side of life.

A room in Buonafede's house

The sisters Clarice and Flaminia dream of escaping their tyrannical father. In a long aria, Flaminia recognises that even if reason is to dominate the soul, when love intervenes it takes control of everything. Buonafede mocks Clarice's stubbornness but she answers back, threatening him that she will find a husband for herself if he is not capable of providing one for her. The two sisters are clearly differentiated: Clarice is down to earth and her arias are full of determined pragmatism. Buonafede invites Lisetta (his daughters' maid) to share the wonders he has seen through the telescope, in an attempt to win her over. Interested in his money, she reassures him of her love for him, her fidelity and her virtues, none of which is true. Ecclitico arrives and tells Buonafede that the Emperor of the Moon has invited him to his court. By drinking an elixir he will be transported to the Moon. Buonafede is tempted to travel with him and, therefore, asks for some of the liquor. Ecclitico agrees and, pretending to drink half of it, gives the rest to Buonafede who drinks it, falls asleep, and dreams of flying to the Moon. Clarice and Lisetta believe at first that he is dead, then console themselves with the inheritance they will be getting.

=== Act 2 ===
Ecclitico's garden, decorated so as to convince Buonafede that he is on the Moon

Ecclitico and Ernesto discuss the progress of their plot, and when Buonafede awakens he is convinced he is on the Moon. He is entertained by a ballet and clothed in elegant gowns. Ecclitico tells him that he will be joined by his daughters and servant. According to lunar custom the women will be meek. Cecco appears disguised as the Emperor of the Moon, with Ernesto as the star Hesperus. Buonafede, delighted with life on the Moon, is entertained by another ballet. When Lisetta enters, Buonafede tries to court her, but Cecco asks her to become Empress of the Moon. Lisetta, not fully aware of the plot, is at first puzzled. The two daughters arrive and pay homage to the Emperor in a nonsense ceremony. Flaminia goes off with Ernesto and Clarice with Ecclitico, while Cecco prepares to crown Lisetta as Empress. In the confusion of the masquerade, Buonafede is tricked into consenting to the three marriages, only realising that he has been duped when it is too late.

=== Act 3 ===
A room in Ecclitico's house

The conspirators, back in normal dress, have locked Buonafede in his own house – the price of his freedom will be forgiveness for his daughters and their dowries. At last he yields.

A starlit night with a full moon

Clarice and Ecclitico sing of their love. Buonafede repents of his previous strictness and there is general rejoicing and celebration.

== Music ==
The overture in C major is notable for its long development section and symphonic character. Re-used with reduced orchestration as the first movement of his Symphony No 63, in the opera it finishes on an open cadence.

Throughout the opera the key of E-flat is associated with the Moon; the 18th century often linked the key with darkness and sleep.

Critics have particularly praised the noble arias Haydn writes for his serious characters Flaminia and Ernesto and the evocative music for the flight to the Moon in act 1. Several numbers (vocal and instrumental) combine triple metre and a slow to moderato tempo. Flaminia's act 1 "Ragion nell'alma siede" has the typical form and coloratura of opera seria, while Lisetta's "Se lo comanda" in act 2 mixes comic and serious styles.

The sinfonia and ballet interludes in act 2 create an imaginary world through off-stage horns and bassoons and string harmonics. By contrast the G minor sinfonia which starts act 3 depicts the inner rage of the duped Buonafede.

Haydn re-used parts of the opera in trios for flute, violin and cello (Hob IV:6-11) and Ernesto's "Qualche volta non fa male" become the Benedictus of the Mariazeller Mass (Hob XXII:8).

== Performance history ==
The opera was conducted by Carlo Maria Giulini at the Holland Festival in 1959, the production also being seen and televised from the Aix-en-Provence Festival in July the same year, where Luigi Alva, Michel Hamel and Mariella Adani were among the cast. Conducted by Sergiu Comissiona it was performed in a staging by Etienne Glaser at Drottningholm in August 1969, with Margareta Hallin, Birgit Nordin as the daughters, Erik Saedén as Ernesto, Jonny Blanc as Ecclitico, and Claes-Håkan Ahnsjö as Cecco.

Jeff Clarke's The English Players revived the opera in 1992, and many other small and student opera companies have done so. Clarke's Opera della Luna, named for the piece, presented the work at the Ilford Opera Festival in 2006.

More recently a co-production was seen at the Berlin Staatsoper and Innsbruck Festival in 2002 conducted by René Jacobs, the work was presented as part of the 2008 Drottningholm Festival, and was produced in Vienna in December 2009, conducted by Nikolaus Harnoncourt, with Vivica Genaux. The Gotham Chamber Opera presented Il mondo della luna at the Hayden Planetarium in New York City in January 2010, transforming the planetarium into an opera house using the 180-degree dome and projections courtesy of NASA; the director was Diane Paulus.

Since December 2013 a production of this work has formed a part of the repertoire of the Moscow Chamber Musical Theatre named after Boris Pokrovsky. In October/November 2014, English Touring Opera took a new production of the work – titled Life on the Moon – on tour throughout England. Bampton Classical Opera performed the opera in a new English translation by Gilly French under the punning title Fool Moon in July 2022 conducted by Thomas Blunt.

== Recordings ==
- 1977 – Domenico Trimarchi (Buonafede), Edith Mathis (Clarice), Arleen Augér (Flaminia), Frederica von Stade (Lisetta), Lucia Valentini Terrani (Ernesto), Luigi Alva (Ecclitico), Anthony Rolfe Johnson (Cecco) – Chœurs de la Radio Suisse Romande, Orchestre de Chambre de Lausanne, Antal Doráti – 3 CDs (Philips Records). For more information, see Il mondo della luna (Antal Doráti recording)
- 2009 – Dietrich Henschel (Buonafede), Christina Landshamer (Clarice), Anja-Nina Bahrmann (Flaminia), Maite Beaumont (Lisetta), Vivica Genaux (Ernesto), Bernard Richter (Ecclitico), Markus Schäfer (Cecco), Concentus Musicus Wien, Nikolaus Harnoncourt – DVD (Unitel Classica)
