= La vera costanza =

Opera by Joseph Haydn

- dramma giocoso by Joseph Haydn
- Portrait of the composer by Thomas Hardy, in 1791
- Translation: True Constancy
- Librettist: Francesco Puttini
- Language: Italian
- Premiere: 25 April 1779; Eszterháza

La vera costanza (True Constancy), Hob. 28/8, is an operatic dramma giocoso by Joseph Haydn. The Italian libretto was a shortened version of the one by Francesco Puttini set by Pasquale Anfossi for the opera of the same name given in Rome in 1776. The story explores the troubles of a sentimental heroine abandoned by a mad lover.

== Performance history ==
The work was written for the Eszterházy court and was first performed on 25 April 1779. It was revived there in April 1785 when Haydn apparently had to re-create much of the opera from memory, the original having been largely lost. It was given in Bratislava, Budapest, Vienna and Brno between 1786 and 1792 under the title Der flatterhafte Liebhaber. The Vienna performance was directed by Wolfgang Amadeus Mozart. In Paris in 1791, it was performed as Laurette.

The opera was recorded in May 1976 by Philips in association with the Radio Suisse Romande & European Broadcasting Union. In 1980 the opera was given its United States premiere at the Caramoor Summer Music Festival with Kathryn Day as Rosina. Since 1980 the opera has revived on stage in Lyons (1980), Assisi (1982) Vienna (1982) Amsterdam (1990) and more recently, Reggio (2010) and London (2012). Bampton Classical Opera gave performances in 2004, in English, as did New Chamber Opera in 2020 (as a studio performance) and in 2024 in a new translation by Simon Rees.

== Roles ==
Role	Voice type	Premiere Cast, 25 April 1779 (Conductor: – )
Count Errico, secret husband of Rosina	tenor	Andrea Totti
Rosina, a fisherwoman	soprano	Barbara Ripamonti
Baroness Irene, Count Errico's aunt	soprano	Catharina Poschva
Lisetta, the baroness's maid	soprano	Marianna (Anna) Zannini
Marquis Ernesto, friend of Errico	tenor	Vito Ungricht
Masino, fisherman, Rosina's brother	tenor	Leopold Dichtler
Villotto, a wealthy but doltish gentleman	bass	Benedetto Bianchi

== Instrumentation ==
The opera is scored for one (or two) flutes, two oboes, two bassoons, two horns, timpani, strings, continuo.

== Synopsis ==
Act One
A village by the sea
A small boat has been driven ashore in a storm, and inhabitants of the fishing village help the four passengers to safety. The Baroness Irene, the local landowner, her maid Lisetta, Marquis Ernesto (who is hoping to marry the Baroness), and a wealthy fop, Villotto are offered shelter in the cottage of Masino, head fisherman, and his sister Rosina.
The Baroness has heard rumours of an unsuitable entanglement between Rosina and her headstrong nephew Errico. To prevent this alliance she has decided that Rosina must be married off immediately to the foolish Villotto. She explains to Rosina the advantages of such a rich marriage. Rosina’s embarrassment and reluctance are taken by the Baroness to be just modesty, but Rosina is actually already secretly married to the Count who abandoned her, and by whom she has a young son. Villotto is delighted by the idea of marrying Rosina but her brother Masino tries to convince him that he has no chance of winning her.
Count Errico arrives and threatens to shoot Villotto unless he abandons Rosina. Masino is then threatened by Ernesto; the Baroness has said that she will not marry him until her nephew is married, so it is in his interest for Rosina to accept Villotto immediately.
Villotto, after Errico’s threats, becomes more reluctant, much to the Baroness’s disgust. Lisetta adds to Masino’s confusion by declaring her love for him, and Errico decides to test Rosina’s constancy. He speaks to her scornfully and offers her to Villotto, who has decided to escape from his predicament by seeking fortune in war. The Count advises him that love and war require similar boldness. Rosina tells Lisetta of her misfortune, that five years ago, she met and married the Count. Villotto, inspired by the Count’s warlike talk resumes his attentions toward Rosina. Rosina appeals to the Baroness for death rather than a forced marriage with Villotto, Masino adds his voice, but the Baroness silences them both. A quarrel between Villotto and Masino is averted by Lisetta, who warns them that the Count and Ernesto are on their way. When Rosina begs for death, the Count embraces her; surprised by the Baroness the Count is shown a portrait of the woman she wishes him to marry. When he admires it Rosina fears that she has lost his love.
Act 2
Scene 1 The Baroness’s castle
Masino and Villotto are both bewildered by the circumstances. Ernesto pleads with Rosina to accept Villotto, explaining that he will then be able to marry the Baroness. This is overheard and misunderstood by the Baroness and the Count, who turn on Rosina. Villotto and Lisetta also reject her, and Rosina declares that death would be welcome for her were it not for her son, and she decides to flee. The Count infuriated by her apparent infidelity commands Villotto to pursue and kill her and her brother. Lisetta understands everyone’s mistake over what Ernesto said to Rosina, and comes to the Count saying that Rosina is indeed faithful to him and loves him. The Count, delirious and horrified at the thought of the murderous orders he has given Villotto, imagines himself to be Orpheus in search of his wife, rushes off to find her.
Scene 2 Rosina’s cottage and a partly ruined tower.
In despair, Rosina hides in the tower with her young son. Masino, exhausted from searching for her falls asleep. Villotto finds him, draws his sword but is stopped from killing him by Lisetta, who then meets the Baroness and Ernesto. She tries to explain Rosina’s innocence but they fail to understand and go in search of Rosina. The Count enters, sees a crying child (his own son) and the boy leads him to Rosina. The Count repents and as the couple embrace they are found by all the other characters, and defy the rage of the Baroness and Ernesto.
Act 3
To separate Rosina and the Count, the Baroness has sent each a forged letter (supposedly written by the other) breaking off the relationship. Although at first angry each soon sees through the deception and swear love to each other. The Count acknowledges his wife and son to the Baroness and Ernesto and Rosina asks for forgiveness from the Baroness, who accepts defeat and promises to marry Ernesto. All sing praise to constancy and virtue.

== Music ==
The overture leads directly to the opening 'shipwreck' sextet. Haydn's finales for Acts 1 and 2 aspire to the Mozartian ideal in their attention to details of textual structure, characterization, location and stage events, pointing to Haydn’s capable dramatic technique. Other highlights are the four-part aria with horns and timpani for the Count “A trionfar t’invita”, Rosina’s laments “Dove fuggo” and “Care spiagge”.

== Recordings ==
- 1977 – Jessye Norman (Rosina), Helen Donath (Lisetta), Claes H. Ahnsjö (Errico), Wladimiro Ganzarolli (Villotto Villano), Domenico Trimarchi (Masino), Kari Lövaas (Irene), Anthony Rolfe Johnson (Ernesto) – Orchestre de Chambre de Lausanne, Antal Doráti – 2 CDs (Philips Records). This is the first and only complete recording of La vera costanza. It was recorded as part of the Eszterhàza Opera Cycle on Philips, a project that Doráti started in the mid 1970s. He'd previously recorded the first widely-available cycle of Haydn's symphonies (Ernst Märzendorfer's cycle with the Vienna Chamber Orchestra was only available in the US) and had earned international fame as a Haydn conductor.

== Sources ==
- Clark, Caryl (1992), 'Vera costanza, La' in The New Grove Dictionary of Opera, ed. Stanley Sadie (London) ISBN 0-333-73432-7
