= La fedeltà premiata =

Opera by Joseph Haydn

- Opera by Joseph Haydn
- Title page of the libretto, 1782
- Translation: Fidelity Rewarded
- Language: Italian
- Based on: L'infedeltà fedele (The faithful infidelity) by Giambattista Lorenzi
- Premiere: 25 February 1781; Eszterháza

La fedeltà premiata (Fidelity Rewarded), Hob. XXVIII/10, is an opera in three acts by Joseph Haydn first performed at the Eszterháza palace in Fertőd, Hungary, on 25 February 1781 to celebrate the reopening of the court theatre after a fire. The opera was revised for a new version first performed in 1782.

== Composition and performance history ==
The main opera house adjoining the palace at Eszterháza had been destroyed by fire in November 1779; La fedeltà premiata, composed in 1780, inaugurated the new state-of-the-art theatre in the grounds which opened after major delays 15 months later. The opera was written during the most prolific period of Haydn's operatic composition between 1773 and 1783 when he composed eight Italian operas.

The libretto was adapted by Haydn and an anonymous colleague from Giambattista Lorenzi's L'infedeltà fedele, which had been set by Cimarosa in 1779. Haydn had access to Cimarosa's score, although the Neapolitan dialect and crude jokes were removed and the nine characters in the former setting reduced to eight by the conflation of two female roles. In its revised (and shortened) version, La fedeltà premiata is designated a dramma pastorale giocoso (a comic opera with pastoral elements).

The opera was revived twice in Eszterháza after 1782. In December 1784, Mozart attended a German-language production at the Theater am Kärntnertor in Vienna, the work of his future collaborator Emanuel Schikaneder. However, after some performances in Bratislava from 1785–87, as with all Haydn operas, it disappeared completely from the stage after his death.

In 1958, the BBC broadcast extracts from an incomplete manuscript. The first modern performance took place at the Holland Festival in 1970 and the first complete recording was made by Philips in 1976 in association with the Radio Suisse Romande and the European Broadcasting Union. The 1979 Glyndebourne stage production was due to be recorded by Southern Television.

The opera received its Munich première at the Cuvilliés Theatre on 25 March 2011 – 230 years after Mozart's Idomeneo, its exact contemporary, premièred at that venue. Christopher Ward led a performance by the Bavarian State Orchestra and singers of the Bavarian State Opera's Opera Studio.

== Roles ==
Roles, voice types, premiere casts
Role	Voice type	Premiere cast 25 February 1781 Conductor: Joseph Haydn	Revised version cast September 1782 Conductor: Joseph Haydn
Celia, her real name being Fillide	mezzo-soprano (1781) soprano (1782)	Maria Jermoli	Metilda Porta
Fileno, lover of Fillide	tenor	Guglielmo Jermoli	Antonio Specioli
Amaranta, a vain and arrogant lady	soprano	Teresa Taveggia	Maria Antonia Specioli
Count Perruchetto, a count of extravagant disposition	bass	Benedetto Bianchi	Vincenzo Moratti
Nerina, a nymph, fickle in love, enamoured of Lindoro	soprano	Costanza Valdesturla	Costanza Valdesturla
Lindoro, Amaranta's brother	tenor	Leopold Dichtler	Leopold Dichtler
Melibeo, High priest, in love with Amaranta	bass	Antonio Pesci	Domenico Negri
Diana	soprano	Costanza Valdesturla	
Nymphs and shepherds, hunters and huntresses, followers of Diana

== Synopsis ==
The people of Cumae worship Diana, goddess of hunting and chastity. Their rites however have been defiled by a nymph whose treachery has brought a curse on them. To propitiate the angry goddess, two faithful lovers must be sacrificed each year to a lake monster until a faithful lover can be found to offer his own life. Fidelity, therefore, is at a premium in Cumae, and victims are hard to find.

The plot is "part thriller about lovers being sacrificed to a monster, part burlesque sending up pseudo-classical and early romantic emotions".

=== Act 1 ===
A temple dedicated to Diana

Melibeo presides over preliminary rites on a day of sacrifice, assisted by Lindoro and Nerina, whose affair is coming to an end; Lindoro is tired of Nerina and hopes for a liaison with the shepherdess 'Celia'. Lindoro's sister Amaranta, recently arrived in Cumae, comes to worship. She is on the look-out for a lover but startled to hear of the risk in true love. Melibeo suggests that as High Priests are exempt, she might give her attentions to him. She agrees, on condition that he favours her brother's suit with Celia.

Perrucchetto, a traveller, philanderer and coward arrives claiming to have been chased by robbers. His racing pulse quickens when he sees Amaranta, to whom he swiftly declares love. She is also overcome, especially when discovering that he is a Count. Melibeo threatens Perrucchetto, who reacts by billeting himself on the High Priest.

A garden

Young shepherd Fileno laments the death of his beloved Fillide (Celia) killed by a snake. He is told by Nerina of Lindoro's desertion and she begs him to plead on her behalf; Fileno agrees (not realising that this is his beloved).

Another wood

Celia arrives wearily with her sheep in search of her lover Fileno and sleeps amongst her flock. Nerina returns with Fileno, who, to his amazement and delight recognises Celia – alive and well. He is unaware of the fatal penalty awaiting faithful lovers, but Celia, spotting Melibeo waiting to pounce, spurns Fileno to save his life: naturally he is angry and desolate.

Fileno, intent on self-destruction, goes off followed by Celia, who is followed by Lindoro and Perrucchetto, who sees in Celia a more enticing prospect than Amaranta, who in turn is offended and turns back to Melibeo. Perrucchetto, rejected by Celia returns to make peace with Amaranta but then chases Nerina, infuriating Amaranta.

A dark wood

Melibeo tries to blackmail Celia into the match with Lindoro suggested by Amaranta – she must consent or else die with Fileno. Celia asks Nerina to warn Fileno that his life is in danger. Although Nerina agrees to help, as she has now fallen in love with Fileno her help is not altogether disinterested.

As the first act reaches its climax, Melibeo has Fileno tied up. Fileno curses Celia when he learns she is to marry Lindoro. At this point Nerina enters pursued by satyrs who carry off numerous nymphs, including Celia.

=== Act 2 ===
A grove

Celia is rescued by shepherds. Melibeo takes stock of the situation. If he could make a match between Nerina and Fileno that would leave Celia free for Lindoro and then he can claim Amaranta. He encourages Nerina to use her charm on Fileno and allows her to release him from his bonds. Fileno is at first grateful, but seeing Celia with Lindoro pretends ardent love for Nerina to spite Celia. She remonstrates with Nerina who advises that she forget Fileno.

Fileno resolves to stab himself, but first carves a message of love to Celia on a tree trunk. However in doing this he breaks his dagger, so determines instead to throw himself off a cliff.

A mountainside

As he is about to do this, the hunt assembles in honour of Diana. Perrucchetto enters pursued by a bear, followed by Amaranta fleeing a boar. Perrucchetto takes refuge in a tree; Amaranta faints just as Fileno kills the boar. When she comes round, Perrucchetto claims that he saved her, but the boar is borne off to the temple.

A dreadful grotto

Celia finds the message on the tree and seeks solitude in a cave. Melibeo, seeing this, changes his plans again: if Nerina can lure Perrucchetto into the cave with Celia they can be 'framed' as lovers and sent to the monster. This is accomplished and the pair are robed as sacrificial victims. Thunder proclaims the wrath of Diana.

=== Act 3 ===
A hall, then a landscape with a view of the lake

The victims take leave of their real lovers. At the last moment Fileno decides to sacrifice his own life to save Celia. As he offers himself to the monster, it transforms itself into Diana who accepts the purity and selflessness of his act and for ever absolves Cumae from the fatal curse. Apart from Melibeo, struck down by Diana's arrows, the opera ends happily with the union of Celia and Fileno, Amaranta and Perrucchetto, and Nerina and Lindoro.

== Music ==
In this opera Haydn combined the worlds of opera seria and opera buffa, achieving a balance between the heroic and the comic and allowing himself to explore a wide variety of musical styles from serious emotions to hilarious parody.

On one hand, both the nobly-born characters Celia and Fileno have deeply felt cavatine early in the opera and later Celia contemplates her own death in a musically adventurous scene "Ah come il core".

On the other, Melibeo's "Mi dica, il mio signore" is comic and in act 2, the Count has a comic song "Di questo audace ferro" addressed to the not-quite-inert boar. The fright, cowardice and deranged state of Perrucchetto – whose name literally means "wig-maker" – are displayed in his breathless G minor entrance aria, which ends with a request for a bottle of Bordeaux wine.

While Amaranta's interaction with the others is usually comic, she is given a tender and tragic aria "Del amor mio fedele". This blurring of heroic and comic is also seen in the act 2 finale, where Haydn parodies Gluck's chorus of furies from Orfeo ed Euridice.

As one of the few operas by Haydn to be performed in Vienna (in German translation), La fedeltà premiata was almost certainly known by Mozart. The complex finale to act 1 is based around keys related by thirds (four moves down a third, then a half tone step) – possibly to represent the downwards progression of the plot – Robbins Landon has observed that this sequence is imitated in the opening numbers of Mozart's Così fan tutte. Haydn's key relationships in the act 2 finale are developed further in Così. Fileno's scena "Bastano i pianti" may likewise have made a deep and lasting impression on Mozart.

John Rice considers that the dramatic action of La fedeltà premiata moves forward with great energy, successfully solving the problems of dramatic pacing that detract from some of his other operas.

The overture was used by Haydn as the finale of his Symphony No 73 La Chasse (1781/82).

Celia's scene "Ah come il core" was published separately as a cantata for soprano and orchestra in 1782.

The work is scored for flute, 2 oboes, bassoon, 2 trumpets, 2 horns, timpani, violins I & II, viola, cello, bass and continuo. Celia's aria "Deh soccorri un infelice" includes a hand horn solo.

== Recordings ==
- 1976 – Lucia Valentini Terrani (Celia), Tonny Landy (Fileno), Frederica von Stade (Amaranta), Alan Titus (Perrucchetto), Ileana Cotrubaș (Nerina), Luigi Alva (Lindoro), Maurizio Mazzieri (Melibeo), Kari Lövaas (Diana) – Chœurs de la Radio Suisse Romande, Orchestre de Chambre de Lausanne, Antal Doráti – 3 CDs (Philips Records) See La fedeltà premiata (Antal Doráti recording).
- 1977 – Júlia Pászthy (Celia), Attila Fülöp (Fileno), Veronika Kincses (Amaranta), Gábor Vághelyi (Perrucchetto), Mária Zempléni (Nerina), István Rozsos (Lindoro), József Gregor (Melibeo), Ilona Tokody (Diana) – Franz Liszt Chamber Orchestra, Frigyes Sándor – 3 CDs (Hungaroton)
- 1999 – Monica Groop (Celia), John Aler (Fileno), Daniela Barcellona (Amaranta), Christopher Schaldenbrand (Perrucchetto), Patrizia Ciofi (Nerina), Simon Edwards (Lindoro), Charles Austin (Melibeo) – Padová Chamber Orchestra, David Golub – 3 CDs (Arabesque Records)
