= Il mondo della luna (Antal Doráti recording) =

- Philips LP: 6769 003

Studio album by Antal Doráti
- Released: 1978
- Studio: Grande Salle, Épalinges Theatre, Switzerland
- Genre: Opera
- Length: 211:44
- Language: Italian
- Label: Philips
- Producer: Erik Smith

Il mondo della luna
- Philips CD: 432 420–2

Il mondo della luna (The world on the moon) is a 211-minute studio album of Joseph Haydn's opera, performed by Luigi Alva, Arleen Augér, Anthony Rolfe Johnson, Edith Mathis, Frederica von Stade, Lucia Valentini Terrani and Domenico Trimarchi with the Chœurs de la Radio Suisse Romande and the Orchestre de Chambre de Lausanne under the direction of Antal Doráti. It was released on LP in 1978 and on CD in 1992. Its CD version included nine bonus arias of Haydn's, mostly written to be inserted into other composers' works, performed by Mathis and the Orchestre de Chambre de Lausanne under the direction of Armin Jordan.

== Background ==
At the time when the album was taped, no complete autograph score of the opera was known to exist. There were fragmentary autographs in collections in Berlin, Budapest, Cracow and Paris, and scholars had also found three contemporary copies – one, lacking Act 3, in Brussels, and two, complete, in Brno and Vienna. There are many inconsistencies between these various documents, reflecting the numerous revisions of his opera that Haydn undertook. The Vienna score was the principal source of the edition used by Doráti.

When Doráti approached Decca and other companies to suggest recording Haydn's operas, they rejected his proposal as too risky. Il mondo della luna and the other works in Doráti's Haydn cycle were only taped after Philips's producer, Erik Smith, had secured support from the European Broadcasting Union.

== Recording ==
The opera was recorded using analogue technology in September 1977 in the Grande Salle of the community theatre in Épalinges, a village high in the hills above Lausanne, Switzerland. The bonus arias included in the appendix of the CD issue of the album were recorded in the same location in June 1980.

== Packaging ==
The cover of the CD edition of the album was designed under the art direction of Ton Friesen and features photography by Hans Morren.

== Critical reception ==
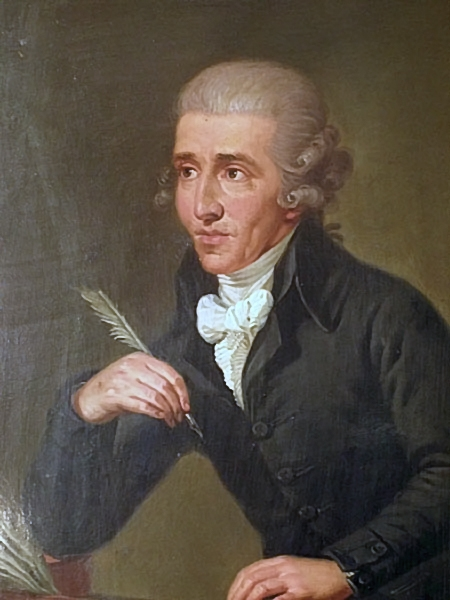
Joseph Haydn, portrayed by Ludwig Guttenbrunn

Lionel Salter reviewed the album on LP in Gramophone in September 1978. Il mondo della luna was a better drama than some of Haydn's other operas, he thought, in that it did not have a "cat's-cradle [plot] full of confusing intrigue and confused motivation". Its musical excellence was vouchsafed by Haydn's recycling eight excerpts from it in his flute trios, his Symphony No. 63 and the Benedictus of his Mariazell Mass. As for the album itself, it was blessed with a cast that was "an uncommonly strong one, almost without weakness". Domenico Trimarchi, "particularly alert to textual nuances", painted a persuasive portrait of Buonafede, the wealthy old innocent being duped by his daughters' and maidservant's lovers. Luigi Alva was equally enjoyable as Ecclitico, the bogus astronomer – styled an astrologer by a librettist too ignorant to know the difference – who tricked his future father-in-law into believing that he had been miraculously transported to the moon. Anthony Rolfe Johnson, playing the servant Cecco, "[made] the most of his moment of glory as the mock Lunar Emperor". The opera's other male role, Ernesto, originally an alto part sung by a castrato, was undertaken by Lucia Valentini Terrani in the album's least successful performance. Her voice was "at times less than ideally steady", and she seldom sounded convincingly masculine. Doráti's other female soloists sang impeccably. As Clarice, the darling of the star-gazing confidence trickster, Edith Mathis "[negotiated] the fioriture of 'Son fanciulla da marito' with brilliant clarity". As Clarice's sister Flaminia, Ernesto's best beloved, "that admirable stylist Arleen Augér [revelled] in her tremendous bravura aria 'Ragion nell'arma' ... and in the tender 'Se la mia stella'". And as Lisetta, the below-stairs mezzo wooed by Cecco, Frederica von Stade dispatched her helter-skelter comic numbers with apparently effortless virtuosity. In this particular opera, the contribution made by Haydn's orchestra was a more important ingredient than usual: he had responded to its extraterrestrial theme with a sopranino recorder, some unusual violin harmonics and imaginative echo effects. Happily Doráti's band played better for him on Il mondo della luna than on any of the other albums in his Haydn cycle. Philips's production team had done their work well too, although not quite perfectly – a duet seemed to have been edited clumsily, and at one point Trimarchi sounded anomalously far from his microphone. The album's one serious negative lay in Doráti's handling of its recitatives (vital to the opera's narrative coherence). They were far too slow, dragging on ad infinitum.

Eric Salzman reviewed the album on LP in Stereo Review in January 1979. He took a rather dimmer view of the opera than Salter. Its libretto, he wrote, was one of several "strained and overly sophisticated eighteenth-century comedies about human folly", and it was telling that Haydn had apparently struggled to work up much enthusiasm for composing it. All of his score was "solid stuff", but it was only in its pseudo-lunar Act 2 that his inventiveness truly flourished. At least the album presented the opera satisfactorily. The best of its soloists were Domenico Trimarchi as the credulous old gentleman and Frederica von Stade as a forerunner of the worldly-wise Despina. The runners-up for top honours were Anthony Rolfe Johnson, "modestly effective" in the stock opera buffa role of the comical servant, and Edith Mathis as one of Mr Good-faith's daughters. Luigi Alva's Ecclitico was marred by some less than perfect evenness. The orchestra's playing was nicely Haydnesque, and Doráti's conducting was "sensitive and stylish". A very appealing audio quality was the icing on the cake of a "highly commendable" album. People beginning to explore Haydn's operas would do better to start with the superior Orlando Paladino, but any confirmed Haydn enthusiast should certainly find an evening with Il mondo della luna time well spent.

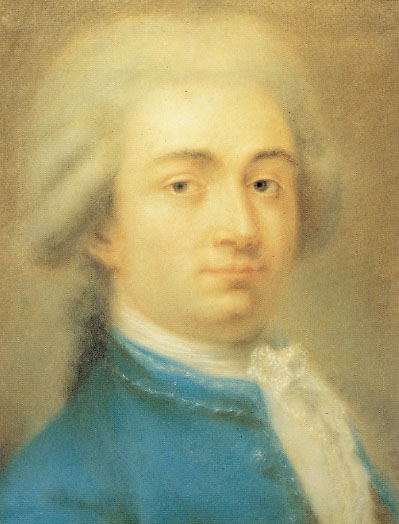
Carlo Goldoni portrayed in 1750

J. B. Steane reviewed the album on LP in Gramophone in April 1979, discussing it together with four other albums in Doráti's Haydn opera cycle. All five, he thought, were outstanding performances of music replete with vivacious musical fantasy. Each of them had many delightful arias, and his listening notes were peppered with asterisks and underlinings that made him want to put down his pen and go straight back to his turntable. Il mondo della luna was not quite as enjoyable as Orlando Paladino, the most impressive of the series to have appeared at that point, but it was still well worth investigating. "The records present an elegant, lightly ironical comedy", he wrote, "and an enchanting score. Beginning in laughter, it ends in affection: there is much more humanity in it than an outline of the plot might suggest."

Salter revisited the album in Gramophone in June 1993, reviewing it together with Doráti's other Haydn opera recordings when all eight albums were simultaneously issued on CD. Most of the operas suffered, he thought, from the ineptitude of their librettists, few of whom were anywhere near as good as Mozart's Lorenzo da Ponte. That said, the operas provided "superb opportunities for first-class singers", and Philips had been able to recruit a company of artists sufficiently accomplished to meet Haydn's challenges. "A great strength of [these albums]", he wrote, "is the very high standard of performance of music that is not only immensely demanding of the artists but extremely attractive to the listener". Further merits of the project were the sprightly playing of the Lausanne Chamber Orchestra and the wealth of documentation in Philips's booklets. Salter's opinion of Doráti's Il mondo della luna in particular was exactly the same as when he had heard the recording on LP. What especially delighted him about the album's CD version was the inclusion of nine newly released soprano arias as bonus tracks. Most were variations on the theme of a woman "indignant or cynical about the deception of men", but there was also a striking 1790 number written for an opera seria that seemed to be about the sack of Troy.

== Track listing, CD1 ==
Joseph Haydn (1732–1809)

Il mondo della luna, drama giocosa in tre atti (Eszterháza, 1777), Hob. XXVIII/7, libretto after Carlo Goldoni (1707–1793)

- 1 (4:14) Sinfonia (Ouverture)

Act One

- 2 (5:34) No. 1 Coro, Recitativo e Coro: "O Luna lucente, di Febo sorella" (Ecclitico, Chorus)
- Recitativo: "Basta, basta, discepoli" (Ecclitico)
- Coro: "Prendiamo, fratelli, il gran telescopio" (Chorus)
- 3 (5:21) Recitativo: "Oh le gran belle cose" (Ecclitico, Buonafede)
- 4 (1:58) No. 2 Coro: "Servitor, obbligato!" (Buonafede, Chorus, Ecclitico)
- Recitativo: "Olà, Claudio, Pasquine" (Ecclitico)
- 5 (6:15) No. 3 Intermezzo I
- Recitativo: "Il signor Buonafede" (Ecclitico, Buonafede)
- Aria I: "Ho veduta una ragazza" (Buonafede)
- Recitativo: "Se una ragazza fa carezze a un vecchio" (Ecclitico)
- Intermezzo II
- Recitativo: "Ho veduto, ho veduto!" (Buonafede, Ecclitico)
- Aria II: "Ho veduto un buon marito" (Buonafede)
- Recitativo: "Volesse il ciel" (Ecclitico)
- Intermezzo III
- Recitativo: "Oh questa assai mi piace!" (Buonafede, Ecclitico)
- Aria III: "Ho veduto dall' amante" (Buonafede)
- Recitativo: "E qui ancora si useria" (Ecclitico, Buonafede)
- 6 (3:25) No. 4 Aria: "La ragazza col vecchione" (Buonafede)
- 7 (2:43) Recitativo: "Io la caccia non fò alle sue monete" (Ecclitico, Ernesto, Cecco)
- 8 (3:35) No. 5 Aria: "Un poco di denaro" (Ecclitico)
- 9 (1:07) Recitativo: "Costui dovrebbe al certo esser ricco stondato" (Cecco, Ernesto)
- 10 (5:21) No. 6 Aria: "Begli occhi vezzosi dell' idolo amato" (Ernesto)
- 11 (0:42) Recitativo: "Qualche volta il pardon mi fa da ridere" (Cecco)
- 12 (2:53) No. 7 Aria: "Mi fanno ridere quelli che credono" (Cecco)
- 13 (3:01) Recitativo: "Eh venite, germana, andiam su quella loggia" (Clarice, Flaminia)
- !4 (4:53) No. 8 Aria: "Ragion nell' alma siede" (Flaminia)
- 15 (0:50) Recitativo: "Brava, signora figlia" (Buonafede, Clarice)
- 16 (2:58) No. 9 Aria: "Son fianculla da marito" (Clarice)
- 17 (2:22) Recitativo: "Se mandarla potessi nel mondo della luna" (Buonafede, Lisetta)
- 18 (4:02) No. 10 Aria: "Una donna come me" (Lisetta)
- 19 (7:40) Recitativo: "E poi la mia Lisetta è una buona ragazza" (Buonafede, Ecclitico)
- Recitativo accompagnato: "Ohimè! Sento un gran foco" (Buonafede, Ecclitico)
- 20 (5:44) No. 11 Finale I: "Vado, vado, volo, volo" (Buonafede, Ecclitico, Clarice, Lisetta)

== Track listing, CD2 ==
Act Two

- 1 (1:41) No. 12 Sinfonia
- 2 (4:03) Recitativo: "Ecco qui Buonafede nel Mondo della Luna" (Ecclitico, Ernesto, Buonafede)
- 3 (1:35) No. 13 Balletto
- Recitativo: "Bravi, bravissimi!" (Buonafede, Ecclitico)
- 4 (1:53) No. 14 Balletto
- Recitativo: "O che ninfe gentili" (Buonafede, Ecclitico)
- 5 (3:01) No. 15 Coro: "Uomo felice" (Chorus, Ecclitico, Buonafede)
- 6 (1:19) Recitativo: "Come avrò a contenermi?" (Buonafede, Ecclitico)
- 7 (2:54) No. 16 Aria: "Voi lo sapete" (Ecclitico)
- Recitativo: "Parmi che dica il vero" (Buonafede)
- 8 (1:40) No. 17 Marcia
- 9 (3:19) Recitativo: "Umilmente m'inchino a vostra maestà" (Buonafede, Cecco, Ernesto)
- 10 (4:25) No. 18 Aria: "Un avaro suda e pena" (Cecco)
- 11 (1:36) Recitativo: "Voi avete due figlie?" (Ernesto, Buonafede)
- 12 (4:01) No. 19 Aria: "Qualche volta non fa male" (Ernesto)
- 13 (1:51) Recitativo: "Io resto stupefatto" (Buonafede, Echo)
- 14 (5:19) No. 20 Aria con Balletto: "Che mondo amabile" (Buonafede)
- 15 (3:27) Recitativo: "Dove mi conducete?" (Lisetta, Ecclitico, Buonafede)
- 16 (3:00) No. 21 Duetto: "Non aver di me sospetto" (Buonafede, Lisetta)
- 17 (2:58) Recitativo: "Olà, presto fermate Buonafede e Lisetta" (Cecco, Buonafede, Lisetta)
- Recitativo accompagnato: "Lei è mio... ma se poi..." (Lisetta, Cecco)
- 18 (4:23) No. 22 Aria: "Se lo comanda, ci venire" (Lisetta, Cecco)
- 19 (1:21) Recitativo: "Eccelso imperator, la fortunata" (Buonafede, Cecco)
- 20 (1:08) No. 23 Balletto
- 21 (2:38) Recitativo: "Figlie mie care figlie" (Buonafede, Flaminia, Clarice, Cecco, Ernesto)
- 22 (4:33) No. 24 Aria: "Se la mia stella" (Ernesto)
- 23 (1:04) Recitativo: "Mia sorella sta bene, ed io cosa farò?" (Clarice, Cecco, Ernesto, Buonafede)
- 24 (4:03) No. 25 Aria: "Quanta gente che sospira" (Clarice)
- 25 (0:49) Recitativo: "Ed io son state qui con poca conclusione" (Lisetta, Cecco, Buonafede, Ecclitico)
- 26 (5:05) No. 26 Finale II: "Al comando tuo lunatico" (Ecclitico, Ernesto, Cecco, Buonafede, Lisetta, Clarice, Flaminia)
- 27 (1:36) "La man di Clarice d'Ecclitico sia" (Cecco, Ecclitico, Buonafede, Clarice, Ernesto, Flaminia, Lisetta)
- 28 (2:39) "Buonafede tondo" (Ecclitico, Cecco, Ernesto, Clarice, Flaminia, Lisetta, Buonafede)

== Track listing, CD3 ==
Act Three

- 1 (1:19) No. 27 Intermezzo
- 2 (3:13) Recitativo: "Voglio sortir, cospetto!" (Buonafede, Ecclitico, Ernesto, Cecco, Clarice)
- 3 (5:15) No. 28 Duetto: "Uncerto ruscelletto" (Ecclitico, Clarice)
- 4 (1:13) "Vien qui, figlia, m'abbraccia" (Buonafede, Clarice, Flaminia, Cecco, Ernesto, Ecclitico, Lisetta)
- 5 (2:08) No. 29 Finale III: "Dal Mondo della Luna" (All)

Appendix

Arias performed by Edith Mathis and the Orchestre de Chambre de Lausanne, conducted by Armin Jordan

- 6 (4:33) "Vada adagio, Signorina", Hob. XXIVb/12; aria for Cardellina in La Quakera spiritosa by Pietro Alessandro Guglielmi (1728–1804)
- 7 (5:18) "Infelice sventurata", Hob. XXIVb/15; aria for Beatrice in I due supposti conti by Domenico Cimarosa (1749–1801)
- 8 (5:21) "Miseri noi, misera patria"; recitative from Cantata Miseri noi, misera patria, Hob. XXIVa/7
- 9 (5:38) "Funesto orror di morte"; aria from Cantata Miseri noi, misera patria, Hob. XXIVa/7
- 10 (4:06) "Son pietosa, son bonina", Hob. XXXII/1b; aria for Lindora in La Circe, ossia L'isola incantata (Pasticcio)
- 11 (5:39) "D'una sposa meschinella", Hob. XXIVb/2; aria for Donna Stella in La Frascatana by Giovanni Paisiello (1740–1816)
- 12 (4:06) "Sono Alcina e sono ancora", Hob. XXIVb/9; cavatina for Alcina in L'isola di Alcina by Giuseppe Gazzaniga (1743–1818)
- 13 (4:21) "Chi vive amante", Hob. XXIVb/13; aria for Errisena in Alessandro nell'Indie by Francesco Bianchi (1752–1810)
- 14 (6:16) "Solo e pensoso", Hob. XXIVb/20; aria, Sonetto XXVIII from Il Canzoniere by Petrarch (1304–1374)

== Personnel ==
=== Musicians ===
- Domenico Trimarchi, baritone: Buonafede, an elderly gentleman
- Arleen Augér (1939–1993), soprano: Flaminia, daughter of Buonafede
- Edith Mathis, soprano: Clarice, daughter of Buonafede
- Frederica von Stade, mezzo-soprano: Lisetta, Buonafede's chambermaid
- Lucia Valentini Terrani (1946–1998), contralto: Ernesto, a cavalier, in love with Flaminia
- Luigi Alva, tenor: Ecclitico, a bogus astronomer, in love with Clarice
- Anthony Rolfe Johnson (1940–2010), tenor: Cecco, Ernesto's servant, in love with Lisetta
- Pablo Loerkens, cello
- Fritz Widmer, double bass
- Chœurs de la Radio Suisse Romande (chorus master: André Charlet)
- Orchestre de Chambre de Lausanne
- Armin Jordan (1932–2006), conductor (bonus tracks)
- Antal Doráti (1906–1988), harpsichord continuo and conductor

=== Other ===
- Erik Smith (1931–2004), producer

== Release history ==
In 1978, Philips released the album as a set of four LPs (catalogue number 6769 003) and also on cassette (catalogue number 7699 078), both issues being accompanied by texts and translations and notes by Marc Vignal.

In 1992, Philips issued the album on CD (catalogue number 432 420–2), packaged in a slipcase with a 240-page booklet. The booklet provided a libretto, a synopsis and essay by Marc Vignal and an essay about the bonus arias by Erik Smith, all in English, French, German and Italian. There were also photographs of the soloists and conductor, and pictures of Haydn and of the title page and cast list of the libretto that was printed for the opera's first performance. Philips also issued the album in a 20-CD box set that included all of Antal Doráti's Haydn opera recordings (catalogue number 438 167–2).
