= Erik Smith =

German-born British producer, pianist and harpsichordist

Erik George Sebastian Smith (25 March 1931 – 4 May 2004) was a German-born British record producer, pianist and harpsichordist. He produced over 90 opera recordings. His greatest legacy is the 1991 complete recording of the entirety of Wolfgang Amadeus Mozart's compositions, which included many previously unheard fragments and was released for the bicentenary of Mozart's death.

== Life and career ==
Smith was born in Rostock, the son of the German conductor Hans Schmidt-Isserstedt. His Jewish mother took him from Germany in 1936, with his brother, to be brought up in England. He did his tertiary education at Corpus Christi College, Cambridge.

Through his friendship with the American pianist Julius Katchen he joined the Decca company as a record producer, working with such people as John Culshaw and Gordon Parry.

In 1958 he produced the first recording of Peter Grimes, conducted by the composer, Benjamin Britten. He also produced the first recording of Mozart's opera La clemenza di Tito, with the conductor István Kertész, in 1967.

Smith formed the London Wind Soloists and the Vienna Mozart Ensemble in order to record the complete wind music and the complete dances and marches of Mozart. Many of these were premiere recordings.

In 1967 he moved to Philips. Here, he produced a series of Haydn operas, many early Verdi operas, Tippett's The Midsummer Marriage, and Berlioz's The Trojans and Benvenuto Cellini. Many of these were premiere recordings.

In 1991 he created The Complete Mozart Edition, on 180 CDs. He completed some of Mozart's unfinished works, such as the finale of the String Quartet, K. 464. The compilation won a Gramophone Special Achievement Award in 1991.

After his formal retirement in 1991 he continued to devote time to projects such as Mitsuko Uchida's cycle of Schubert sonatas.

He won Grammy Awards in 1971, 1973, 1976 and 2003; in total Smith won 5 Grammys and was nominated 22 times.

His newspaper obituaries described Erik Smith as a "record producer of infallible taste with Decca and then Philips", a "record producer breaking new ground with Mozart and Berlioz", and "one of the world's foremost classical record producers".

Smith died on 4 May 2004, survived by his wife Priscilla and two daughters, Miranda and Susanna.

== Partial discography ==
- Haydn: La fedeltà premiata (Antal Doráti recording)
- Haydn: Il mondo della luna (Antal Doráti recording)

== See also ==
- List of British Grammy winners and nominees
