= Christian Zacharias =

German pianist and conductor (born 1950)

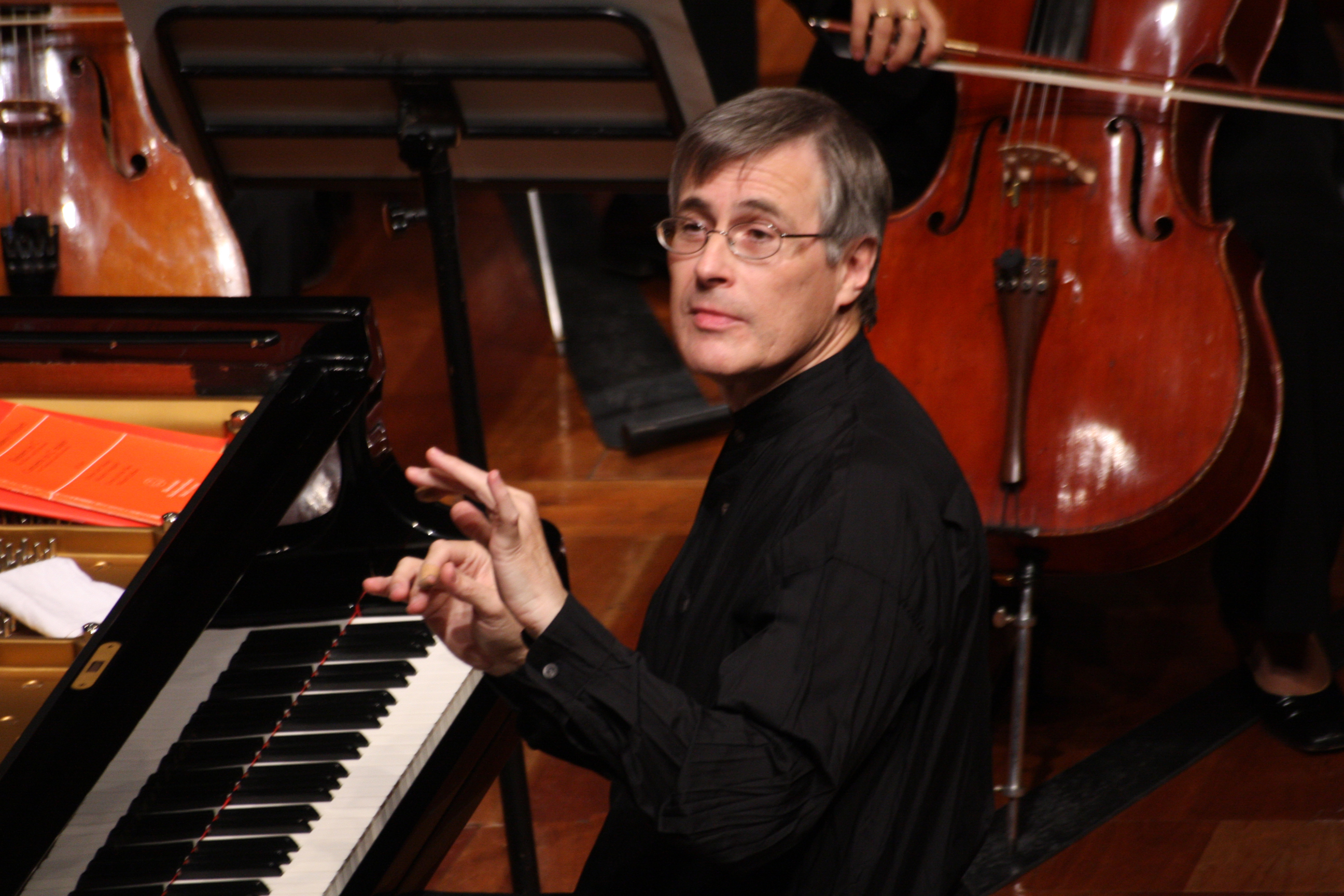
- Born: 27 April 1950 (age 76); Jamshedpur, India
- Occupations: Classical pianist; Conductor
- Website: Christian-zacharias.com

Christian Zacharias (born 27 April 1950) is a German pianist and conductor who made an international career.

== Music career ==
Zacharias was born in Jamshedpur, India, on 27 April 1950. He studied piano with Irene Slavin and Vlado Perlemuter in Paris. He won second prize at both the Geneva Competition in 1969 and the Van Cliburn International Piano Competition in 1973. After winning the Ravel Competition in Paris in 1975, he launched an international career. He has performed chamber music with such partners as the Alban Berg Quartet, the Guarneri Quartet, the Leipzig String Quartet, Heinrich Schiff, and Frank Peter Zimmermann. He made many recordings, among them a 1979 recording of 33 sonatas by Domenico Scarlatti, the complete Schubert piano sonatas, the complete Mozart piano concertos (available on EMI classics), and the complete Beethoven piano concertos.

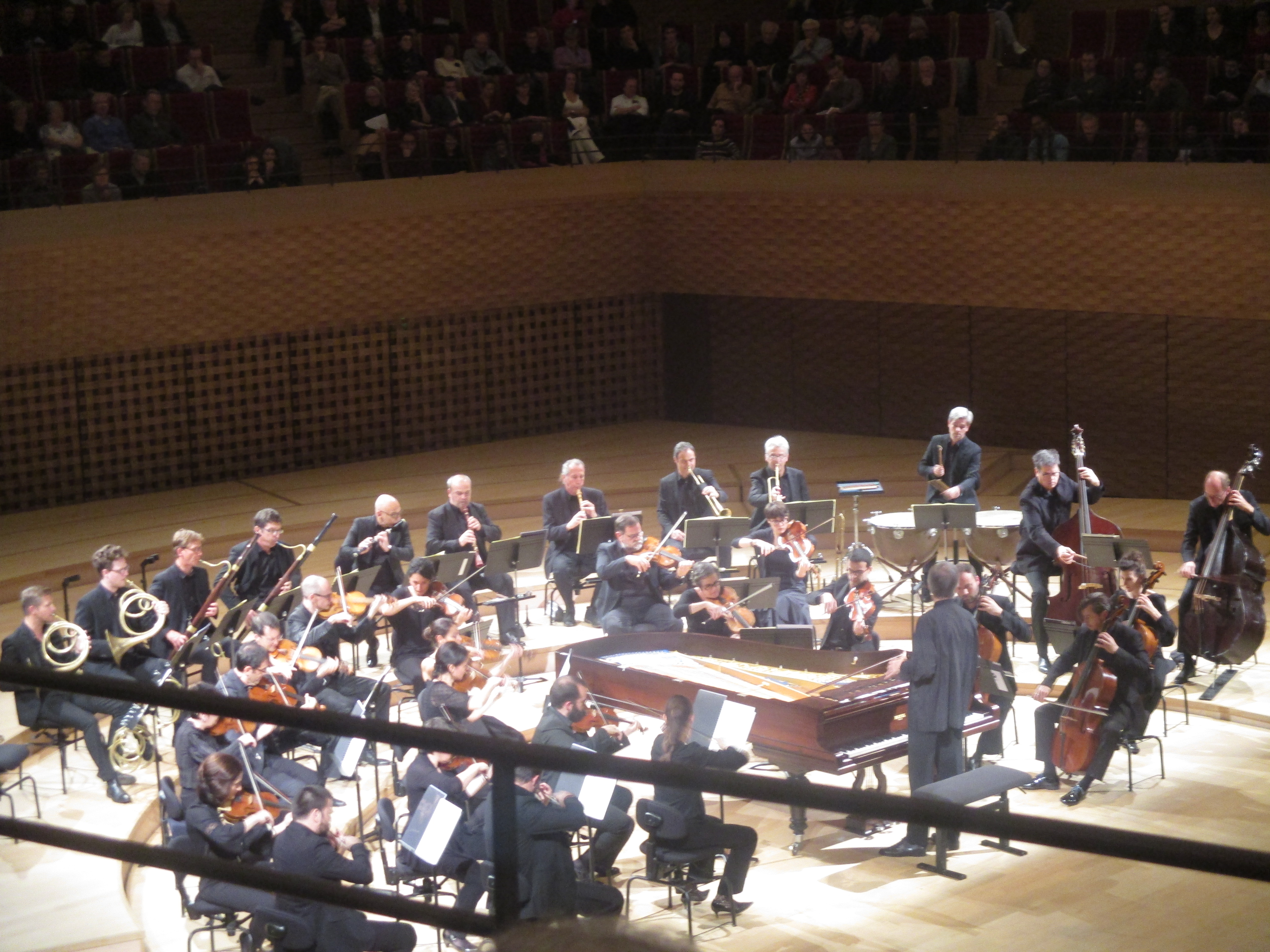
Christian Zacharias conducting the Insula Orchestra at La Seine Musicale

He began his conducting career in 1992 with the Orchestre de la Suisse Romande in Geneva. He made his US debut in 2000 with the Los Angeles Philharmonic before assuming the role of artistic director of the Orchestre de Chambre de Lausanne. He has since held posts as principal guest conductor of the Gothenburg Symphony Orchestra and as an Artistic Partner with the Saint Paul Chamber Orchestra. In 2020, Zacharias was appointed honorary conductor of the George Enescu Philharmonic Orchestra.

| Preceded by Jesús López-Cobos | Artistic Director, Orchestre de Chambre de Lausanne; 2000-present | Succeeded by Joshua Weilerstein |
