= Orchestre de Chambre de Lausanne =

Swiss chamber orchestra based in Lausanne

- Orchestra
- Short name: OCL
- Founded: 1942; 84 years ago
- Location: Lausanne, Switzerland
- Concert hall: Salle Métropole
- Principal conductor: Renaud Capuçon
- Website: Official website

The Orchestre de Chambre de Lausanne (OCL, Lausanne Chamber Orchestra) is a Swiss chamber orchestra based in Lausanne, Switzerland. The OCL is resident at the Salle Métropole in Lausanne. The OCL is an artistic partner with Lausanne Opera and regularly performs with the company as its orchestra during its opera season. The OCL is subsidized by the city of Lausanne and the canton of Vaud and is a member of the Swiss Association of Professional Orchestras. The majority of its concerts are recorded by the Lausanne-based radio station Espace 2.

== History ==
Victor Desarzens founded the OCL in 1942 and was its first artistic director, through 1973. Subsequent artistic directors have been Armin Jordan (1973–1985), Lawrence Foster (1985–1990), Jesús López Cobos (1990–2000), Christian Zacharias (2000–2013), and Joshua Weilerstein (2015–2021). Renaud Capuçon is artistic director, a position he has held since the 2021–2022 season. In July 2024, the OCL announced the appointment of Dominique Meyer as its next executive director, effective 15 July 2024.

The OCL was the first Swiss orchestra to engage a composer-in-residence every two years. The OCL also collaborates on a regular basis with musical institutions of higher learning in the city, including the Haute Ecole de Musique de Lausanne and the Haute Ecole de Théâtre de Suisse Romande.

== Recordings ==
The OCL's discography includes a series of 1970s recordings for Philips of eight operas of Franz Joseph Haydn with Antal Dorati as conductor, as follows:

- La fedeltà premiata (1975): Lucia Valentini Terrani, Frederica von Stade, Ileana Cotrubas, Luigi Alva
- La vera costanza (1976): Jessye Norman, Helen Donath, Claes-Håkan Ahnsjö, Domenico Trimarchi
- Orlando Paladino (1977): Arleen Auger, Elly Ameling, Claes-Håkan Ahnsjö, Domenico Trimarchi
- L'isola disabitata (1977): Linda Zoghby, Norma Lehrer, Luigi Alva, Renato Bruson
- Il mondo della luna (1978): Arleen Auger, Edith Mathis, Frederica von Stade, Domenico Trimarchi
- Armida (1978): Jessye Norman, Claes-Håkan Ahnsjö, Norma Burrowes, Samuel Ramey
- L'incontro improvviso (1979–80): Claes-Håkan Ahnsjö, Margaret Marshall, Della Jones, Benjamin Luxon
- L'infedeltà delusa (1981): Edith Mathis, Barbara Hendricks, Michael Devlin, Claes-Håkan Ahnsjö

These recordings were re-issued in 2004 and in 2009. Other recordings by the OCL have included a complete recording of the Piano Concertos of Wolfgang Amadeus Mozart, performed and conducted by Christian Zacharias for the German label MDG. For Outhere Music, the orchestra has released recordings of Louis Spohr's complete Clarinet Concertos, performed and led by Paul Meyer, in 2012, as well as a recording of music of Arnold Schoenberg with Heinz Holliger released in the autumn of 2013. For Deutsche Grammophon, Renaud Capuçon has recorded the complete violin concertos of Mozart with the OCL.

== Artistic directors ==
- Victor Desarzens (1942–1972)
- Armin Jordan (1973–1985)
- Lawrence Foster (1985–1990)
- Jesús López-Cobos (1990–2000)
- Christian Zacharias (2000–2013)
- Joshua Weilerstein (2015–2021)
- Renaud Capuçon (2021–present)
