= La fedeltà premiata (Antal Doráti recording) =

- Philips Classics LP: 6707 028

Studio album by Antal Dorati
- Released: 1976
- Studio: Grande Salle, Épalinges Theatre, Switzerland
- Genre: Opera
- Length: 162:09
- Language: Italian
- Label: Philips Classics
- Producer: Erik Smith

La fedeltà premiata
- Philips Classics CD: 432 430-2

La fedeltà premiata ("Fidelity rewarded") is a 162-minute studio album of Joseph Haydn's opera, performed by Luigi Alva, Ileana Cotrubas, Tonny Landy, Kari Lövaas, Maurizio Mazzieri, Frederica von Stade, Lucia Valentini Terrani and Alan Titus with the Chœurs de la Radio Suisse Romande and the Orchestre de Chambre de Lausanne under the direction of Antal Doráti. It was released in 1976.

== Background ==
La fedeltà premiata was first performed in 1781. When it was revived in 1782, Haydn shortened and rearranged his opera and introduced extensive transpositions to accommodate recasting: Celia was changed from a mezzo-soprano to a soprano and Count Perrucchetto from a bass to a tenor, the Count gaining another aria in the process. The score used in Doráti's album is the edition compiled by the Haydn scholar H. C. Robbins Landon, which is based on Haydn's original version. The album presents Haydn's music in its entirety, except for some minor cuts to recitativo secco marked as optional by Haydn himself. Stanley Sadie wrote that as far as he was aware, the album was the first complete recording of the opera ever made.

When Doráti first approached Decca and other companies to suggest recording Haydn's operas, they rejected his proposal as too risky. La fedeltà premiata and the other works in Doráti's Haydn cycle were only taped after Philips's producer, Erik Smith, had secured support from the European Broadcasting Union.

== Recording ==
The album was recorded using analogue technology in June 1975 in the community theatre of Épalinges, a village high in the hills above Lausanne, Switzerland.

== Packaging ==
The cover of the CD version of the album was designed under the art direction of Ton Friesen, and features photography by Hans Morren.

== Critical reception ==
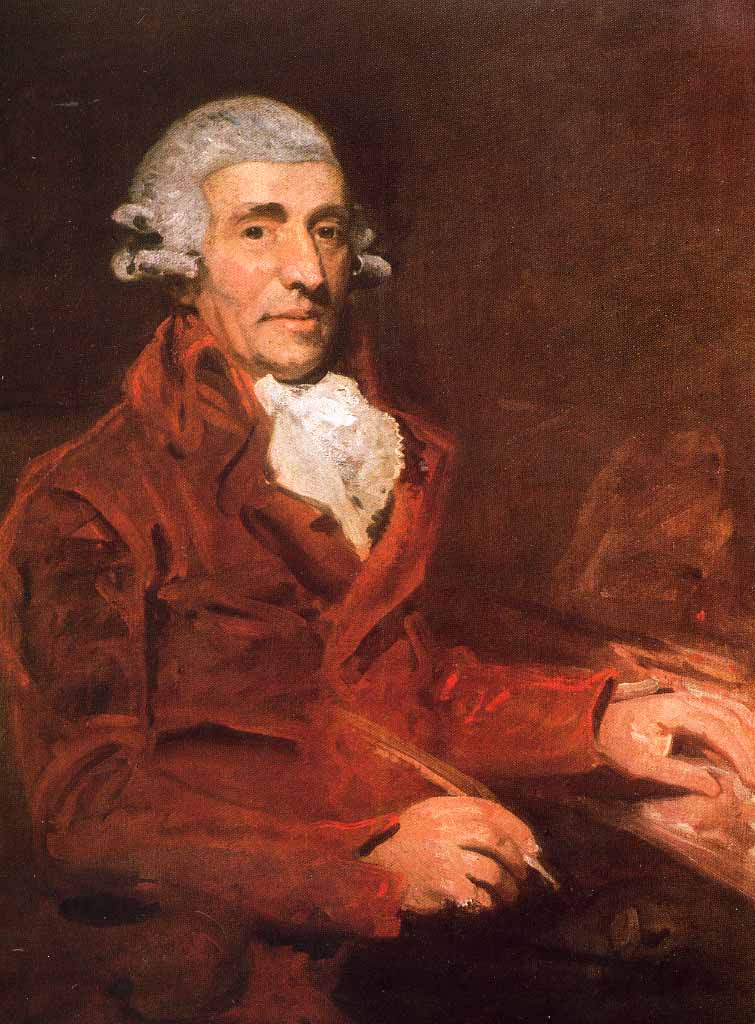
Joseph Haydn portrayed by John Hoppner in 1791, ten years after La fedeltà premiata's première

The musicologist Stanley Sadie reviewed the album on LP in Gramophone in September 1976. After a long preamble sketching La fedeltà premiata's storyline and acknowledging the opera's dramatic and musical limitations, he praised the album for its strong cast and committed performances. Lucia Valentini Terrani, he thought, provided "fine-drawn tone and firmly held line". Ileana Cotrubas was "delicious", her Act 1 aria "a joy, sweetly phrased, staccato and legato singing neatly contrasted". Frederica von Stade sang with power and a tight focus, "quite properly doing [her] mock-heroic music in genuinely heroic style". Alan Titus made up for his occasional hardness of tone with his skill in rapid articulation. Maurizio Mazzieri was "resonant and reasonably secure". Luigi Alva was "as warm and eloquent as ever". If there was a weak link among the cast, it was Tonny Landy - he was full-voiced and musically and dramatically intelligent, but he was also sometimes clumsy and did not always pay enough attention to his words. Doráti conducted vivaciously, although he sometimes allowed his orchestra to get away with imprecision in ensembles. The audio was clear and judiciously balanced; the stereo soundstage was exploited to good effect. In sum, the album was "a set well worth having: warmly recommended".

Alan Rich reviewed the album on LP in the New York Magazine on 20 June 1977. He devoted most of his critique to an attack on the opera itself. It had "little of the enterprise and sense of experimentation" of Haydn's contemporaneous symphonies. It exemplified the Esterhazy household's penchant for "stiff, formalized moral comedy of a rather old-fashioned sort". It featured "long stretches of pure eighteenth-century formula stuff". Rich conceded, though, that the opera did contain at least some interesting music and "some lithe, elegant, melodic writing", and he praised the singing of Ileana Cotrubas and Frederica von Stade as "sumptuous".

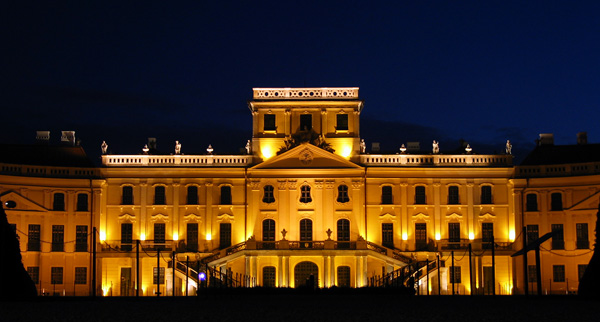
Eszterháza. The palace's opera house was where La fedeltà premiata was first performed in 1781

Lionel Salter reviewed the album on CD in Gramophone in June 1993. He agreed with Sadie that the opera's libretto was a poor one, but noted that "Haydn was unusually, and justifiably, proud of its music and of his delineation of character". Like H. C. Robbins Landon, Salter greatly admired the elaborate architecture of both the opera's finales. He also broadly shared Sadie's high opinion of the album's cast. Luigi Alva was "on top form", Ileana Cotrubas was "enchantingly frivolous" and Frederica von Stade was "pungent and brilliant". (It was von Stade who provided the album with its emotional climax, he thought, in "a beautiful and heartfelt lament" in Act 2.) The soloists' only peccadillos were an irritating beat in Lucia Valentini Terrani's voice and Tonny Landy's failure to invest his words with sufficient meaning. Reviewing the album together with its seven companions in Doráti's box set of Haydn operas, he summed up the collection as providing a "very high standard of performance of music that is not only immensely demanding of the artists but extremely attractive to the listener".

The album was further discussed in The Penguin Guide to Opera on Compact Disc (1993), The Penguin Guide to Compact Discs and Cassettes (1994), David Wice's Illustrated History of Opera (1994) and Clyde T. McCants's American Opera Singers and Their Recordings (2004)

== Track listing, CD1 ==
Joseph Haydn (1732-1809)

La fedeltà premiata, drama pastorale giocoso in tre atti (Eszterháza, 1781), Hob. XXVIII/10, with a libretto by Haydn and an unknown colleague after L'infedltà fedele by Giambattista Lorenzi

- 1 (3:30) Sinfonia

Act One

- 2 (3:54) Introduzione: Coro: "Bella dea, che in ciel risplendi" (Chorus, Nerina, Lindoro, Melibeo)
- Recitativo accompagnato: "Tacete, tacete" (Melibeo)
- 3 (3:23) "Prendi, prendi, o Diana" (Amaranta)
- Coro: "Bella dea, che in ciel risplendi" (Chorus)
- 4 (3:13) Recitativo: "Non più, Ninfe, pastori" (Melibeo, Amaranta, Nerina, Lindoro)
- 5 (2:21) Aria: "Già mi sembra di sentire" (Lindoro)
- 6 (0:32) Recitativo: "Di tuo fratello al pari" (Melibeo, Amaranta)
- 7 (1:41) Aria e Recitativo accompagnato: "Per te m'accese amore" (Amaranta, Melibeo)
- 8 (2:30) Aria: "Selvo... aiuto..." (Perrucchetto)
- 9 (2:11) Recitativo: "Signor, per ristorarvi" (Melibeo, Perrucchetto, Amaranta)
- 10 (3:06) Aria: " Mi dica, il mio signore" (Melibeo)
- 11 (0:45) Recitativo: "Corpo di Bacco! È innamorato" (Perrucchetto, Amaranta)
- 12 (4:19) Aria: "Dove, oh dio, rivolgo il piede" (Fileno)
- 13 (2:39) Recitativo: "Chi mai provò nell'alma" (Fileno, Nerina)
- 14 (3:45) Aria: "È amore di natura" (Nerina)
- 15 (3:35) Aria: "Placidi ruscelletti" (Celia)
- 16 (4:56) Recitativo: "Misera Fille, e quando" (Celia, Nerina, Fileno, Lindoro, Melibeo, Amaranta, Perrucchetto)
- 17 (3:17) Aria: "Miseri affetti miei" (Fileno)
- 18 (0:44) Recitativo: "È partito" (Amaranta, Lindoro, Celia, Melibeo, Perrucchetto)
- 19 (2:57) Aria: "Vanne... fuggi... traditore!" (Amaranta)

== Track listing, CD2 ==
Act One, continued

- 1 (1:05) Recitativo: "Non occorrono pianti" (Melibeo, Celia, Nerina)
- 2 (5:13) Aria: "Deh soccorri un'infelice" (Celia)
- 3 (0:37) Recitativo: "Questa è pazza senz'altro" (Nerina, Perrucchetto)
- 4 (3:43) Aria: "Coll'amoroso foco" (Perrucchetto)
- 5 (0:14) Recitativo: "E si sdegna di più" (Amaranta, Melibeo, Lindoro)
- 6 (3:01) Finale: "Questi torti, questi affronti" (Amaranta, Melibeo, Lindoro)
- 7 (2:41) "Ah non tremarmi tanto" (Celia, Lindoro)
- 8 (2:14) "Ah villana alle selve incallita" (Amaranta, Melibeo, Lindoro, Perrucchetto, Nerina)
- 9 (2:22) "Lasciami... lasciami... "(Celia, Amaranta, Perrucchetto, Melibeo, lindoro)
- 10 (4:10) "Se non si trova, oh dio" (Filena, Celia, Amaranta, Melibeo, Perrucchetto, Lindoro)
- 11 (4:50) "Aiutatemi... son morta..." (Nerina, Lindoro, Perrucchetto, Melibeo, Amaranta, Fileno, Celia)

Act Two

- 12 (1:14) Recitativo: "A me simile affronto" (Melibeo, Nerina)
- 13 (3:17) Aria: "Sappi, che la bellezza" (Melibeo)
- 14 (1:52) Recitativo: "Vengo Fileno pur; vedranno tutti" (Nerina, Fileno, Lindoro, Celia)
- 15 (4:10) Aria: "Se da' begli occhi tuoi" (Fileno)
- 16 (0:35) Recitativo: "Già la fera è ne' lacci" (Nerina, Lindoro, Celia)
- 17 (2:50) Aria: "Volgi pure ad altr'oggetto" (Nerina)
- 18 (1:31) Coro di Cacciatori: "Più la belva nel bosco non freme" (Chorus)
- 19 (3:04) Recitativo: "Ecco, amici, le selve" (Melibeo, Amaranta, Perrucchetto, Fileno, Lindoro)
- 20 (3:10) Aria: "Di questo audace ferro" (Perrucchetto)
- 21 (0:51) Coro di Cacciatori: "Più la belva nel bosco non freme" (Chorus)

== Track listing, CD3 ==
Act Two, continued

- 1 (4:30) Recitativo accompagnato: "Bastano, bastano i pianti" (Fileno)
- 2 (3:01) Aria e Recitativo accompagnato: "Recida il ferro istesso" (Fileno)
- 3 (0:21) Aria: "Eterni dei!" (Celia)
- 4 (4:41) Recitativo accompagnato: "Ah come il core mi palpito nel seno!" (Celia)
- 5 (8:41) Aria: "Ombra del caro bene" (Celia)
- 6 (2:22) Recitativo: "Si, Celia e Perrucchetto distruggere conviene" (Melibeo, Nerina, Amaranta, Lindoro)
- 7 (1:36) Recitativo accompagnato: "Barbaro conte... è questa la mercè" (Amaranta)
- 8 (5:45) Aria: "Dell'amor mio fedele" (Amaranta)
- 9 (0:52) Recitativo: "Ah temo, il tuo periglio" (Nerina, Melibeo, Fileno)
- 10 (4:00) Finale: "Quel silenzio e quelli pianti" (Fileno, Nerina, Lindoro)
- 11 (2:16) "Si vada... si soccorra" (Amaranta, Nerina, Fileno, Lindoro)
- 12 (2:08) "Queste due vittime, casta Diana" (Melibeo, Amaranta, Nerina, Fileno, Lindoro)
- 13 (2:52) "Perfido cielo ingrato!" (Celia, Perrucchetto, Melibeo, Fileno, Amaranta, Nerina, Lindoro)
- 14 (2:36) "Via si cada, ché la dea" (Melibeo, Celia, Perrucchetto, Amaranta, Fileno, Nerina, Lindoro)

Act Three

- 15 (0:33) Recitativo: "Fillide! Oh dio!" (Fileno, Celia)
- 16 (5:31) Duetto: "Ah se tu vuoi ch'io viva" (Celia, Fileno)
- 17 (2:13) Recitativo: "Pastori, in sulla sponda" (Melibeo, Perrucchetto, Amaranta, Lindoro, Fileno)
- 18 (3:16) Recitativo accompagnato: "Misero me!" (Melibeo, Amaranta, Celia, Fileno, Lindoro, Perrucchetto, Diana)
- 19 (1:21) Coro: "Quanto più diletta e piace" (All)

== Personnel ==
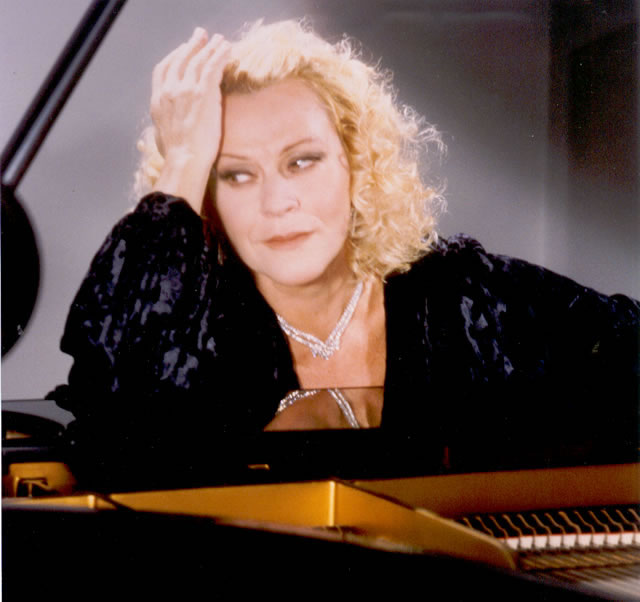
Lucia Valentini Terrani

=== Performers ===
- Lucia Valentini Terrani (1946-1998, contralto), Fillide, going by the name of Celia
- Tonny Landy (tenor), Fileno, lover of Fillide
- Frederica von Stade (mezzo-soprano), Amaranta, a vain and arrogant lady
- Alan Titus (baritone), Count Perrucchetto, an aristocrat of extravagant disposition
- Ileana Cotrubas (soprano), Nerina, a Nymph, fickle in love, enamoured of Lindoro
- Luigi Alva (tenor), Lindoro, brother of Amaranta, in the service of the Temple of Diana, at first in love with Nerina, later with Celia
- Maurizio Mazzieri (baritone), Melibeo, High Priest of the Temple of Diana, in love with Amaranta
- Kari Løvaas (soprano), Diana, Goddess of the Hunt
- Michel Perret, harpsichord
- Pablo Loerkens, cello
- Fritz Widmer, double-bass
- Chœurs de la Radio Suisse Romande
- André Charlet, chorus master
- Orchestre de Chambre de Lausanne
- Antal Doráti (1906-1988), harpsichord and conductor

=== Other ===
- Erik Smith (1931-2004), producer

== Release history ==
In 1976, Philips Classics released the album as a set of four LPs (catalogue number 6707 028) with a booklet containing notes, texts and translations. The album was not issued on cassette.

In 1993, Philips Classics issued the album on CD (catalogue number 432 430–2), packaged in a slipcase with a 204-page booklet. The booklet contained libretti, synopses by Erik Smith and an essay by H. C. Robbins Landon, all in English, French, German and Italian. It was illustrated with images of Haydn and the title page of a libretto printed for his opera's première, and with production photographs of Alva, Cotrubas, Doráti, Landy, Lövaas, Mazzieri, von Stade, Valentini Terrani and Titus taken by Klaus Hennich. Philips Classics also issued the album with seven other of Doráti's recordings of Haydn's operas in a 20-CD box set (catalogue number 438 167–2).
