= List of British Grammy Award winners and nominees =

The following is a list of Grammy Award winners and nominees from the United Kingdom. Amongst the winners, Paul McCartney and Adele are the most honoured male and female British artists respectively. Adele also is the most awarded female foreign act in Grammy history as well as one of three artists who have won all four General Field awards.

== List ==
Nominee	Wins	Nominations	Ref.
Paul McCartney	19	83	
Sting	17	45	
Eric Clapton	17	37	
Tom Elmhirst	17	23	
Adele	16	25	
George Harrison	12	39	
Ringo Starr	10	29	
Tim Handley	10	12	
Mark Ronson	9	18	
Phil Collins	8	27	
The Beatles	8	25	
Robert Plant	8	21	
Jeff Beck	8	17	
Coldplay	7	39	
John Lennon	7	34	
Peter Gabriel	7	22	
Jacob Collier	7	16	
Brian Eno	7	14	
Barry Gibb	6	16	
Mark Knopfler	6	17	
The Chemical Brothers	6	15	
Amy Winehouse	6	8	
Elton John	5	37	
Erik Smith	5	22	
David Bowie	5	19	
Ozzy Osbourne	5	12	
Bee Gees	5	9	
The Police	5	8	
Sam Smith	5	7	
Mick Jagger	4	19	
Ed Sheeran	4	17	
Annie Lennox	4	15	
Seal	4	15	
The Rolling Stones	4	13	
Olivia Newton-John	4	12	
Sade	4	9	
John Barry	4	8	
Robert Orton	4	7	
Radiohead	3	18	
Dua Lipa	3	10	
Charli XCX	3	10	
Harry Styles	3	9	
Wet Leg	3	6	
Yehudi Menuhin	2	10	
George Michael	2	9	
Mumford & Sons	2	9	
James Blake	2	9	
Dire Straits	2	7	
Fleetwood Mac	2	7	
Imogen Heap	2	7	
Van Morrison	2	7	
Corinne Bailey Rae	2	6	
Jimmy Page	2	6	
Sheena Easton	2	6	
Julie Andrews	2	5	
Muse	2	5	
Vernon Reid	2	5	
Black Sabbath	2	4	
Cynthia Erivo	2	4	
The Cure	2	4	
Simon Climie	2	3	
Duran Duran	2	2	
Steve Barnett	2	2	
Elvis Costello	1	15	
Rod Stewart	1	15	
Alan Parsons	1	13	
Gorillaz	1	12	
Mike Rutherford	1	11	
21 Savage	1	11	
Graham Nash	1	8	
Eurythmics	1	7	
Fatboy Slim	1	6	
Joss Stone	1	5	
Calvin Harris	1	5	
Genesis	1	5	
Judas Priest	1	5	
Peter Frampton	1	5	
Yes	1	5	
Boy George	1	4	
Ella Mai	1	4	
Iron Maiden	1	4	
Motörhead	1	4	
Pink Floyd	1	4	
Billy Ocean	1	3	
Duffy	1	3	
Jamiroquai	1	3	
Estelle	1	3	
Led Zeppelin	1	3	
Yungblud	1	3	
Aphex Twin	1	2	
Dave Russell	1	2	
Dirty Vegas	1	2	
FKA twigs	1	2	
La Roux	1	2	
Lola Young	1	2	
Clean Bandit	1	1	
Flowdan	1	1	
Foxes	1	1	
Jess Glynne	1	1	
Joe Alwyn	1	1	
John Jones	1	1	
Jethro Tull	1	1	
Nicola Benedetti	1	1	
Olivia Dean	1	1	
Disclosure	0	7	
Florence and the Machine	0	7	
PJ Harvey	0	7	
Arctic Monkeys	0	9	
Pet Shop Boys	0	6	
Depeche Mode	0	5	
James Blunt	0	5	
Franz Ferdinand	0	5	
Paul Young	0	5	
Mike and the Mechanics	0	4	
Queen	0	4	
Raye	0	4	
UB40	0	4	
Yola	0	4	
Average White Band	0	3	
Bonnie Tyler	0	3	
Emerson, Lake & Palmer	0	3	
Foreigner	0	3	
Gerry Rafferty	0	3	
James Bay	0	3	
Kate Bush	0	3	
Leona Lewis	0	3	
Paul Oakenfold	0	3	
Simply Red	0	3	
The 1975	0	2	
Andy Gibb	0	2	
Arlo Parks	0	2	
Asia	0	2	
Craig David	0	2	
David Gray	0	2	
Duke Dumont	0	2	
Keane	0	2	
King Crimson	0	2	
Lisa Stansfield	0	2	
M.I.A.	0	2	
Oasis	0	2	
The Prodigy	0	2	
Robbie Williams	0	2	
Susan Boyle	0	2	
The Who	0	2	
Adam and the Ants	0	1	
Alt-J	0	1	
Anne-Marie	0	1	
Bastille	0	1	
Blur	0	1	
Brian Nash	0	1	
Bring Me the Horizon	0	1	
Cradle of Filth	0	1	
Daniel Bedingfield	0	1	
Dido	0	1	
Donovan	0	1	
Ellie Goulding	0	1	
Fred Again	0	1	
Glass Animals	0	1	
Jessie J	0	1	
Jorja Smith	0	1	
KT Tunstall	0	1	
Labrinth	0	1	
Lewis Capaldi	0	1	
Lily Allen	0	1	
Lisa Milne	0	1	
Michael Kiwanuka	0	1	
Mika	0	1	
MNEK	0	1	
Morrissey	0	1	
Natasha Bedingfield	0	1	
New Order	0	1	
Nic Fanciulli	0	1	
Richard Bedford	0	1	
Rick Astley	0	1	
Slowthai	0	1	
Shirley Bassey	0	1	
The Verve	0	1	
Wolf Alice	0	1	
