= Kari Løvaas =

Norwegian operatic soprano (1939–2025)

- Lovaas in 1992
- Born: 13 May 1939; Skien, Norway
- Died: 24 April 2025 (aged 85); Schaffhausen, Switzerland
- Other names: Kari Lövaas
- Education: Oslo Conservatory of Music; Wiener Musikakademie
- Occupation: Classical soprano

Kari Løvaas (Note: Løvaas has made her international career using the German spelling of her family name, Kari Lövaas or Kari Lövaas-Gerber.) (13 May 1939 – 24 April 2025) was a Norwegian operatic soprano who made an international career. She performed at international festivals such as the Salzburg Festival and the Lucerne Festival in both opera and concert. She participated in complete recordings of rarely performed operas, including works by Haydn and composers of the 20th century, recorded Lieder and regularly appeared in choral concerts.

== Life and career ==
Born in Skien on 13 May 1939, Løvaas grew up near Brekkeparken in Skien where she also had one of her first appearances. In 1955, she was accepted by the Oslo Conservatory of Music, aged 16, studying piano and voice, under the mentorship of Ingeborg Vorbeck.

She made her opera debut as "Nuri" in Eugen d'Albert's Tiefland in the opening performance at the Norwegian National Opera and Ballet on 16 February 1959 on the recommendation of Kirsten Flagstad who had sung the same role for her debut. She was then offered the role of Pamina in Mozart's The Magic Flute at the Norwegian Opera and appeared in two productions. The performances earned her a government scholarship, and traveled to Vienna where she studied at the Musikakademie from 1960 to 1963.

She was a member of the ensemble of the Dortmund Opera in the 1963/64 season, followed by the Staatstheater Mainz to 1966. She had guest roles at several operas in Scandinavia, including in Oslo in 1966. She performed at major opera houses in Europe, the United States, Australia and Japan, and at international festivals. At the Salzburg Festival she appeared in 1969 as Marianne Leitmetzerin in Der Rosenkavalier by Richard Strauss, and in 1970 as Barbarina in Mozart's Le nozze di Figaro in a production by Günther Rennert conducted by Karl Böhm. On 20 August 1973, she was one of the sybils in the premiere of Carl Orff's De temporum fine comoedia at the Salzburg Festival, conducted by Herbert von Karajan, which was recorded. She sang the soprano solo in Rossini's Petite messe solennelle at the Münchner Festwochen the same year, and the Lucerne Festival, with Wolfgang Sawallisch as the pianist and conductor, alongside Brigitte Fassbaender, Peter Schreier and Dietrich Fischer-Dieskau. The performance had been recorded live the previous year at the Baumburg Abbey. In 1973, she appeared in her first Wagner role, as Sieglinde in Die Walküre at the Zurich Opera. She appeared as Forzana in a performance of Wagner's Die Feen at the Münchner Opernfestspiele of 1983, conducted by Sawallisch and recorded. She also performed at festivals in Vienna and Bergen.

Løvaas roles included Euridice in Gluck's Orfeo ed Euridice, Micaela in Bizet's Carmen, Tatjana in Tchaikovsky's Eugen Onegin, Mimi in Puccini's La bohème, Marie in Smetana's The Bartered Bride, Julia in Heinrich Sutermeister's Romeo und Julia, and Tatiana in Tchaikovsky's Eugene Onegin. She also performed songs by Bach, Handel, Mozart and Beethoven. She sang regularly as a soloist in concerts with the Wiener Singverein, conducted by Walter Hornsteiner, such as Bach's Mass in B minor at the Stiftskirche Reichersberg, Franz Schmidt's The Book with Seven Seals at the Niederaltaich Abbey, and Bruckner's Te Deum in Passau Cathedral.

In recordings of complete operas, she performed several parts in rarely recorded works. In 1971, she appeared as Louise in Lortzing's Die Opernprobe, conducted by Otmar Suitner. She sang Haydn operas with Antal Doráti, Diana in La fedeltà premiata in 1975, and Baroness Irene in La vera costanza a year later. A reviewer noted of her performance of a dramatic aria in the latter work that "she shows her excellent range and instinct for theatrical combustibility". She sang the role of Laura in Weber's Die drei Pintos in 1976, conducted by Gary Bertini, and performed a title role in Othmar Schoeck's Vom Fischer und syner Fru in 1977, conducted by Rudolf Kempe. She sang the role of Die Rothaarige in Werner Egk's Peer Gynt in 1981, conducted by Heinz Wallberg, and the role of Iole in Lou Harrison's Hercules in 1984, conducted by Dieter Hauschild. She recorded Lieder by Grieg, Sibelius and R. Strauss with the Berliner Symphoniker. She also recorded Alban Berg's "Sieben frühe Lieder" in the orchestral version with the NDR Sinfonieorchester conducted by Herbert Blomstedt.

Løvaas married Manfred Gerber and lived in Schaffhausen, Switzerland. She died there on 24 April 2025, at the age of 85.

== Recordings ==
- Lövaas, Kari; Marturet, Eduardo; Berliner Symphoniker (1993). Kari Lövaas sings songs by Grieg, Sibelius and Strauss (in German). Staufen (Breisgau): Aurophon. OCLC 1183502645.
- Lortzing, Albert; Naxos Digital Services US (2012). Lortzing, A.: Opernprobe (Die) (Suitner). Hong Kong: Naxos Digital Services US Inc. OCLC 885049575.
- Grieg, Edvard; Sibelius, Jean; Musorgsky, Modest; Lövaas, Kari; Werba, Erik (1971). Das Kind der Berge : op. 67 : Liederzyklus nach der Erzählung "Haugtussa" von Arne Garborg (gesungen in norwegischer Sprache) (in undetermined language). [Hamburg]: Dt. Grammophon. OCLC 165855435.
- Britten, Benjamin; Lövaas, Kari; Roden, Anthony; Adam, Theo; Scherzer, Manfred; Kegel, Herbert; Penderecki, Krzysztof; Berg, Alban; Rundfunkchor Leipzig; Dresdner Kapellknaben; Dresdner Philharmonie; Rundfunk-Sinfonie-Orchester Leipzig (2009). War Requiem. Hong Kong: Naxos Digital Services/Berlin Classics. OCLC 704902348.
- Handel, George Frideric; Soffel, Doris; Dijkstra, Hebe; Lövaas, Kari; Büchner, Eberhard; Zahn, Dieter; Polster, Hermann Christian; Vogel, Reinhart; Sommerfeld, Andreas; Klug, Peter; Tomaszewski, Rolf; Kaltofen, Gisela; Hauschild, Wolf-Dieter; Rundfunk-Sinfonie-Orchester Leipzig; Rundfunkchor Leipzig (2009). Hercules (in German). [Berlin]: Berlin Classics. OCLC 767864123.
- Rossini, Gioacchino; Fassbaender, Brigitte; Fischer-Dieskau, Dietrich; Lövaas, Kari; Sawallisch, Wolfgang; Schreier, Peter; Münchner Vokalisten (1972). Petite messe solennelle : for 4 solo voices, double quartet, 2 pianos and harmonium. [Germany]: RCA. OCLC 1027503999.
- Wagner, Richard (1984). Die Feen. Orfeo. OCLC 841926525.
- Offenbach, Jacques; Kalisch, Ludwig; Dallapozza, Adolf; Rothenberger, Anneliese; Kusche, Benno; Jüten, Grit van; Dieberitz, Gerd W.; Lövaas, Kari; Lindner, Brigitte; Gruber, Ferry; Lingen, Theo; Litz, Gisela; Schmitz, Hans Wolfgang; Mattes, Willy; Bühnen der Stadt Köln Chor der Oper Köln; Philharmonia Hungarica (2011). Orpheus in der Unterwelt buffoneske Oper in zwei Akten = Orphée aux enfers (in German). Köln: EMI Music Germany. OCLC 1184300294.
- Theodōrakēs, Mikēs; Lövaas, Kari; Madjarova, Violeta; Larin, Sergej; Emmerlich, Gunther; Kühn, Pavel; Stašek, Čestmír; Kegel, Herbert; Československý Rozhlas Sbor; Československý Rozhlas Detský Sbor; Dresdner Philharmonie (1994). Symphony No. 7. Cologne: Intuition Classics. OCLC 1057452051.
- Haydn, Joseph; Dorati, Antal; Cotrubas, Ileana; Von Stade, Frederica; Valentini-Terrani, Lucia; Alva, Luigi; Landy, Tonny; Mazzieri, Maurizio; Lovaas, Kari; Titus, Alan; Kammerorchester, Lausanne; Choeur de la Radio Suisse Romande (1976). La fedelta premiata : dramma pastorale giocoso. Philips. OCLC 221666558.
