= Ilse von Alpenheim =

Austrian pianist (1927–2026)

- Born: 11 February 1927; Innsbruck, Tyrol, Austria
- Died: 11 April 2026 (aged 99)
- Genres: Classical
- Instrument: Piano

Ilse Margaretha Clara Helff-Hibler von Alpenheim (11 February 1927 – 11 April 2026) was an Austrian-Swiss pianist.

== Life and career ==
Born in Innsbruck, she was initially trained by her mother Hermine Helff-Hibler von Alpenheim née Brunner, a piano teacher, and made her first public appearance as a soloist at the age of nine in Joseph Haydn's Piano Concerto Hob. XVIII,11. Starting from 1944 she studied with Winfried Wolf in Kitzbühel and, from 1946 to 1948, with Franz Ledwinka at the Mozarteum at Salzburg. In 1951 she moved to Switzerland.

In 1955 she met Sándor Veress, a Hungarian composer, with whom she lived for over a decade. She was instrumental in promoting the piano works of Veress. Between 1962 and 1969 she was in charge of a piano class at the Conservatory of Berne. In 1971, she married the Hungarian-American conductor and composer Antal Doráti, who wrote several works for her and with whom she developed an intensive international concert activity.

Her career took her to four continents where she appeared in recitals and as a soloist with many prominent orchestras. Her chamber music partners included Max Rostal, Henryk Szeryng, Igor Ozim, Walter Grimmer, the Berner Streichquartett the Amadeus Quartet and the Camerata Bern.

Von Alpenheim's repertory focused mainly on the classical and early romantic composers. She recorded all the Haydn piano sonatas, concertini and concerti. The sonatas were issued on CD by the Antal Doráti Centenary Society in 2015. She also made an integral recording of the Songs Without Words by Mendelssohn. As pianist of the Arion Trio (together with Igor Ozim and Walter Grimmer), she recorded all Mozart's piano trios and the complete works of Schubert for piano and strings.

Ilse von Alpenheim died on 11 April 2026 in Muri-Gümligen near Berne at the age of 99.

== Weblinks ==
Ilse von Alpenheim: Joseph Haydn, The Piano Sonatas https://www.youtube.com/watch?v=9KTgA1i06xU
