= Missa Cellensis =

Mass by Joseph Haydn

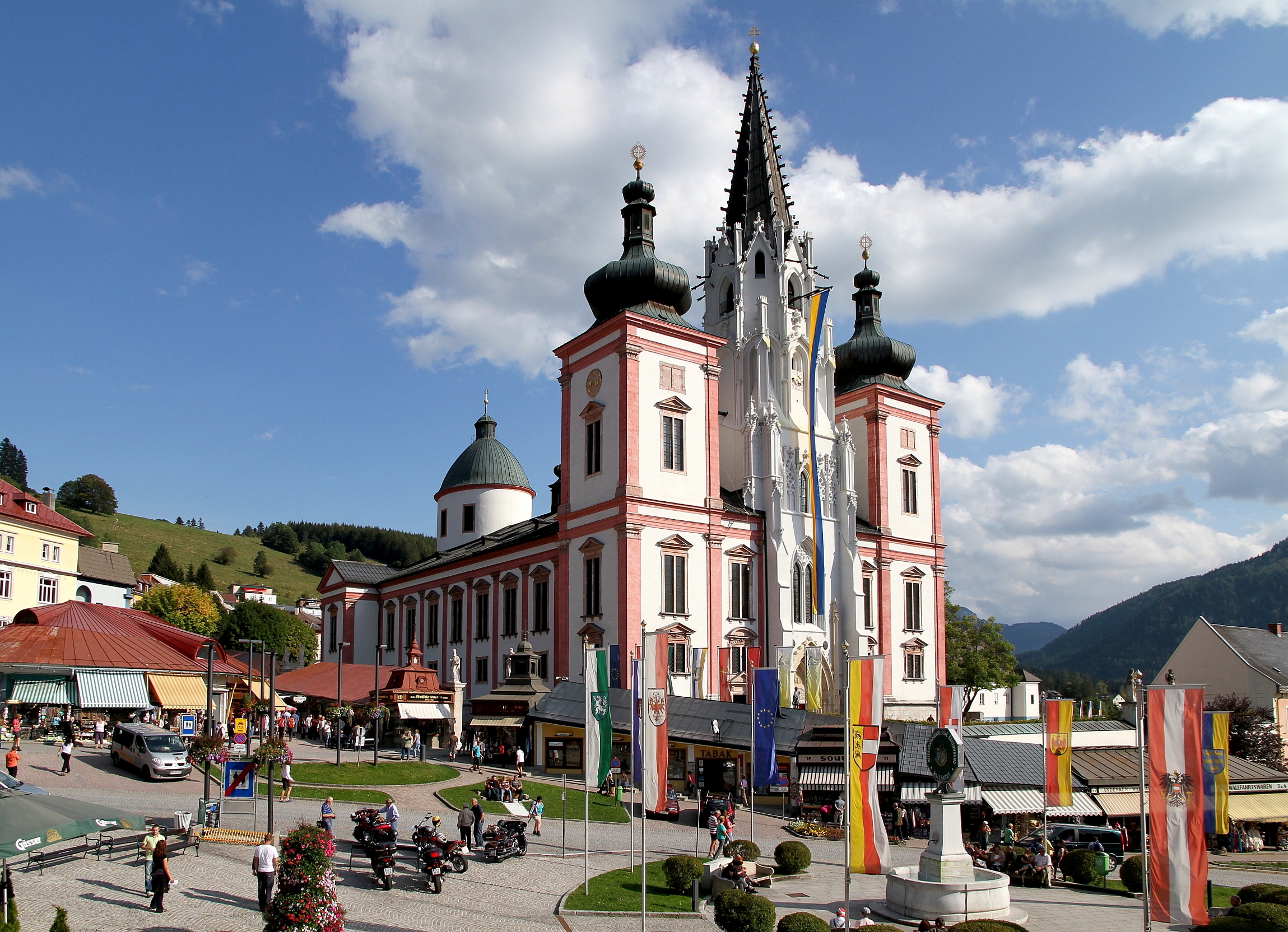
Mariazell Basilica

The Missa cellensis, Hob. XXII:8, fully Missa cellensis fatta per il Signor Liebe de Kreutzner (Zell Mass made for Sir Liebe of Kreutzner) composed in 1782, is Joseph Haydn's eighth setting of the Ordinary of the Mass. The title translates (lit. 'Mass for Zell', where "Zell" stands for Mariazell) and is often identified by the German name Mariazeller Messe. It was commissioned by the officer Anton Liebe von Kreutzner on the occasion of his ennoblement.

As well as Haydn's other Missa Cellensis in honorem Beatissimae Virginis Mariae Hob. XXII:5, written in 1766 and also known as Cäcilien-Messe (St. Cecilia Mass), the mass was composed for performance at the Mariazell pilgrimage church in Styria.

== Structure ==
Compared to Haydn's late masses, the structure of Hob. XXII:8 is rather traditional: fugues at the ends of the Gloria, Credo and Agnus Dei, solo passages in the Gloria and Credo, and a soloistic Benedictus. On the other hand, Haydn included many innovations, such as the slow symphonic introduction at the beginning of the Kyrie, where the setting is built on the low voices of the choir and orchestra. The fugues are very rhythmic and syncopated, the solo passages appear very theatrical. This Mass may therefore be considered a link between Haydn's early and late masses.

Scoring:

- Soloists (SATB)
- Choir (SATB)
- 2 oboes, bassoons, 2 trumpets, timpani, violins I and II, viola, cello, double bass, organ

Sections:

1. Kyrie eleison, Adagio, C major, common time
  Kyrie, Vivace, C major, 3/4
2. Gloria, Allegro con spirito, C major, common time
  Gratias agimus tibi, Allegro, F major, 3/8
  Qui tollis peccata mundi, Allegro, F minor, 3/8
  Quoniam tu solus sanctus, Allegro con brio, C major, common time
3. Credo, Vivace, C major, 3/4
  Et incarnatus est, Largo, A minor – C minor, common time
  Et resurrexit, Vivace, C major, 3/4
  Et vitam venturi, Vivace, C major, 6/8
4. Sanctus, Adagio, C major, 3/4
  Pleni sunt coeli, Allegro, Allegro, C major, 3/4
5. Benedictus, Allegretto, G minor, 2/4
  Hosanna, Allegro, Allegro, C major, 3/4
6. Agnus Dei, Adagio, C minor, common time
  Dona nobis pacem, Vivace, C major, common time

A typical performance lasts ca. 45 minutes.

== Sources ==
- Susanne Kraft-Blachny: Missa Cellensis [C-Dur] Fatta per il Signor Liebe de Kreutzner, »Mariazeller Messe« Komponiert für Herrn Liebe de Kreutzner Hob. XXII:8. In: Silke Leopold, Ullrich Scheideler: Oratorienführer. Metzler, Stuttgart 2000, ISBN 3-476-00977-7, S. 319 f.
