= Alan Titus =

American baritone

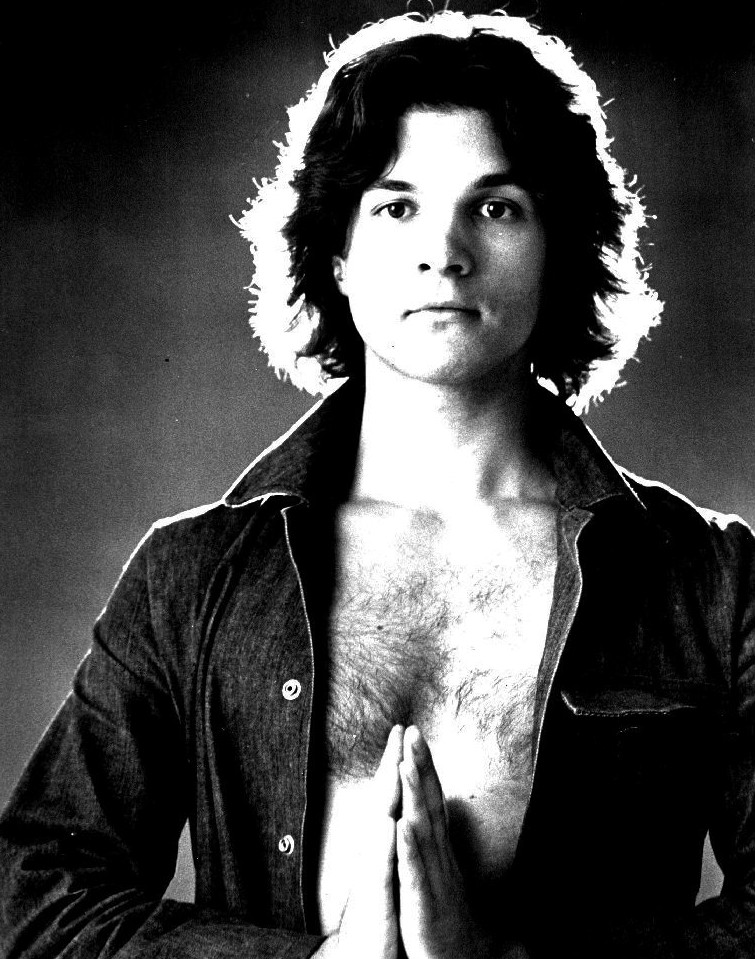
Alan Titus in 1971.

Alan Titus (born in New York City, on October 28, 1945) is an internationally celebrated baritone.

== Life and career ==
Titus studied under Aksel Schiøtz at the Colorado School of Music, and Hans Heinz at The Juilliard School. His official debut was as Marcello in La bohème in Washington, D.C., in 1969. He came to prominence, however, in Leonard Bernstein's theatre piece MASS, creating the role of the Celebrant. MASS was commissioned by former First Lady Jacqueline Kennedy for the September 1971 opening of the Kennedy Center in Washington, D.C.

Titus created the role of Archie Kramer in Lee Hoiby's Summer and Smoke (after Tennessee Williams) in St. Paul in 1971, and repeated the role in his New York City Opera debut that same year. He found a home at the New York City Opera, where he was a leading baritone for many seasons. He participated in nationally televised performances of Il barbiere di Siviglia (with Beverly Sills, 1976), The Merry Widow also with Sills in 1977, Il turco in Italia (1978), La Cenerentola (opposite Susanne Marsee and Rockwell Blake, 1980), and Madama Butterfly (conducted by Christopher Keene, 1982). He made his only appearances with the Metropolitan Opera in 1976, as Harlekin in Ariadne auf Naxos, with Montserrat Caballé.

In 1974, the baritone appeared in the world premiere of Hans Werner Henze's Rachel, la cubana, for WNET Opera Theatre, opposite Lee Venora and Marsee, conducted by the composer.

In 1973, Titus made his European debut, in Amsterdam, as Pelléas in Debussy's Pelléas et Mélisande. He has since been heard at Glyndebourne, Munich, Milan, Madrid, Barcelona, Vienna, Paris, Rome, London (Covent Garden), Berlin, etc.

At the Teatro alla Scala, the baritone appeared in Arabella (1992), Elektra (directed by Luca Ronconi, 1994), La fanciulla del West (1995), Die Frau ohne Schatten (in Jean-Pierre Ponnelle's production, 1999), and Salome (2002).

He made his Bayreuth Festival debut in 1998, in the title role in Der fliegende Holländer and repeated the role in 1999. At Bayreuth in 2000, he portrayed Wotan in Das Rheingold and Die Walküre and The Wanderer in Siegfried; and repeated all three roles in 2001, 2002, 2003 and 2004. He portrayed Wotan at the Teatro Real de Madrid in 2003. He returned to Bayreuth in 2009 to portray Hans Sachs/Schuster in Die Meistersinger von Nürnberg.

In 1994, the singing-actor was awarded the title of Kammersänger, in Munich.

In his discography are recordings of Beethoven's Fidelio (as Don Pizarro) and Ninth Symphony (conducted by Giuseppe Sinopoli), Bizet's Carmen, Catalani's La Wally (as Gellner), Donizetti's Don Pasquale (with Sills, conducted by Sarah Caldwell), Haydn's La fedeltà premiata (conducted by Antal Doráti), Lehár's Die lustige Witwe (excerpts, in English, under Julius Rudel), Leoncavallo's La bohème, Mozart's Don Giovanni (led by Rafael Kubelík) and Le nozze di Figaro (as Figaro, conducted by Sir Colin Davis), Puccini's La bohème (led by Kent Nagano), and Verdi's Falstaff (as Ford, with Sir Colin Davis).

Titus retired in 2010, following a forty-year career.

== See also ==
- Haydn: La fedeltà premiata (Antal Doráti recording)

== Bibliography ==
- The Metropolitan Opera Encyclopedia, edited by David Hamilton, Simon and Schuster, 1987. ISBN 0-671-61732-X
