= Arleen Auger =

American coloratura soprano (1939-1993)

- Born: September 13, 1939; South Gate, California, U.S.
- Died: June 10, 1993 (aged 53); Leusden, the Netherlands
- Resting place: Ferncliff Cemetery; Hartsdale, New York
- Education: California State University
- Occupation: Soprano singer
- Years active: 1967–1992

Joyce Arleen Auger (sometimes spelled Augér /oʊˈʒeɪ/; September 13, 1939 – June 10, 1993) was an American coloratura soprano, known for her interpretations of works by Bach, Handel, Haydn, Monteverdi, Mozart, and Schubert. She won a posthumous Grammy Award for "Best Classical Vocal Performance" in 1994.

== Early life and education ==
Auger was born in South Gate, California and grew up in Huntington Beach. Her father, Everett Auger, was a noted minister who emigrated from Canada with his wife Doris (née Moody).

As a child, Auger studied voice, violin and piano.

She received a BA in Education from California State University at Long Beach in 1963. Her first job was as a kindergarten and first grade teacher.

Between 1965 and 1967, she studied voice with tenor Ralph Errolle in South Pasadena, California. She continued work as a teacher and took on church and synagogue singing jobs on weekends.

== Career ==
Auger made her professional debut with the Los Angeles Philharmonic.

In 1967, Auger was teaching first grade in Los Angeles when she won the I. Victor Fuchs Competition. The prize included a trip to Vienna to audition for the Volksoper. She auditioned with Queen of the Night arias from Mozart's The Magic Flute and Olympia's aria from Offenbach's The Tales of Hoffmann.

Auger was signed by the Vienna State Opera and made her debut as the Queen of the Night in Mozart's The Magic Flute conducted by Josef Krips. She remained with the company for seven years. She took part in a broadcast from Cologne of The Pirates of Penzance (as Mabel) at Whitsun 1972. Auger returned to America in 1969 to perform in the New York City Opera.

In 1974, Auger left the Vienna State Opera to pursue her career in concert and devote more time to teaching at the Salzburg Mozarteum, where she was a professor in the early-1970s. Among her pupils was soprano Renée Fleming, whom she met while studying as a Fulbright scholar in Germany.

In the late-1970s Auger was based in Frankfurt, where she was a professor of song at the University of Frankfurt. She continued to sing recitals, in oratorios, and in opera.

She made her Metropolitan Opera debut in 1978 as Marzelline in Fidelio under Karl Böhm. In 1980, she was offered Konstanze in Mozart's Die Entführung aus dem Serail at the Met but did not sing it.

Auger travelled to Japan in the mid-1970s with Helmuth Rilling to perform as a soloist in Bach's St Matthew Passion. They went on to make over 40 recordings together. Her debut at La Scala was in 1975 in L'enfant et les sortilèges. From this time, she turned to lyrical roles in opera, preferring concert singing in early music, as well as lieder, often accompanied by pianist Irwin Gage. She performed most of the soprano parts in Helmuth Rilling's Bach cantata cycle of the mid-1970s to mid-1980s, with several appearances at Rilling's Oregon Bach Festival. She also commissioned new song cycles by Libby Larsen (Sonnets from the Portuguese) and Judith Lang Zaimont. Auger’s association with Rilling led to her first break in the United States when Blanche Moyse, director of the New England Bach Festival, heard her sing with Rilling at the Oregon Bach Festival in 1980 and signed her for a series of concerts the following season.

Auger sang the Alleluia from Mozart's Exsultate, jubilate at the wedding of Prince Andrew and Sarah Ferguson in 1986 during the signing of the register.

She recorded the Exsultate, jubilate along with the Great Mass in C minor under Leonard Bernstein in 1990. In May 1991, Auger triumphed as a featured soloist with the Bach Choir of Bethlehem, performing the Mass in B minor, Sheep may safely graze, and other works at the Choir's annual Festival. On December 5, 1991, the bicentenary of Mozart's death, she sang his Requiem with Cecilia Bartoli, Vinson Cole, René Pape, and the Vienna Philharmonic conducted by Georg Solti in St. Stephen's Cathedral, Vienna.

In 1993, she won a Grammy Award for "Best Classical Vocal Performance" for her recording titled The Art of Arleen Auger (Works Of Larsen, Purcell, Schumann, Mozart). It was her fourth nomination and first win.

== Death ==
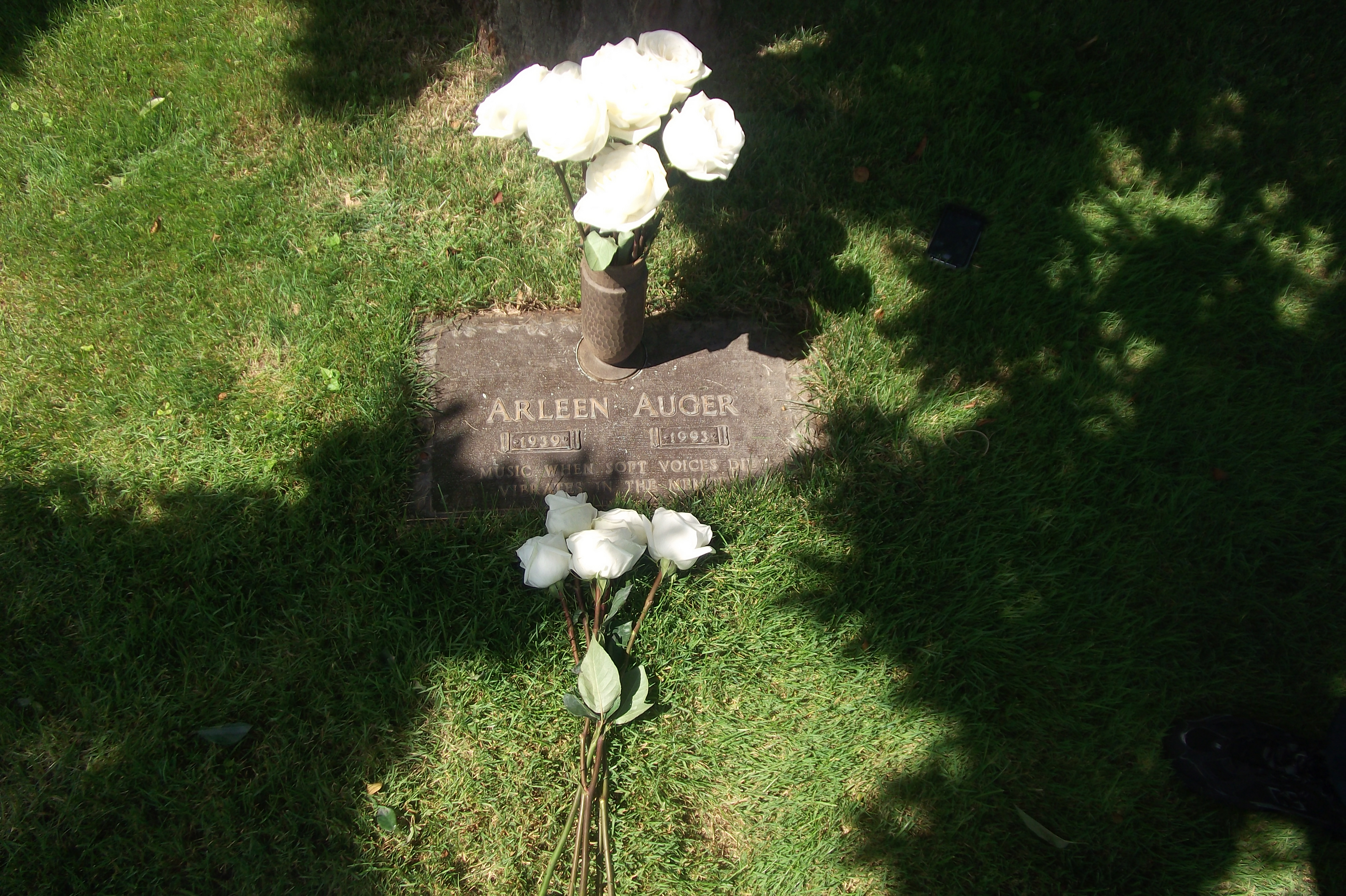
Arleen Auger's grave at Ferncliff Cemetery

Auger retired in February 1992, after being diagnosed with a malignant brain tumor in the right parietal lobe of her brain. The mass was determined to be a giant cell glioblastoma. She underwent three brain surgeries, flying to the U.S. to receive medical attention at Mount Sinai Hospital in New York City. After the last surgery, Auger returned to Leusden where she fell into a deep coma and died in hospital on June 10, 1993 at the age of 53.

Following her death, a memorial service was held at the Frank E. Campbell Funeral Chapel where works by Bach, Mozart, Fauré and others were performed by well-known musicians, including Renée Fleming and Karen Holvik.

She was buried at Ferncliff Cemetery in Hartsdale, New York.

== Personal ==
Auger was married and divorced twice. She had one brother, Ralph Auger.

Auger was married to a German historian from 1970 to 1986.

In Europe, her husband was her manager during their 16-year marriage. In the United States, she had a contract with Columbia Artists Management until 1978. In 1981, she signed with the International Management Group, which also represented Itzhak Perlman.

== Recordings ==
Auger made nearly 200 recordings throughout her career, ranging from works by Bach, Mozart and Handel to offbeat opera and song projects. Many of her recordings received global recognition, including the Grand Prix du Disque, the Edison Prize, and the Deutscher Schallplattenpreis.

Her discography includes the Four Last Songs of Richard Strauss, recorded with Andre Previn and the Vienna Philharmonic (Telarc CD-80180; CD only). Her portrayal of the Countess in Mozart's opera Le Nozze di Figaro with the Drottningholm Court Theater Orchestra and Chorus conducted by Arnold Oestman is widely admired, as is her recording of Handel's Alcina with the City of London Sinfonia led by Richard Hickox.

In March 1990, Auger recorded Haydn's Creation for EMI with Simon Rattle and the City of Birmingham Symphony Orchestra. She also registered an EMI album with Rattle and his orchestra of Mahler's Symphony No. 2 (EMI CDCB 47962; CD only) and Berg's Lulu Suite (EMI CDC 49857; CD only). Auger sang the lead role in a Virgin Classics recording of Monteverdi's work L'Incoronazione di Poppea, as well as Schubert's songs with fortepianist Lambert Orkis. Current issues on Virgin include Canteloube's Songs of the Auvergne with Yan Pascal Tortelier conducting the English Chamber Orchestra (VC 7 90714-2; CD and cassette).

Later that year, a disk with her work was released in London, including Haydn arias with Christopher Hogwood and the Handel & Haydn Society, Mozart's C minor Mass with Hogwood and the Academy of Ancient Music, and Don Giovanni with the Oestman-Drottningholm forces in the role of Donna Anna.

For Deutsche Grammophon, Auger recorded Handel's Messiah with Trevor Pinnock and the English Concert (Archiv 423 630-2 AH; all three formats), the Dixit Dominus of Handel with Simon Preston and the Westminster Abbey Chorus and Orchestra (Archiv 423 594-2 AH; CD only), and Mozart's Exsultate, Jubilate, Coronation Mass and Vespers with Leonard Bernstein and the Bavarian Radio Symphony Orchestra.

== Discography ==
- Il mondo della luna (Antal Doráti recording)
- Great Mass in C minor, K. 427 (film)
- Handel: Alcina title role, with Della Jones (Ruggiero), Kathleen Kuhlmann (Bradamante), Maldwyn Davies (Oronte), Eiddwen Harrhy (Morgana), Patrizia Kwella (Oberto), John Tomlinson, the City of London Baroque Sinfonia, conducted by Richard Hickox, Warner Classics.

== See also ==
- List of notable brain tumor patients
