= Lucia Valentini Terrani =

Italian opera singer

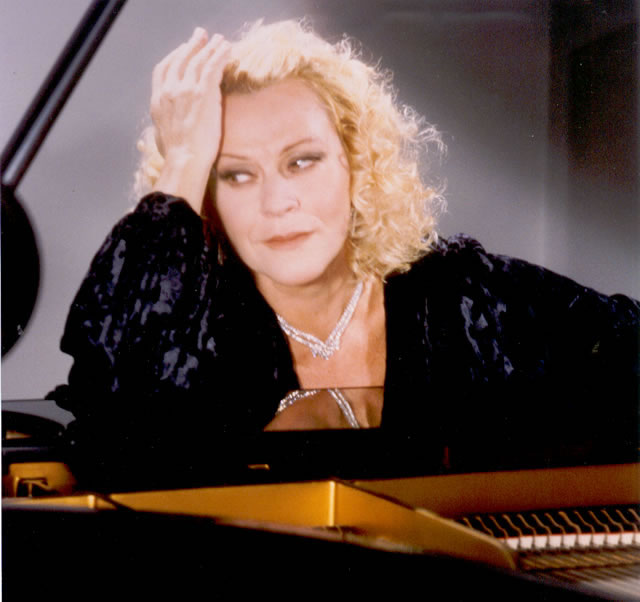
Lucia Valentini Terrani

Lucia Valentini Terrani (29 August 1946 in Padua – 11 June 1998 in Seattle) was an Italian coloratura mezzo-soprano, particularly associated with Rossini roles.

== Life and career ==
Born Lucia Valentini, she studied first at the Padua Music Conservatory, and later at the Conservatorio di Musica Benedetto Marcello in Venice. She made her stage debut in Brescia, as Angelina in La cenerentola, a role with which she would remain closely associated throughout her career. She made her debut at La Scala in 1973, again as Angelina, and quickly established herself in the Rossini repertoire, singing in L'italiana in Algeri, Il barbiere di Siviglia, Il viaggio a Reims. She also sang the many "trouser roles" such as Tancredi, Malcolm in La donna del lago, Pippo in La gazza ladra, Calbo in Maometto secondo, Arsace in Semiramide, Isolier in Le comte Ory, etc. She also sang a few roles of the baroque repertory, notably Medea in Cavalli's Giasone, Dido in Purcell's Dido and Aeneas, Alcina in Vivaldi's Orlando furioso, and Bradamante in Handel's Alcina. However, she did not restrict herself to the belcanto and expanded her repertoire to include roles such as Eboli, Quickly, Mignon, Carmen, Charlotte, Dulcinée, Marina and Jocasta.

She enjoyed a very successful international career, appearing in Paris, Moscow, Buenos Aires, Chicago, Los Angeles, Washington, etc. She made her Metropolitan Opera debut in 1974, as Isabella L'italiana in Algeri, and in 1976 she "caused a furore" at Covent Garden performing La cenerentola with the La Scala company.

Valentini married Italian actor Alberto Terrani, pseudonym of Alfredo Bolognesi, in 1973, and added his stage surname to hers. She was diagnosed with leukemia in 1996, and went to the famous Fred Hutchinson Cancer Research Center in Seattle for treatment, where her colleague and friend José Carreras had been treated for the same affliction. In 1998, she died of complications following a bone marrow transplant at the age of 51.

Critics described her voice as rich and agile, and noted her musicianship and stage presence.

Her recordings include L'italiana in Algeri (1978), La cenerentola (1980), Nabucco (1982), Falstaff (with Renato Bruson, conducted by Carlo Maria Giulini, 1982), and Don Carlos (opposite Plácido Domingo, Katia Ricciarelli and Ruggero Raimondi, conducted by Claudio Abbado, 1983–84).

A small square close to the Teatro Verdi in Padua, the city of her birth, has been named Piazzetta Lucia Valentini Terrani in her honour. Also named for her is a hotel in Padua especially designed for the families of sick people being treated at local hospitals, where they can stay at reduced rates.

== See also ==
- Haydn: La fedeltà premiata (Antal Doráti recording)
- Haydn: Il mondo della luna (Antal Doráti recording)

== Sources ==
- Le guide de l'opéra, les indispensables de la musique, R. Mancin & J-J. Rouvereux, (Fayard, 1986), ISBN 2-213-01563-5
- Opera News, Obituaries, August 1998
