= Domenico Trimarchi =

Domenico Trimarchi is an Italian bass-baritone opera singer. He was born in Naples (21 December 1938), where he studied singing at the Naples Conservatory. In 1970, he made his debut at La Fenice, Venice as Belcore in L'elisir d'amore. He made his British debut at the Edinburgh Festival in 1972 and first appeared at Covent Garden in 1975 playing Dr. Bartolo in The Barber of Seville. In The Times William Mann praised him as "ripe, rubber-faced and a virtuoso patter singer." Trimarchi reprised the role there between 1978 and 1987. He has appeared at all the major opera-houses of the world, including La Scala, Milan, the Vienna State Opera and the Metropolitan Opera in New York.

== See also ==
- Haydn: Il mondo della luna (Antal Doráti recording)
