= Antal Doráti =

Hungarian-born conductor and composer

Antal Doráti (1959)

Antal Doráti (UK: /ˌæntæl dɔːˈrɑːti/, US: /ˈdɔːrɑːti, dɔːˈrɑːti/, Hungarian: [ˈɒntɒl ˈdoraːti]; 9 April 1906 – 13 November 1988) was a Hungarian-born conductor and composer who became a naturalized American citizen in 1943.

== Biography ==
Antal Doráti was born in Budapest to a Jewish family. His father Alexander Doráti was a violinist with the Budapest Philharmonic Orchestra and his mother Margit Kunwald was a piano teacher.

He studied at the Franz Liszt Academy with Zoltán Kodály and Leó Weiner for composition and Béla Bartók for piano. His links with Bartók continued for many years: he conducted the world premiere of Bartók's Viola Concerto, as completed by Tibor Serly, with the Minneapolis Symphony Orchestra in 1949, with William Primrose as the soloist.

He made his conducting debut in 1924 with the Budapest Royal Opera.

As well as composing original works, he compiled and arranged pieces by Johann Strauss II for the ballet Graduation Ball (1940), premiered by the Original Ballet Russe in Sydney, Australia, with himself on the conductor's podium. For Ballet Theatre (later renamed American Ballet Theatre) he created scores for the ballets Bluebeard (1941) from music by Jacques Offenbach and The Fair at Sorochinsk (1943) from music by Modest Mussorgsky.

After becoming a naturalized American citizen in 1943, Doráti held several positions during his first years in the United States; the New York Ballet Theater (1941–45), the Dallas Symphony Orchestra (1945–48) and the Minneapolis Symphony Orchestra (1949–60). He returned to the US in 1970 after a decade in Europe as conductor of the BBC Symphony Orchestra and Stockholm Philharmonic and lead seven seasons with the National Symphony Orchestra (with whom he would make a handful of recordings).

Doráti's first experience with the Detroit Symphony Orchestra was in December 1953, when the orchestra was under the permanent direction of Paul Paray and held a recording contract with the American label Mercury Living Presence, which were considerably commercially successful. Doráti returned to conduct the Detroit Symphony Orchestra on two separate occasions in 1971 and 1975, before finally appearing in 1977 as the orchestra's new musical director.

His autobiography, Notes of Seven Decades, was published in 1979.

In 1983, Doráti was appointed an honorary Knight Commander of the Order of the British Empire (KBE).

His wife was Ilse von Alpenheim, an Austrian pianist.

Doráti died at the age of 82 in Gerzensee, Switzerland.

== Career ==
Doráti held posts as principal conductor of the following orchestras:

- Ballet Russe, music director (1937–1941).
- Ballet Theatre orchestra, New York (1941–1945).
- Dallas Symphony Orchestra (1945–1948)
- Minneapolis Symphony Orchestra (1949–1960)
- BBC Symphony Orchestra (1963–1966), which bid him a fond farewell playing his Symphony in Five Movements and his Madrigal Suite.
- Stockholm Philharmonic Orchestra (1966–74), with which he recorded his Symphony No. 1 and his Symphony No. 2, "Querela Pacis" on the BIS label. He took that orchestra on its first international tours.
- National Symphony Orchestra in Washington, D.C. (1970–1977), which he rescued from bankruptcy and a players' strike.
- Royal Philharmonic Orchestra (1975–1979)
- Detroit Symphony Orchestra (1977–1981)

== Recordings ==
He made his first recording with the London Philharmonic Orchestra for the recording label His Master's Voice. This was later transferred to RCA Records with whom HMV were for some time associated. Over the course of his career Doráti made over 600 recordings.

With the Philharmonia Hungarica, Doráti was the second conductor to record the complete symphonies of Joseph Haydn (the first complete recorded edition was conducted by Ernst Märzendorfer and the Vienna Chamber Orchestra, but it had a very limited release). He also recorded an unprecedented cycle of Joseph Haydn's operas and Ottorino Respighi's Ancient Airs and Dances, Suites 1, 2 and 3.

Doráti became especially well known for his recordings of Tchaikovsky's music. He was the first conductor to record all three of Tchaikovsky's ballets – Swan Lake, The Sleeping Beauty and The Nutcracker – complete. The albums were recorded in mono in 1954 and 1955, for Mercury Records released on CD by The Doráti Society, with the Minneapolis Symphony Orchestra (later renamed the Minnesota Orchestra), as part of their famous "Living Presence" series. All three ballets were at first issued separately, but were later re-issued in a 6-LP set. Dorati did re-record Swan Lake [released on CD by Universal Mercury], but he made a stereo recording of The Sleeping Beauty (complete) with the Royal Concertgebouw Orchestra of Amsterdam for Philips Classics Records, and two complete recordings in stereo of The Nutcracker, one with the London Symphony Orchestra (again for Mercury), and the other with the Concertgebouw Orchestra for Philips – all this within a span of about twenty-seven years. He also recorded all four of Tchaikovsky's orchestral suites with the New Philharmonia Orchestra, and he was the first conductor to make a recording of Tchaikovsky's "1812" Overture (featuring the Minneapolis Symphony Orchestra) with real cannons, brass band, and church bells, first in mono in 1954 and then in stereo in 1958. Both the mono and stereo "1812" versions reached No. 3 in the United States and sold over one million copies, with that they were awarded a gold disc by the RIAA. He also recorded all six of Tchaikovsky's symphonies with the London Symphony Orchestra.

His 1961 album titled Beethoven: Wellington's Victory reached No. 20 in the US.

Other prominent composers in Doráti's recording career were Béla Bartók and Igor Stravinsky. His comprehensive series of Bartók's orchestral works for Mercury have been brought together on a 5-CD set.

He also made the first stereo recording of Léo Delibes' Coppélia, with the Minneapolis Symphony Orchestra. An album set of Wagner's Der fliegende Holländer is also among Doráti's popular recordings.

In 1969, he made the world premiere recording of Sibelius's tone poem Luonnotar, with Gwyneth Jones as soprano soloist. In 1973 he conducted the world premiere recording of Max Bruch's Concerto for Two Pianos and Orchestra, which was written in 1912 but only rediscovered in 1971.

In 1969, with the Stockholm Philharmonic Dorati conducted the first recording of the Symphony No. 7 of Swedish composer Allan Pettersson, of which he was the dedicatee.

He made digital recordings, for English Decca Records (released in the U.S. on the London label), with the Detroit Symphony Orchestra and the Royal Philharmonic Orchestra and the Royal Concertgebouw Orchestra for Philips. One of these, the recording of Stravinsky's The Rite of Spring with the Detroit Symphony Orchestra, received the coveted French award Grand Prix du Disque.

== See also ==
- List of honorary British knights and dames
- Haydn: La fedeltà premiata (Antal Doráti recording)
- Haydn: Il mondo della luna (Antal Doráti recording)

Cultural offices
Preceded by Dimitri Mitropoulos	Music Director, Minneapolis Symphony Orchestra; 1949–1960	Succeeded by Stanisław Skrowaczewski
Preceded by Hans Schmidt-Isserstedt	Principal Conductor, Royal Stockholm Philharmonic Orchestra; 1966–1974	Succeeded by Gennady Rozhdestvensky
