= Great Mass in C minor, K. 427 (film) =

- Deutsche Grammophon DVD, 00440-073-4240
- Also known as: Mozart: Grosse Messe c-moll KV 427
- Genre: Sacred music
- Directed by: Humphrey Burton
- Starring: Arleen Auger, Cornelius Hauptmann, Frank Lopardo, Frederica von Stade, Leonard Bernstein
- Country of origin: Germany
- Original language: Latin

Production
- Executive producers: Horant H. Hohlfeld, Harry Kraut, Korbinian Meyer
- Cinematography: Robert Scholl, Ilias Petropoulos
- Editor: Inge Marschner
- Running time: 86 minutes
- Production companies: Bayerischer Rundfunk, Unitel

Original release
- Network: Bayerischer Rundfunk
- Release: 1991

Mozart: Grosse Messe c-moll KV 427 is an 86-minute live video album of Wolfgang Amadeus Mozart's Christian vocal works Great Mass in C minor, Ave verum corpus and Exsultate, jubilate, performed by Arleen Auger, Cornelius Hauptmann, Frank Lopardo, Frederica von Stade, the Bavarian Radio Symphony Chorus and the Bavarian Radio Symphony Orchestra under the direction of Leonard Bernstein. Deutsche Grammophon issued it on VHS video cassette, Laserdisc and DVD, and also released audio cassette and CD versions of its soundtrack.

== Background and production ==
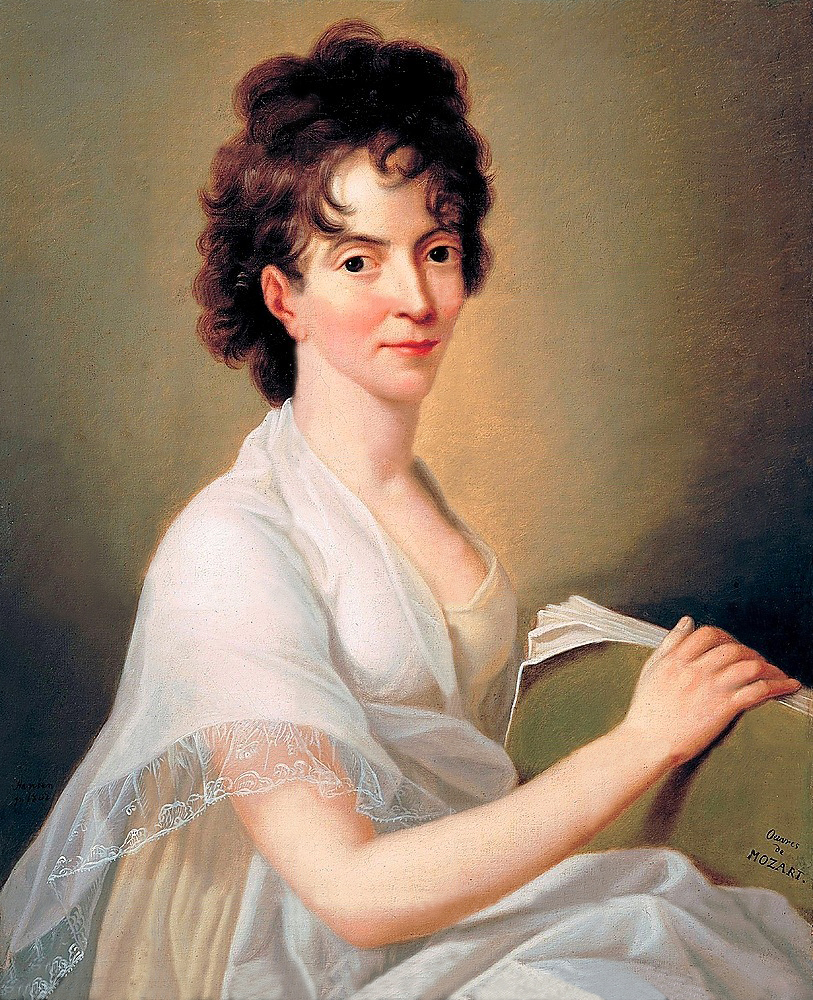
Constanze Mozart, for whom the Great Mass was composed, portrayed by Hans Hansen in 1802

In October 1772, aged sixteen, Mozart made his third visit to Italy, accompanied by his father Leopold. The most important work that he composed there was his opera seria Lucio Silla, premiered in Milan's Teatro Regio Ducale on 26 December as part of the city's carnival festivities. Mozart was so impressed by Venanzio Rauzzini's performance as Cecilio that he was inspired to compose a motet specially for the castrato as a showcase for his virtuosity. Rauzzini premiered Exsultate, jubilate in Milan's Theatine Church on 17 January 1773.

The author of the text of the motet has not been identified. The architecture of its music suggests that it was modelled on Neapolitan symphonies and concertos, and its brilliant coloratura vocal writing is reminiscent of contemporary Italian opera. (Among the composers whom critics have cited as influences on the work are Johann Adolph Hasse, Niccolò Jommelli and Antonio Sacchini.) It opens with an allegro movement ("Exsultate, jubilate"), proceeding via a brief recitativo secco ("Fulget amica dies") to an andante aria addressed to the Blessed Virgin Mary ("Tu virginum corona") and a climactic molto allegro "Alleluja".

The Great Mass in C minor originated not in a commission from the Church but from an affair of the heart. Living in Vienna in 1782, Mozart was engaged to a singer, Constanze Weber, who had fallen ill. He vowed in July that if she recovered, if their marriage plans were fulfilled and if he was able to introduce her to his father and sister in Salzburg, he would compose a Mass as an expression of gratitude. Constanze did indeed get better, and the couple were married on 4 August: Mozart began work on his Mass shortly afterwards. A letter that he wrote to Leopold on 4 January 1783 reported that the work was half finished and that he had every hope of completing it. In the event, he seems to have set it aside in May, taking the "Credo" only as far as its "Et incarnatus est" and writing no music for the "Agnus Dei".

Mozart and his wife travelled to Salzburg as they had hoped, arriving no later than 29 July. His sister Nannerl recorded in her diary that Constanze was the soprano soloist and Mozart the conductor when the Mass received its first performance in St Peter's Abbey on 26 October. (It is conjectured that its omissions may have been repaired with borrowings from the other Mass settings that Mozart had composed while in the service of Hieronymus von Colloredo, Salzburg's Prince-Archbishop). Some musicologists think that the ambition of the Mass's music was in part the consequence of Mozart's encountering the baroque masterpieces of Johann Sebastian Bach and George Frideric Handel in private concerts given by Baron Gottfried van Swieten.

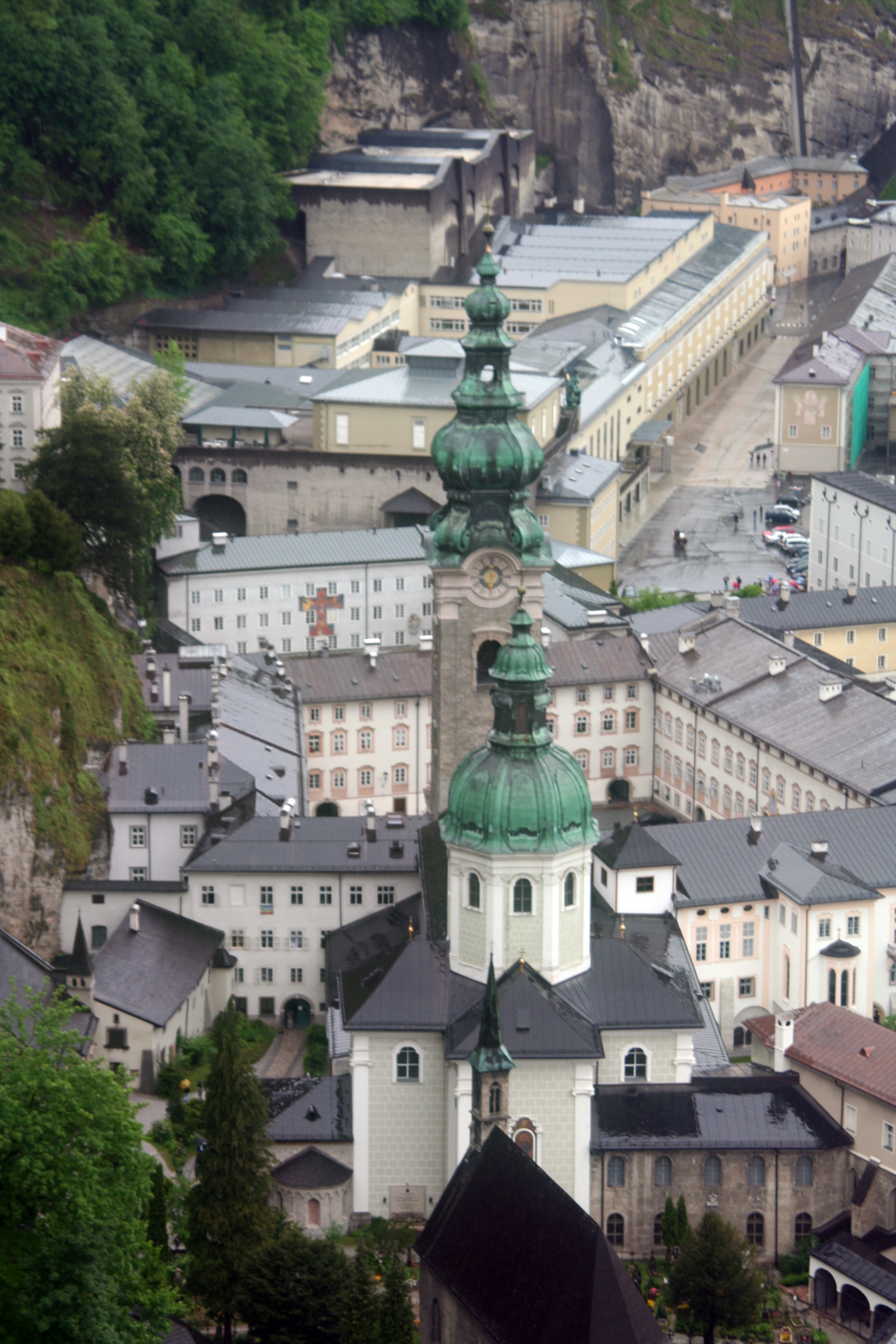
Salzburg's St Peter's Abbey, where the Great Mass was first performed

Much of Mozart's original autograph of the Mass has been lost. Modern editions rely largely on a copy dating from the 1830s. Leonard Bernstein's album uses a performing score devised by Franz Beyer in 1989, which fills Mozart's lacunae with modest pastiches of his string writing but resists the temptation to embellish the music's texture with organ, brass or percussion parts.

In June 1791, the year of his death, Mozart was engrossed in his collaboration with Emanuel Schikaneder on their Singspiel Die Zauberflöte. But he found time to travel from Vienna to join his wife in a holiday in the spa town of Baden bei Wien. Meeting Anton Stoll, an old friend who worked as a teacher and choirmaster, Mozart was prompted to compose a setting of the text Ave verum corpus, a verse excerpted from the anonymous 14th-century sequence In honorem SS. Sacramenti. The work was completed on 17 June, and was probably first performed on the feast of Corpus Christi, which in 1791 occurred six days later. The motet was the last piece of Christian music that Mozart completed.

Leonard Bernstein's film of these three works – including his first ever performance of the Mass – was recorded in concerts and retake sessions on 4 and 5 April 1990 in the Stiftsbasilika in Waldsassen. Attached to a Cistercian abbey and consecrated in 1704, the basilica was chosen as a filming location because of its acoustics, its tranquillity and the beauty of its rococo design, and also for reasons of philosophy. Waldsassen is near the border between the German state of Bavaria and the Czech Republic, and has been claimed to be close to the centre of the European continent. Making his album less than a year after the fall of the Berlin Wall, Bernstein regarded the town as an ideal place in which to perform music that he hoped would help Europe to make the transition from division and conflict to unity and peace.

While working on his film, Bernstein was visibly distressed by pain brought about by his mesothelioma (lung cancer). He died after a cardiac infarction (heart attack) in New York City on 14 October 1990. Arleen Auger died from the effects of glioblastoma (brain cancer) on 10 June 1993.

== DVD chapter listing ==
Wolfgang Amadeus Mozart (1756-1791)

- 1 (1:05) Opening credits, over footage of Waldsassen

Ave verum corpus ("Hail, true body", Motet for chorus and orchestra, K. 618, Baden bei Wien, 1791), with an anonymous text from the 14th century

- 2 (4:34) Ave verum corpus (Adagio, chorus)

Exsultate, jubilate ("Rejoice, shout", Motet for soprano and orchestra, K. 165/158a, Milan, 1773), with an anonymous text

- 3 (5:10) Exsultate, jubilate (Allegro)
- 4 (0:52) Fulget amica dies (Allegro)
- 5 (6:14) Tu virginum corona (Andante)
- 6 (2:49) Alleluja (Molto allegro)

Grosse Messe c moll ("Great Mass in C minor", Tridentine Missa solemnis [solemn Mass] for two sopranos, tenor, bass, chorus and orchestra, K. 427/417a, Salzburg, 1783), reconstructed by Franz Beyer (1922–2018), with a text codified at the Council of Trent between 1545 and 1563 and promulgated by Pope Pius V (1504-1572) in 1570

- 7 (0:35) Opening credits

Kyrie

- 8 (7:57) Kyrie (Andante moderato, soprano, chorus)

Gloria

- 9 (2:20) Gloria in excelsis Deo (Allegro vivace, chorus)
- 10 (5:09) Laudamus te (Allegro aperto, mezzo-soprano)
- 11 (1:38) Gratias agimus tibi (Adagio, soprano, mezzo-soprano, tenor, bass)
- 12 (2:47) Domine Deus (Allegro moderato, soprano, mezzo-soprano)
- 13 (5:43) Qui tollis peccata mundi (Largo, double chorus)
- 14 (4:36) Quoniam tu solus Sanctus (Allegro, soprano, mezzo-soprano, tenor)
- 15 (5:12) Jesu Christe (Adagio) / Cum Sancto Spiritu (soprano, mezzo-soprano, tenor, bass)

Credo

- 16 (4:18) Credo in unum Deum ( Allegro maestoso, chorus)
- 17 (8:39) Et incarnatus est (Andante, soprano)

Sanctus

- 18 (1:42) Sanctus (Largo, double chorus)
- 19 (1:41) Osanna in excelsis (Allegro comodo, chorus)
- 20 (6:47) Benedictus qui venit (Allegro comodo, soprano, mezzo-soprano, tenor, bass, double chorus)

Bonus feature

- 21 (7:15) A reflection by Leonard Bernstein on Mozart, Waldsassen, war and peace, spoken in German

== Personnel ==
=== Musicians ===
- Arleen Auger (1939–1993), soprano
- Frederica von Stade (b. 1945), mezzo-soprano
- Frank Lopardo (b. 1957), tenor
- Cornelius Hauptmann (b. 1951), bass
- Friedemann Winklhofer, organ
- Bavarian Radio Chorus
- Wolfgang Seeliger (b. 1946), chorus master
- Bavarian Radio Symphony Orchestra
- Leonard Bernstein (1918–1990), conductor

=== Television personnel ===
- Horant H. Hohlfeld, executive producer
- Harry Kraut, executive producer
- Korbinian Meyer, executive producer
- Humphrey Burton (1931—2025), director
- Monika Fröhlich, assistant director
- Rudolf Hegen, production manager
- Peter Althaus, unit manager
- Irene Götz, unit manager
- Werner Islinger, lighting
- Robert Scholl, director of photography
- Ilias Petropoulos, director of photography
- Eckard Kaemmerer, lead camera operator
- Michael Bumm, camera operator
- Jochen Kindler, camera operator
- Peter Klima, camera operator
- Axel Reuter, camera operator
- Detlef Rittig, camera operator
- Hagen Volkmann, camera operator
- Inge Marschner, film editor
- Gernot R. Westäuser, sound recording
- Josef Wanninger, sound recording
- Andreas Stange, sound recording
- Ursula Helmer, videotape editor
- Josef Krause, set construction
- Udo Riemer, make-up
- Eva Uhl, make-up

=== DVD production personnel ===
- Roland Ott, producer and project manager
- Burkhard Bartsch, project coordinator
- Harald Gericke, producer
- Tatjana Njofang, screen design
- Tatyana Udina, screen design
- Daniel Schleef, authoring
- Julian Wijnmaalen, authoring
- Thomas Völpel, AMSI II mastering
- Raymond Law, subtitles
- Eva Reisinger, booklet editor
- Nikolaus Boddin, booklet art director

=== CD production personnel ===
- Alison Ames, executive producer
- Hans Weber, recording producer
- Hans-Peter Schweigmann, balance engineer
- Andrew Wedman, editor
- Lutz Bode, booklet art director

== Critical reception ==
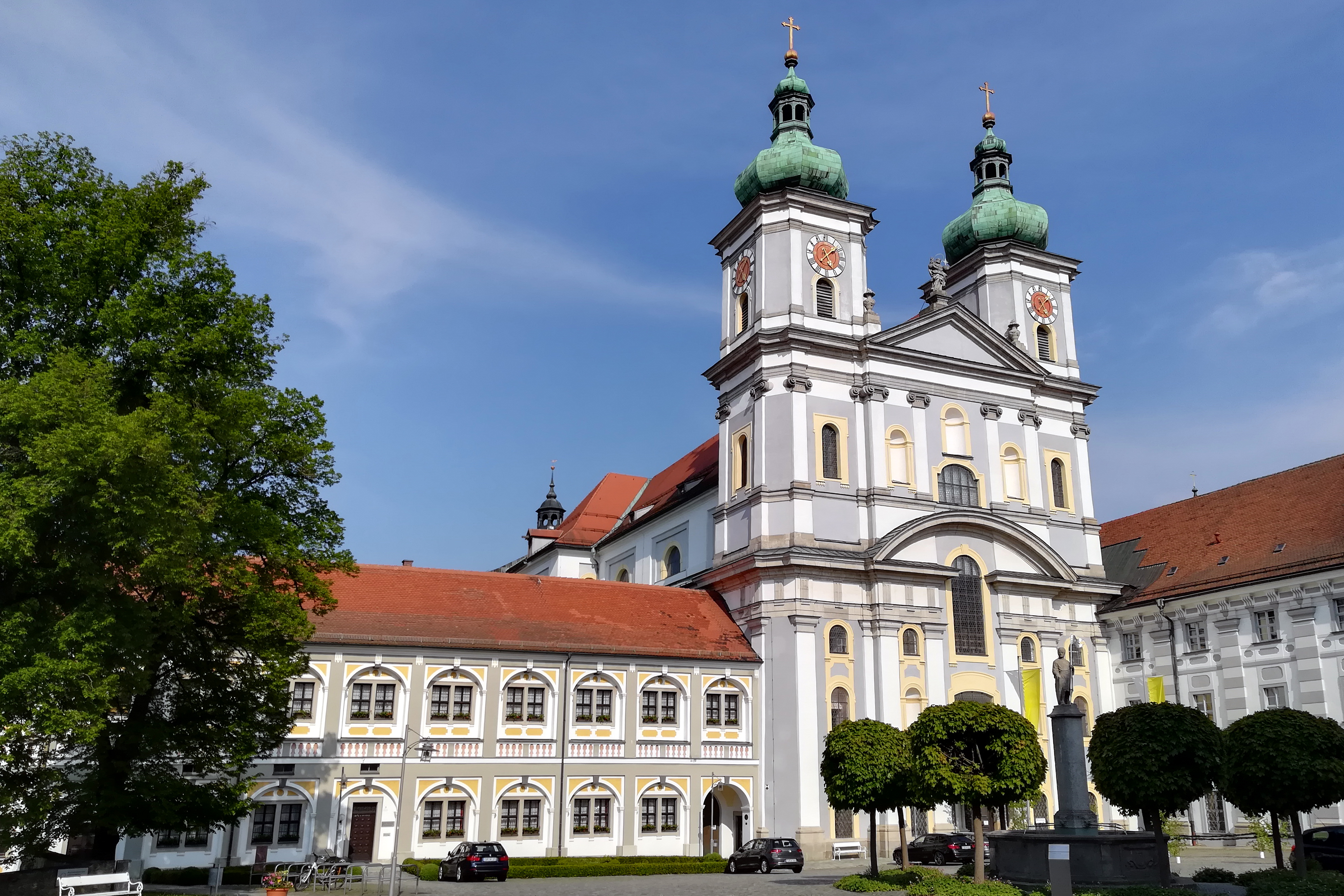
Stiftsbasilika in Waldsassen

J. B. Steane reviewed the soundtrack of the film on CD in Gramophone in December 1991. The disc's opening item, he wrote, Ave verum corpus, was "lovingly played, seamlessly sung". Leonard Bernstein's conducting of it was remarkable tender, yet also at times forceful – his response to Mozart's crescendos and decrescendos was "ready and one might almost say eager". This was not something that deserved to be censured. However, it was questionable whether he had been wise to decelerate the last bars of the piece as though reluctant to say goodbye to it, making Mozart sound Mahlerian.

In the C minor Mass too there were moments at which Mozart seemed a different composer than the one that most people thought him to be. Bernstein began the "Kyrie" at a slow pace that got even slower as the section continued. He conducted Mozart's reiterated seven-note setting of the word "eleison" in the "Christe eleison" passage like a lover clinging on to the object of his devotion. Happily one's fears that his interpretation might be about to lapse into mawkishness were dispelled by a "Gloria" that opened with a plenitude of energy, and with rhythmic vitality in the words "in excelsis". In this quick music, he set a faster tempo than was customary, just as he had earlier chosen an unusually slow tempo for the "Kyrie"'s andante moderato – maybe he had decided to emphasize the Mass's drama. Nobody could accuse him of treating the score with nothing more ambitious than a buttoned-up politeness.

There were times at which his approach showed one things in the music that one had not previously appreciated. The chorus "Gratias agimus tibi", for example, sounded as though its music might have been written for the "Credo"'s "Crucifixus", and even put one in mind of J. S. Bach's Passions. The dotted rhythm of "Qui tollis" was played with the maximum possible emphasis, and in that section's alla breve fugue, Mozart's counterpoint was "all striving, with a keen seizure of expression-marks, towards a climax that is as near to the Dionysian in its fervour as can be". No-one should buy Bernstein's disc unless they were willing to hear the Dionysus latent in Mozart called forth.

In any event, it was too late to ask Bernstein why he had conducted the music in the way in which he had. He had died soon after recording his album, and it was impossible to entirely forget that when listening to it. If he had wanted "to linger with this phrase or that, or in some way to draw the greatness of this music into line with his own feeling for music's greatness", it would not be appropriate to blame him.

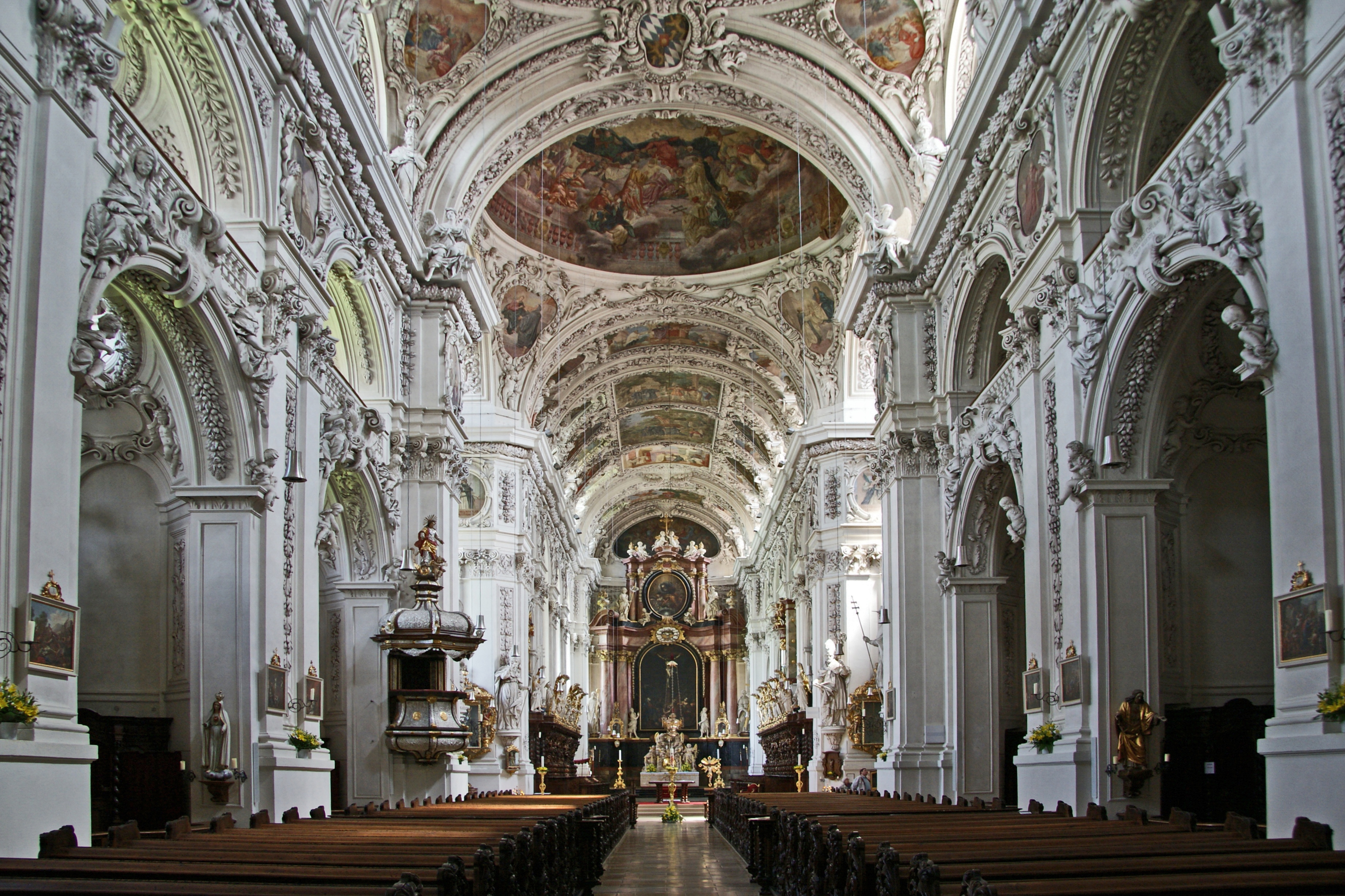
Interior of the Stiftsbasilika

John Eliot Gardiner had performed the Mass in a version that he had himself devised by emending Aloys Schmitt's work of 1901. Other conductors had used the reconstructions assembled by H. C. Robbins Landon or Helmut Eder. Bernstein's preference for the Franz Beyer edition was unorthodox but not, in the end, important. "In this instance, it is the conductor rather than the editor who determines what version of the great Mass we are to hear, for his own individuality [lays] upon it that embrace which he gave to all the music he loved".

David Patrick Stearns reviewed the soundtrack of the film on CD in Stereo Review in August 1992. The disc, he wrote, was "totally against the current trend toward small-scale Mozart performances, but the grandeur of Bernstein's conception – with dramatic outbursts, rubatos, and a lineup of star soloists ... – can be awe inspiring". The album was an essential purchase for devotees of Bernstein, even though he was not famed as a Mozartian and his conducting was not idiomatic.

The album was also discussed in a survey of the discography of the Great Mass in Gramophone and in Business Review Weekly, Diapason, International Record Review, Peter Gradenwitz's Leonard Bernstein: 1918–1990: Unendliche Vielfalt eines Musikers (1995), Renate Ulm and Doris Sennefelder's 50 Jahre Symphonieorchester des Bayerischen Rundfunks: 1949–1999 (1999) and The Penguin Guide to Recorded Music (2008).

== Home media history ==
In 1991, Deutsche Grammophon released a 71-minute soundtrack of the album (omitting Bernstein's talk) on chromium dioxide, Dolby B audio cassette (catalogue number 431-791-4) and on CD (catalogue number 431-791-2). The CD is accompanied by a 24-page insert booklet, designed under the art direction of Lutz Bode, including a photograph of Leonard Posch's 1789 boxwood relief of Mozart, a photograph of Waldsassen's Stiftsbasilika by Susesch Bayat, a photograph of Bernstein by Ludwig Schirmer, texts in English, French, German and Latin and notes by Peter Branscombe, Jean-Victor Hocquard, Wolfgang Hochstein and Paolo Gallarati in English, French, German and Italian respectively. Also in 1991, Deutsche Grammophon issued the album on an 86-minute VHS video cassette (catalogue number 072-185-3) and an 86-minute CLV (extended play) PAL Laserdisc (catalogue number 072-185-1), both with 4:3 colour video and the latter with CD-quality digital stereo audio.

In 2006, Deutsche Grammophon issued the album on an 86-minute Region 0 DVD (catalogue number 00440-073-4240), with 4:3 NTSC colour video and with audio in both PCM stereo and an ersatz 5.1-channel DTS upmix created by Emil Berliner Studios of Langenhagen using the company's AMSI II (Ambient Surround Imaging) technology. The DVD offers subtitles in Chinese, English, French, German, Latin and Spanish, and is accompanied by a 12-page booklet lacking texts but including notes by Wolfgang Stähr in English, French and German.
