= Stiftsbasilika Waldsassen =

Parish church in Waldsassen, Bavaria

Coordinates: 50°0′14″N 12°18′34″E

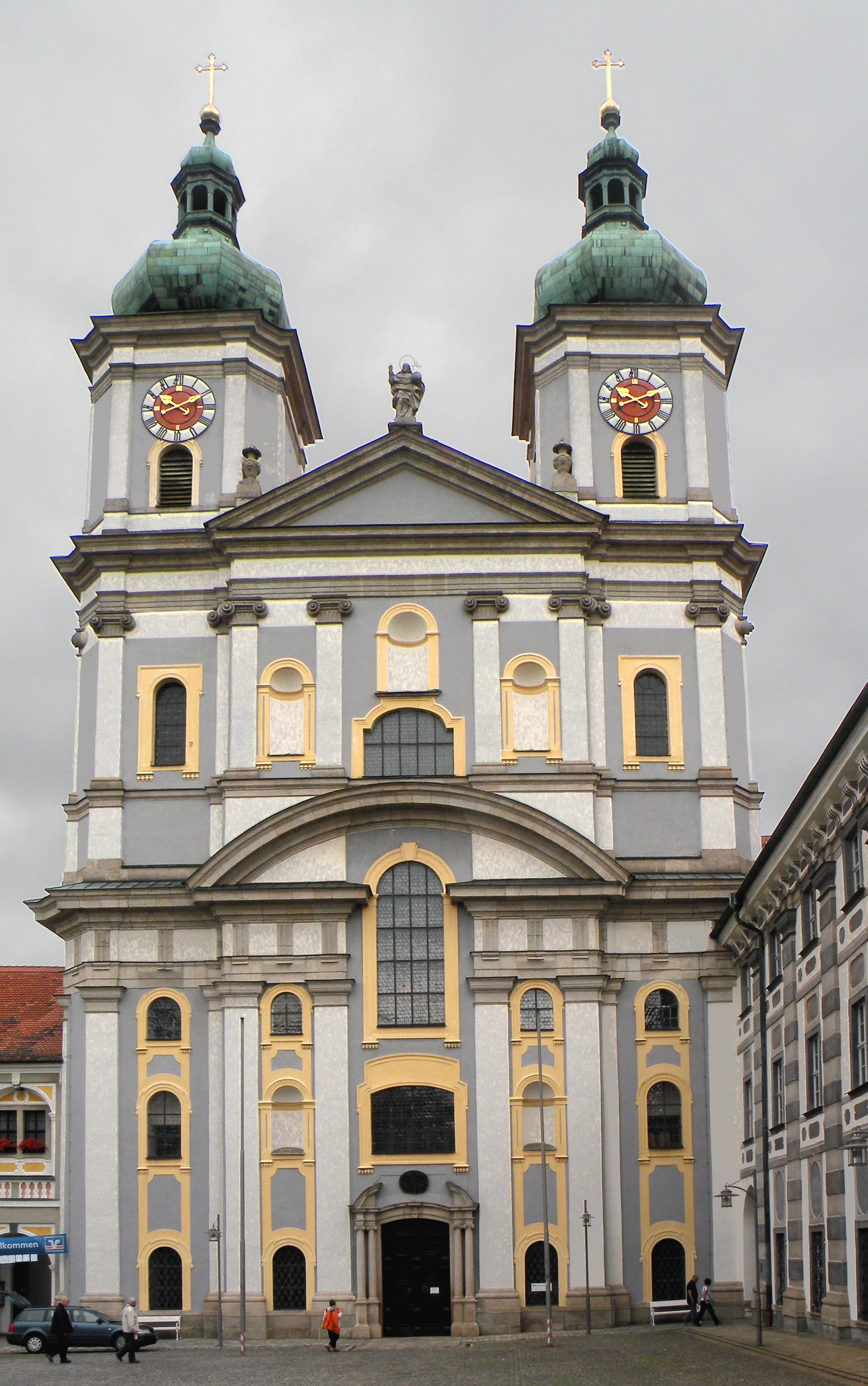
Stiftsbasilika Waldsassen

The Waldsassen Basilica, Mariä Himmelfahrt und St. Johannes Evangelist (Assumption of Mary and St. John the Evangelist) is the parish church in Waldsassen, Bavaria. It was built in its present form from 1685 to 1704 as part of the Waldsassen Abbey. With the secularization in 1803, the Cistercian abbey church became the Catholic parish church. In 1969, Pope Paul VI made it a papal basilica minor. The basilica is known for its display of jewelled skeletons.

== Architecture ==
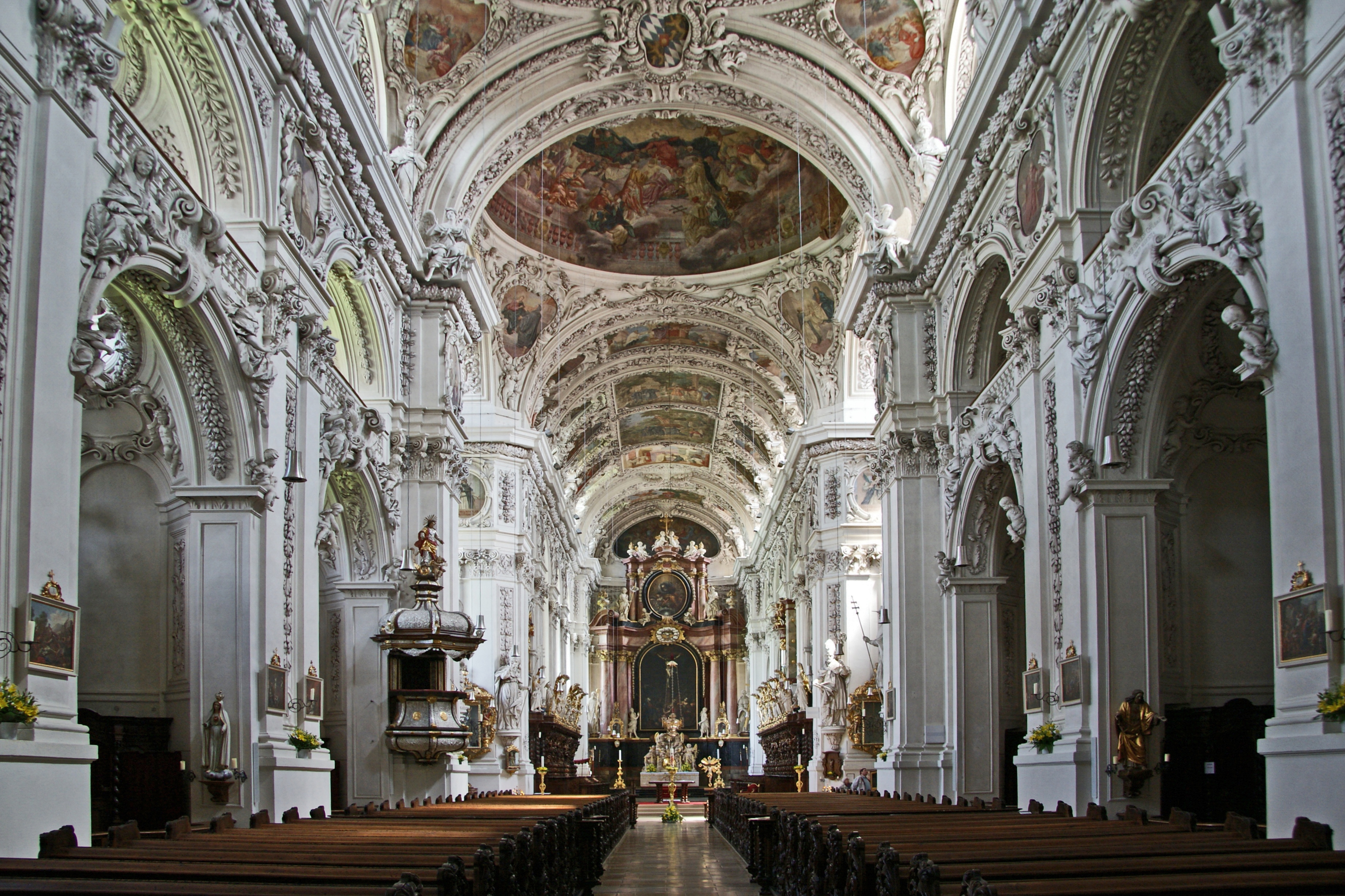
Interior

The building was designed as an abbey church by Georg Dientzenhofer and Abraham Leuthner in the Baroque style of Bavaria known as "böhmischer Hochbarock mit italienischer Prägung" (Bohemian high Baroque with Italian flavour). It was built from 1685 to 1704.

The church has a total length of 82 meters (269 ft). The nave has chapels and galleries on either side. The choir has decorative choir stalls. Under the nave is the largest crypt in Germany.

The decoration of the interior involved artists from various parts of Europe including Giovanni Battista Carlone who created the stucco works and Jakob Steinfels from Prague who painted the frescos. Those on the ceiling of the choir depict scenes of the legendary founding of the monastery Waldsassen.

The church contains ten reliquaries of richly dressed and bejewelled skeletons, the largest such display in Europe. The skeletons were removed from the catacombs of Rome and were ornamented by Adalbart Eder, a Cistercian lay brother and skilled goldsmith, in the 18th century. It was believed at the time that clairvoyant priests could, through prayer, determine the identities of these skeletal remains.

== Organ ==
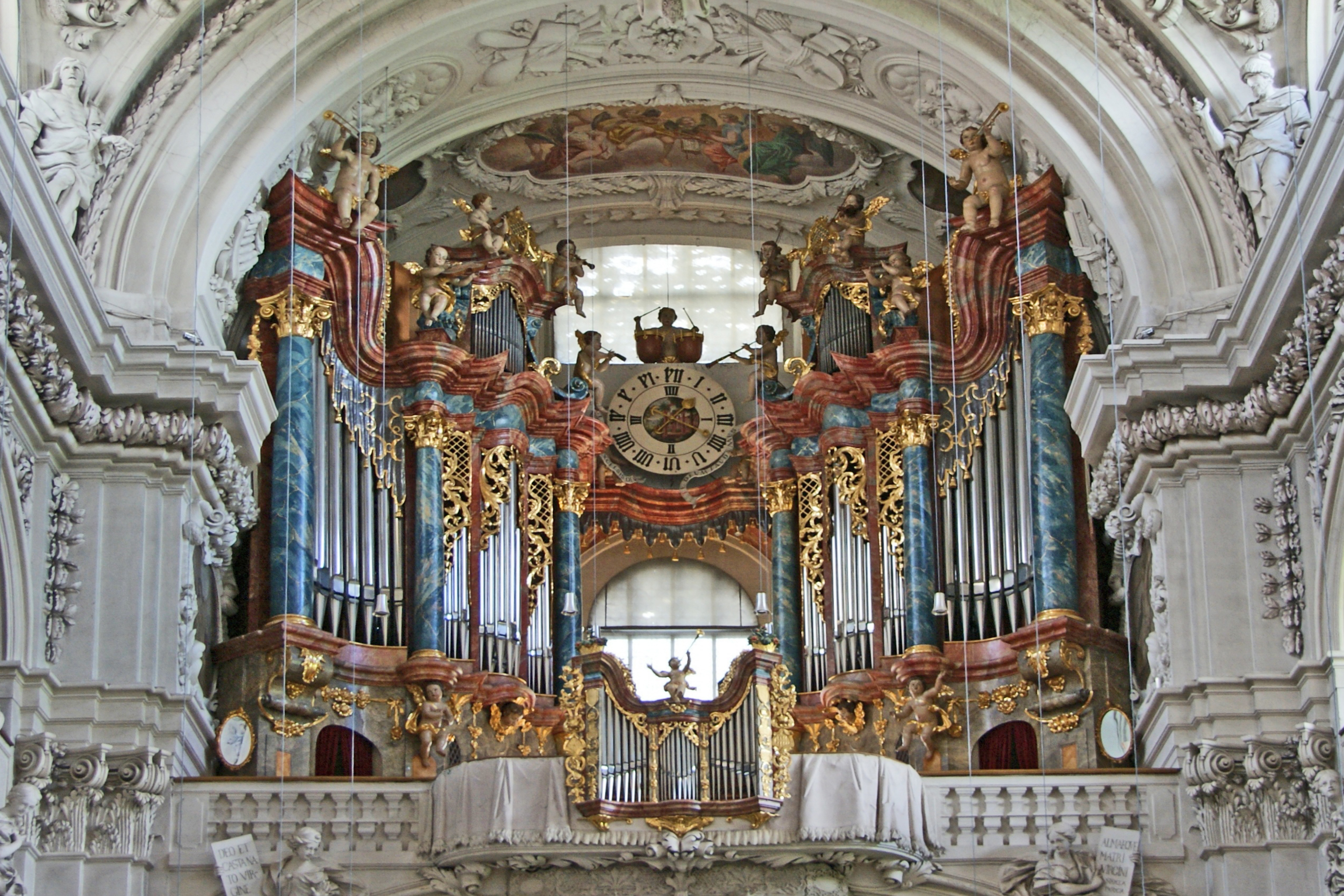
The Main Organ

The main organ was built in 1738 by Johann Konrad Brandenstein. From 1975 to 1976, E. Pfaff the organ was extensively rebuilt in the rococo housing. From 1982 to 1983, Georg Jann (Laberweinting) built new organs in the choir. From 1988 to 1989, Jann rebuilt all three organs after plans by Günther Kaunzinger, using partly the old pipes. In 1992 to 1993, two consoles were installed, both with six manuals, one on the gallery, and a movable one in the nave. The main instrument has 141 ranks, 101 stops and 7,720 pipes.

In addition to the church worship services, concerts are regularly held.

== The basilica on film ==
On 4 and 5 April 1990, Unitel visited the basilica to film Leonard Bernstein conducting three pieces of sacred music by Mozart - his Great Mass in C minor, his Exsultate, jubilate and his Ave verum corpus. An 86-minute DVD of the film was released by Deutsche Grammophon in 2006.

== See also ==
- Waldsassen Abbey
- Great Mass in C minor, K. 427 (Leonard Bernstein film)
