= Georg Jann =

German organ builder (1934–2019)

Georg Jann (17 January 1934 – 12 February 2019) was a German organ builder.

== Early life ==
Jann was born in Kalkberge. In 1948, he began his apprenticeship in Potsdam with organ builder Hans-Joachim Schuke. He moved to Switzerland in 1961, three years later to West Berlin, to work as voicer for Karl Schuke. Between 1968 and 1972, he worked as voicer for Rieger Orgelbau in Schwarzach, Vorarlberg (Austria). In 1974, he took over the workshop of organ builder Eduard Hirnschrodt in Regensburg, and a year later, built his first organ for the Catholic Church in Etzelwang. In 1977, the company was relocated to Laberweinting.

1993–1994, Georg Jann built his largest organ at Munich Cathedral, consisting of a choir organ (1993, 36 stops) and the great organ (1994, 95 stops), with a total of 131 stops.

Until 1995, Georg Jann ran his company under the name "Georg Jann Orgelbau Meisterbetrieb". He then handed the company to his son Thomas Jann, while Georg relocated to Portugal and established a new organ pipe workshop, "Orguian", along with two former employees. At the end of 2005, he handed this company to Detlef Jann, his oldest son.

== Selected works ==
Year	Location	Church	Image	Manuals	Stops
1979	Scheyern	Scheyern Abbey		III/P	39
1980	Tegernsee	Tegernsee Abbey		III/P	33
1986	Niederaltaich	Niederaltaich Abbey		IV/P	48
1989	Waldsassen	Stiftsbasilika		V/P	103
1993–1994	Munich	Munich Cathedral	Choir Organ/"Andreas-Orgel" (1993, III/P, 36 stops) & Great Organ (1994, IV/P, 95 stops)	IV/P	131
1995	Porto	Igreja da Lapa	Igreja da Lapa (Porto) 19	IV/P	64

== Bibliography ==
- Thomas Jann Orgelbau GmbH und Matthias Zimmer (ed.). Festschrift 50 Jahre Jann Orgelbau. Laberweinting, Allkofen: Self-Publishing, 2024.
