= Cornelius Hauptmann =

German opera and concert singer (born 1951)

Cornelius Hauptmann (born 14 June 1951) is a German opera and concert singer (bass).

== Life and career ==
Born in Stuttgart, Hauptmann studied at the State University of Music and Performing Arts Stuttgart. There he passed his stage examination in 1982 and as a student of Jakob Stämpfli he obtained the soloist diploma at the University of the Arts Bern. Master classes with Dietrich Fischer-Dieskau, Hans Hotter, Elisabeth Schwarzkopf (who supervised him for 24 years) and Eric Tappy made a significant contribution to his artistic development - as evidenced by numerous prizes and awards at international singing competitions. He was also a fellow of the Herbert von Karajan Foundation.

Hauptmann made his debut at the Staatstheater Stuttgart in 1982 and was a member of the opera houses in Heidelberg and Karlsruhe until 1989.

As a freelance concert and opera singer he has made guest appearances - primarily in Mozart's operas - in Munich, Leipzig, Orléans, Paris (Bastille and Châtelet), Lisbon, Madrid, Lyon, Berlin (Deutsche Oper), Amsterdam, Zurich, Vienna (Volksoper), etc. under conductors such as Gardiner, Hollreiser, Mehta, Haenchen, Nagano, Piollet, Marriner and others.

Especially in the concert field Hauptmann made a name for himself under conductors like Bernius, Bernstein, Bertini, Boulez, Corboz, Gardiner, Rilling, Harnoncourt, Hogwood, Masur, V. Neumann, Tilson Thomas, Welser-Möst, Sigiswald Kuijken, Cao and others.

Hauptmann teaches singing in master classes alongside private students and is a member of the jury at various singing competitions.

== Lullaby project ==
As a member of the board of the Internationale Hugo-Wolf-Akademie, Hauptmann initiated the lullaby project, in which 52 singers with German language roots sing 52 cradle and lullabies. Since October 2008, this project has been produced by Stuttgart-based Carus-Verlag and SWR and supervised by Hauptmann as artistic director. From December 2009 on, SWR and other affiliated radio stations broadcast a new lullaby every week for one year, 2 CDs and accompanying books were released. This charity project ("Herzenssache" Foundation) is supported by the German Chancellor Angela Merkel as patron and by the publishers Reclam and Die Zeit. The project has been continued with folk song since 2010 and with children's song since 2011. Christmas songs appeared in autumn 2012.

For this project Hauptmann was awarded the "Gräfin-Sonja-Gedächtnispreis" by Count Christian Bernadotte on the island of Mainau by the "Singen mit Kindern" Foundation in December 2011.

Since August 2012 Hauptmann has been chairman of the board of the German Tonkünstlerverband Baden-Württemberg and since April 2014 president of the German Tonkünstlerverband DTKV.

== Selected discography ==
Hauptmann released numerous CDs:

- Passions by Bach
- Masses and operas by Mozart
- Schumann's Paradies und Peri (Gardiner/DG)
- Monteverdi, Mendelssohn, Schütz, Schubert (Bernius/Carus)
- Haydn's Stabat mater (Pinnock/Deutsche GrammophonDG); by Enescu's Œdipe (Foster/EMI)
- Mozart's The Magic Flute (Norrington/EMI and Kuijken/Bayer)
- Beethoven's Missa solemnis (Herreweghe/Harmonia mundi)
- Mozart's Great Mass in C minor (Bernstein/DG)
- Mozart's Requiem (Bernstein/DG)

== Select videography ==
- Mozart's Great Mass in C minor (Bernstein/DG)
