= Carl Amand Mangold =

German composer, violinist and conductor

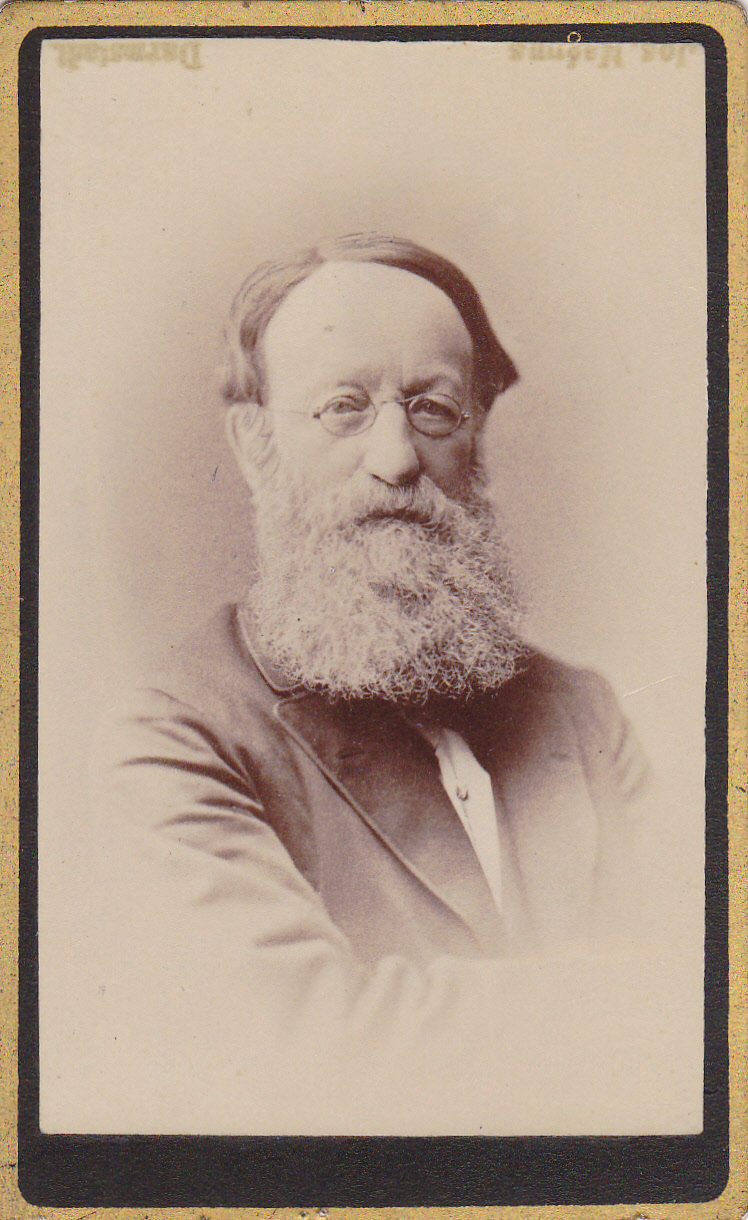
Carl Amand Mangold

Carl Ludwig Amand Mangold (8 October 1813 – 4 August 1889) was a German composer, violinist and conductor.

== Biography ==
Mangold was born in Darmstadt and received his initial musical education from his father. In 1831 he entered the orchestra of the ducal chapel at Darmstadt. A journey to London in 1834 acquainted him with the work of Handel. From 1835 he appeared in Darmstadt not only as a violinist, but also as a singer. Between 1836 and 1839 he studied at the Paris Conservatory and made the acquaintance of Berlioz, Chopin, Meyerbeer, Liszt, and Clara Wieck. After his return to Darmstadt in 1839 he became the director of the local "Musikverein", which in the course of the following years performed all of his major oratorio and cantata works. In 1848, he was made "Hofmusikdirektor" (court music director) at Darmstadt Castle. His second opera, Tannhäuser (1845), was written at the same time as Wagner's work of the same title, but without mutual knowledge. Apparently, performances of Mangold's work beyond Darmstadt were hampered out of consideration for Wagner. After Mangold's death the music was refitted to a new libretto by Ernst Pasqué as Der getreue Eckart (1892). Mangold was a co-founder of the regional music festival "Mittelrheinische Musikfeste" and conducted there in 1856 and 1868. He died in Oberstdorf.

Mangold's oratorio Abraham (1860) has been recorded on CD in 1986.

== Selected compositions ==
Operas

- Fiesco, Opera (1840; not performed)
- Das Köhlermädchen, oder Das Tournier zu Linz (libretto H. Wilke), romantic opera in 3 acts (Darmstadt, 1843)
- Tanhäuser (Eduard Duller), opera in 4 acts (1843–1845; Darmstadt, 1846)
- Dornröschen (Sleeping Beauty) (E. Duller), ballet with voices (Darmstadt, 1848)
- Die Fischerin (after Goethe); singspiel in 1 Act (1848)
- Rübezahl (E. Duller), opera (1848)
- Gudrun (libretto by composer), grand opera in 4 acts, op. 36 (1850; Darmstadt, 1851)
- Der Cantor von Fichtenhagen, comic opera in 2 acts

Oratorios and cantatas

- Wittekind (1843), oratorio on Widukind, the Saxon leader against Charlemagne during the Saxon Wars
- Elysium (1845), symphonic cantata
- Die Hermannschlacht op. 30 (1848)
- Frithjof op. 72 (1856)
- Abraham (1859), oratorio
- Israel in der Wüste (1863), oratorio
- Hermanns Tod (1870)
- Barbarossas Erwachen (1874)
- Sawitri (1882)

Further works

- some 260 works for male voice choir
- some 375 solo and religious songs

== Selected recordings ==
- Abraham, performed by Gilles Cachemaille, Mechthild Georg, Michael Ruhr, Monika Frimmer, Thomas Sehrbrock, Konzertchor Darmstadt, Philharmonisches Orchester Darmstadt, Wolfgang Seeliger, on: Christophorus, 2CD (1986).
