= Ave verum corpus =

Short Eucharistic chant

Ave verum corpus is a short Eucharistic chant that has been set to music by many composers. It dates to the 13th century, first recorded in a central Italian Franciscan manuscript (Chicago, Newberry Library, 24). A Reichenau manuscript of the 14th century attributes it to Pope Innocent (variously identified as Innocent III, Innocent IV, Innocent V, or Innocent VI)

During the Middle Ages, it was sung at the elevation of the Eucharist during the consecration at Mass. It was also used frequently during Benediction of the Blessed Sacrament.

The prayer is a meditation on Jesus's Real Presence in the Blessed Sacrament, and ties it to the redemptive meaning of suffering in the life of all believers.

== Text ==
Latin
Ave verum corpus, natum
de Maria Virgine, (Note: Other versions have ex Maria Virgine.)
vere passum, immolatum
in cruce pro homine
cuius latus perforatum
fluxit aqua et sanguine: (Note: Other versions have unda fluxit et sanguine or unda fluxit sanguine or vero fluxit sanguine.)
esto nobis prægustatum
in mortis examine. (Note: Other versions have mortis in examine.)

O Iesu dulcis, O Iesu pie,
O Iesu, fili Mariae.
Miserere mei. Amen. (Note: Other versions have Miserere nobis.)

Hail, true Body, born
of the Virgin Mary,
truly suffered, sacrificed
on the cross for mankind,
from whose pierced side
flowed water and blood:
Be for us a foretaste [of the Heavenly banquet]
in the trial of death!

O sweet Jesus, O holy Jesus,
O Jesus, son of Mary,
have mercy on me. Amen.

== Musical settings ==
Musical settings include Mozart's motet Ave verum corpus (K. 618), as well as settings by William Byrd and Sir Edward Elgar. Not all composers set the whole text. For example, Mozart's setting finishes with "in mortis examine", Elgar's with "fili Mariae". Marc-Antoine Charpentier composed three versions: H.233, H.266 and H.329.

There is a version by Franz Liszt [Searle 44]. There are also versions by Camille Saint-Saëns, Orlande de Lassus, Imant Raminsh, Alexandre Guilmant, William Mathias, Colin Mawby, Malcolm Archer and Jack Gibbons. Liszt also composed a fantasy on Mozart's work, preceded by a version of Allegri's celebrated Miserere, under the title À la Chapelle Sixtine [Searle 461 – two versions]. Versions of this fantasy for orchestra [Searle 360] and piano four-hands [Searle 633] follow closely the second version for piano.

There is also a version for organ [Searle 658] with the title Evocation à la Chapelle Sixtine. The chant is included Poulenc's opera Dialogues of the Carmelites. The composer wrote a different "Ave verum corpus" in 1952.

Mozart's version, with instruments only, was adapted by Pyotr Ilyich Tchaikovsky as one of the sections of his Mozartiana, a tribute to Mozart. Colin Mawby has done a setting in the 20th century; from the 21st century, there are settings by the Swedish composer Fredrik Sixten and the English composer Philip Stopford.
