= La rencontre imprévue =

Opera by Christoph Willibald Gluck

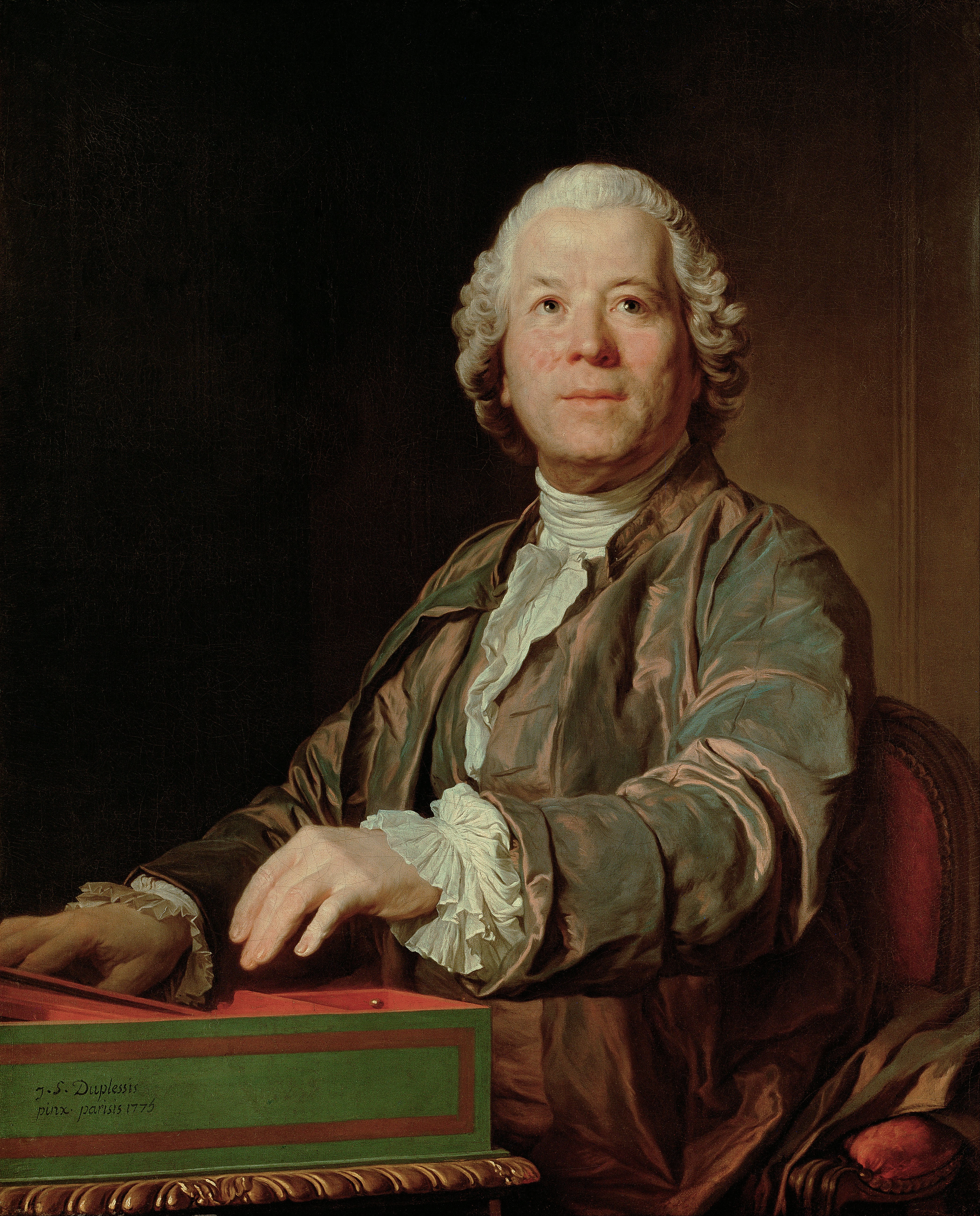
Portrait of Christoph Willibald Gluck by Joseph Duplessis (1775)

La rencontre imprévue, ou Les pèlerins de la Mecque Wq. 32 (The Unexpected Encounter, or The Pilgrims to Mecca) is a three-act opéra comique, composed in 1763 by Christoph Willibald Gluck to a libretto by Louis Dancourt after the 1726 comédie en vaudeville Les pèlerins de la Mecque by Alain-René Lesage and d'Orneval. The death of Isabella of Parma, the archduke's wife, occasioned a revision of the spoken text downplaying the feigned death by which princess Rezia tests her beloved. The work was first performed in this form as La rencontre imprévue at the Burgtheater, Vienna on 7 January 1764. Dancourt's original text, titled Les pèlerins de la Mecque and designated as a comédie mêlée d'ariettes, was not premiered until 1990 (see Recordings).

== Performance history ==
Gluck's longest opéra-comique and considered his finest, La rencontre imprévue was his most popular work in the genre in the 18th century. It was performed in French in Brussels (1766), Bordeaux (as Ali et Rezia, 19 May 1766), Amsterdam (1768), The Hague (1768), Mannheim (1768), Copenhagen (1772), Liège (23 December 1776), Cassel (1780), Lille (17 November 1783), and Marseille (1784). It was translated into German as Die unvermuthete Zusammenkunft oder Die Pilgrimme von Mecca and performed in Frankfurt (16 April 1771), Vienna (1776 at the Kärntnertor Theater; 26 July 1780 at the Burgtheater), Munich (9 March 1779), Berlin (17 October 1783, the first Gluck opera to be performed there), and many other cities.

The opera was first performed in Paris on 1 May 1790 by the Opéra-Comique at the first Salle Favart in an arrangement by Jean-Pierre Solié with the title Les fous de Médine, ou La rencontre imprévue. It was revived by the Opéra-Comique in Gluck's arrangement (as Les pèlerins de la Mecque) on 20 December 1906, and also produced at the Trianon Lyrique on 8 November 1923.

A new German translation by Carl Hagemann with the title Die Pilger von Mekka was performed in Wiesbaden (October 1922), Basel (26 September 1924), Berlin (18 February 1928), and Vienna (June 1931).

In an English translation by Geoffrey Dunn, it was broadcast on the BBC Third Programme on 30 October 1955 conducted by Charles Mackerras, with Alexander Young, Ian Wallace, Rupert Davies and Bruce Boyce among the cast.

== Legacy ==
La rencontre imprévue was adapted and supplied with new music by Haydn as L'incontro improvviso (1775) and the 1780 Vienna revival of Gluck's version presumably inspired the plot of Mozart's Die Entführung aus dem Serail. In 1784 Mozart wrote a set of variations for piano (K. 455) on Calender's aria "Unser dummer Pöbel meint" ("Les hommes pieusement"). In 1887 the variations were orchestrated by Tchaikovsky as the final movement of his orchestral Suite No. 4 Mozartiana.

== Roles ==
Role	Voice type	Premiere cast, 7 January 1764 (Conductor: – )
Rezia, beloved of Ali, prisoner of the Sultan	soprano	
Balkis, Rezia's attendant	soprano	
Dardané, Rezia's attendant	soprano	
Amine, Rezia's attendant	soprano	Maria Teresa Sartori
Ali, Prince of Balsora	haute-contre	Godard
Osmin, Ali's slave	tenor	Pierre-Nicolas Oyez
Vertigo, a painter	baritone	Le Noble
Calender, a dervish	bass	Vincent Hédoux
Le Sultan d'Égypte	tenor	
Le chef de caravane	bass	

== Recordings ==
- 1990 – Guy de Mey (Ali), Lynne Dawson (Rezia), Catherine Dubosc (Dardané), Sophie Marin-Degor (Amine), Claudine Le Coz (Balkis), Jean-Luc Viala (Osmin), Guy Flechter (Le Sultan d'égypte), Jean-Philippe Lafont (Vertigo), Gilles Cachemaille (Le calender), Francis Dudziak (La chef de Caravane) – Orchestre de l'Opéra de Lyon, Sir John Eliot Gardiner – 2 CDs Erato (world première recording; in cooperation with MusiFrance and Radio France).
- 1990 – Robert Gambill (Ali), Julie Kaufmann (Rezia), Annegeer Stumphius (Dardané), Anne-Marie Rodde (Amine), Iris Vermillion (Balkis), Claes-Håkan Ahnsjö (Osmin), Ulrich Reß (Le Sultan d'égypte), Malcolm Walker (Vertigo), Jan-Hendrik Rootering (Le calender), Paolo Orecchia (La chef de Caravane) – Münchner Rundfunkorchester, Leopold Hager – 3 CDs Orfeo (issued 2016).
