= L'incontro improvviso =

Opera by Joseph Haydn

- dramma giocoso by Joseph Haydn
- Portrait of the composer by Thomas Hardy, in 1791
- Translation: The unexpected encounter
- Librettist: Karl Frieberth
- Language: Italian
- Premiere: 29 August 1775; Eszterháza

L’incontro improvviso (The unexpected encounter) (Hob. XXVIII:6) is an opera in three acts by Joseph Haydn first performed at Eszterháza on 29 August 1775 to mark the four-day visit of Archduke Ferdinand, Habsburg governor of Milan, and his consort Maria Beatrice d'Este. The opera is designated a dramma giocoso (a comic opera) and is an example of the then Austrian fascination with Turkish subjects.

== Composition and Performance History ==
The libretto by Karl Frieberth was adapted and translated from a French opéra comique by L. H. Dancourt, already set by Gluck in 1764 as the La rencontre imprévue. In keeping with Italian practice, Friberth constructed longer buffo finale texts at the end of Acts I and II.

It is not known if any further performances followed the Eszterháza production, although a German translation was made for Bratislava. Danish musicologist Jens Peter Larsen discovered the autograph score in Leningrad in 1954, and the opera was subsequently broadcast in Russian in 1956. It was first staged in the UK at the Camden Festival in 1966. The first complete recording was made by Philips in 1980 in association with the Radio Suisse Romande and the European Broadcasting Union, conducted by Antal Doráti. The first performance of the German translation was staged by Jakob Peter-Messer for the Wuppertal Opera in 2010 in cooperation with the Haydn-Institut in Cologne.

== Roles ==
Role	Voice type	Premiere Cast, 29 August 1775 (Conductor: Joseph Haydn)
Ali, Prince of Balsóra, in love with Rezia	tenor	Carl Friberth
Rezia, Princess of Persia, harem favourite of the Sultan of Egypt	soprano	Magdalena Friberth
Balkis, a slave, confidante of Rezia	soprano	Barbara Dichtler
Dardane, a slave, confidante of Rezia	mezzo-soprano	Maria Elisabeth Prandtler
Osmin, Ali’s slave	tenor	Leopold Dichtler
Calandro, A Qalandar or mendicant dervish	baritone	Christian Specht
Sultan, of Egypt	bass	Melchior Griesler
Ufficiale (An officer)	tenor	
Male and female slaves, janissaries

== Synopsis ==
Overture (printed by Artaria in a set of six in 1782 without trumpets and percussion)

=== Act I ===
A storehouse of all kinds of merchandise and edibles
The qalandar and dervishes drink wine, smoke tobacco and sing merrily of their life as beggars and tricksters.
A square
Osmin is distracted by the qalandar begging; he has little trouble in persuading the hungry Osmin to become a mendicant dervish.
A room in the seraglio
Rezia has been told that her long-lost love has been sighted in Cairo, and shares the news with Balkis and Dardane in a beautiful trio.
A square
Ali, alone, explains how he fled to Persia and fell in love with Rezia. Though betrothed to another, Rezia eloped with Ali but they were separated and she was captured by pirates. Ali watches as Osmin is taught by the Qalandar the chant "Castagna, castagna". The Qalandar recognises Ali as the Prince of Balsóra. Balkis greets Ali with news that a woman has espied him from a window in the seraglio and wishes to meet him.
A room containing a banquet table
Osmin is enjoying a feast with Ali arrives with Balkis, and Ali gets increasingly angry with Osmin's inebriation.

=== Act II ===
A room with a sofa
Dardane tries to charm Ali to test his faithfulness. Rezia enters, taking Ali and Osmin by surprise. The three women tell of the unfortunate travels which brought them to Cairo.
The qalandar's room
Osmin informs the qalandar that Ali's lover is Rezia and solicits his help in letting the couple escape.
A garden
While preparations are made for a banquet before their escape, Rezia and Ali sing a love duet. The mood is shattered when Balkis and Dardane come in to announce that the Sultan has returned unexpectedly from the hunt. Everyone flees via a secret staircase.

=== Act III ===
Night. The qalandar's storehouse
News of the Sultan's reward for the recovery of Rezia has reached the qalandar who decides to betray them to win the bounty. Ali disguises himself as a French painter to avoid arrest, but to no avail. The Sultan however forgives them and condemns the treacherous qalandar.
A hall lit by chandeliers
The Sultan pardons Rezia and Ali and gives them his blessing. At the couple's request the qalandar is pardoned, but banished from Cairo.

== Music ==
Although not Haydn's greatest success in the operatic field, L'incontro improvviso does include some high-class and varied music. As well as the 'Turkish' music, amusing scenes for Osmin and Calandro, the 'painting' aria in the last act where Ali describes the contents of a picture with orchestral help, and another aria "Senti, al buio pian" for Osmin with orchestral colouring, there is Italian lyricism evident in arias for Ali ("Deh! se in ciel pietade avete") and Rezia ("Or vicina a te"). Act II has two powerful arias for sopranos; Haydn detached Rezia's "Or vicina a te" and published it separately in 1783. The Act I trio "Mi sembra un sogno,” which contrasts the three women’s voices with muted violins, cors anglais, and horns, is also considered a highlight.

The work is scored for an orchestra consisting of 2 oboes (doubling cors anglais), 2 bassoons, 2 trumpets, 2 horns, timpani, percussion, violins I & II, viola, cello, bass and continuo.

== Recordings ==
- 1979 – Claes H. Ahnsjö (Ali), Linda Zoghby (Rezia), Margaret Marshall (Balkis), Della Jones (Dardane), Domenico Trimarchi (Osmin), Benjamin Luxon (Calandro), Jonathan Prescott (Sultan), James Hooper (Ufficiale) – Orchestre de Chambre de Lausanne, Antal Doráti – 3 CDs (Philips Records). The issue also featured three arias and a trio, originally written by Haydn for L'incontro improvviso, sung by Claes H. Ahnsjö, Aldo Baldin and Michael Devlin, with the Orchestre de Chambre de Lausanne, conducted by Doráti.
- 2023 Bernhard Berchtold, Elisabeth Breuer, Anna Willerding, Annastina Malm, Markus Miesenberger, Rafael Fingerlos, Michael Wagner, L'Orfeo Barockorchester, Michi Gaigg 2CD CPO
