= Philip Stopford =

English choral composer and director (born 1977)

Philip W. J. Stopford (born 1977) is an English organist and composer best known for his choral works.

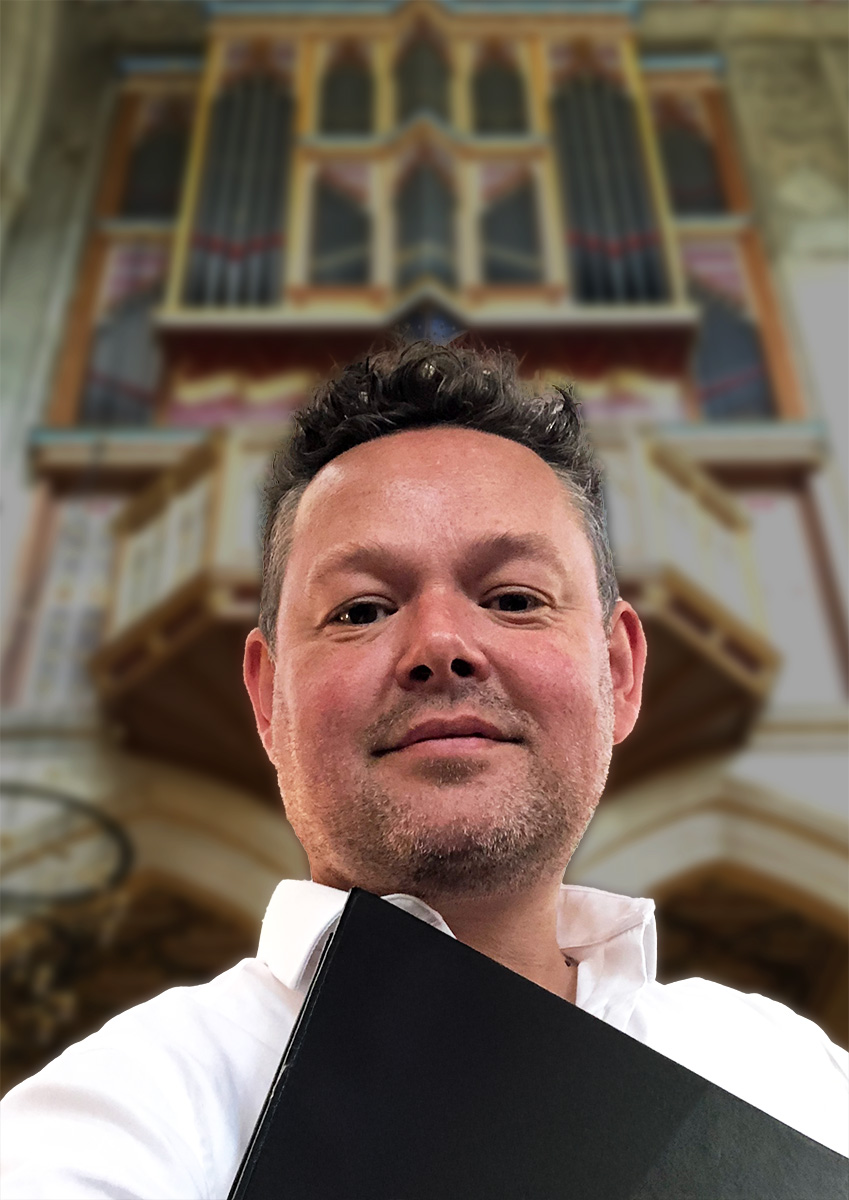
Philip Stopford, choral composer (2024)

== Early life and training ==
Stopford began his musical career as a chorister at Westminster Abbey from 1986 to 1990, during which time he also took up the piano, organ and violin. He was awarded a music scholarship to Bedford School, which he attended from 1990 to 1995.

Later he studied for a Bachelor of Arts in music at the University of Oxford, where from 1996 to 1999 he also served as organ scholar at Keble College.

== Career ==
From 1995 to 1996 Stopford was organ scholar at Truro Cathedral, where he worked under Andrew Nethsingha and published his first choral works. After university he was organ scholar at Canterbury Cathedral from 1999 to 2000 before becoming Assistant Organist at Chester Cathedral.

In 2003 he moved to Northern Ireland, where he served as Director of Music at St Anne's Cathedral in Belfast until the post was closed in 2010.

For the next few years Stopford pursued a career as a composer and conductor before being appointed Director of Music at Christ Church in Bronxville, New York, in 2016, having spent part of the previous year there as composer-in-residence.

In 2021 he returned to the United Kingdom, where he currently serves as President of the Leighton Buzzard Festival Singers.

== Works ==
Stopford is known for his contemporary a cappella and accompanied settings of traditional Latin and English prayers and hymns, including "Ave Verum Corpus", titled "Ave Verum"; "Lullay, My Liking"; the Coventry Carol, titled "Lully, Lulla, Lullay"; and "In My Father's House". Three of Stopford's works appeared in the Classic FM Hall of Fame in 2014, after he made his first appearance on the chart in 2013.

He has composed numerous other works, including a Te Deum, a Latin Mass titled "Missa Deus Nobiscum" and various Latin canticles. Missa Deus Nobiscum was commissioned to celebrate the 150th anniversary of Methodist College Belfast; its first performance was in the Waterfront Hall, Belfast, on 14 March 2019.

Stopford also serves as director of the professional choir Ecclesium, which has released many CDs of his works.
