= Kleine Gigue in G, K. 574 =

1789 piano composition by W. A. Mozart

Sheet music (2 pages)

Kleine Gigue in G major, K. 574, is a composition for solo piano by Wolfgang Amadeus Mozart during his stay in Leipzig. It is dated 16 May 1789, the day before he left Leipzig. It was directly written into the notebook of Leipzig court organist Carl Immanuel Engel. It is often cited as a tribute by Mozart to J. S. Bach, although many scholars have likened it to Handel's Gigue from the Suite No. 8 in F minor, HWV 433. In fact, the subject of the gigue bears a marked similarity to the subject of J. S. Bach's B minor fugue no. 24 from book 1 of The Well-Tempered Clavier. Mozart has changed the tempo from Largo to Allegro deciso and the time signature from common time to 6/8 but the similarity between the two is unmistakable.

MIDI rendition

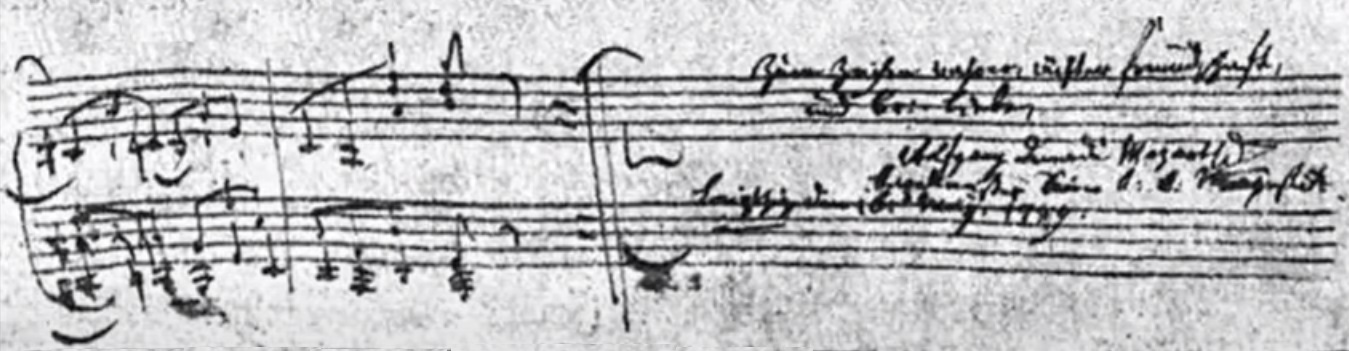
Mozart's dedication

The gigue consists of only 38 bars and is written in 6/8 time. The bass line in the last four bars of the first half, and its transposed repetition in the second half before the coda, are notable for including all tones of the chromatic scale. However they are not tone rows as some tones are repeated.

Tchaikovsky based the opening movement of his Mozartiana orchestral suite on this work.
