= Louis Hurtaut Dancourt =

French librettist, dramatist, and actor

Louis Hurtaut Dancourt (1725 – 29 July 1801) was a French librettist, dramatist, and actor.

== Career ==
He was born Louis Heurteaux in Paris, and later adopted Dancourt as a pseudonym. He was unsuccessful in Paris as an actor and appeared in the French provinces in Rennes, Strasbourg, Bordeaux, and Rouen, as well as outside France in Bayreuth, Munich, Berlin, and Brussels.

In Berlin after 1755, he wrote the libretto of Le triple horoscope, a divertissement with music composed by Gaultier. In 1762, with a favorable recommendation from Charles Simon Favart, he joined the French company performing in Vienna. His libretto for La rencontre imprévue, ou Les pèlerins de la Mecque (1763), a three-act opéra-comique, was set to music by Christoph Willibald Gluck and first performed on 7 January 1764 in Vienna. Dancourt was able to mount revivals in Brussels in 1765, Bordeaux (as Ali et Rezia) in 1766, and Paris (as Les fous de Médine, ou La rencontre imprévue, with music arranged by Jean-Pierre Solié) in 1790. It was adapted and translated into Italian by Carl Friberth and inspired Haydn's L'incontro improvviso (1775).

In addition to his career as an actor and librettist, Dancourt authored a rebuttal to Jean-Jacques Rousseau's Letter to M. D'Alembert on Spectacles. Rousseau had argued against the city of Geneva building a theater, arguing that it would corrupt their egalitarian republican principles. He had also argued against women appearing in public and had attacked their virtue. In Dancourt's response, Dancourt, Arlequin de Berlin à M. Jean-Jacques Rousseau, he defends the morality of the theater as well as the virtue and intellectual capacity of women, and he makes a vigorous argument in favor of women's education.

He died in Paris.

Other librettos include:

- Le mariage par capitulation, music by Jean-Joseph Rodolphe, 1764
- Éscope à Cythère, music by Jean-Claude Trial, 1766
- Scamandre, pastoral, music by Rozière, Dugué, and Feyseau the younger, Bordeaux, 1766
- Le combat nocturne, ou Les morts vivants, music by Claude Le Petit, 1769
- Jephté, music by Henri-Joseph Rigel, 1783
- Ariane, fille de Minos, music by Rigel, 1784
- Le faux serment, ou La matronne de Gonesse, music by Prosper-Didier Deshayes, 1785
- Atine et Zamorin, ou L'amour turc, music by Rigel, 1786
- L'art d'aimer, ou L'amour au village, music by Louis-Sébastien Lebrun, 1790
- Le magot de la Chine, music by Rigel, 1800
