= Günther Kaunzinger =

German musician

Günther Kaunzinger (born 10 April 1938) is a German organist and pianist.

== Life ==
Born in Sulzbach, Kaunzinger studied organ, piano, conducting and composition in Nuremberg and Frankfurt (Main), where he also worked as a coach at the Opera.

He has won numerous competitions, including in 1966 a third Prize at the ARD Competition. From 1968 to 1974 he studied organ in Paris with Marie-Claire Alain, Maurice Duruflé and Jean Guillou. He developed a reputation as a performer of both French Romanticism and as an improviser. In 1974 he was appointed to the chair of organ at the Hochschule für Musik Würzburg and was appointed head of the department of church music. Until 1976, he also led a piano class. In 1976, he was appointed both head of the organ department at the Catholic University of America and "artist in residence" at the National Shrine of the Immaculate Conception in Washington, D.C. He returned to his position in Würzburg in 1978.

Kaunzinger recorded more than 50 CDs. In 1980, 1982 and 1988, his recordings were awarded the Deutscher Schallplattenpreis, for several complete recordings, for example the organ works of César Franck and Louis Vierne. He was awarded many honours, including in 1988 the culture prize of Sulzbach-Rosenberg. In 2001, he was awarded the Order of Merit with Ribbon of the Federal Republic of Germany.

The dispositions of new organs, which he supervised, are inspired by the tradition of Aristide Cavaillé-Coll. He conceived the organ of the Stiftsbasilika Waldsassen, built by Georg Jann with 6 manuals and 103 stops. He founded the "Memminger Meisterkurse für Orgelinterpretation" (Memmingen masterclasses for organ interpretation), with an emphasis on French romanticism.

== Publications ==
- Günther Kaunzinger: Die Orgeln der Stiftsbasilika Waldsassen. Kunstverlag Peda, Passau 1989, ISBN 3-927296-12-0
