= Frank Lopardo =

American operatic tenor (born 1957)

- Born: December 23, 1957 (age 68); Brentwood, New York, U.S.
- Education: Queens College, CUNY
- Occupation: Tenor

Frank Lopardo (born 23 December 1957) is an American operatic tenor who was born in Brentwood, New York. Early in his career he specialized in the repertoire of Mozart and Rossini and later transitioned to the works of Puccini, Verdi, Donizetti and Bellini.

== Early years ==
Lopardo began his musical training at Queens College, CUNY before moving on to the Juilliard School. At Queens College he first met Dr. Robert White, who currently serves on the staff at the Juilliard School. Lopardo attended the Music Academy of the West summer conservatory program in 1983 and 1984.

== Career ==
Lopardo made his North American debut as Tamino in Die Zauberflöte with Opera Theater of St. Louis. He entered into a long-standing relationship with The Metropolitan Opera in New York in 1989 in the role of Almaviva in Il barbiere di Siviglia. He has performed more than 180 times there, with roles including Rodolfo in La bohème, Alfredo in La traviata, the Duke in Rigoletto, Edgardo in Lucia di Lammermoor, Tonio in La fille du régiment, Nemorino in L'elisir d'amore, Don Ottavio in Don Giovanni, Idreno in Semiramide, Ferrando in Così fan tutte, and Fenton in Falstaff. Lopardo has made appearances with various North American opera companies, including the Lyric Opera of Chicago, Los Angeles Opera, Houston Grand Opera, Dallas Opera, the Canadian Opera Company, San Francisco Opera, and Santa Fe Opera.

In Europe, Lopardo made his debut as Fenton at Teatro di San Carlo in Naples. He has sung as Edgardo, Rodolfo, the Duke, and Lenski in Eugene Onegin at the Opéra National de Paris. At the Royal Opera House, Covent Garden he has sung as Lindoro in L'italiana in Algeri. Other major European theaters where he has performed include the Vienna State Opera, the Grand Théâtre de Genève, Teatro alla Scala in Milan, Teatro Comunale in Florence and Teatro Real in Madrid. He has appeared in the Salzburg Festival, Glyndebourne Opera Festival, and Aix-en-Provence Festival, and sung with De Nederlandse Opera.

== Awards ==
In 1983, Lopardo won first prize in the Liederkranz Foundation competition. He was awarded an honorary doctorate from Queens College, Aaron Copland School of Music, in 1992, and in 2005 won a Grammy Award for Best Choral Performance for a recording of the Berlioz Requiem, performed with the Atlanta Symphony Orchestra and Chorus and conducted by Robert Spano.

== Discography ==
- Requiem (Mozart), with Riccardo Muti. EMI Records, 1987
- L'italiana in Algeri (Rossini), with Claudio Abbado. Deutsche Grammophon, 1987
- Don Giovanni (Mozart), with Riccardo Muti. EMI Records, 1990
- Great Mass in C minor (Mozart), with Leonard Bernstein. Deutsche Grammophon, 1990
- Falstaff (Verdi), with Sir Colin Davis. BMG Music, 1991
- Il signor Bruschino (Rossini), with Ion Marin. Deutsche Grammophon, 1991
- Il barbiere di Siviglia (Rossini), with Claudio Abbado. Deutsche Grammophon, 1992
- Semiramide (Rossini), with Ion Marin. Deutsche Grammophon, 1992
- Carmina Burana (Orff), with André Previn. Deutsche Grammophon, 1992
- Don Pasquale (Donizetti), with Roberto Abbado. BMG Music, 1993
- Idomeneo (Mozart), with James Levine. Deutsche Grammophon, 1993
- Così fan tutte (Mozart), with Sir Georg Solti. Decca Records, 1993
- La traviata (Verdi), with (Sir Georg Solti). Decca Records, 1994
- Requiem (Berlioz), with Robert Spano. Telarc Records, 2003
- Imelda de' Lambertazzi (Donizetti), with Mark Elder. Opera Rara, 2006
- Ninth Symphony (Beethoven), with Franz Welser-Möst. Deutsche Grammophon, 2007

== Videography ==
- Great Mass in C minor (Mozart), with Leonard Bernstein, Deutsche Grammophon, 2006
