= St. Stephan, Baden =

St. Stephan
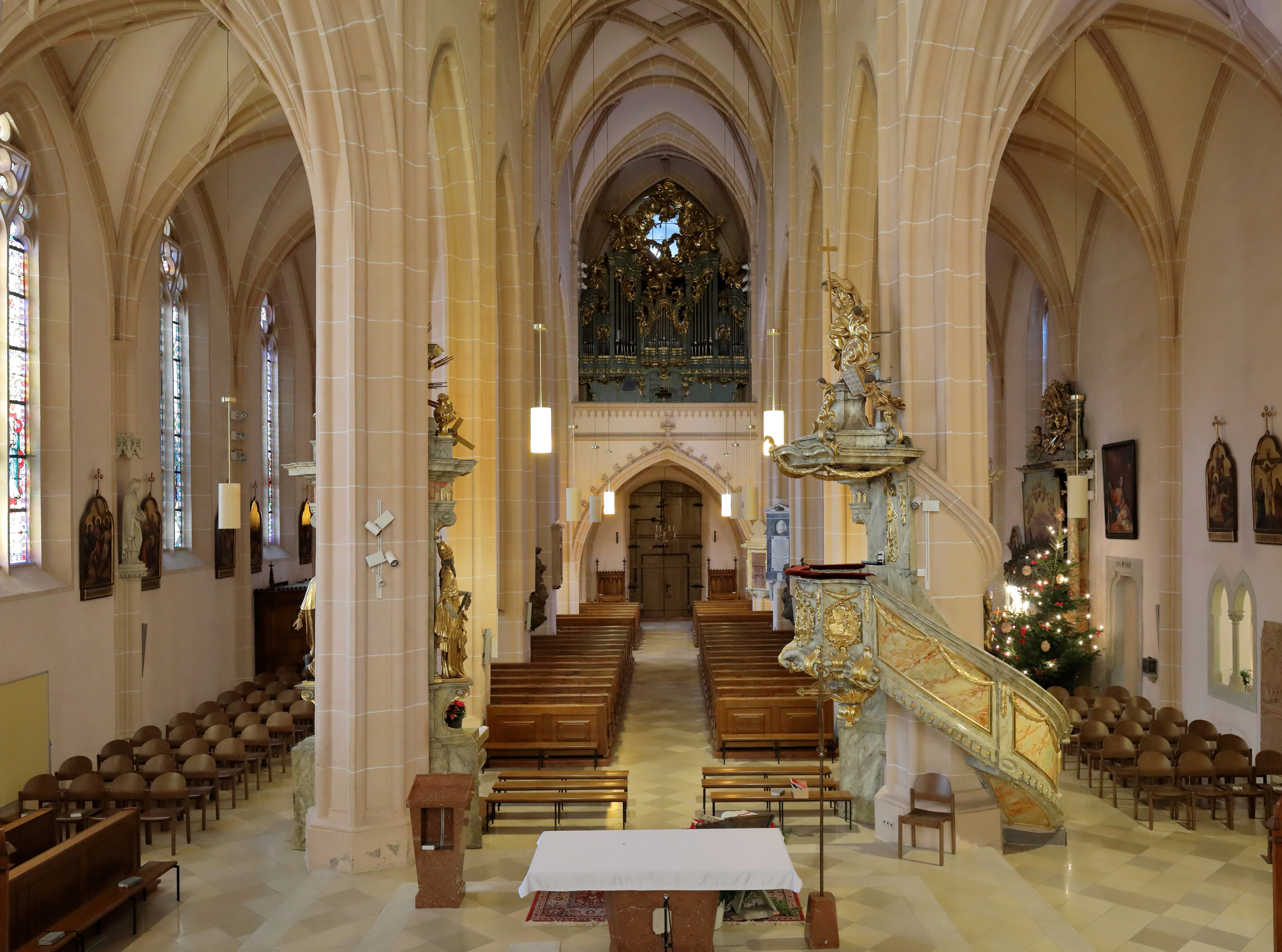
- Interior

- Location: Baden bei Wien
- Country: Austria
- Denomination: Roman Catholic
- Website: www.baden-st-stephan.at

History
- Dedication: St. Stephen

Architecture
- Functional status: Parish church
- Style: Gothic
- Completed: 15th century

Administration
- Diocese: Vienna
- Parish: St. Stephan

The church St. Stephan is a Catholic church in Baden in Lower Austria. The official name is Stadtpfarrkirche St. Stephan (municipal parish church). The present building began in Gothic style in the 15th century. It was remodeled Baroque in the 17th century, and an attempt made to restore Gothic features from 1880.

The church has a notable organ, played by Mozart and probably also Beethoven. Mozart's motet Ave verum corpus was premiered in St. Stephan in 1791. The church is a registered monument and an active parish church.

== History ==
The present building was begun c. 1400. A choir in Gothic style was built on the foundation of a Romanesque apsis. The nave was built in the second half of the 15th century, using the older walls. At the same time, the main steeple was built. Some epitaphs from the Renaissance were installed at columns in the church. The onion dome was added in 1697. As the church was badly damaged during Ottoman wars, its interior was changed to Baroque style, installing several altars. The new Hochaltar (high altar) in the choir with a painting by Paul Troger showing the stoning of St. Stephan. During the 18th century, some side altars were added, including the Sebastianaltar which was dedicated by the Baden citizens in 1731 to fight the plague. The Baroque furniture of the sacristy (Sakristeischrank) dates to 1743.

In 1880, the church interior was again changed, aiming at a revival of Gothic elements. The main altar was replaced by today's in 1893, while its painting was installed above an exit.

A postage stamp was issued in 2012 to commemorate the 700th anniversary of the parish.

== Organ ==
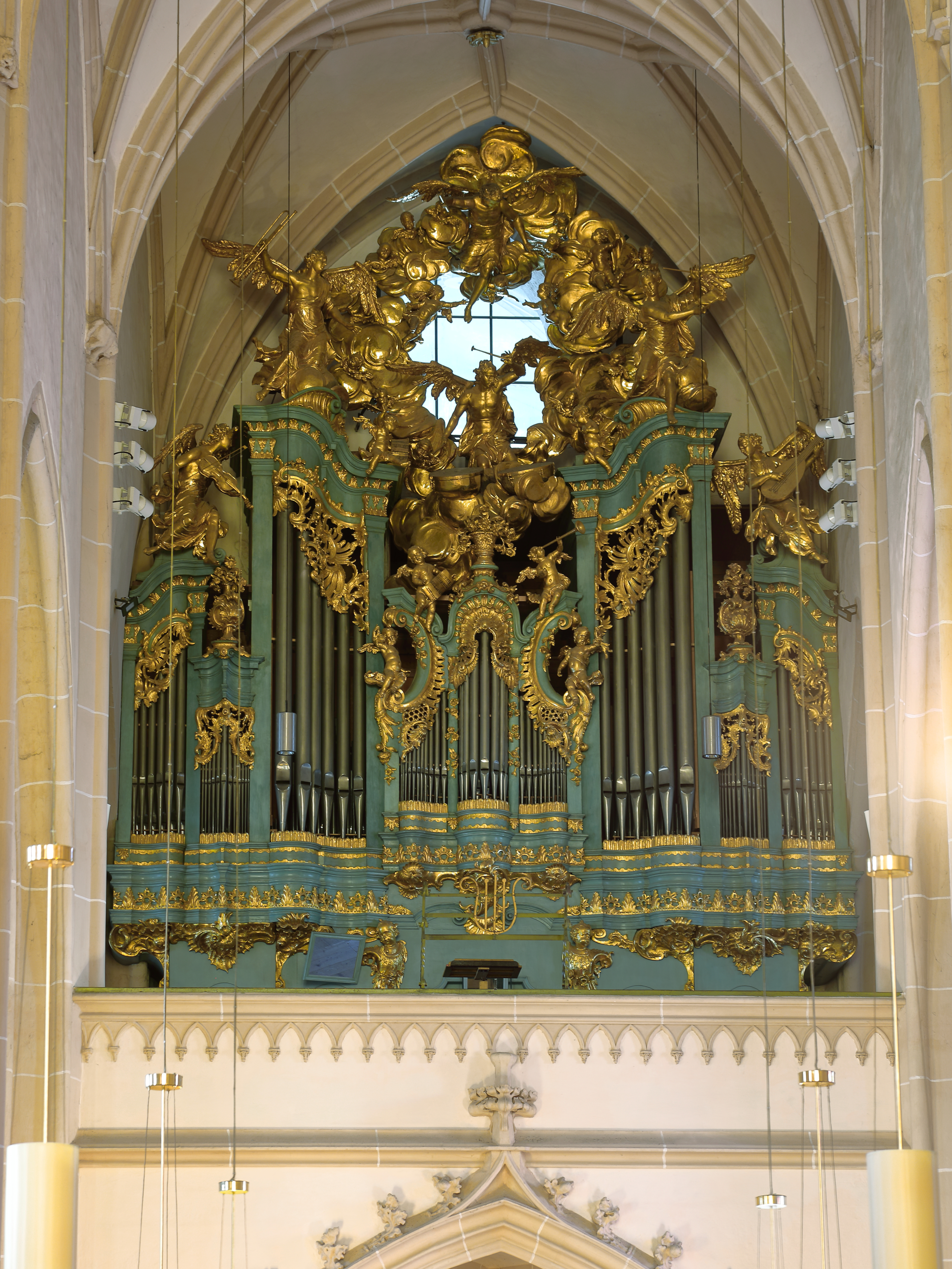
The Hencke Organ

The pipe organ was built in 1744 Johann Hencke, originally for the Dorotheerkirche in Vienna. It was moved to Baden in 1787. The organ has 28 stops, two manuals and pedal. It was restored in 1987 by Gerhard Hradetzky from Oberbergen, re-using keys which Mozart and probably also Beethoven played.

Mozart participated in several performances of his masses at the church and was a friend of the choral conductor Anton Stoll. On 17 June 1791, Mozart composed for Stoll the motet Ave verum corpus, K. 618, which was premiered by the church choir in St. Stephan. The musicologist Christoph Wolff assumes that it was performed probably on or around the feast Corpus Christi, on 22 June that year, and repeated at the Vienna Cathedral. Several masses by Mozart were performed at the church. He conducted his Missa brevis in B-Flat major, K. 275, on 10 July 1791.
