= Ave verum corpus (Mozart) =

Choral work by Wolfgang Amadeus Mozart

- Motet by W. A. Mozart
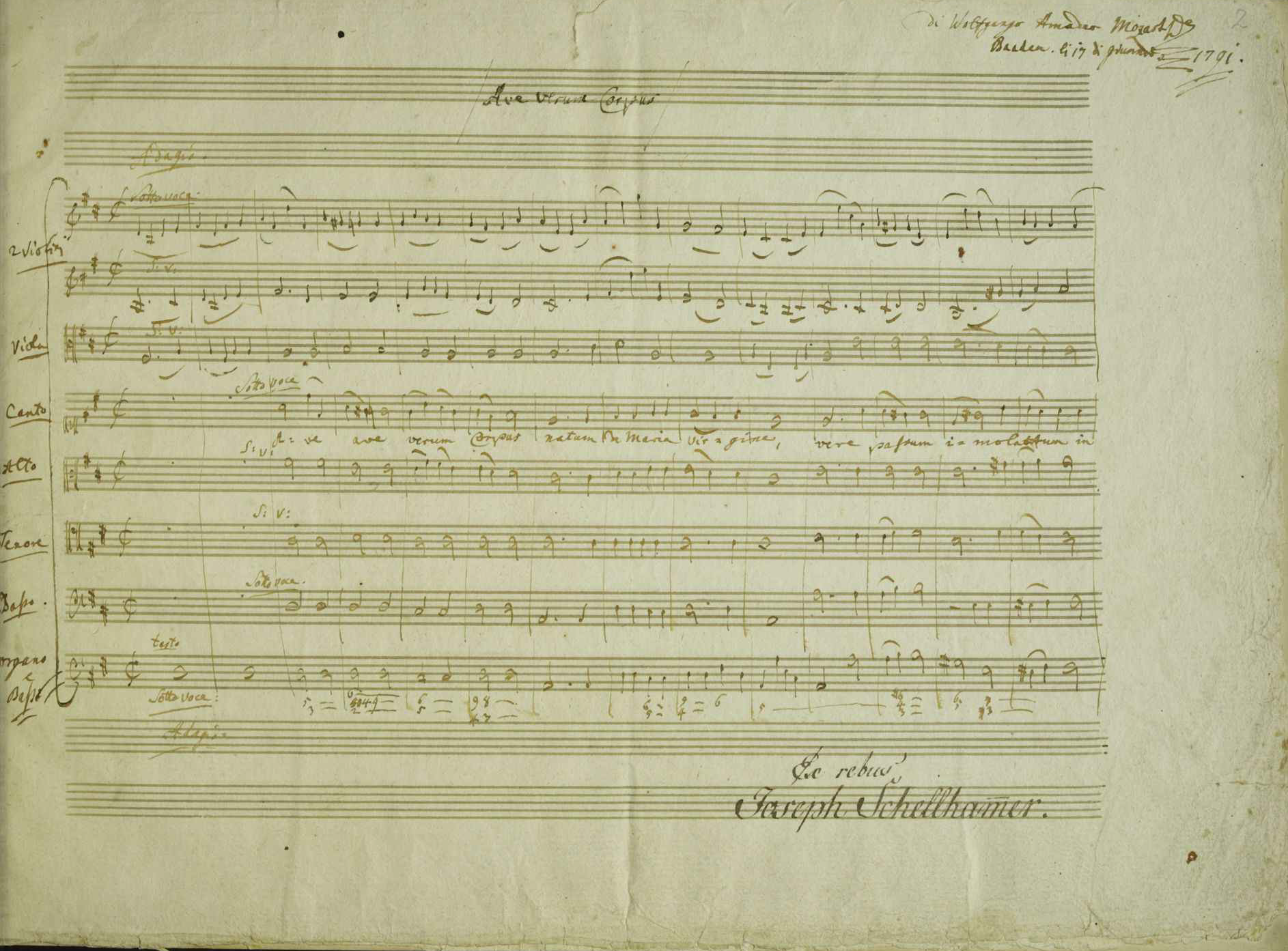
- Mozart's autograph of Ave verum corpus motet
- Key: D major
- Catalogue: K. 618
- Occasion: Feast of Corpus Christi
- Text: Ave verum corpus
- Language: Latin
- Composed: 17 June 1791: Baden bei Wien
- Vocal: SATB chorus
- Instrumental: strings; organ

Ave verum corpus ("Hail, True Body"), K. 618, is a motet in D major composed by Wolfgang Amadeus Mozart in 1791. It is a setting of the Latin hymn of the same name. Mozart wrote it for Anton Stoll, a friend who was the church musician of St. Stephan in Baden bei Wien. The motet was composed for the feast of Corpus Christi; the autograph is dated 17 June 1791. It is scored for SATB choir, string instruments and organ.

== History ==
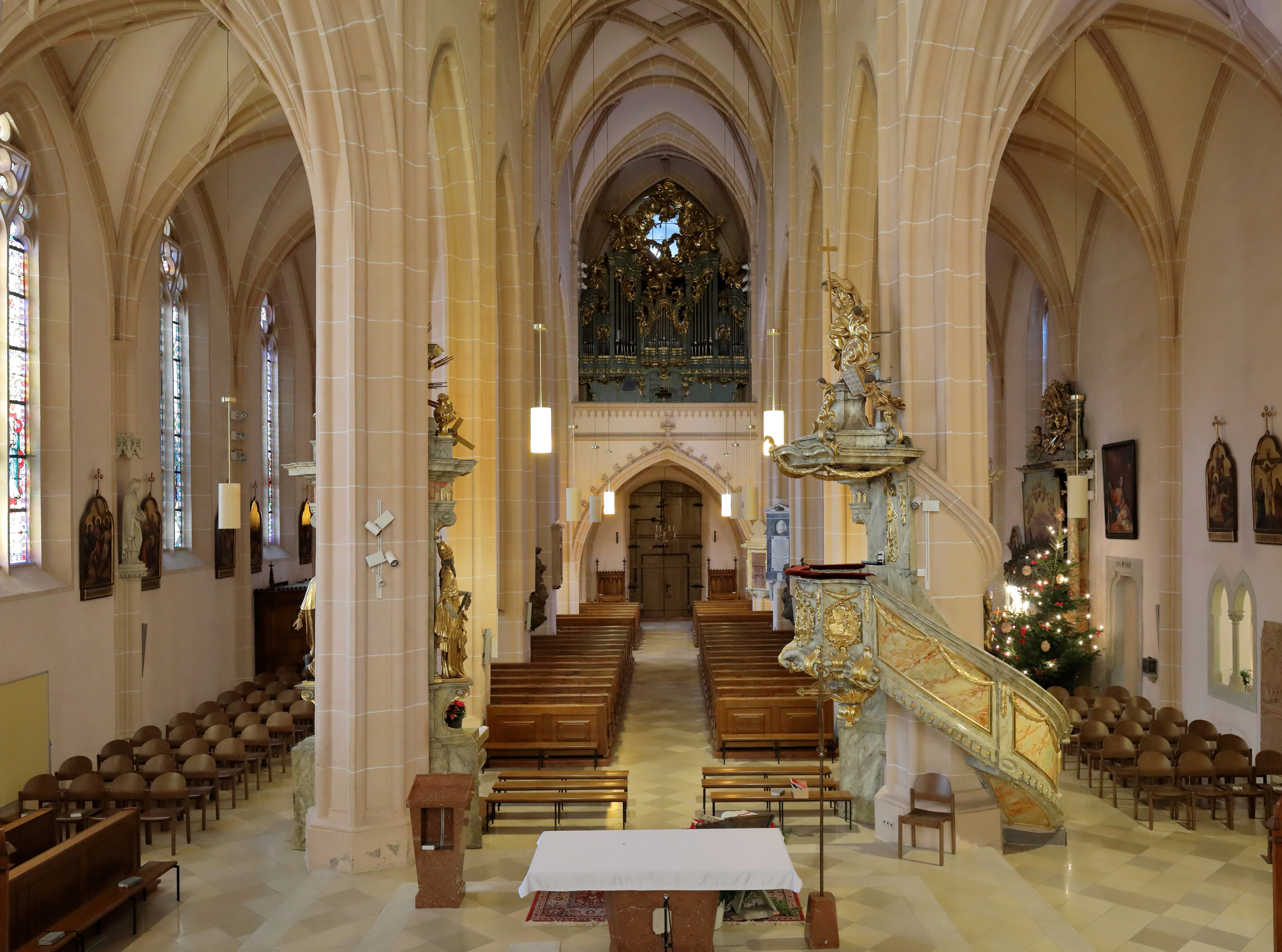
St. Stephan, Baden, the church for which Mozart composed the motet

Mozart composed the motet in 1791 in the middle of writing his opera Die Zauberflöte. He wrote it while visiting his wife Constanze, who was pregnant with their sixth child and staying in the spa Baden bei Wien. Mozart set the main verse of the 13th-century Latin Eucharist hymn "Ave verum corpus", omitting the last three lines. He wrote the motet for Anton Stoll (1747–1805), a friend of his. Stoll was the musical director of the parish St. Stephan, Baden. The setting was composed to celebrate the feast of Corpus Christi; the autograph is dated 17 June 1791; Mozart dated it in his personal catalogue on 18 June. (The feast of Corpus Christi falls on the Thursday following Trinity Sunday, and in 1791 was observed on 23 June.) The composition is only forty-six bars long and is scored for SATB choir, string instruments, and organ. Mozart's manuscript contains minimal directions, with only a single sotto voce marking at the beginning.

The motet was composed less than six months before Mozart's death. It foreshadows "aspects of the Requiem such as declamatory gesture, textures, and integration of forward- and backward-looking stylistic elements". While the Requiem is a dramatic composition, this motet is simpler in structure, suited for the church choir in a small town. It expresses Mozart's deeply held beliefs about the Eucharist; he uses chromatic and tonal harmonic structures to reflect on religious themes of death, salvation and communion.

Franz Liszt made transcriptions of Mozart's motet for piano solo (Searle 461a) and for organ (Searle 674d), and also quoted Mozart in his fantasie piece Evocation à la Chapelle Sixtine (Searle 461), in versions for piano, organ, orchestra, and piano duet. Pyotr Ilyich Tchaikovsky incorporates an orchestration of Liszt's transcription in his fourth orchestral suite, Mozartiana, Op. 61; a tribute to Mozart's music.

== Melody ==
The beginning of the melody is as follows:

== Recording ==
Ave verum corpus
Performed by the Senftenberg Orchestra and Chorus

- On Great Mass in C minor, K. 427, Bavarian Radio Symphony Orchestra and Chorus, conducted by Leonard Bernstein, Deutsche Grammophon CD 431-791-2 (1991) and DVD 00440-073-4240 (2006)
