= Wolfgang Seeliger =

German choral conductor

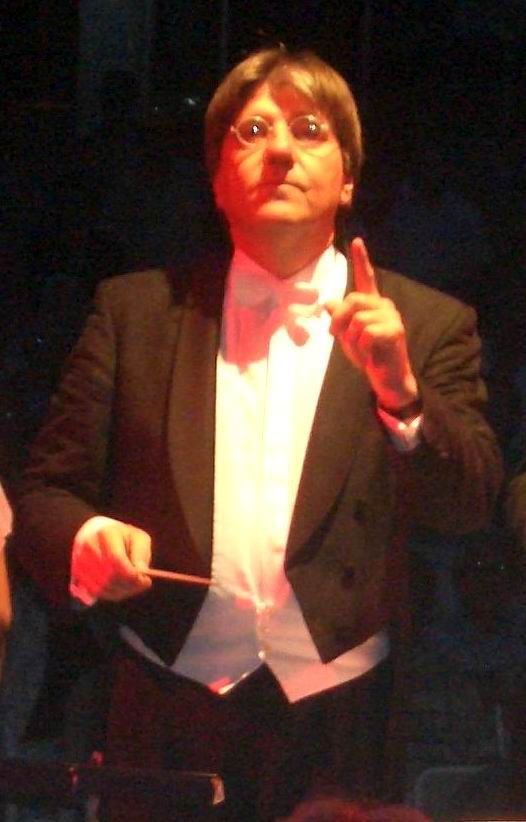
Wolfgang Seeliger

Wolfgang Seeliger (Heidelberg, May 30, 1946) is a German choral conductor. With his Konzertchor Darmstadt he won the EBU Let the Peoples Sing prize in 1991, and he himself was awarded the Goethe-Plakette des Landes Hessen in 2006.

== Selected discography ==
For Christophorus (record label)

- Max Bruch: Lieder für gemischten Chor, Konzertchor Darmstadt, Wolfgang Seeliger 2 CDs
- Johannes Brahms: 26 Deutsche Volkslieder, Konzertchor Darmstadt, Seeliger
- Kantaten & Lieder zur Weihnacht, Barbara Schlick, Konzertchor & Kammerorchester Darmstadt, Seeliger
- Telemann: Matthäus-Passion (1746), Maria Zedelius, Browner, Blochwitz, Scharinger, Kammerorchester Darmstadt, Seeliger
- Carl Amand Mangold: Abraham 2CDs
