= Waldsassen Abbey =

Monastery in Bavaria, Germany

- Abtei Waldsassen
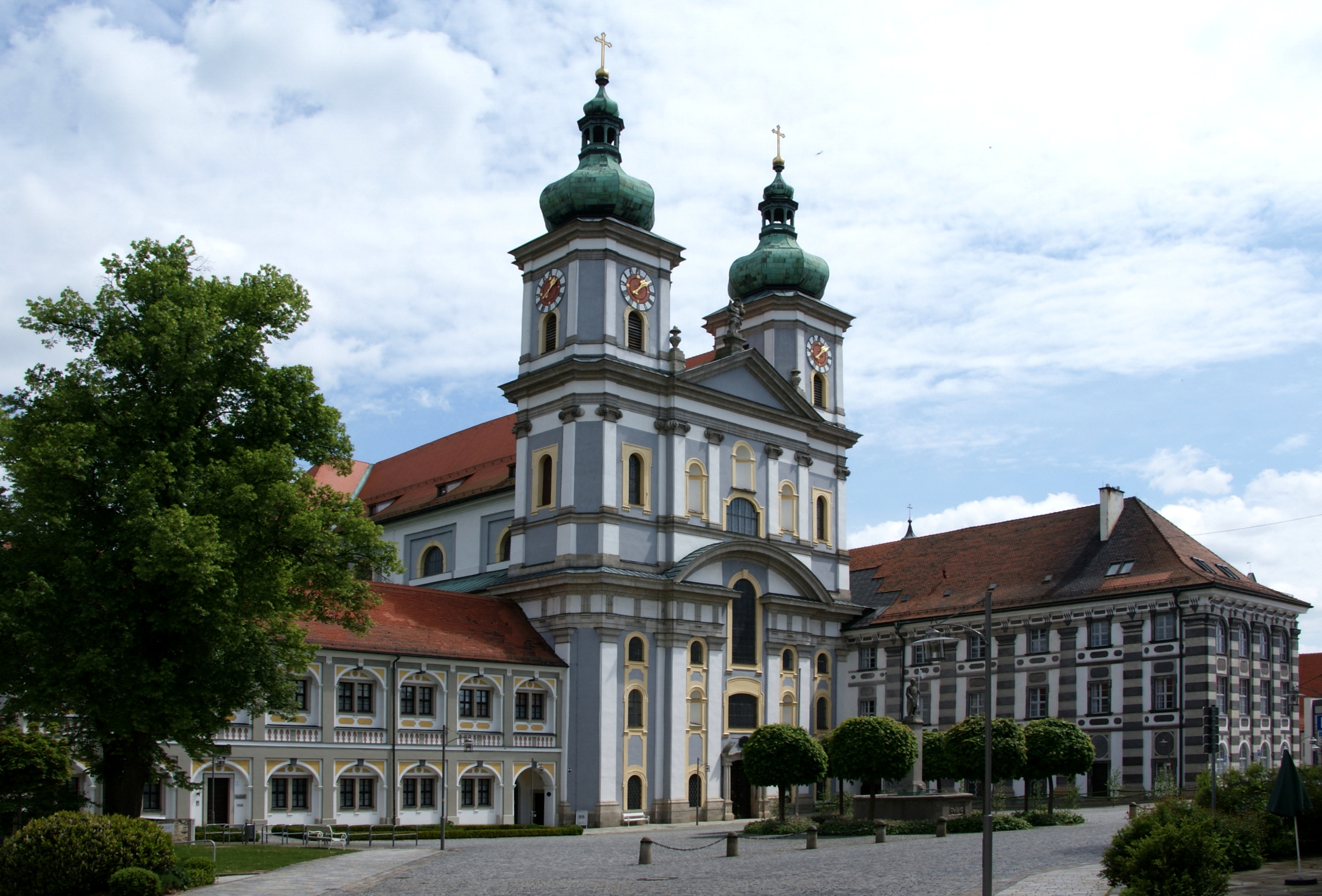
- The basilica of Waldsassen

- Location within Germany
- Interactive map of Waldsassen Abbey

Monastery information
- Order: Cistercian
- Established: 12th century 1863
- Disestablished: 1803

Site
- Location: Waldsassen, Germany
- Coordinates: 50°0′14″N 12°18′34″E
- Public access: partial

Waldsassen Abbey (German: Abtei Waldsassen) is a Cistercian nunnery, formerly a Cistercian monastery, located on the River Wondreb at Waldsassen near Tirschenreuth, Oberpfalz, in Bavaria, Germany, close to the border with the Czech Republic. In the Holy Roman Empire it was an Imperial Abbey.

== History ==
=== First foundation ===
The monastery, the first Cistercian foundation in Bavaria, was founded by Gerwich of Wolmundstein, a Benedictine monk of Sigeberg Abbey, with the permission of his former abbot Kuno, then Bishop of Regensburg, and built between 1128 and 1132. The original community was sent to Waldsassen from Volkenroda Abbey in Thuringia, of the line of Morimond Abbey.

The first abbot was elected in 1133, making this one of the earliest Cistercian foundations.

Imperial Abbey of Waldsassen Reichsabtei Waldsassen
- 1147–1543
- Coat of arms
- Status: Imperial Abbey
- Capital: Waldsassen
- Historical era: Middle Ages
  - Abbey founded: 1128–32
  - Gained Reichsfreiheit: 1147
  - Mediatised to Electorate of the Palatinate: 1543
  - Secularised to Bavaria: 1803
Preceded by	Succeeded by
Electorate of the Palatinate	Electorate of the Palatinate

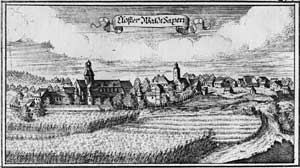
Waldsassen Abbey. Engraving by Johann Ulrich Kraus from the Churbaierische Atlas of Anton Wilhelm Ertl, 1687

Soon the abbey became one of the most renowned and powerful of the times. As the number of monks increased, several important foundations were made at Senftenberg and Osek in Bohemia, at Walderbach, near Regensburg, and in other places. In 1147, Conrad III, King of Germany, granted it reichsunmittelbar status, making it an Imperial abbey. Several of its thirty-seven abbots up to the Reformation were noted for sanctity and learning; of them, Herman, the seventh abbot, and John, the seventeenth, as well as Gerwich, its founder, and Wigand, the first prior, are commemorated in the menology.

From the middle of the 14th century, Waldsassen alternated between periods of prosperity and decline. Wars, famines, excessive taxation, and persecution by the Hussites made it suffer much. During the Bavarian War (1504) the monastery, church, and farm-buildings were burned, but immediately afterwards rebuilt, and the new church was consecrated in 1517.

In 1525, during the German Peasants' War, part of the buildings were again destroyed, and were restored by Georg III (1531–37), the last of the first series of abbots.

From 1537 to 1560 in the course of the Reformation administrators were appointed by the civil authorities: Frederick III, Elector Palatine, named his brother Richard for this office. The monks were then forced to apostatize or flee, or were put to death. As a result, in 1543, the abbey lost its imperial immediacy to the Electorate of the Palatinate. For about a hundred years it remained in this condition, during which time it was almost completely burned down in the Thirty Years' War.

After the Peace of Westphalia Roman Catholicism was restored in Bavaria. In 1669, Waldsassen was restored to the Cistercians, and in 1690 Albrecht, first of the second series of abbots (who were six in number), was elected, regaining control of the abbey, but not its imperial immediacy.

The buildings were sumptuously rebuilt in Baroque style after 1681 and the number of the monks again became considerable.

The abbey became well known for its hospitality, particularly during the famines of 1702–03 and 1772–73, and during the French Revolution. Under Abbot Athanasius (1793–1803) science and learning were highly cultivated.

When the monastery was dissolved and secularised under the Reichsdeputationshauptschluss of 1803 it had over eighty members, who were dispersed with state pensions from the Electorate of Bavaria.

The abbey was sold, and used as a factory for making cotton.

=== Second foundation ===
In 1864, the remains of the old abbey were bought by the Cistercian nuns of Floh-Seligenthal, who in the following year took possession, established monastic enclosure, and opened a school for the education of girls.

At first a priory, the nunnery was raised to the status of an abbey in 1925. The Stiftsbasilika was declared a basilica minor in 1969.

== The library of the abbey ==
The library was built in 1724–6 in late Baroque and early Rococo style. Richly and intricately carved shelves hold thousands of volumes bound in white pigskin and dark calfskin. Ten carved columns support a balustraded mezzanine with more shelves above. These ten columns are carved in the shape of allegorical figures around book production: rag picker, pigskin maker, bookbinder, author, bookseller, critic... grotesque men bent under their burden of supporting the mezzanine level but also burdened by human foibles of their profession such as vanity, ignorance and boastfulness. The lindenwood carvings were completed by Karl Stilp, a local sculptor, in 1725. The library also features a painted ceiling and ornamental plaster work. The painter Karl Hofreiter worked on the interiors.

The library hall is maintained by nuns of the Cistercian Sisterhood. Part of the former monastic premises now accommodates an International Ceramics Museum.

Interior of the basilica

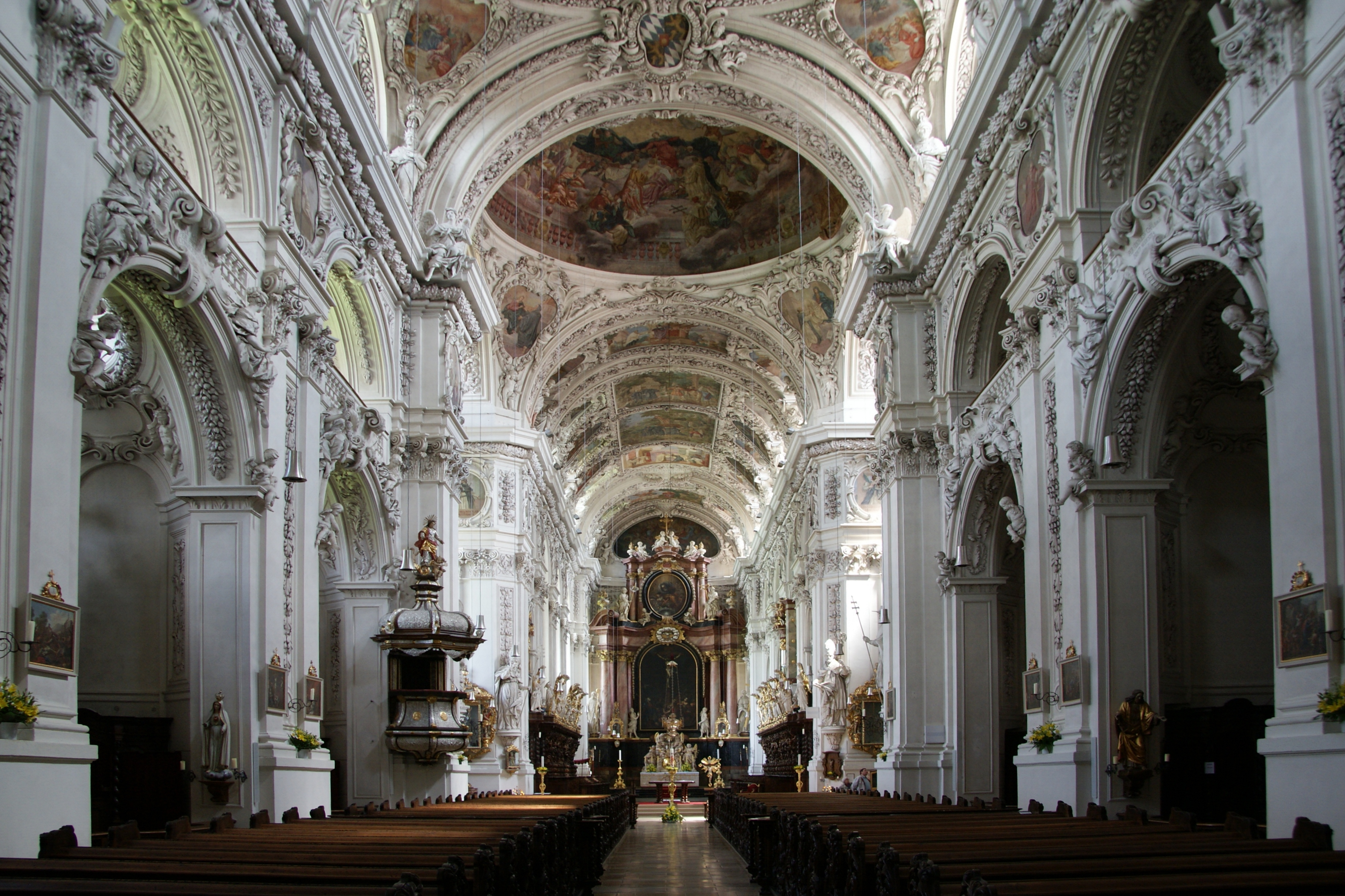

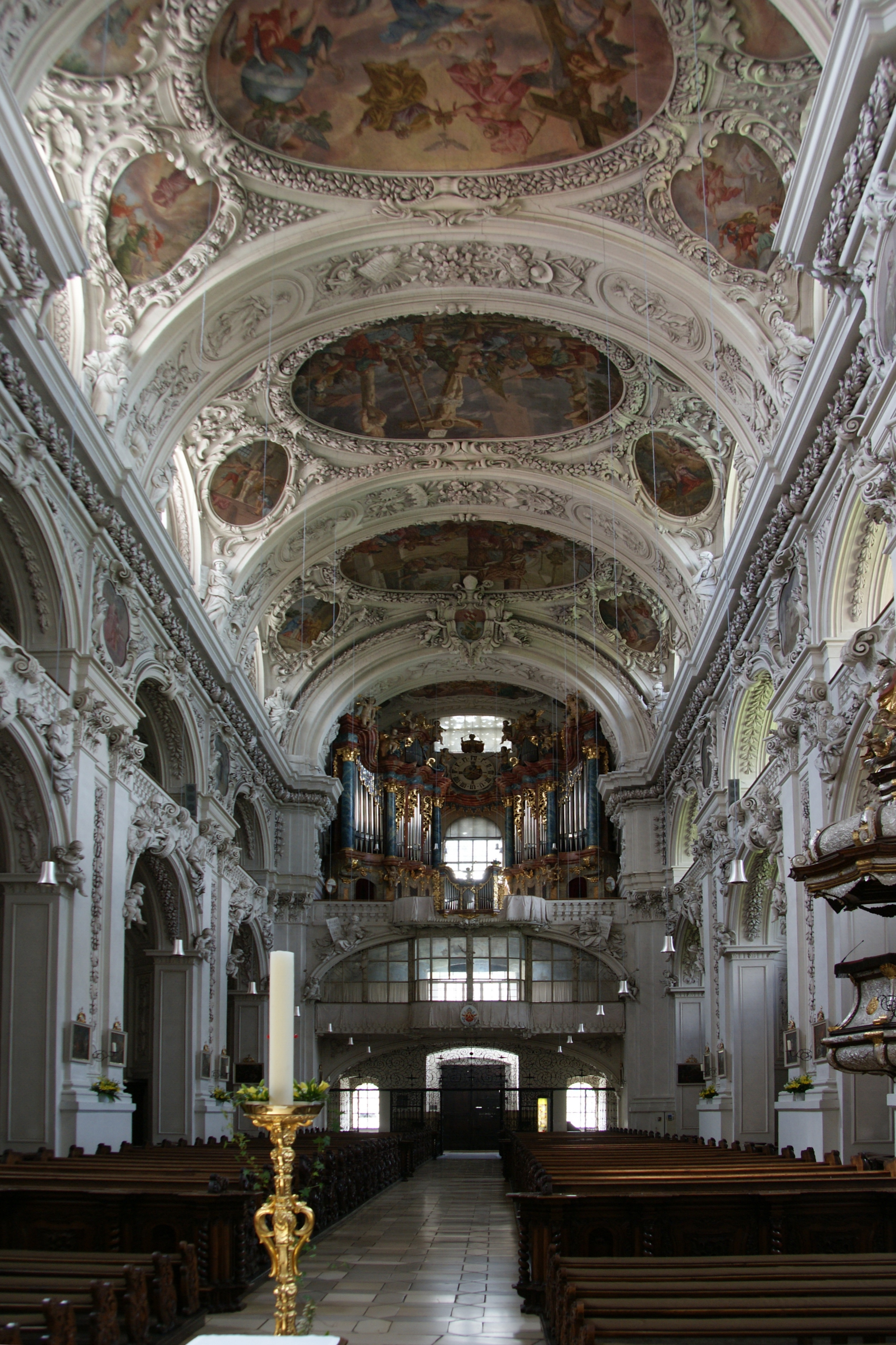

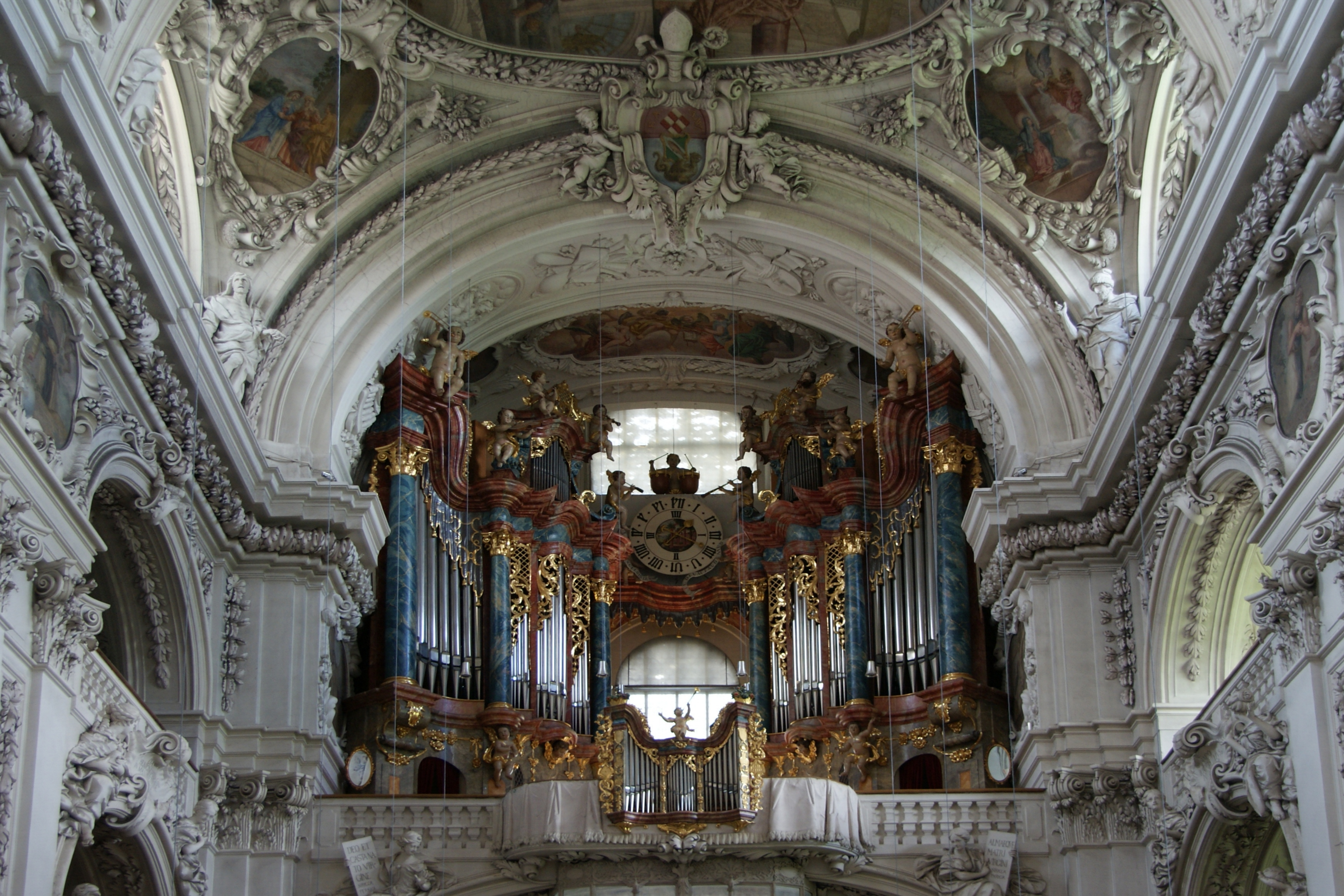

== See also ==
- Stiftsbasilika Waldsassen
