= Orchestral Suite No. 4 Mozartiana (Tchaikovsky) =

1887 orchestral suite by P. I. Tchaikovsky

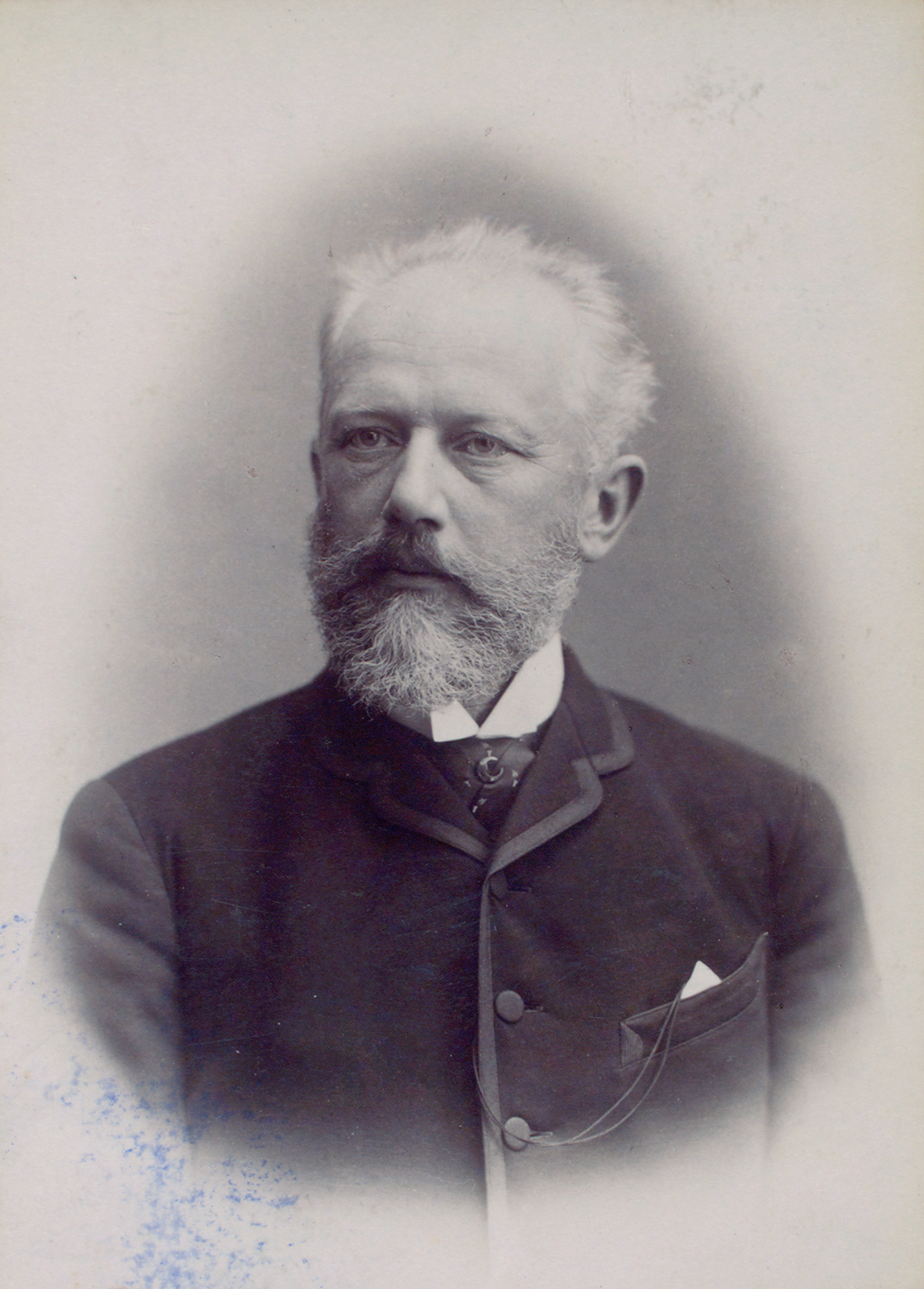
Pyotr Ilyich Tchaikovsky, c. 1888

The Orchestral Suite No. 4, Mozartiana, Op. 61, is an orchestral suite by Pyotr Ilyich Tchaikovsky, written in 1887 as a tribute to Wolfgang Amadeus Mozart on the 100th anniversary of that composer's opera Don Giovanni. Because this suite consists of four orchestrations of piano pieces by (or in one case, based on) Mozart, Tchaikovsky did not number this suite with his previous three suites for orchestra. Instead, he considered it a separate work entitled Mozartiana. Nevertheless, it is usually counted as No. 4 of his orchestral suites.

Tchaikovsky conducted the premiere himself, in Moscow in November 1887. It was the only one of his suites he conducted, and only the second at whose premiere he was present.

== Music ==
This suite is scored for pairs of flutes, oboes, clarinets, bassoons and trumpets, four horns, timpani, cymbals, glockenspiel, harp, and strings.

Mozartiana is in four movements and lasts approximately 20 minutes.

1. Gigue. Allegro (G major)
  After the Little Gigue for Piano, K. 574
2. Menuet. Moderato (D major)
  After the Minuet for Piano, K. 355
3. Preghiera. Andante ma non tanto (B♭ major)
  After Franz Liszt's piano transcription of the Ave verum corpus, K. 618. (In 1862 Liszt wrote a piano transcription combining Gregorio Allegri's Miserere and Mozart's Ave verum corpus, published as À la Chapelle Sixtine (S.461). Tchaikovsky orchestrated only the part of this work that had been based on Mozart.)
4. Thème et variations. Allegro giusto (G major)
  After the Piano Variations on a Theme by Gluck, K. 455. (The theme was the aria "Unser dummer Pöbel meint" from Gluck's opera La Rencontre imprévue, ou Les Pèlerins de la Mecque).

== Overview ==
Tchaikovsky's treatment of Mozart's work here was both faithful and, as David Brown phrases it, "affectionate". He took the music as it stood and endeavoured to present it in the best possible light—this is, in late 19th-century guise. His intent was to win greater appreciation among his contemporaries for Mozart's lesser-known works.

Tchaikovsky had always held Don Giovanni in the greatest awe and regarded Mozart as his musical god. The great soprano Pauline Viardot-Garcia, who was the teacher of Tchaikovsky's one-time unofficial fiancée Désirée Artôt (and whom she may have persuaded not to go through with her plan to marry the composer), had purchased the manuscript of the opera in 1855 in London and kept it in a shrine in her home, where it was visited by many people. Tchaikovsky visited her when he was in Paris in June 1886, and said that when looking at the manuscript, he was "in the presence of divinity". So it is not surprising that the centenary of the opera in 1887 would inspire him to write something honouring Mozart. (Curiously, the title role in the centenary production of Don Giovanni in Prague was sung by the man who replaced Tchaikovsky in Désirée Artôt's affections, her husband, the Spanish baritone Mariano Padilla y Ramos.) Tchaikovsky wrote the work in the summer of 1887 at a spa town in the Caucasus where he went to cure a supposed liver complaint.

Tchaikovsky had hoped in Mozartiana to recreate "the past in a contemporary world", as he wrote his publisher P. Jurgenson. However, he never did rework the music in his own style as did Stravinsky, or do anything to enhance Mozart's music. The one movement that posterity has viewed as falling short of Tchaikovsky's goal was the third, the Preghiera. Tchaikovsky was not working directly from a Mozart text but from Liszt's idiosyncratic treatment of Mozart's music in À la Chapelle Sixtine. The result is generally regarded today as too sentimental and lush a treatment of Mozart's ethereal and tender original.

Also, while the gigue and minuet are effectively scored, Tchaikovsky's choice of them for his opening movements suggests that like many of his contemporaries he failed to make enough distinction between Mozart's lighter and more profound sides. The final variations are more successful, as he can indulge in colorful scoring which characterized in Tchaikovsky's manner some aspects Mozart explored with this theme. Even then, Mozart appears to represent the prettiness of the baroque rather than something deeper. Tchaikovsky's apparent inability to see the real power and variety of Mozart's music may have been part of his psychological need to regard the past with wistfulness and associate it with lost purity and felicity. This inevitably committed him to a view that proved merely sentimental.

== Legacy ==
A number of later composers have titled pieces ending in -ana or -iana, as a way of paying tribute to other composers or performers. For a comprehensive list, see -ana.

George Balanchine's 1981 ballet Mozartiana is set to Tchaikovsky's work.
