= Waldsassen =

- Town
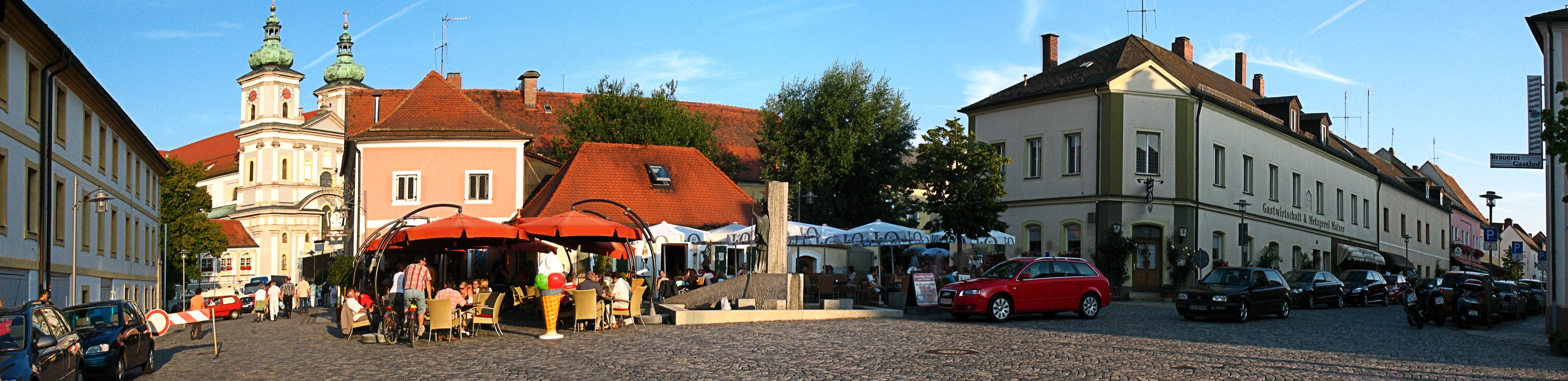
- Market square and basilica

- Coat of arms

- Location of Waldsassen within Tirschenreuth district
- Interactive map of Waldsassen
- Location within Germany Location within Bavaria
- Coordinates: 50°0′N 12°18′E
- Country: Germany
- State: Bavaria
- Admin. region: Oberpfalz
- District: Tirschenreuth

Government
  - Mayor (2020–26): Bernd Sommer (CSU)

Area
  - Total: 66.53 km^{2} (25.69 sq mi)
- Elevation: 477 m (1,565 ft)

Population (2025-12-31)
  - Total: 6,679
  - Density: 100.4/km^{2} (260.0/sq mi)
- Time zone: UTC+01:00 (CET)
  - Summer (DST): UTC+02:00 (CEST)
- Postal codes: 95652
- Dialling codes: 09632
- Vehicle registration: TIR
- Website: www.waldsassen.de

Waldsassen (German pronunciation: [valtˈzasn̩]; Northern Bavarian: Woidsassen; Czech: Valdsasy) is a town in the district of Tirschenreuth in the Upper Palatinate region of Bavaria.

== Geography ==
Waldsassen is the northernmost municipality of the Upper Palatinate region. In the northeast, it borders the town of Cheb (Eger) in the Czech Republic. The historic tripoint of ducal Altbayern, the Franconian lands of Bayreuth, and the Bohemian Egerland lies near the village of Pechtnersreuth.

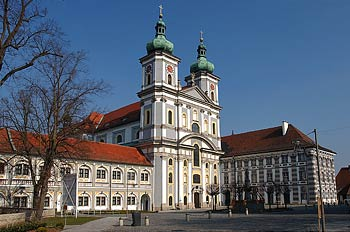
Waldsassen Basilica

The town is famous for the Waldsassen Basilica and Waldsassen Abbey, both built in a Baroque style. The latter contains the much visited Abbey library, whose wood carvings were completed by Karl Stilp in 1726. Four km north of the town, on Glasberg hill, is the Chapel of the Trinity (Dreifaltigkeitskirche Kappl), built in 1689, and a popular pilgrimage destination because of its quirky architecture.

== History ==
The Cistercian Waldsassen Abbey was founded on 1 October 1133 by the Bavarian noble Margrave Diepold III of Vohburg. An Imperial abbey from 1214 onwards, it fell to Palatinate-Mosbach-Neumarkt branch of the House of Wittelsbach under the rule of Count Palatine Otto II in 1465.

The Palatinate rulers had the monastery dissolved in the course of the Protestant Reformation in 1571, whereafter the premises were used as tenements. Not until the 17th century new building arose in the vicinity, while after the Counter-Reformation, the abbey from 1661 onwards was resettled with Cistercian monks descending from Fürstenfeld Abbey. However, Waldsassen again was secularised during the 1803 German Mediatisation.

Part of the Kingdom of Bavaria from 1806, the local economy, mainly porcelain and glassblowing industries, was boosted by the opening of the Wiesau–Cheb railway line in 1865. Prince Regent Luitpold vested Waldsassen with city rights in 1896. The monastery again became a priory of Cistercian nuns in 1863 and again achieved the status of an independent abbey in 1925. The monastery church received the papal title of basilica minor in 1969.

== Politics ==
Seats in the town's assembly (Stadtrat) as of 2014 local elections:

- Christian Social Union in Bavaria (CSU): 10
- Social Democratic Party of Germany (SPD): 7
- Free Voters (FWG): 3

== Twin towns ==
Waldsassen is twinned with:

- Marcoussis, France, since 1970
- Pencoed, Wales, United Kingdom, since 1982

== Notable people ==
- Robert Köbler (1912–1970), pianist, organist and composer
- Matthias Hamann (born 1968), football player and manager
- Dietmar Hamann (born 1973), footballer
