= Ernestine von Pfeffel =

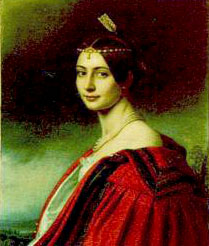
- Born: Baroness Ernestine von Pfeffel; 1810
- Died: 1894 (aged 83–84)
- Buried: Novodevichy Cemetery, St. Petersburg
- Noble family: Pfeffel
- Spouses: 1. Friedrich von Dörnberg (m. 1830; died 1833); 2. Fyodor Tyutchev (m. 1839; died 1873)
- Issue: Maria Fedorovna; Dmitry Fedorovich; Ivan Fedorovich
- Father: Baron Christian Hubert von Pfeffel
- Mother: Baroness Caroline von Tettenborn
- Occupation: Writer

Baroness Ernestine von Pfeffel (1810–1894), was the second wife of the poet Fyodor Tyutchev.

== Biography ==
Born to Christian Hubert von Pfeffel (1765–1834), Bavarian diplomat and ambassador to London and Paris, and his wife, Caroline née Baroness von Tettenborn (1789–1811). Her paternal grandfather was Alsatian historian, lawyer and diplomat Christian Friedrich Pfeffel von Kriegelstein (1726–1807). She was a grandniece of famous French-German writer and translator Gottlieb Konrad Pfeffel (1736–1809). After her mother's early death, her father married the children's governess. Ernestine was brought up in a Parisian boarding school.

In September 1830, Ernestine married diplomat Friedrich von Dörnberg (1796–1833) in Paris, (where her father headed the Bavarian Embassy). Shortly before her husband's death in 1833, she met the Russian diplomat Fyodor Tyutchev at a ball in Munich through her brother Karl, who was a son-in-law of Paul of Württemberg (and ancestor of Boris Johnson).

Despite having a wife (Eleonora Fyodorovna), the poet began to court the young widow, dedicating at least eight of his poems to her. Their relationship caused tension within the poet's family, resulting in his wife attempting suicide in May 1836. To avoid controversy, Tyutchev was exiled to Turin, where Ernestine followed him. However, Eleonora died soon after the move in 1838. In December of the same year, Tyutchev proposed to her. They married on 17 July 1839 in Bern. Tyutchev had three daughters from his first marriage, Anna, Daria, and Ekaterina, whom Ernestine adopted.

Ernestne was a rich woman, and it was no secret that Tyutchev lived on her money. She was considered a beauty and her portrait was painted by the court painter Joseph Karl Stieler. Regardless, in the 1850's, Tyutchev began a relationship with Elena Deniseva and began a second family. After Deniseva's death, 14 years later, Fyodor reconciled with his wife and died in her arms.

== Issue ==
- Maria Fedorovna (1840–1873) married Nikolai Alexeevich Birilev (1829–1882) in 1865.
- Dmitry Fedorovich (1841–1870) married Olga Alexandrovna Melnikova (1830–1913) who was the niece of the Minister of Railways Pavel Petrovich Melnikov
- Ivan Fedorovich (1846–1909) married Olga Petrovna Putyata (1840–1920) in 1869 who was the granddaughter of Lev Nikolaevich Engelhardt, and daughter of Nikolai Vasilyevich Putyata

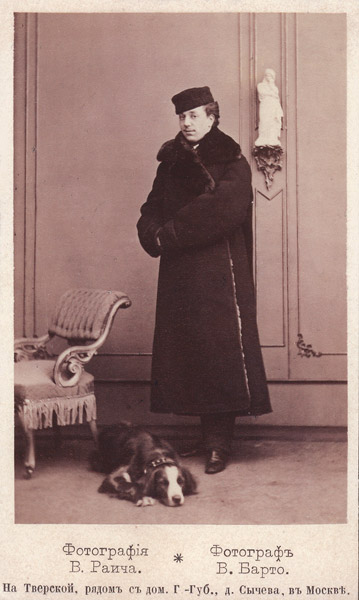
Ivan Fedorovich Tyutchev, 1867
