= Piano Trio No. 45 (Haydn) =

1797 composition by Joseph Haydn

Portrait of Haydn by Thomas Hardy (1791)

Joseph Haydn's Piano Trio No. 45 in E♭ major, Hob. XV:29, was published in 1797 but may have been written a few years earlier, while Haydn was still in England on the second of his highly successful London visits. It is the third piano trio of a set of three dedicated to the eminent pianist Therese Jansen Bartolozzi. It is the least technically sophisticated of the three in a set noted in general for their wide expressive range and virtuosity—piano trios at this time were typically written with amateur performers in mind. But it is still full of character and humour.

The trio is in three movements.

1. Poco allegretto
2. Andantino ed innocentemente
3. Finale. Allemande. Presto assai

Instead of the expected strict sonata form, this march-like E♭ major first movement is cast in A–B–A form, with the B section a version of the main theme in E♭ minor, and the returning A section incorporating variations. There is an extended coda that leads into some remote modulations before a confident return to the home key.

The second, brief movement in the key of B major with the theme first heard on the piano, then on violin, and then in canon. After a key change back to E♭, the music finishes in suspense on the dominant chord, making its function more of a long introduction to the third movement rather than a separate movement.

Following without a break, this is a triple-time dance in the vernacular German style, using a ländler folk melody for its main material (as is made clear in the original title). Hints of gypsy fiddles and the hurdy gurdy alternate with more serious material.

== See also ==
- Piano Trio No. 43
- Piano Trio No. 44
- List of piano trios by Joseph Haydn
