= Piano Trio No. 41 (Haydn) =

Piano trio by Joseph Haydn

Portrait of Haydn by Thomas Hardy (1791)

Joseph Haydn's Piano Trio No. 41 in E-flat minor, Hob. XV:31, was written in 1795/1796, though not published until 1803 in Vienna. It has the nickname "Jacob's Dream" because of its second movement. On publication it was dedicated to Magdalena von Kurzböck (1767–1845), a Viennese pianist and composer.

The trio is in two movements, which were composed in reverse order: the second in 1795 and the first a year later:

1. Andante cantabile
2. Allegro (ben moderato)

The long and contemplative first movement combines the features of variations and rondo. It is notable for its use of piano chords deep in the bass register, influenced by the sonorous English pianos Haydn came to appreciate while in London.

The short and cheerful second movement (in sharp contrast to the first) has the scheme A–B–A–Coda. Unusually, the violin takes a more important role than the piano. The nickname "Jacob's Dream" comes from Haydn's inscription on the original manuscript, later removed. This reads: Jacob's Dream! by Dr. Haydn. It refers to the biblical story of Jacob's Ladder ascending to heaven, as the movement features difficult passages in the upper register of the violin. Haydn intended this as a practical joke directed at a German violinist who had particular difficulties playing high notes. Haydn sent the movement to the pianist Therese Jansen who played it with the violinist, to comic effect.

== See also ==
- List of piano trios by Joseph Haydn
- Haydn and folk music
