= Piano Trio No. 44 (Haydn) =

Composition by Joseph Haydn

Portrait of Haydn by Thomas Hardy (1791)

Joseph Haydn's Piano Trio No. 44 in E major, Hob. XV/28, was published in 1797 but may have been written a few years earlier while Haydn was still in England on the second of his highly successful London visits. It is the second of a set of three piano trios dedicated to the eminent pianist Therese Jansen Bartolozzi, and (like the others in the set) is noted for its especially wide expressive range as well as its virtuosity.

The trio is in three movements:

1. Allegro moderato
2. Allegretto
3. Finale: Allegro

The first movement opens with an ascending theme presented, untypically, by the violin and cello in pizzicato; the effect is reminiscent of a harp. The piano answers with an ornamented legato version of the same theme, before all three instruments burst into a lively bridge section leading toward the dominant. The opening theme is reproduced in the development section in a rich, full-bodied version in A♭ major.

Set in the tonic minor, the second movement is in essence in the form of a passacaglia, being set to an ostinato bass, which is varied through the movement, though only subtly. Its creeping bass line is first introduced by all three instruments in unison, before the piano introduces a winding, ornamental melody over the top of it. Later, the melody and bass are used in invertible counterpoint. This movement has numerous features that link it with the second movement of J. S. Bach's Italian Concerto.

The lively triple-time finale introduces a theme in short phrases, with a playfulness both in its rhythms and in its irregular length. The violin takes over in the minor-mode middle section, which includes an extraordinary modulation to E♭ minor, while the return of the opening material is accompanied by changes in register, and the action is temporarily suspended by several diminished seventh chords before the music comes to a close.

== See also ==
- List of piano trios by Joseph Haydn
- Piano Trio No. 43, first of the Bartolozzi trios
- Piano Trio No. 45, third of the Bartolozzi trios
