= Piano Trio No. 38 (Haydn) =

1795 composition by Joseph Haydn

Portrait of Haydn by Thomas Hardy (1791)

Joseph Haydn's Piano Trio No. 38 in D major, Hob. XV:24, was written in 1795, during Haydn's second trip to London, and one of a set of three (H. XV:24–26) dedicated to Haydn's friend, the widow Rebecca Schroeter. According to Robert Philip, this work is unusual compared with other later piano trios in that it is serious in tone throughout, "with almost Beethoven-like earnestness". The style of piano writing, with its rich chords, octaves in the bass and lively elaboration in the right hand, was much influenced by the sonorous English pianos Haydn came to appreciate while in London.

== Structure ==
The trio is in three movements.

1. Allegro
2. Andante
3. Allegro, ma dolce

The first movement is a large-scale movement full of rhetorically dramatic pauses, changes of mood and unexpected accents. The second is a brief and solemn dance, based around an insistent baroque-style dotted rhythm figure. It leads into the finale without a break. The finale is a grave minuet-like movement with the triple time rhythm cleverly subverted by two-beat phrases and by the interplay of the instruments.

The work was published in October 1795 by the English firm of Longman and Broderip as part of a set of three with the opus number (seldom used today) 73. The other two are No. 39 in G major (Hob. XV:25) and No. 40 in F♯ minor, (Hob. XV:26).

== See also ==
- List of piano trios by Joseph Haydn
