= Piano Trio No. 39 (Haydn) =

Piano trio by Joseph Haydn

Haydn by Thomas Hardy (1791)

Joseph Haydn's Piano Trio No. 39 in G major, Hob. XV/25 was written in 1795, during the final few weeks of Haydn's second trip to London, and one of a set of three (H. XV:24–26) dedicated to Rebecca Schroeter. It is perhaps his best-known piano trio and sometimes nicknamed the "Gypsy" or "Gypsy Rondo" trio because of its Rondo finale in 'Hungarian' style.

The trio is in three movements:

1. Andante
2. Poco adagio, cantabile
3. Rondo all'Ongarese: Presto

Rosemary Hughes describes the first movement as "a curious but charming blend of double-variation and rondo, for the two minor sections are extremely free in their connection either with the major main theme or with each other. The alternation of variations in major and minor keys is characteristic of Haydn.

The second movement, which continues the gentle mood, is noted for the violin melody in the central section. This was a particular favourite of cellist Pablo Casals, who (ignoring the score) used to take over from the violinist on the repeat.

The final movement incorporates a number of Gypsy tunes, including the Hungarian "recruiting dance" genre known as Verbunkos, and gypsy effects (such as strumming accompaniments and left-hand pizzicato).

The work was published in October 1795 by the English firm of Longman and Broderip as part of a set of three with the opus number (seldom used today) 73. The other two are No. 38 in D major (Hoboken XV:24) and No. 40 in F♯ minor, (Hoboken XV:26). All are dedicated to Haydn's friend, the widow Rebecca Schroeter.

== See also ==
- List of piano trios by Joseph Haydn
- Piano Trio No. 38
- Piano Trio No. 40
- Haydn and folk music
