= Piano Trio No. 40 (Haydn) =

Piano trio by Joseph Haydn

Portrait of Haydn by Thomas Hardy (1791)

Joseph Haydn's Piano Trio No. 40 in F♯ minor, Hob. XV:26, was completed during the final few weeks of Haydn's second trip to London, and one of a set of three (H. XV:24–26) dedicated to Rebecca Schroeter. With its unusual key, this piano trio has been described by Robert Philip as "subtle and shifting in its moods".

The trio is in three movements.

1. Allegro
2. Adagio cantabile
3. Finale. Tempo di menuetto

The first movement begins quietly in its melancholy minor key, recalling Haydn's Sturm und Drang period of the 1770s, but it soon shifts to the major.

The second movement, in F♯ major, is an alternative scoring of the second movement of Haydn's Symphony No. 102 in B flat major. It is not clear which came first. The repeats in the trio are written out in the symphony, allowing for changes in the orchestration the second time through. The orchestral version also features a rolling triplet accompaniment in the cellos where in the trio the cello simply doubles the piano's bass line. Robert Philip comments that the "delicately florid and rather improvisational style" with its "sudden shifts of key and atmosphere" are more suited to the intimate setting of a trio, suggesting that this version may have come first.

As with the Piano Trio No. 38 in D major (Hob. XV:24), the finale is in the style of a minuet, but tempered with melancholy and wistfulness. It is thought to have been the last movement Haydn wrote before leaving England for good in August 1795.

The work was published in October 1795 by the English firm of Longman and Broderip as part of a set of three with the opus number (seldom used today) 73. The other two are No. 38 in D major (Hob. XV:24) and No. 39 in G major, (Hob. XV:25). All are dedicated to Haydn's friend, the widow Rebecca Schroeter.

== See also ==
- List of piano trios by Joseph Haydn
- Piano Trio No. 38
- Piano Trio No. 39
