= Piano Trio No. 42 (Haydn) =

1797 composition by Joseph Haydn

Portrait of Haydn by Thomas Hardy (1791)

Joseph Haydn's Piano Trio No. 42 in E♭ major, Hob. XV/30 was completed in 1796 after his return to Vienna from England and first published there by Artaria in 1797. It is without a dedication: the piano part is less challenging than those trios dedicated to keyboard virtuosi. This is thought to have been Haydn's last piano trio and with a typical performance time of 20 minutes it is one of his largest. By the time of its publication, Beethoven had already published his first three piano trios (Op 1) setting a new direction for the form away from the 'accompanied piano sonata' towards a more equal and dramatic interplay between piano, violin, and cello.

== Structure ==
The trio is in three movements:

1. Allegro moderato
2. Andante con moto
3. Presto

The first movement's broad opening theme is stated in piano, accompanied by arpeggiated fragments in the strings. This develops into a variety of thematic ideas, including a gently lilting violin melody, before the exposition reaches the dominant key, B♭ major. The second half of the exposition includes a minor-mode episode in which another quietly flowing theme is introduced, giving way to rapid sixteenth-note figuration. The development section presents several unexpected harmonic turns before the home key is reached again. This is the longest movement, often taking over eight minutes to perform.

The second movement, in triple time and in the fairly remote key of C major (the submediant major), involves an alternation between a slow, stately dance and a more animated middle section with a lyrical melody. The movement closes with a pause on the dominant chord that suggests a return to the courtly dance in C, but instead we move straight on to the lively triple-time finale back in the key of E♭ major.

The opening theme of the final movement traces a chromatically rising line, and the frequent up-beat accents lend a quirkiness to the rhythm. Like the first movement, this one contains numerous harmonic surprises. It also illustrates Haydn's subtle changes in melodic leading between the piano right hand and the violin. As W. Dean Sutcliffe has pointed out, "The free interweaving of roles means that the aural spotlight switches incessantly between the two, in such a manner as to make talk of doubling seem both unimaginative and inappropriate." This finale has been said to anticipate the Beethovian scherzo.

== See also ==
- List of piano trios by Joseph Haydn
