= Piano Trio No. 43 (Haydn) =

Piano trio by Joseph Haydn

Joseph Haydn

Joseph Haydn's Piano Trio No. 43 in C major, Hob XV:27, was published in 1797 while Haydn was still in England on the second of his highly successful London visits. It is the first of a set of three trios dedicated to Mrs. Therese Jansen Bartolozzi. Batolozzi was an eminent pianist (a pupil of Muzio Clementi), and this trio is notable for its demanding piano part, at a time when the trio form was mostly associated with amateur performance.

The trio is in three movements.

1. Allegro
2. Andante
3. Finale: Presto

The opening sonata form movement begins with a fanfare and maintains a classical elegance, with many pauses and delicate piano figuration, and a second subject that is derived from the first. The development section intensifies the mood with an almost baroque feel and moves into a false recapitulation in A♭ and some energetic counterpoint, before the lyrical grace of the opening returns in the recapitulation proper. The violinist is asked to perform many embellishments, including double and triple stopping.

In simple A-B-A form, the second movement begins with a gentle siciliano melody, which is restated before moving to a more dramatic A minor section, punctuated by heavy accents and featuring a more important role for the cello than is usual in Haydn trios.

The final movement is one of a number of Haydn movements that use a hybrid of sonata and rondo form, blending the harmonic expectations and development of the sonata with a recurring refrain. It has a striking main theme, and was described by Charles Rosen as the most humorous of all Haydn's movements. The fast pace and drive of the opening is maintained through rapid conversational exchanges between piano and violin, indicating that the era of the trio as an accompanied piano sonata is drawing to a close.

== See also ==
- List of piano trios by Joseph Haydn
- Piano Trio No. 44
- Piano Trio No. 45
