= List of piano trios by Joseph Haydn =

List has Hoboken catalogue number and Robbins Landon chronological number

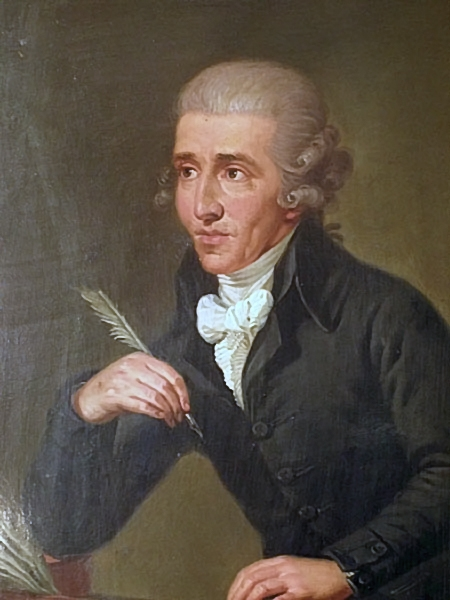
Portrait by Ludwig Guttenbrunn, painted c. 1791–92, depicts Haydn c. 1770

This is a list of piano trios by Joseph Haydn, including the chronological number assigned by H. C. Robbins Landon and the number they are given in Anthony van Hoboken's catalogue of his works. (Hoboken's listings of Haydn compositions are divided by musical genre, and the piano trios as a category are grouped under the Roman numeral prefix XV.)

Haydn's early trios are considered minor works and are seldom played except in the context of complete editions. In contrast, the later trios, starting in the mid-1780s, reflect the composer's full musical maturity and are greatly admired by critics.

== The role of the instruments ==
The piano trios of Haydn are dominated by the piano part. The violin only plays the melody a certain amount of the time, and is often doubled by the piano when it does. The cello part is very much subordinated, usually just doubling the bass line in the piano. Charles Rosen discusses and defends this asymmetry, relating it to the sonority of the instruments of Haydn's day: the piano was fairly weak and "tinkling" in tone, and benefited from the tonal strengthening of other instruments.

== Assessment ==
The dominance of the piano part does not imply that the late trios are not of the highest quality. Rosen devotes an entire chapter of his book The Classical Style to them, focusing on the works from the 1780s and beyond (Nos. 18–27 and 32–45), while also mentioning two of the early ones (Nos. 5 and 17). He notes that Haydn's trios are "along with the Mozart concertos the most brilliant piano works before Beethoven." Gretchen Wheelock refers to the trios as "incredible," adding that "the late works especially are brilliantly virtuosic, exploiting the full idiomatic range of the instrument [i.e., the piano]. They are also among the most harmonically adventurous of his works in any genre, often reaching into remote keys via enharmonic modulation. As such they are challenging essays for both players and listeners."

== List of piano trios ==
=== Early trios ===
- No. 1 in F major, Hoboken Hob. XV:37 (composed by 1766; possibly dating as far back as 1760)
- No. 2 in C major, Hoboken XV:C1 (composed by 1766; possibly dating as far back as 1760)
- No. 3 in G major, Hoboken XIV:6 (composed by 1767)
- No. 4 in F major, Hoboken XV:39 (composed by 1767)
- No. 5 in G minor, Hoboken XV:1 (composed by 1766; possibly dating as far back as ca. 1760–62)
- No. 6 in F major, Hoboken XV:40 (exists with a different slow movement as the piano concerto Hob. XVIII:7; composed by 1766; possibly dating as far back as ca. 1760)
- No. 7 in G major, Hoboken XV:41 (composed by 1767; possibly dating as far back as 1760)
- No. 8 in D major, Hoboken XV:33 (lost) (composed by 1771; possibly dating as far back as 1760)
- No. 9 in D major, Hoboken XV:D1 (lost) (composed by 1771)
- No. 10 in A major, Hoboken XV:35 (composed by 1771; possibly dating as far back as ca. 1764–65)
- No. 11 in E major, Hoboken XV:34 (composed by 1771; possibly dating as far back as 1760)
- No. 12 in E♭ major, Hoboken XV:36 (composed by 1774; possibly dating as far back as 1760)
- No. 13 in B♭ major, Hoboken XV:38 (composed by 1769; possibly dating as far back as 1760)
- No. 14 in F minor, Hoboken XV:f1 (composed by 1760)
- No. 15 in D major, Hoboken XV:deest
- No. 16 in C major, Hoboken XIV:C1 (composed by 1766; possibly dating as far back as 1760)
- No. 17 in F major, Hoboken XV:2 (Originally composed for keyboard, baryton and 2 violins in 1769, Hob. XIV:2, later reworked into a keyboard trio for its publication in 1785.)

=== Later trios ===
- No. 18 in G major, Hoboken XV:5 (1784)
- No. 19 in F major, Hoboken XV:6 (1784)
- No. 20 in D major, Hoboken XV:7 (1784)
- No. 21 in B♭ major, Hoboken XV:8 (1784)
- No. 22 in A major, Hoboken XV:9 (1785)
- No. 23 in E♭ major, Hoboken XV:10 (1785)
- No. 24 in E♭ major, Hoboken XV:11 (1788)
- No. 25 in E minor, Hoboken XV:12 (1788)
- No. 26 in C minor, Hoboken XV:13 (1789)
- No. 27 in A♭ major, Hoboken XV:14 (1790)
- No. 28 in D major, Hoboken XV:16 (1790, with flute instead of violin)
- No. 29 in G major, Hoboken XV:15 (1790, with flute instead of violin)
- No. 30 in F major, Hoboken XV:17 (1790, with flute instead of violin)
- No. 31 in G major, Hoboken XV:32 (1792: cello part may not be authentic)

Three trios (H. XV:18–20) dedicated to Princess Maria Anna, wife of Prince Anton Esterházy:

- No. 32 in A major, Hoboken XV:18 (1793)
- No. 33 in G minor, Hoboken XV:19 (1793)
- No. 34 in B♭ major, Hoboken XV:20 (1794)

Three trios (H. XV:21–23) dedicated to Princess Maria Josepha, wife of Prince Nicholas Esterházy:

- No. 35 in C major, Hoboken XV:21 (1794)
- No. 36 in E♭ major, Hoboken XV:22 (1794)
- No. 37 in D minor, Hoboken XV:23 (1794)

Three trios (H. XV:24–26) dedicated to Rebecca Schroeter:

- No. 38 in D major, Hoboken XV:24 (1795)
- No. 39 in G major, Hoboken XV:25 (1795) "Gypsy"
- No. 40 in F♯ minor, Hoboken XV:26 (1795)

Two stand-alone trios (H. XV:31, 30):

- No. 41 in E♭ minor, Hoboken XV:31 (1797) "Jacob's Dream"
- No. 42 in E♭ major, Hoboken XV:30 (1797)

Three trios (H. XV:27–29), known as the "Bartolozzi Trios," dedicated to Theresa Jansen (Bartolozzi):

- No. 43 in C major, Hoboken XV:27 (1797)
- No. 44 in E major, Hoboken XV:28 (1797)
- No. 45 in E♭ major, Hoboken XV:29 (1797)

== See also ==
- List of compositions by Joseph Haydn
- List of concertos by Joseph Haydn
- List of masses by Joseph Haydn
- List of operas by Joseph Haydn
- List of solo piano compositions by Joseph Haydn
- List of string quartets by Joseph Haydn
- List of symphonies by Joseph Haydn
- Hoboken-Verzeichnis
