= Edward Miller (musician) =

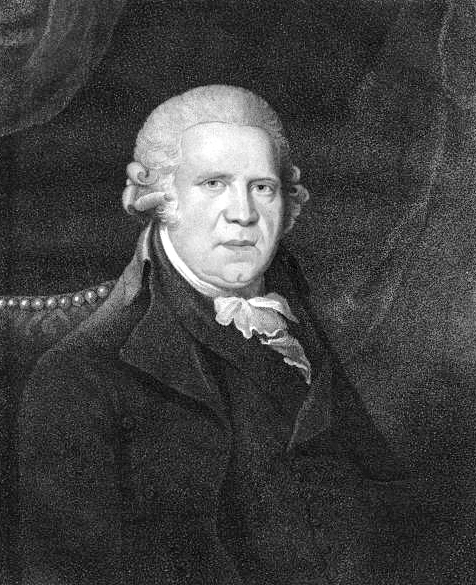
- Portrait by Thomas Hardy

Background information
- Born: Edward Miller; 1731 or 30 October 1735
- Origin: Norwich
- Died: 12 September 1807 (aged 71) Wheatley, Oxfordshire
- Genre: Classical
- Occupations: Composer, musician
- Instruments: Organ, harpsichord, flute

Edward Miller (1731 or 1735 – 1807) was an English musician, composer and historian of Doncaster. He is most noted as the writer of the hymn tunes Rockingham and Galway.

== Life ==
Miller was the son of a pavior, but left home to study music, from Charles Burney, who was then at King's Lynn. For a time he was a flautist in Handel's orchestra.

In 1752, he published 'Six Solos for the German Flute' (London). On 25 July 1756, he was appointed organist of St George's Minster Doncaster in 1756 and continued in the post for 50 years, on the recommendation of James Nares, and he supplemented his resources by giving lessons on the pianoforte. In 1768, he published 'Six Sonatas for the Harpsichord' (London), and in 1771 the work by which he is best known, The Institutes of Music,; this work ran into sixteen editions. In 1773, he published Twelve Songs (London), Elegies for Voice and Pianoforte (London), and in 1774, he issued by subscription, under the patronage of the king, The Psalms of David set to Music and arranged for every Sunday in the year. For this work he had over five thousand subscribers. In 1774, Francis Linley was born (blind) at Doncaster, and from an early age studied under Miller.

In 1784, Miller published 'Letters in behalf of Professors of Music residing in the Country' (London), a critique of which occurs in the 'Critical Review,'. It is a plea that poor musicians in the country should benefit as well as those in London by the Handel commemoration festival then in contemplation.

The University of Cambridge awarded him a doctorate in 1786.

In 1787, he published simultaneously in London and Dublin his 'Treatise of Thorough Bass and Composition.' In 1791, he published 'Thoughts on the present performance of Psalmody in the Established Church of England addressed to the Clergy' (London), and in 1792 'A Letter to the Country Spectator in reply to the author of his 9th Number ... by a Professor of Music' (London and Doncaster), which is a defence of 'Fiddlers.'

In 1801 he published The Psalms of Watts and Wesley for three Voices for the use of Methodists (London), and in 1804 The History and Antiquities of Doncaster and its vicinity with anecdotes of Eminent Men, with a map, &c. (Doncaster). He was also the author of The Tears of Yorkshire on the death of the Most Noble the Marquis of Rockingham (London, 1782), and Fetis states that he began a translation of J. J. Rousseau's Dictionnaire de la Musique, of which a few proofs of the first eighteen pages were printed, but no more.

Miller arranged the tune Rockingham as a hymn tune in 1790, to which Isaac Watts' hymn "When I Survey the Wondrous Cross" is sung. Miller also wrote the tune Galway, to which Charles Wesley's hymn "A charge to keep I have" is sung.

He died at Doncaster on 12 September 1807.

== Works ==
- The Psalms of David Set to New Music, 1774
- Elements of Thorough-bass and Composition, 1787
- The Psalms of David for the Use of Parish Churches, 1790
- Thoughts on the Present Performance of Psalmody, 1791
- The Psalms of Watts and Wesley, 1801
- Sacred Music, 1802
- History of Doncaster, 1804

== Sources ==
- Timms, George (Chairman of editors), ed. (1986). New English Hymnal. Norwich: Canterbury Press. p. 212. ISBN 0-907547-51-6.
- Hymns Ancient and Modern Revised. Norwich: Canterbury Press. 1981. p. 435. ISBN 0-907547-08-7.
