= Philemon und Baucis (Haydn) =

First puppet-opera written by Joseph Haydn

- Opera by Joseph Haydn
- Portrait by Thomas Hardy, 1791
- Language: German
- Based on: Philemon und Baucis: Ein Schauspiel in Versen von einem Aufzuge by Gottlieb Konrad Pfeffel
- Premiere: 2 September 1773; Esterháza puppet theater

Philemon und Baucis, oder Jupiters Reise auf die Erde (Philemon and Baucis, or Jupiter's Journey to Earth), Hob. XXIXb:2, is an opera in one act by Austrian composer Joseph Haydn to a German libretto, possibly by Prince Esterházy's librarian, Phillip Georg Bader. The text is based upon a play by G. K. Pfeffel, itself a retelling of the Baucis and Philemon myth from Ovid's Metamorphoses. The work is in the form of a Singspiel.

== Composition history ==
| Hob. No. | Subtitles | Dates | Key | Notes |
|---|---|---|---|---|
| XXIXa:1 | Philemon und Baucis | 1773 | | puppet-opera |
| XXIXa:1a | Prelude to XXIXa:1 | | D major | Der Götterat; music lost |
| XXIXb:2 | Philemon und Baucis | 1776 | D minor | Singspiel after puppet-opera XXIXa:1 |

Premiering in 1773 for a visit from Empress Maria Theresa, Philemon und Baucis is Haydn's first puppet-opera, and the first known to be written for the Eszterháza Marionettentheater (puppet theater). Its premiere was complemented by a Vorspiel, Der Götterrat (The Council of the Gods), and possibly Haydn's Symphony No. 50, Hob. I:50. Philemon und Baucis was revised to be a traditional opera in 1776.

In 1950, an original manuscript was uncovered at the Paris Conservatoire by musicologist and Haydn scholar Jens Peter Larsen. Until this discovery, all that remained of the work was its overture and a single aria. Apart from the score for the main story, the manuscript included the entrance of Diana and additional music by Haydn (including an aria from Il mondo della luna), Carlo d'Ordoñez, and Gluck. The rest of the puppet-opera, including the arrival of Jupiter, the pageant, and the epilogue, which glorified the Empress and the Habsburgs, remain lost, likely destroyed in the Eszterháza fire of 1779.

== Roles ==
Roles, voice types, premiere cast
| Role | Voice type | Premiere cast, 2 September 1773 Conductor: Joseph Haydn |
Humans
| Philemon, old man | tenor | Johann Haydn |
| Baucis, his wife | soprano | Elisabeth Griessler |
| Aret, their son | tenor | Michael Ernst |
| Narcissa, his wife | soprano | Eleonora Jager |
Chorus: peasants
Gods
| Mercury | spoken | |
| Jupiter | spoken | |

The opera is scored for 2 oboes, bassoon, 2 horns, 2 clarini (natural trumpets), timpani, 2 violins, viola, and continuo.

== Synopsis ==
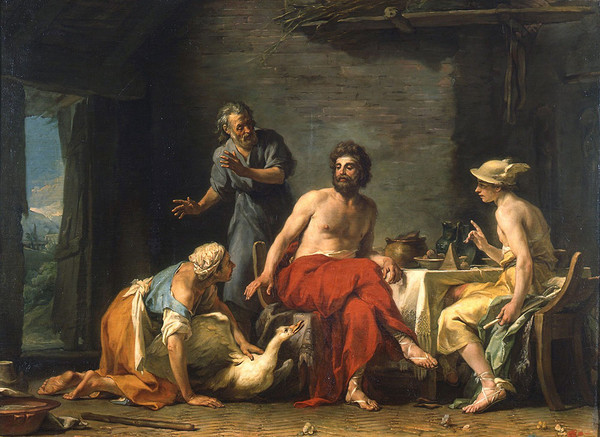
Philémon et Baucis donnant l'hospitalité à Jupiter et Mercure by Jean-Bernard Restout, 1769

=== Part I ===
Setting: A village in ancient Phrygia

Philemon and Baucis, husband and wife, assist their son Aret and his fiancé Narcissa in preparing for their wedding. As narrator, Mercury furtively watches the family and the other peasants of the village as their behavior grows more and more raucous and depraved. The other gods entreat Jupiter to stop the madness. At the top of Mount Olympus, the gods agree to send a storm upon Phrygia as punishment. The oncoming storm surprises the peasants, and Aret and Narcissa are killed by a bolt of lightning. At first, Philemon and Baucis beg the gods for mercy, but eventually resolve to accept the divine judgment. The storm dissipates.

=== Part II ===
After being rejected from all other homes in the village, Jupiter and Mercury arrive at the doorstep of Philemon and Baucis, dressed incognito as vagabonds. The old couple invites the gods inside their hut, still lamenting the passing of Aret and Narcissa, whose ashes are preserved in urns. Touched by the couple's hospitality and grief, Jupiter and Mercury reveal their true identities and reanimate the bodies of Aret and Narcissa from the ashes. Filled with gratitude, Philemon and Baucis plead with Jupiter to turn their hut into a temple so that they may serve his honor as priest and priestess. Jupiter agrees, and everyone sings his praises. The gods rebuke the earlier unwelcoming peasants before ascending to heaven.

== Recordings ==
- 1953: Meinhard von Zallinger (cond.); Vienna Symphony Orchestra; Erich Majkut (Philemon), Susana Naidic (Baucis), Waldemar Kmentt (Aret), Elisabeth Roon (Narcissa); choir of the Vienna State Opera. LP, Vox PL 7660
- 2009 (rec. 2002): Wolfgang Brunner (cond.); Salzburger Hofmusik; Manuel Warwitz (Philemon), Nathalie Vinzent (Baucis), Bernhard Berchtold (Aret), Ulrike Hofbauer (Narcissa); Kammerchor Salzburg. CD, Profil PH 09038
- 2009 (rec. 2008): Manfred Huss (cond.); Haydn Sinfonietta Wien; Christoph Genz (Philemon), Maren Engelhardt (Baucis), Jan Petryka (Aret), Alexandra Reinprecht (Narcissa); Vocalforum Graz. BIS-SACD-1813
