= Gottlieb Konrad Pfeffel =

French-German librettist, poet, and translator (1736–1809)

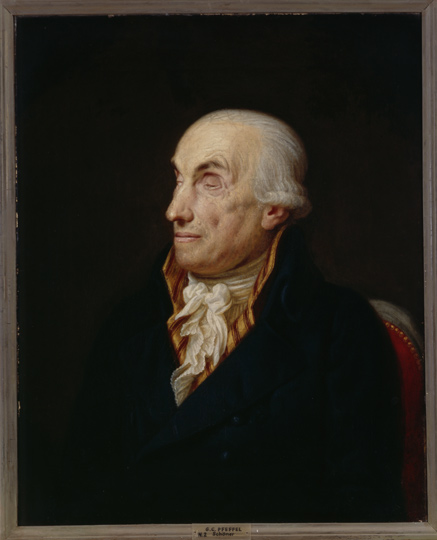
- Painting by Georg Friedrich Adolph Schöner, 1809
- Born: 28 June 1736; Colmar, France
- Died: 1 May 1809 (aged 72)
- Education: University of Halle
- Occupations: Librettist, poet, and translator
- Spouse(s): Margaretha Cleophe Divoux (1738–1809); married February 1759
- Children: 13

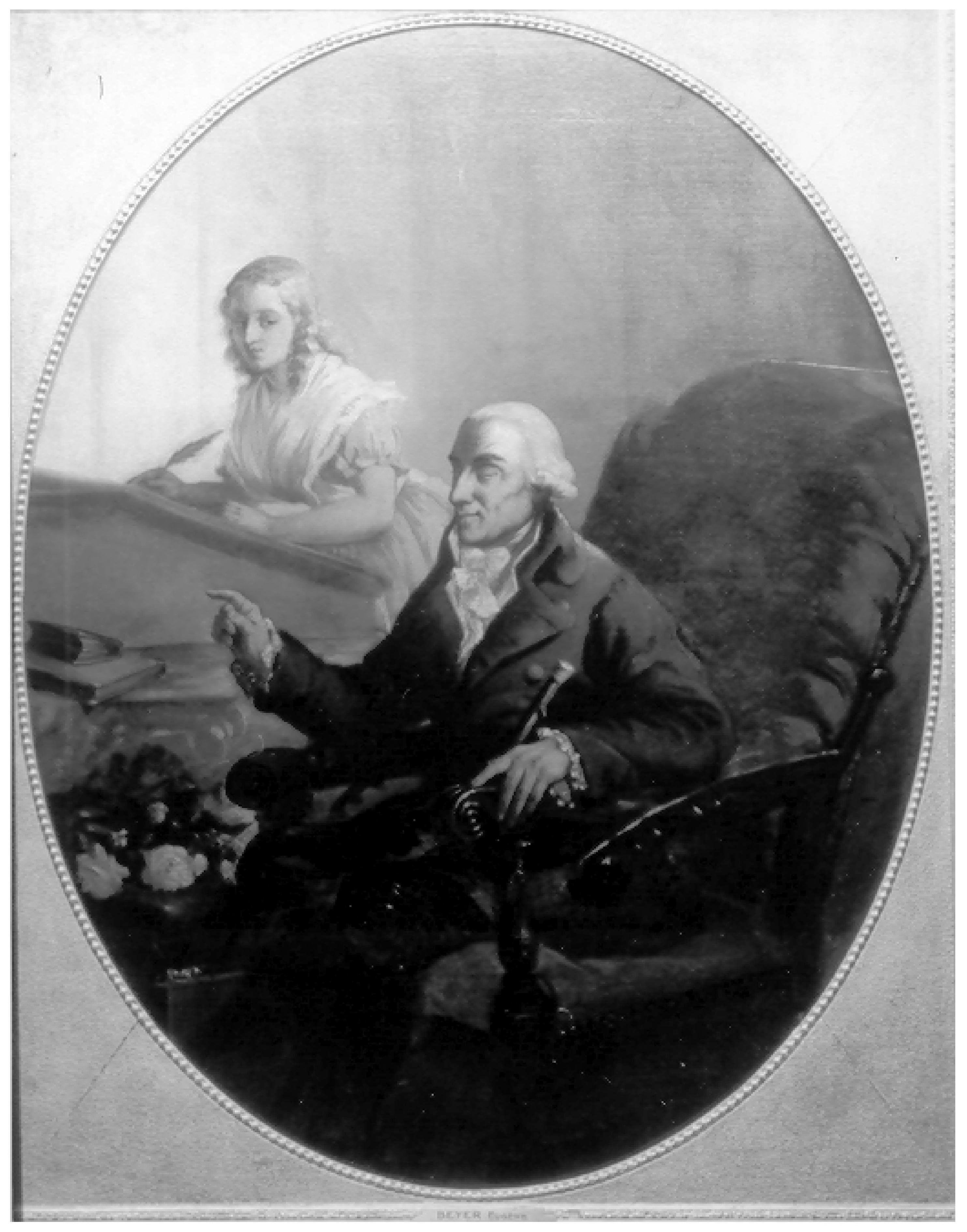
Pfeffel Dictating to His Daughter, image accompanying a text dedicated to Johann Georg Jacobi, 1800

Gottlieb Konrad Pfeffel (28 June 1736 – 1 May 1809) was a French-German writer and translator from the Pfeffel family.

His texts were put to music by Ludwig van Beethoven, Joseph Haydn and Franz Schubert. He is sometimes also known as Amédée or Théophile Conrad Pfeffel, which is the French translation of Gottlieb ("Godlove").

== Biography ==
Gottlieb Konrad Pfeffel was born in Colmar. His father, Johann Konrad Pfeffel (1682–1738), was the mayor of Colmar and a legal consultant of the French king, but died when Gottlieb was only two years old. His mother was Anna Katharina Pfeffel, née Herr (1694–1773), daughter of patrician of Colmar Johann Georg Herr. His father was the son of a pastor Johann Konrad Pfeffel (1636–1701). He was raised by his brother Christian Friedrich Pfeffel von Kriegelstein (1726–1807), who was ten years older.

He went in 1751 to the University of Halle to study law, with the intention of becoming a diplomat. There, he was a student of the philosopher Christian Wolff.

In 1752, Pfeffel translated Johann Joachim Spalding's Gedanken über den Werth der Gefühle in dem Christenthum into French.

In 1754, he went to Dresden for treatment of an eye problem; there, he met the poet Christian Fürchtegott Gellert. His eye condition deteriorated, and in 1758, after an operation, he became completely blind and had to abandon his studies.

In February 1759, Pfeffel married Margaretha Cleophe Divoux (1738–1809), a merchant's daughter from Strasbourg. They had thirteen children together, of whom seven died before adulthood.

His son Gottlieb Conrad August Pfeffel (b. 1759), who studied law in Göttingen, was admitted to the Golden Circle Lodge there in 1781. The other son was Carl Friedrich Pfeffel (1775–1858) who subsequently became Banker and member of Parliament.

He started to establish himself as a writer and translator. In 1762, he translated Magnus Gottfried Lichtwer's Fabeln into French. He also worked on a translation into German of Claude Fleury's Histoire ecclésiastique.

Pfeffel opened a military academy for aristocratic Protestants in 1773, since these boys were not allowed at the military academy of Paris.

He joined the Helvetic Society in 1776, and in 1782 became a citizen of the city of Biel (Bienne) in Switzerland, and became an honorary member of the city council in 1783. The Prussian Academy of Arts made him an honorary member in 1788.

After the French Revolution, Pfeffel lost the military academy and his fortune, and found jobs with the educational board of Colmar, with the publisher Tübingen-Cotta, and as a translator, until Napoleon I granted him an annual pension in 1806.

He wrote many articles for the magazine Flora.

In 1808, Pfeffel became an honorary member of the Bavarian Academy of Sciences and Humanities. He died the next year.

His poem Der freie Mann was put to music by Ludwig van Beethoven (catalogue number WoO 117) in 1794 or 1795. Franz Schubert made a lied of his text Der Vatermörder (D10), and Leopold Kozeluch put music to his cantata for the blind Austrian singer Maria Theresia von Paradis.

In 1773, Pfeffel's Philemon und Baucis: Ein Schauspiel in Versen von einem Aufzuge, a play in verse in one act, was turned into a singspiel for a marionette theater by Joseph Haydn with the new title Philemon und Baucis oder Jupiters Reise auf die Erde (Philemon and Baucis or Jupiter's Travels to the Earth). It was changed into a regular opera in 1776.

Pfeffel was a friend or acquaintance of many well-known persons of his period, including Voltaire, Vittorio Alfieri and the Swiss poet Johann Kaspar Lavater, with whom he corresponded for many years. In 1839, his grandniece Ernestine von Pfeffel (1810–1894) married Fyodor Tyutchev, one of the most famous Russian poets.

A statue of Pfeffel by André Friedrich was placed in the Unterlinden Museum in 1859, and a copy of that statue was placed on the Grand Rue in Colmar in 1927.

== Bibliography ==
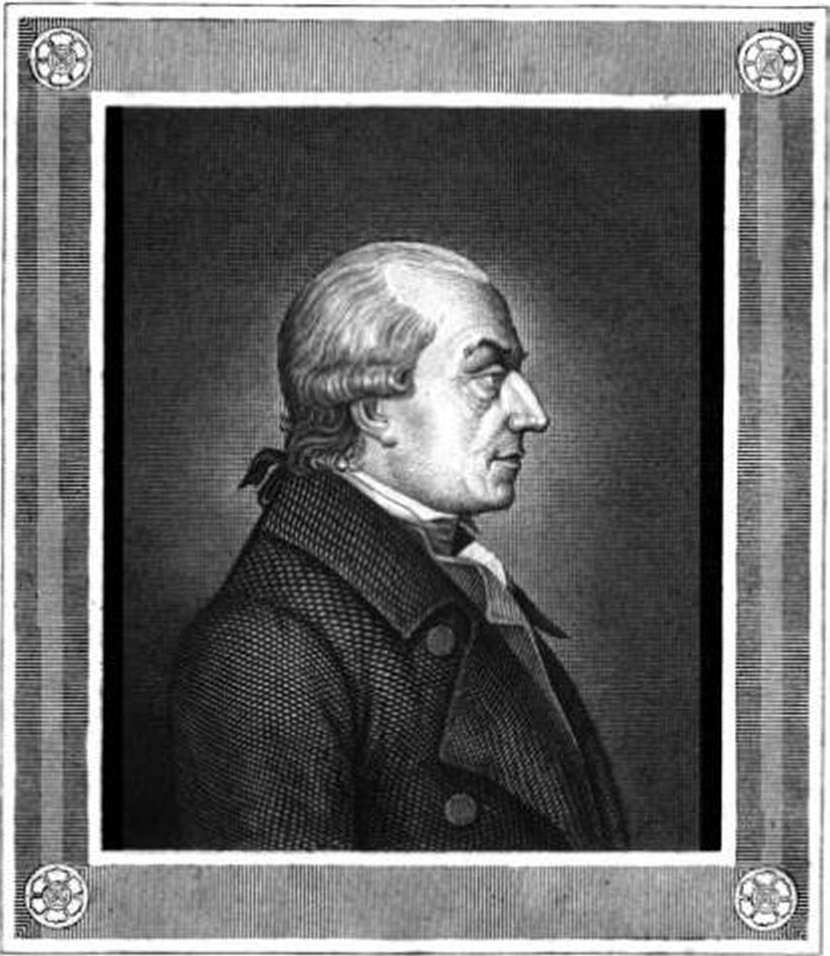
Portrait from volume 10 of the 1841 edition of the Poetische Versuche

- Der Einsiedler, 1761
- Philemon und Baucis: Ein Schauspiel in Versen von einem Aufzuge: 6 editions published between 1763 and 1773 in 4 languages: reprinted as Philemon und Baucis, oder, Jupiters Reise auf die Erde : deutsche Marionetten-Oper: music by Joseph Haydn, 1773
- Dramatische Kinderspiele: 5 volumes published between 1763 and 1774: translated in French
- Magazin für den Verstand und das Herz, 1764, translated in Russian and French
- Neue Beyträge zur Deutschen Maculatur: 2 editions published in 1766
- Freymund, oder der übel angebrachte Stolz: ein Lustspiel in fünf Aufzügen, 1770
- Der Einsiedler: ein Trauerspiel in Versen von einem Aufzuge, 1771
- Serena: ein bürgerliches Trauerspiel, 1776, with Paul Landois
- Lieder für die Colmarische Kriegsschule, 1778
- Fabeln, der Helvetischen Gesellschaft gewidmet: 8 editions published between 1783 and 1815
- Histoire du regne de Marie-Thérèse, 1786
- Poetische Versuche von Gottlieb Conrad Pfeffel: 71 editions published between 1789 and 1968 in 4 languages: also published in 3 parts, with a further 11 editions, and with three additional parts in 1802, eventually growing to ten bands by 1810
- Prosaische Versuche: 27 editions published between 1794 and 1813, expanded to 10 bands by 1810
- Contes et nouvelles, 1822 (French translation of a selection of his work)
- Briefe über Religion an Bettina: 7 editions published in 1824 in 3 languages
- Ausgewählte Unterhaltungen, Volumes 5–6, 1828
- Bloemlezing uit de fabelen en vertellingen, Dutch translation from 1832
- Fabeln und poetische Erzählungen: 9 editions published between 1840 and 1861: translated as Fables et poésies choisies in 1840
- Historisches Magazin für Verstand und Herz, 1840
- Poetische Werke: Mit Biographie und Portrait, vols, 1–3, 1841
- G C Pfeffel's Epistel an die Nachwelt, 1859
- Pfeffel-Album: Gaben elsässischer Dichter, 1859
- Gottlieb Konrad Pfeffels Fremdenbuch mit biographischen und culturgeschichtlichen Erläuterungen, 1892
- Skorpion und Hirtenknabe; Fabeln, Epigramme, poetische Erzählungen, Biographie eines Pudels und andere Prosa, 1970
- Biographie eines Pudels und andere Satiren: 2 editions published in 1987
