= Luigia Polzelli =

Italian opera singer

Luigia Polzelli (also Polcelli; c. 1760 – 5 October 1830) was an Italian mezzo-soprano, who sang at the Esterházy court in Hungary during the late 18th century. She was for a number of years the lover of the composer Joseph Haydn.

== Early years ==
Luigia Polzelli was born Luigia Moreschi in Naples sometime around 1760. She married the violinist Antonio Polzelli some time before 1779. The couple apparently lived in Bologna.

== Relationship with Haydn ==
Luigia arrived at the Esterházy court with her husband Antonio in 1779; both had two-year contracts. Luigia was nineteen years old at the time. Polzelli soon turned out not to be a particularly able singer. Moreover, her husband had difficulties in fulfilling his duties as a violinist, as he was in the initial stages of a long drawn out demise from tuberculosis. The reigning prince, Nikolaus Esterházy, was a great connoisseur of opera who was well acquainted with high-quality singing, and recognizing Luigia's mediocrity and Antonio's unreliability he soon moved (1780) to have them dismissed (in fact, he was willing to buy out the rest of their contracts). However, at this time it emerged that Polzelli had become the lover of Haydn, then 48, who had had a very bad relationship with his wife almost since the beginning of their marriage. The Prince, who valued Haydn's services immensely, apparently agreed to keep the Polzellis on the payroll.

Rosemary Hughes, assessing the relationship, notes that "both of them looked forward to an eventual marriage", though under the rules of Roman Catholic Church to which they both belonged, this was completely impossible until the deaths of their respective spouses.

The relationship between Haydn and Polzelli continued for over ten years, until about 1791.

== Musical influence on Haydn ==
Polzelli had an important influence on Haydn's musical output, for a somewhat negative reason: despite frequent tutoring from Haydn, she often had trouble with difficult parts. An important part of Haydn's job at Eszterháza was to put on productions of operas by other composers. Where arias assigned to Luigia were too difficult for her to sing, Haydn wrote insertion arias for her, replacing the originals in performance. According to Jones there were at least five such arias; possibly as many as ten; he describes them as follows.

She was most comfortable with syllabic settings that avoided decoration, shortish phrases that did not demand sophisticated breathing, a vocal range that did not stray much on either side of the stave and with an accompaniment that doubled the voice rather than allowed it to compete with the orchestra. This may have been how Haydn managed to keep Polzelli on stage without revealing her limitations but, conveniently, they were also techniques habitually associated with the musical characterization of the roles allotted to Polzelli, the maids and peasants of comic opera.

Haydn wrote a considerable number of operas himself (see List of operas by Joseph Haydn), but only twice assigned Polzelli a role (Silvia in L'isola disabitata and Lisetta in La vera costanza).

== Children ==
Luigia already had a two-year-old son, Pietro (1777–1796), when she arrived at Esterháza. She bore a second son, Antonio (1783–1855) in her third year there. Both she and Antonio believed that he was the natural son of Haydn, though Haydn himself never admitted this, at least in writing.

Haydn, who was hitherto childless, was fond of both Pietro and Antonio. He gave them musical instruction and became their guardian on the death of their legal father. In 1792, Haydn took Pietro into his Vienna home, continued his instruction, and got him a position as a piano teacher in an aristocratic home. Pietro died of tuberculosis in 1796. Antonio became a violinist in the Esterházy court orchestra in 1803.

== Breakup ==
Luigia and her husband lost their jobs in September 1790, when her employer Prince Nikolaus Esterházy died, and his successor Anton dismissed virtually the entire musical establishment that had served under his father. Like Haydn, they moved to Vienna, where Antonio died the following year. Luigia did not accompany Haydn when he departed for England in December 1790.

At that time, Haydn still considered himself committed to a future marriage with Luigia, should this be made possible by the death of his wife. On hearing from Luigia of Antonio's death, he wrote her from London, expressing his longing for "the time ... when two pairs of eyes will close", and begging her to write, saying "your letters are a comfort to me however sad I am.". However, the relationship soon cooled; in 1792 "constant reports reached Haydn from Vienna that Luigia Polzelli had been speaking ill of him, and had even sold the piano he had given her." Luigia soon left Vienna herself, returning to Italy and finding work in a small theater in Piacenza.

Haydn eventually wrote sorrowfully to her asking that if she married again she would let him know "the name of the man who will be so happy as to possess you.". Not long after, Haydn embarked on a new romantic relationship in London with the English widow Rebecca Schroeter.

== Later life ==
Luigia later worked in a small theater in Bologna. Haydn remained in contact with her, sending her money from time to time, and when in 1800 Haydn's wife Maria Anna died, Polzelli persuaded him to write the following promise:

I, the undersigned, promise to Signora Loisa Polzelli (in case I should consider marrying again) to take no wife other than said Loisa Polzelli, and should I remain a widower, I promise said Polzelli to leave her, after my death, a pension for life of three hundred gulden (in figures 300 fl.) in Viennese currency. Valid before any judge, I herewith set my hand and seal.

There are a few more letters sending money.

While Haydn kept to his promise and never remarried, Polzelli ultimately married a singer named Luigi Franchi. The two later traveled to Cremona and then to Hungary, where Luigia died in poverty in 1830.

The Haydn scholar Vernon Gotwals observed that, although the elderly Haydn spent many hours being interviewed by his biographers Georg August Griesinger and Albert Christoph Dies, he appears never to have mentioned Polzelli to them. Haydn did mention to Dies, nostalgically, his later love interest Rebecca Schroeter, and kept copies of her letters.

== Correspondence ==
Polzelli is of importance to Haydn's biographers, as a number of Haydn's letters to her are preserved, containing information about the composer. They are written in Italian.
