= Symphony No. 50 (Haydn) =

Symphony in four movements by Joseph Haydn

Joseph Haydn

Symphony No. 50 in C major, Hoboken I/50, by Joseph Haydn was written partly in 1773 and partly in 1774.

The symphony is scored for two oboes, two horns, two trumpets, timpani, and strings. Since the trumpets double the horns at the same pitch for most of the piece, Antony Hodgson has suggested the trumpets may be omitted. The edition by Helmut Schultz published by Universal Edition under the editorship of H. C. Robbins Landon specifies horns in C-alto with trumpets in parentheses.

It is in four movements:

1. Adagio e maestoso, 4/4 – Allegro di molto, 3/4
2. Andante moderato, 2/4 in G major
3. Menuetto e Trio, 3/4
4. Presto, 2/2

It is possible that the first two movements of this symphony were reconstructed from a marionette opera by Haydn called Der Gotterath (Prologue to Philemon und Baucis), now lost. The marionette show was performed for the Empress Maria Theresa in 1773.

Given that Empress Maria Theresia held rather conservative tastes in music and that this symphony is in some ways less "advanced" than No. 48, scholars such as H. C. Robbins Landon have suggested that No. 50 may be the symphony Haydn wrote for the imperial visit to Eszterháza.
