= Daria Tyutcheva =

Daughter of the poet Fyodor Tyutchev

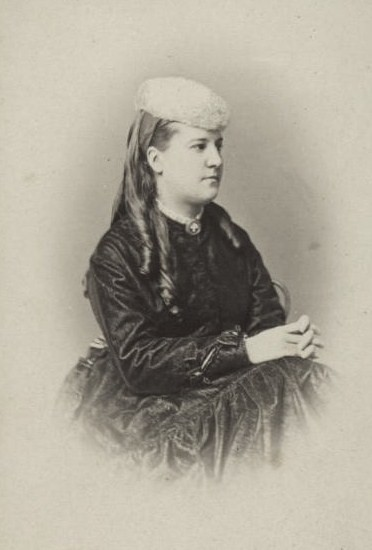
- Born: 24 April 1834; Munich, German Empire
- Died: 1903 (aged 68–69); Russian Empire
- Noble family: Tyutchev
- Father: Fyodor Tyutchev
- Mother: Countess Emilia Eleonore Sophie Louise Christina von Bothmer

Daria Fedorovna Tyutcheva (1834 - 1903) was the second daughter of the poet Fyodor Tyutchev and his first wife, Countess Eleonore von Bothmer.

== Biography ==
Daria was born on 24 April 1838. She spent much of her childhood in Munich. Between 1845 and 1851, she was enrolled in the Smolny Institute of Noble Maidens. After she graduated, she lived with her father's family. Daria became a Lady-in-waiting to Empress Maria Alexandrovna on 5 September 1858.

It is known that she was treated in a clinic for the mentally ill for nervous shock caused by her unrequited love for Emperor Alexander II. Her sister Anna Tyutcheva mentions in her diary for 1858 painful seizures Daria suffered from, caused by gossip about her and the emperor.

After Alexander's marriage to Princess Ekaterina Dolgorukova, Daria fled the court and moved to her sister's in Moscow. Before leaving, she wrote an impudent letter to the emperor, in which she thanked him for the mercy shown to her and the preservation of all marital privileges, but asked him to promise her that under the new conditions, she would not be placed in a position that offended her feelings for the memory of the late Empress. This letter, according to Countess Alexandra Tolstaya, destroyed any relations she had left with the palace:

“Opinions are divided on her account. Some considered Tyutcheva a heroine, in her own way Joan of Arc, others simply ill-bred."

Under the rule of Alexander III, Daria returned to court. On 15 May 1883, she was granted the Order of Saint Catherine. From 1891, she acted as a chamber maid of honour. She remained at court until her death in 1903, she never married. Count Sergei Sheremetev wrote about her:

"She had an independent character and lived apart, smart, lively, observant and ardent, she is immeasurably taller than her older sister, but she did not matter to Ekaterina Fedorovna Tyutcheva"

She kept in touch with her family. 51 letters from Fydor Tyutchev to his daughter from 1857 to 1873 have been preserved. He dedicated three poems to his daughter. At the end of his life, he wrote of Daria:

“To you, so loving and so lonely, to whom I may have inherited this terrible property that has no name, disturbing all balance in life, this thirst for love, which you, my poor child, have remained unsatisfied.”

In 1900, she and I. F. Tyutchev carried out the second, supplemented, edition of her father's works.
