= When I Survey the Wondrous Cross =

English Christian hymn

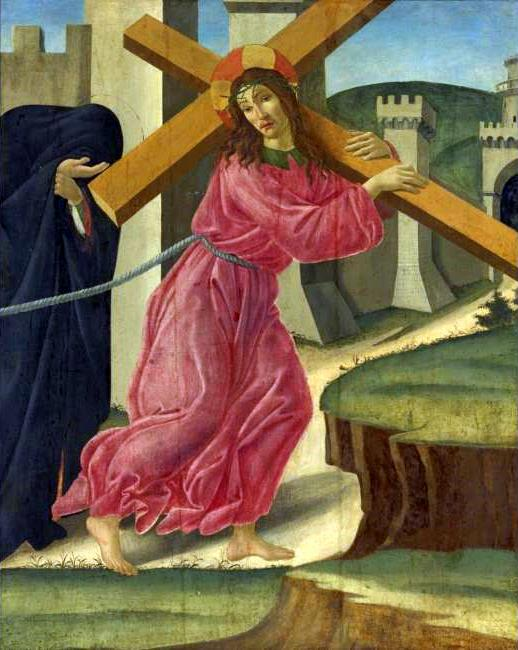
- Christ Carrying the Cross (1490–91) by Sandro Botticelli
- Genre: Hymn
- Written: 1707
- Text: Isaac Watts
- Based on: Galatians 6:14
- Meter: 8.8.8.8 (L.M.)
- Melody: "Rockingham" arranged by Edward Miller, "Hamburg" by Lowell Mason, and others

The hymn "When I Survey the Wondrous Cross" was written by Isaac Watts, and published in Hymns and Spiritual Songs in 1707. It is significant for being an innovative departure from the early English hymn style of only using paraphrased biblical texts, although the first couplet of the second verse paraphrases Galatians 6:14a and the second couplet of the fourth verse paraphrases Gal. 6:14b. The poetry of "When I survey…" may be seen as English literary baroque.

== Text ==
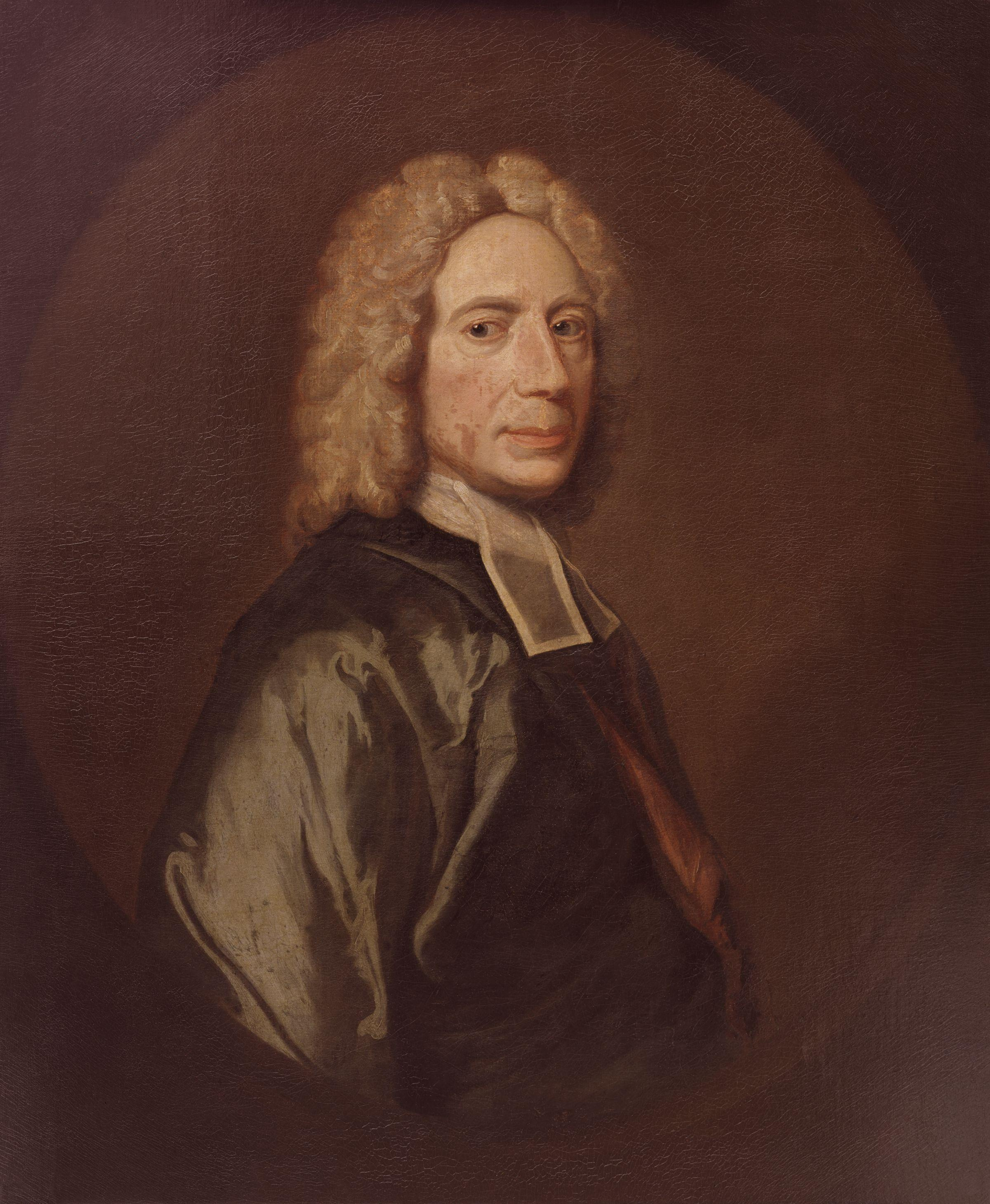
Isaac Watts

The second line of the first stanza originally read "Where the young Prince of Glory dy'd". Watts himself altered that line in the 1709 edition of Hymns and Spiritual Songs, to prevent it from being mistaken as an allusion to Prince William, Duke of Gloucester, the heir to the throne who died at age 11.

The hymn's fourth stanza ("His dying crimson...") is commonly omitted in printed versions, a practice that began with George Whitefield in 1757.

In the final stanza, some modern variations substitute the word "offering" for "present".

1. When I survey the wond'rous Cross
On which the Prince of Glory dy'd,
My richest Gain I count but Loss,
And pour Contempt on all my Pride.

2. Forbid it, Lord, that I should boast,
Save in the Death of Christ my God:
All the vain Things that charm me most,
I sacrifice them to his Blood.

3. See from his Head, his Hands, his Feet,
Sorrow and Love flow mingled down!
Did e'er such Love and Sorrow meet,
Or Thorns compose so rich a Crown?

4. His dying Crimson, like a Robe,
Spreads o'er his Body on the Tree;
Then I am dead to all the Globe,
And all the Globe is dead to me.

5. Were the whole Realm of Nature mine,
That were a Present far too small;
Love so amazing, so divine,
Demands my Soul, my Life, my All.

== Musical settings ==
The hymn is usually sung to either "Rockingham" or "Hamburg", the former being more closely associated with the text in British and Commonwealth hymnals. Another alternative, associated with the text in the 19th and 20th centuries, is "Eucharist" by Isaac B. Woodbury. Additionally, the hymn is often sung to the tune "O Waly Waly" (also known as "The Water Is Wide" a folk melody of Scottish origin from the 1600-1700s). Using this melody for the hymn seems to have become popular since the 1980s.

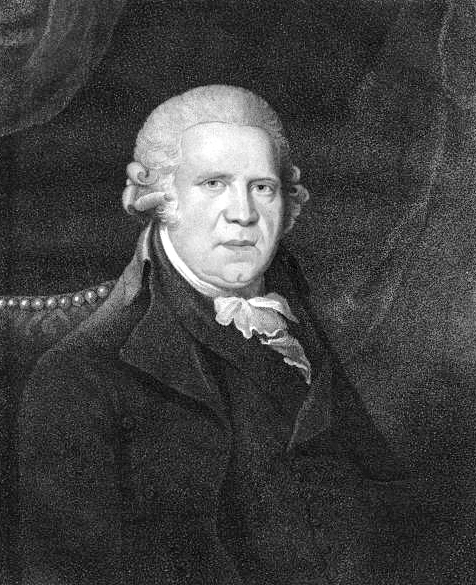
Edward Miller

"Rockingham" was written by Edward Miller, the son of a stone mason who ran away from home to become a musician, being a flautist in Händel's orchestra. It has long been associated with Watts' text in British and Commonwealth hymnals, first being associated with the text in the seminal Hymns Ancient and Modern (1861), and appearing again in the 1906 English Hymnal:

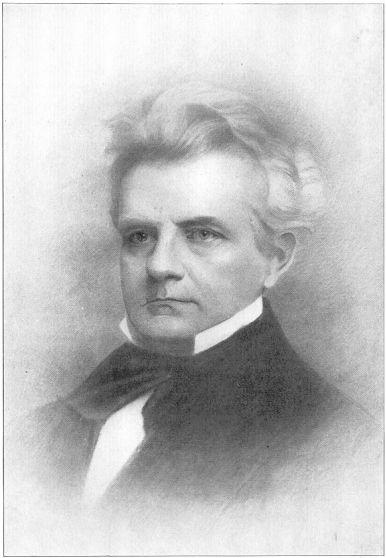
Lowell Mason

"Hamburg" is an adaptation of a plainchant melody by American composer Lowell Mason, and it remains the most frequent pairing in the United States. First written in 1824 and published a year later, it was not set to this text until The Sabbath Hymn and Tune Book (1859), and even then it did not gain wide traction until late in the 19th century. Paul Westermeyer notes, however, that the tune is sometimes seen as less than an ideal match for the text, and that it is "dull to the analyst, but often appreciated by congregations."

== Other uses ==
- Sung to the tune 'Rockingham', it has been used for many years by the BBC to introduce its 7am broadcast on Good Friday.
- It forms the musical setting for the culmination of a passion play told in dance choreographed by Walter Nicks, an American modern dancer.
- Contemporary Christian worship artists Matt Redman and Chris Tomlin recorded it as "The Wonderful Cross" for the latter's debut album The Noise We Make, with an added chorus that follows a markedly contemporary format. Redman, though English, sings the traditional verses to the tune of "Hamburg."
- Showbread, a Christian "Raw Rock" band, used excerpts of the lyrics in their song "The Beginning" from the album Nervosa.
- The tune is briefly quoted by Charles Ives in his Symphony No. 2 (Ives).
- On their album Journey into the Morn, Scottish prog rock band Iona present a version using the tune Amazing Grace.
- An orchestral version is used as the background song for The Chosen's season 6 teaser
