= Johann Samuel Schroeter =

German composer and pianist

Johann Samuel Schroeter or Schröter (2 March 1753 – 2 November 1788) was a German pianist and composer, active in London from 1772.

== Life ==
Schröter was born in Guben to Johann Friedrich Schröter (1724–1811), an oboist for Augustus III of Poland, the Elector of Saxony, and his wife Marie Regine Hefter (died 1766); the family were brought up as musicians, with Corona Schröter being his elder sister. After 1763, they were in Leipzig and taught by Johann Adam Hiller. In 1771 and 1772, they were in London, where Johann Samuel Schröter remained.

Initially, organist at the Royal German Chapel, Schröter became a protege of Johann Christian Bach. With connections to the court, he became a celebrated pianist. In 1782, after Bach's death, he became music-master to the Queen. He fell ill in 1786 and died in 1788.

== Works ==
Through William Napier of Strand, London and others, Schröter published a range of compositions, including piano and flute/violin sonatas, piano trios, and piano concertos. In the summer of 1778, Wolfgang Amadeus Mozart became acquainted with Schröter's Six Clavier Concertos, Op. 3, and called them "very fine." Mozart wrote cadenzas for three of them, and the influence of these works can be discerned on some of Mozart's later piano concertos, including notably the Andante of the Double Piano Concerto of 1779. The pianist Murray Perahia recorded the third of these concertos for Sony.

== Family ==
In 1775, Schröter married, against the family's wishes, Rebecca Scott, daughter of the late Robert Scott (died 1771), a merchant, and his wife Elizabeth. The match led to litigation over Rebecca's marriage portion.
