= Semyon Raich =

Russian poet and translator

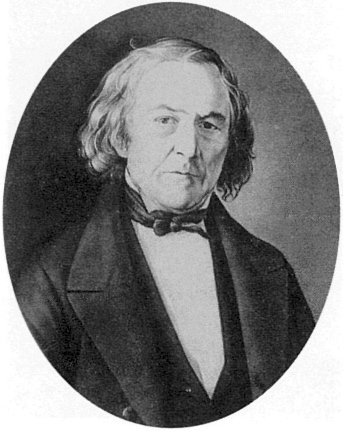
Portrait of Semyon Raich

Semyon Egorovich Raich (Russian: Семён Егорович Раич) (26 September [O.S. 15 September] 1792 – 9 November [O.S. 28 October] 1855) was a Russian poet and translator, who worked as a teacher at the boarding house of Moscow University. He published such literary miscellanies as Northern lyre (Северная лира), Galateya (Галатея) and others. He was a tutor of the great Russian poet Fyodor Ivanovich Tyutchev.
