= Pfeffel family =

Bavarian-German noble family

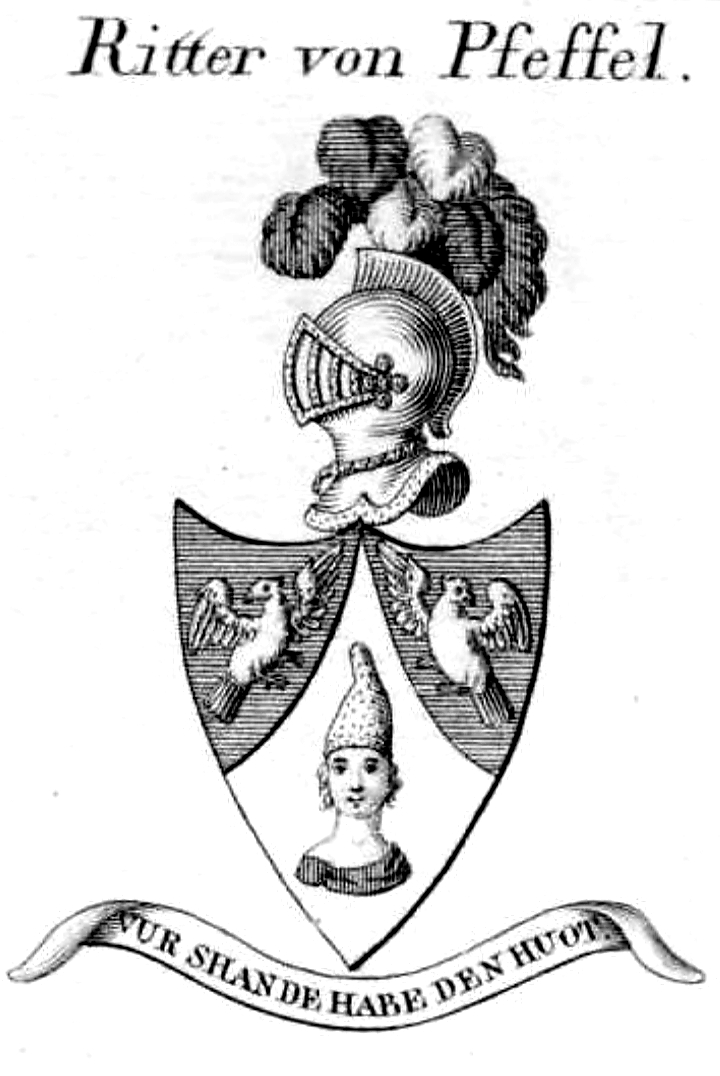
Coat of arms of the Pfeffel family

The Pfeffel family (ennobled as von Pfeffel) is a Bavarian-German noble family originally from Neuburg an der Donau in Bavaria. Some family members were ennobled in the Kingdom of Bavaria in the 19th century. The family's history was explored in the BBC series Who Do You Think You Are?, relating to Boris Johnson (whose full name is Alexander Boris de Pfeffel Johnson).

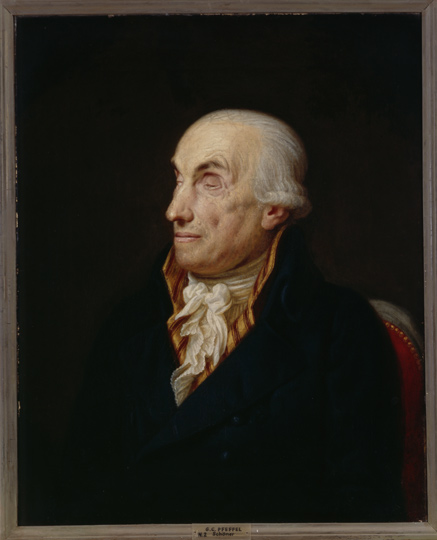
Gottlieb Konrad Pfeffel

The family is descended from the watchman Johannes Pfeffel (1580–1634) of Neuburg an der Donau. His son Conrad Pfeffel (born 1605) was a tailor in Augsburg, and was the father of a pastor in Freiburg im Breisgau Johann Conrad Pfeffel (1636–1701). The latter's son Johann Conrad Pfeffel (1682–1738) moved from Freiburg to nearby Colmar in Alsace, where he served as Buergermeister (mayor) for half a year in 1727. He was the father of the historian, lawyer and diplomat Christian Friedrich Pfeffel von Kriegelstein (1726–1807) and the writer Gottlieb Konrad Pfeffel (1736–1809).

Christian Friedrich's son Christian Hubert Pfeffel von Kriegelstein (1765–1834) served as the Envoy of the Kingdom of Bavaria to the United Kingdom and was raised to the rank of Freiherr (Free Lord, equivalent to Baron) in his native Bavaria. He was the father of Baroness Ernestine von Pfeffel (1810–1894), who married in 1839 Fyodor Tyutchev (one of the most famous Russian poets and member of the Tyutchev noble family), and Freiherr Karl Maximilian Friedrich Hubert Pfeffel von Krigenstein (born 1811 in Dresden, died 1890 in Munich) who married Karoline von Rottenburg, a natural daughter of Prince Paul of Württemberg.

Among the children of Karl Maximilian was Freiherr Christian Hubert Theodor Marie Karl von Pfeffel (born 1843 in Munich, died 1922 in Paris), who married Hélène Arnous de Rivière (1862–1951) and had his name changed to de Pfeffel when he settled in France. They were the parents of Marie-Louise de Pfeffel (1882–1944), the great-grandmother of former British prime minister Boris Johnson, and of Yvonne de Pfeffel (born 1883 in Paris, died 1959 in Truro, Cornwall), the first female French Open doubles champion.

A mummified corpse of a woman buried in the Barfüsser Church in Basel, Switzerland, was identified in 2018, 43 years after the discovery, as Anna Catharina Bischoff (1719–1787), the mother-in-law of Christian Friedrich Pfeffel von Kriegelstein (1726–1807).

The Pastor Johann Conrad Pfeffel was married four times. The pastor had four wives: Magdalena Tolotti (1637–1662), Jakobina Steinnagel (1629–1667), Helene Böcklin (c. 1640–1680) and Susanna Hartmann (1655–1720) and he had many other children from four marriages: Johann Konrad Pfeffel (1662–1668), Maria Magdalena Pfeffel (1667–1667), Maria Christiane Pfeffel (1668–1668), Johann Andreas Pfeffel (1670–1673), Johann Friedrich Pfeffel (b. 1672) and engraver and art publisher Johann Andreas Pfeffel (1674–1748), who was a father of engraver Johann Andreas Pfeffel Jr. (1715–1768).
