= Tyutchev (family) =

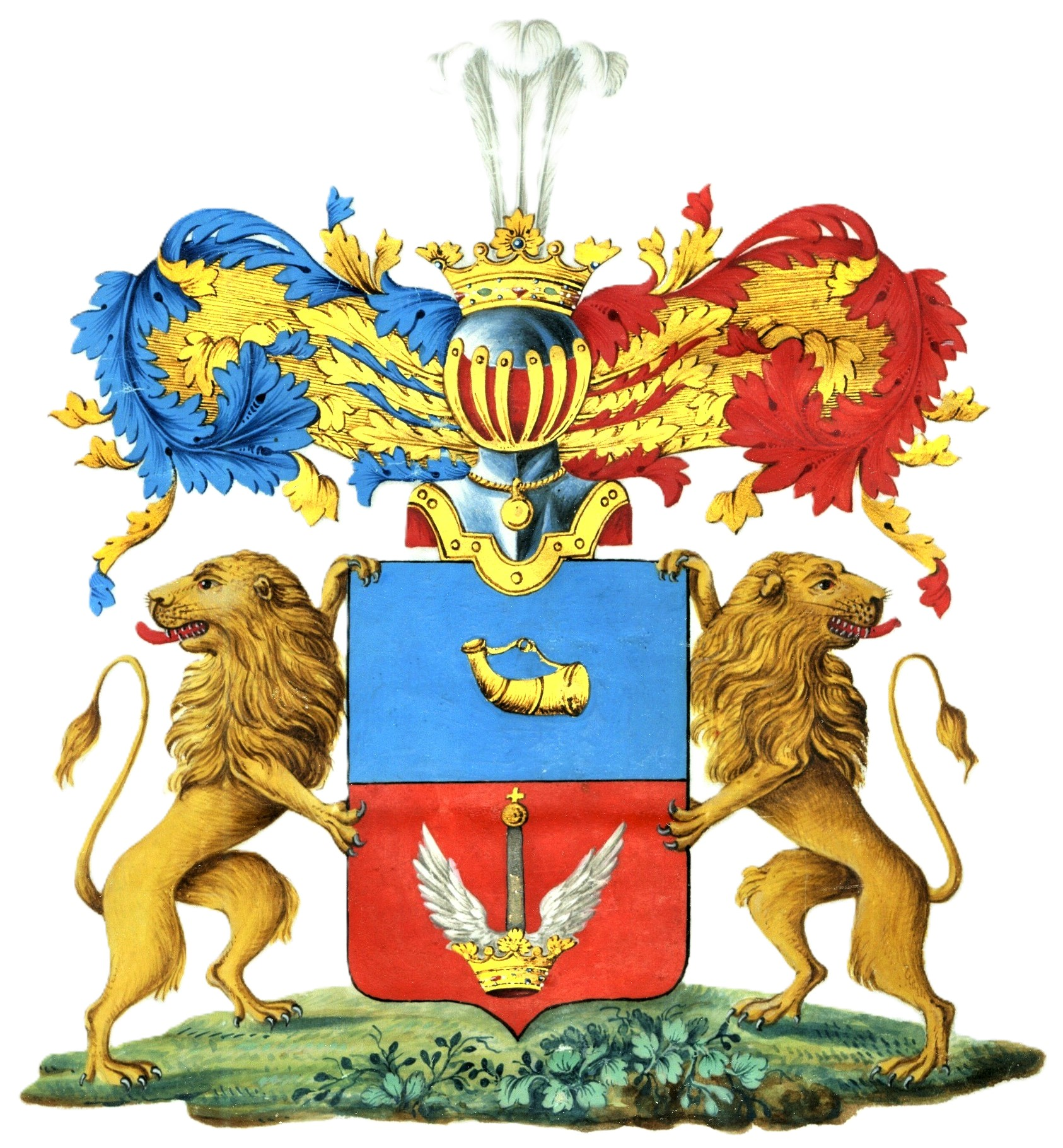
Coat of Arms of Tyutchev family

The Tyutchevs are an ancient Russian noble family of which there are two branches, those descending from Zakhary Tyutchev (born 1360) and those descending from Ignatius Tyutchev, a zhiltsy who were likely related.

Included among the documents submitted to inclusion of the family in the Velvet Book, a genealogical list of the Tyutchevs and a patrimonial grant from Tsar Michael Feodorovich to Tretyak Vasilievich Tyutchev for the village of Podyakovo within the Ryazan district were submitted.

The family was included in Part IV of the Book of Noble Genealogy of the Moscow, Tambov, Ryazan, Oryol, and Yaroslavl Governates.

== Origins ==
According to historian Boris Unbegaun, the name Tyutchev is of Turkic origin and means 'player of the shepherd's horn'.

The The Tale of the Battle with Mamai mentions Zakhary Tyutchev, the earliest known member of the family. He was Dmitry Donskoy's envoy to Mamai and participant in the battle.

=== Early Members ===
- Boris Matveyevich Tyutchev was a voivode in Suzdal and defeated the Novgorodians on the Shilenga River in 1471.
- Konstantin Zakharyevich Tyutchev the Sorroful and his brother Andrei Zakharyevich Tyutchev died in the Battle of Kazan, 1847
- Mikhail Feodorovich Tyutchev and Boris Leontyevich Tyutchev accompanied Elena Ivanovna of Moscow to Lithuania in 1495
- Nikita Ivanovich Tyutchev was a voicode in Vereya (1623-1624) and in Borisov (1627-1628)
- Boris Ivanovich Tyutchev was a voivode in Kashin and Ustyuzhna Zheleznopolskaya under Tsar Mikhail Feodorovich
  - Nikita Borisovich Tyutchev was a voivode in Belozersk (1657)
- Faddey Petrovich Tyutchev (1715-1787), the richest landowner in Bryansk, known for organising a celebration following the execution of Burkhard Christoph von Münnich. A contemporary wrote:

I heard how the enitre Tyutchev family, having gathered from different houses to visit - men, women, young men, young woman and small children - cursed the memory of Field Marshal Minich for the fact that, under the guise of service, for his own supposedly personal insult, he ordered the execution of Colonel Tyutchev during the reign of Anna Ioannovna.

== Later Members ==
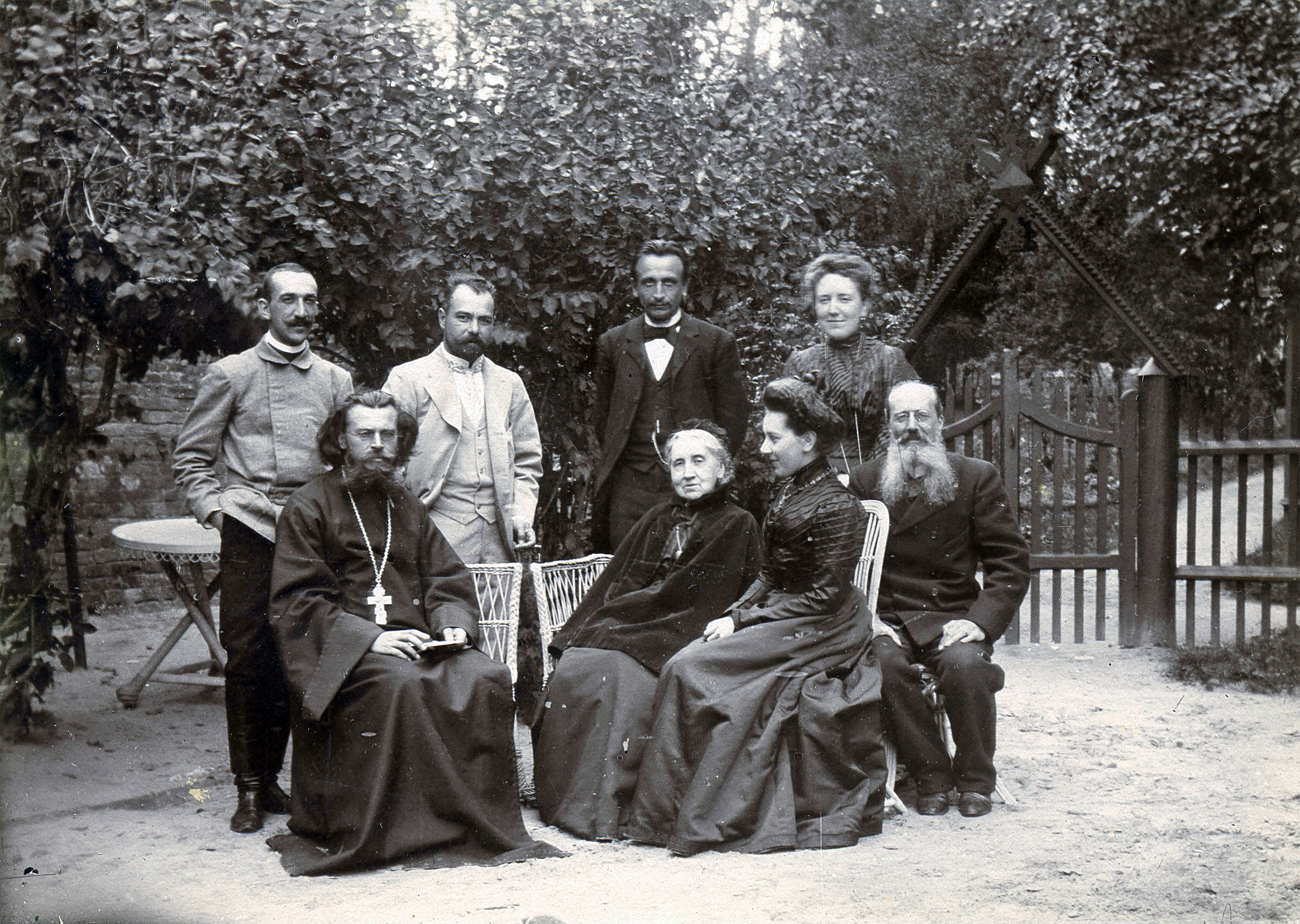
The Tyutchevs and their guests at the main estate house in Muranovo (1900)

- Andrei Danilovich Tyutchev, a captain
  - Nikolai Andreevich Tyutchev (1738-1937), a Second major
    - Dmitry Nikolaevich Tyutchev (1765-1829), a poet
    - Nikolai Nikolaevich Tyutchev (1767-1832)
      - Sergei Nikolaevich Tyutchev (1820-1898), actual state councillor
        - Nikolai Sergeevich Tyutchev (1856-1924), historian and Narodnik, had issue
    - Ivan Nikolaevich Tyutchev (1768-1846), court councillor
      - Nikolai Ivanovich Tyutchev (1801-)
      - Fyodor Ivanovich Tyutchev (1803-1873), famous russian poet and diplomat
        - Anna Feodorovona Tyutcheva (1829-1889), maid of honour, married Ivan Aksakov
        - Daria Feodorovna Tyutcheva (1834 - 1903), maid of honour
        - Ekaterina Feodorovna Tyutcheva (1835–1882), maid of honour
        - Maria Fedorovna Tyutcheva (1840-1873) married Nikolai Birilev, had issue
        - Dmitry Fedorovich Tyutchev (1841-1870) married Olga Melnikova, had issue
        - Ivan Fedorovich Tyutchev (1846-1909) married Olga Putyata, had issue
      - Daria Nikolaevna Tyutcheva (1806-)
    - Anastasia Nikolaeva Tyutcheva (1769-1830)
    - Varvara Nikolaevna Tyutcheva (1771-1828)
    - Evdokia Nikolaevna Tyutcheva (1774-1837), married Prince Boris Meshchersky, later an abbess
    - Nadezhda Nikolaevna Tyutcheva (1775-1850)
