= Ekaterina Tyutcheva =

Maid of empress Maria Alexandrovna

Ekaterina Fedorovna Tyutcheva
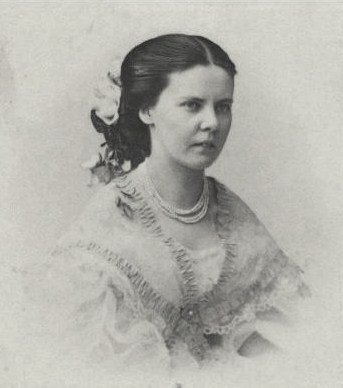
- Born: 27 October 1835
- Died: 11 March 1882 (46 years old)
- Noble family: Tyutchev
- Father: Fyodor Tyutchev
- Mother: Countess Emilia Eleanor Sophie Louise Christina Bothmer

Ekaterina Fedorovna Tyutcheva (1835–1882) was a maid of honour of Empress Maria Alexandrovna, writer, and third daughter of the poet Fyodor Tyutchev from his first marriage to Eleanor Peterson.

== Biography ==
After the death of her mother in her childhood, Ekaterina was brought up partly in the house of her maternal aunt, and partly at the Munich Women's Institute. In 1845, together with her sisters, they moved to their father in Saint Petersburg and continued her education at the Smolny Institute of Noble Maidens. From 1851, she lived with her father's family, and from 1853, she lived with her aunt, Darai Sushkova (née Tyutcheva), wife of the writer Nikolai Vasilyevich Shuskov. According to a contemporary writer:

"Kitty Tyutcheva really enlivened the Sushkovs' salon. She was a girl of remarkable intelligence and education, she had a pleasant appearance, lively black eyes; with a firm mind, she was of a restrained character, but did not possess that feminine grace that serves as an attractive force for men. And since her demands were naturally high, it was difficult for her to find a mate. She outlived the old people and died without marrying."

In 1857, the young Leo Tolstoy was fascinated by her, writing in his diary: “Tyutcheva begins to calmly like me ... Slowly, but seizes me seriously and everything,” though the relationship didn't amount to anything. Prince Pyotr Vyazemsky dedicated one of his poems to Ekaterina Tyutcheva "Evening". As Count S. D. Sheremetev wrote:

"Worthy and rare, well-educated, outstanding woman. She was the soul of her aunt's salon and an attractive element to him, with which everyone reckoned. She conducted a variety of correspondence with prominent people of her time. She had a mind and a heart. Pobedonostsev kept in constant correspondence with her. Her death was very sensitive to him."

She engaged herself with journalisim and translations. She translated of Metropolitan Philaret, which were published in London in 1873.

She spent her last years in the Varvarino estate she bought, where she organized a public school, wrote textbooks for peasant children, and in 1882 built a veterinary clinic and donated 10 thousand rubles for its maintenance. Her sister, Anna's husband, publicist and writer Ivan Aksakov joined her there in exile in 1878.

She died on 11 March 1882. Two years later, her Stories from the Sacred History of the Old and New Testaments were printed in Moscow.
