= Eleonora Fyodorovna Tyutcheva =

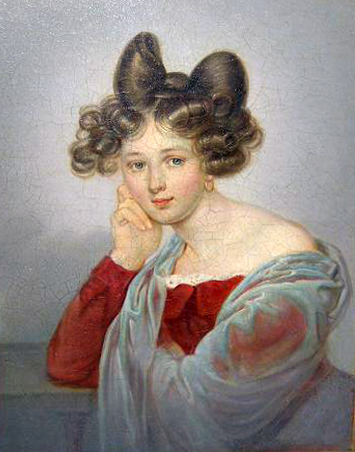
- Born: Countess Emilia Eleonora Sophia Louise Christina von Bothmer; 19 October 1800; Kassel
- Died: 27 August 1838 (aged 37); Turin, Sardinia
- Spouses: Alexander Khristoforovich Peterson; Fyodor Tyutchev
- Issue: Karl Alexandrovich Peterson; Otto Alexandrovich Peterson; Alexander Alexandrovich Peterson; Alfred Alexandrovich Peterson; Anna Fedorovna Tyutcheva; Daria Fedorovna Tyutcheva; Ekaterina Fedorovna Tyutcheva
- Father: Count Karl-Heinrich-Ernest von Bothmer
- Mother: Baroness Anna von Hanstein
- Occupation: Writer

Countess Emilia Eleanor Sophie Louise Christina von Bothmer (German: Emilia Eleonore Sophie Louise Christine Gräfin von Bothmer; 19 October 1800 – 27 August 1838) married twice, first to Active State Councillor Alexander Peterson, and secondly to poet Fyodor Tyutchev.

== Biography ==
Eleonora was born into the German noble House of Bothmer, as a daughter of a German Diplomat, Count Karl-Heinrich-Ernest von Bothmer (1770–1845) and his wife, Barones Anna von Hanstein (1777–1826). She was their eldest child, and would later have eight brothers and three sisters. The family often travelled with their father to Italy, France, and Switzerland. Eleonora and her sisters all received a traditional home education, by the age of sixteen she had become a beautiful socialite with impeccable manners, fluent in both German and French. She was considered by many to be "infinitely charming".

In 1818, Eleonora became the wife of a Russian diplomat, then secretary of the Russian mission in Munich, Alexander Khristoforovich Peterson (1759–1825). He died in 1825, leaving her widowed with four sons. She had a modest house in Munich on Karolinenplatz opposite the Russian mission. At a social evening, hosted by the mission the following year, the countess met Fyodor Tyutchev, who had arrived at the Bavarian embassy as an assistant to the secretary. The couple fell in love quickly and married secretly in March 1826.

=== Second Marriage ===
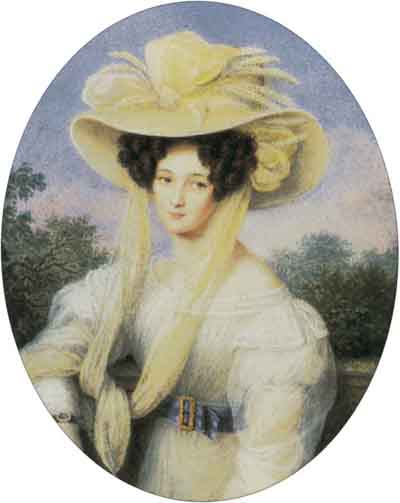
Eleonora Tyutcheva Watercolor by J. Scheler. c. 1827

For two years following the marriage, according to Heinrich Heine, many in Munich did not know about the wedding (the legal marriage took place 27 January 1829). The marriage was happy, years later, Fyodor would say:

"Never would a person have become so loved by another person as I am loved by her, for eleven years there was not a single day in her life when, in order to strengthen my happiness, she would not agree, without a moment's hesitation, to die for me."

In 1830, Eleonora and her family spent half a year in Russia where she was warmly received by the whole Tyutchev family. Dorothea de Ficquelmont describes the couple during this time:

"I forgot to mention the meeting with one beautiful woman – Madame Tyutcheva ... She is still young, but so pale, fragile, with such a sad look that she can be mistaken for a beautiful vision. She is clever, and seems to me with a certain pretension to wit, which does not fit well with her ethereal air; her husband is a small man with glasses, very ugly, but he speaks well."

Eleonora's letters to her relatives depict her as a loving, sensitive woman who idolised her husband, it appears that she was unfamiliar with the business and economics of family life which were entirely her responsibility. In Munich, she managed to create a cozy and hospitable home. Though, due to Tyutchev's modest salary and small financial assistance of his parents, she could barely make ends meet. Despite this, the first seven years of their married life were happy.

In February 1833, at the ball, Fyodor Tyutchev first met with Baroness Ernestina Dernberg, who would later become his second wife.

Realising her husband's straying eye, Eleanora did everything she could to save her family, but it was to no avail. She grew depressed and in May 1836, she attempted to commit suicide by stabbing herself several times with a dagger. She did not succeed, as the dagger she used, was from a fancy dress costume. Seeing the blood, she ran out into the street in a panic, and fell unconscious. Neighbours brought her home and were soon joined by Fyodor. She would physically recover but would struggle with her mental health. Tyutchev appeared to swear to his wife that he would break off relations with his mistress and the couple agreed to leave Munich. The family left for Russia in May 1837 for a four-month holiday.

Shortly after their arrival in Saint Petersburg, Fyodor was appointed an official of the Russian diplomatic mission in Turin, capital of the Kingdom of Sardinia. Once Fyodor left for Sardinia, he resumed his affair with Baroness Ernesta.

On 14 May 1838 Eleanora and her three daughters sailed to Turin, intending to board a steamboat to Lübeck from there to Turin by carriage. On the night of 18 May, a fire broke out on the ship near Lübeck, all attempts to extinguish the flames failed. The captain drove the ship aground and passengers attempted to cross to the rocky shore, not without loss. Five people died, and the ship burned to ruin. Eleanora was calm and showed self-control and presence of mind.

Tyutchev described the behaviour of his wife during this time:

"It can be said in all fairness that the children twice owed their lives to their mother, who, at the cost of her last remaining strength, was able to carry them through the flames and wrest them from death."

Eleanor did not receive any physical injuries during the shipwreck, but would go into shock, requiring treatment and rest. However, she refused to stay in Germany for more than two weeks, fearing for her husband, and left for Turin. Upon arrival, the family found themselves in a strict financial situation, due to money and official documents lost in the shipwreck. They settled in the suburbs and despite material assistance provided by the treasury, they found it very difficult to persevere. Eleanora went to auction to help improve their finances by purchasing cheap furniture. Tyutchev was a poor helper in this aspect, his wife herself noticing his "irritable and melancholy mood". She deliberately kept the details and anxieties of the family's finances from him to try and improve his mood.

Before long, stress from overworking, a severe cold, and a deep nervous shock which she was never able to recover from, contributed to worsening her already fragile health. On 27 August 1838, she died in much pain. Fyodor grieved deeply, spending nights at the tomb of his wife, and his hair turned grey.

== Issue ==
Eleanora had seven children. From her first marriage to Alexander Khristoforovich Peterson (1759–1825):

- Carl Alexandrovich Peterson (1819–1875 )
- Otto Alexandrovich Peterson (1820–1883)
- Alexander Alexandrovich Peterson (1823—?)
- Alfred Alexandrovich Peterson (1825–1860)

Her eldest three sons graduated from the Naval Cadet Corps in St. Petersburg, the youngest was brought up in Munich.

From her second marriage to Fyodor Ivanovich Tyutchev (1803–1873):

- Anna Feodorovna Tyutcheva (1829–1889), maid of honor and memoirist
- Daria Feodorovna Tyutcheva (1834–1903), maid of honor
- Catherine Feodorovna Tyutcheva (1835–1882), maid of honor
