= Fyodor Tyutchev =

Russian poet (1803–1873)

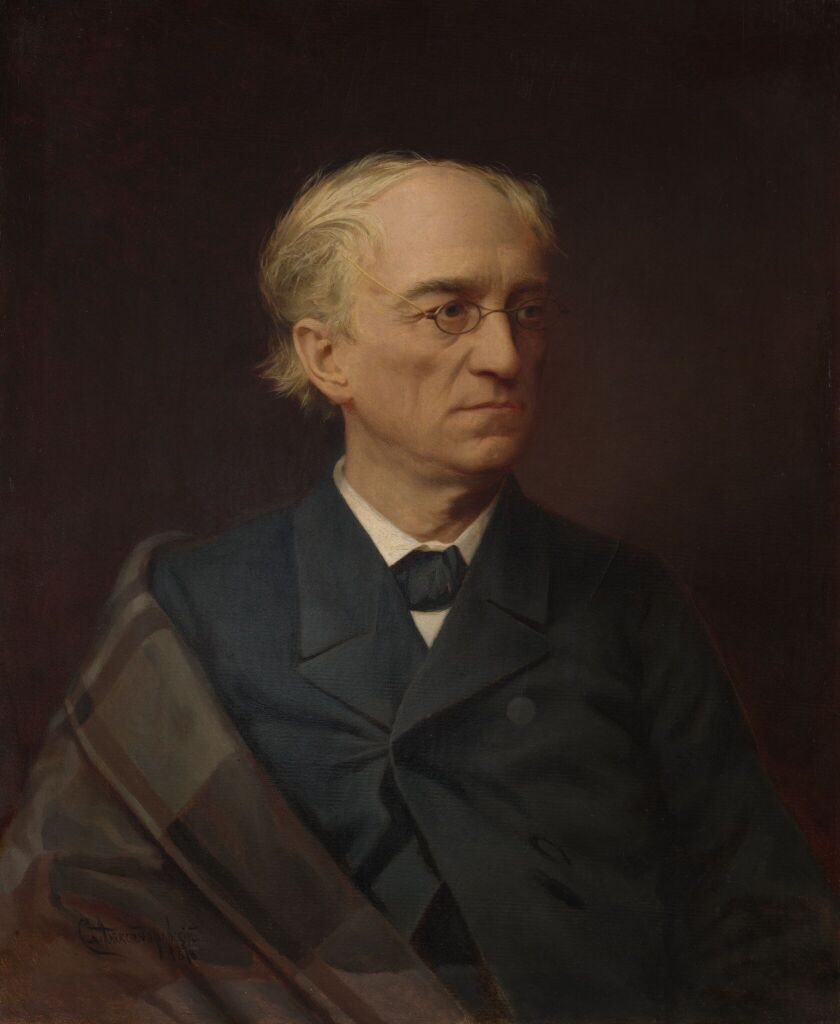
- Posthumous portrait by Stepan Alexandrovsky, 1876
- Born: Fyodor Ivanovich Tyutchev; 5 December [O.S. 23 November] 1803; Ovstug near Bryansk, Oryol Governorate, Russian Empire
- Died: 27 July [O.S. 15 July] 1873 (aged 69); Saint Petersburg, Russian Empire
- Noble family: Tyutchev
- Spouses: Eleonore Peterson; Ernestine von Pfeffel
- Issue: Anna Tyutcheva; Daria Tyutcheva; Ekaterina Tyutcheva; Maria Tyutcheva; Dimitri Tyutchev; Ivan Tyutchev; Elena Tyutcheva; Fydor Tyutchev; Nikolai Tyutchev; Nikolai Lapp-Mikhailov; Dmitry Lapp
- Occupation: Poet

Fyodor Ivanovich Tyutchev (Russian: Фёдор Ива́нович Тю́тчев, IPA: [ˈfʲɵdər ɨˈvanəvʲɪtɕ ˈtʲʉtːɕɪf]; (Note: Pre-Reform orthography: Ѳедоръ Ивановичъ Тютчевъ) 5 December [O.S. 23 November] 1803 – 27 July [O.S. 15 July] 1873) was a Russian poet and diplomat.

== Ancestry ==
Tyutchev was born into an old Russian noble family in the Ovstug family estate near Bryansk (modern-day Zhukovsky District, Bryansk Oblast of Russia). His father Ivan Nikolaevich Tyutchev (1768—1846) was a court councillor who served in the Kremlin Expedition that managed all building and restoration works of Moscow palaces. One of Ivan's sisters, Princess Yevdokia Nikolaevna Meshcherskaya (1774—1837), was a hegumenia famous for founding the Borisoglebsky Anosin Women's Monastery. The Tyutchevs traced their roots to Zakhariy Tutchev mentioned in The Tale of the Rout of Mamai, a 15th-century epic tale about the Battle of Kulikovo that described him as the most trusted man of Dmitry Donskoy; sent as a messenger to Mamai, he managed to reveal traitors and return alive thanks to his diplomatic skills. Fyodor's mother Countess Ekaterina Lvovna Tolstaya (1776—1866) belonged to the Tolstoy family on her father's side and the Rimsky-Korsakov noble house on her mother's side. Russian war general Alexander Rimsky-Korsakov was her uncle.

== Biography ==
Most of his childhood years were spent in Moscow, where he joined the literary circle of Professor Merzlyakov at the age of 13. His first printed work was a translation of Horace's epistle to Maecenas, published when he was still 15. From that time on, his poetic language was distinguished from that of Pushkin and other contemporaries by its liberal use of majestic, solemn Slavonic archaisms.

His family tutor was Semyon Raich, a minor poet and translator under whose guidance Tyutchev undertook his first poetic steps. From 1819 to 1821 Tyutchev studied at the Philological Faculty of Moscow University. After graduating he joined the Foreign Office and in 1822 accompanied his relative, Count Ostermann-Tolstoy, to Munich to take up a post as trainee diplomat at the Russian legation. He was to remain abroad for 22 years.

In Munich he fell in love with Amalie von Lerchenfeld, the illegitimate half-sister of a young Bavarian diplomat, Count Maximilian Joseph von Lerchenfeld. Tyutchev's poem Tears or Slyozy (Liubliu, druz'ya, laskat' ochami...) coincides with one of their meetings, and is most likely dedicated to Amalie (or Amélie, as she was usually known). Among other poems inspired by her are K. N., and Ia pomniu vremia zolotoe… Published extracts from the letters and diaries of Maximilian von Lerchenfeld illuminate the first years of Tyutchev as a diplomat in Munich (1822–1826), giving details of his frustrated love affair for Amélie, nearly involving a duel (probably with his colleague, Baron Alexander von Krüdener), in January 1825. Amélie was coerced by her relatives into marrying the much older Krüdener, but she and Tyutchev continued to be friends and frequented the same diplomatic society in Munich. A late poem of 1870 with the title K.B. (Ia vstretil vas — i vsio biloe), long accepted on dubious evidence as addressed to Amélie, is now thought much more likely to refer to Tyutchev's sister-in-law Clotilde (or Klothilde) von Bothmer. Tyutchev's last meeting with Amélie took place on March 31, 1873 (OS) when she visited him on his deathbed. The next day, Tyutchev wrote to his daughter Daria:

Yesterday I felt a moment of burning emotion due to my meeting with... my dear Amalie Krüdener who wished to see me for the last time in this world and came to take her leave of me. In her person my past and the best years of my life came to give me a farewell kiss.

In Munich, he came under the influence of the German Romantic movement, and this is reflected in his poetry. Among the figures, he knew personally were the poet Heinrich Heine and the philosopher Friedrich Schelling. In 1826, he married Eleonore Peterson, née Countess von Bothmer, the Bavarian widow of a Russian diplomat, secretary of the Russian mission in Munich, Alexander Khristoforovich Peterson (1759-1825). She became the mother of his daughter Anna Tyutcheva. Following her death in 1838, Tyutchev married another aristocratic young German widow, Baroness Ernestine von Dörnberg, née von Pfeffel, who had become his mistress and had a child by him while Eleonore was still alive. Neither of his wives understood Russian to begin with (Ernestine made efforts to learn the language only much later). That is hardly surprising since Tyutchev spoke French better than Russian and nearly all his private correspondence was in the former language.

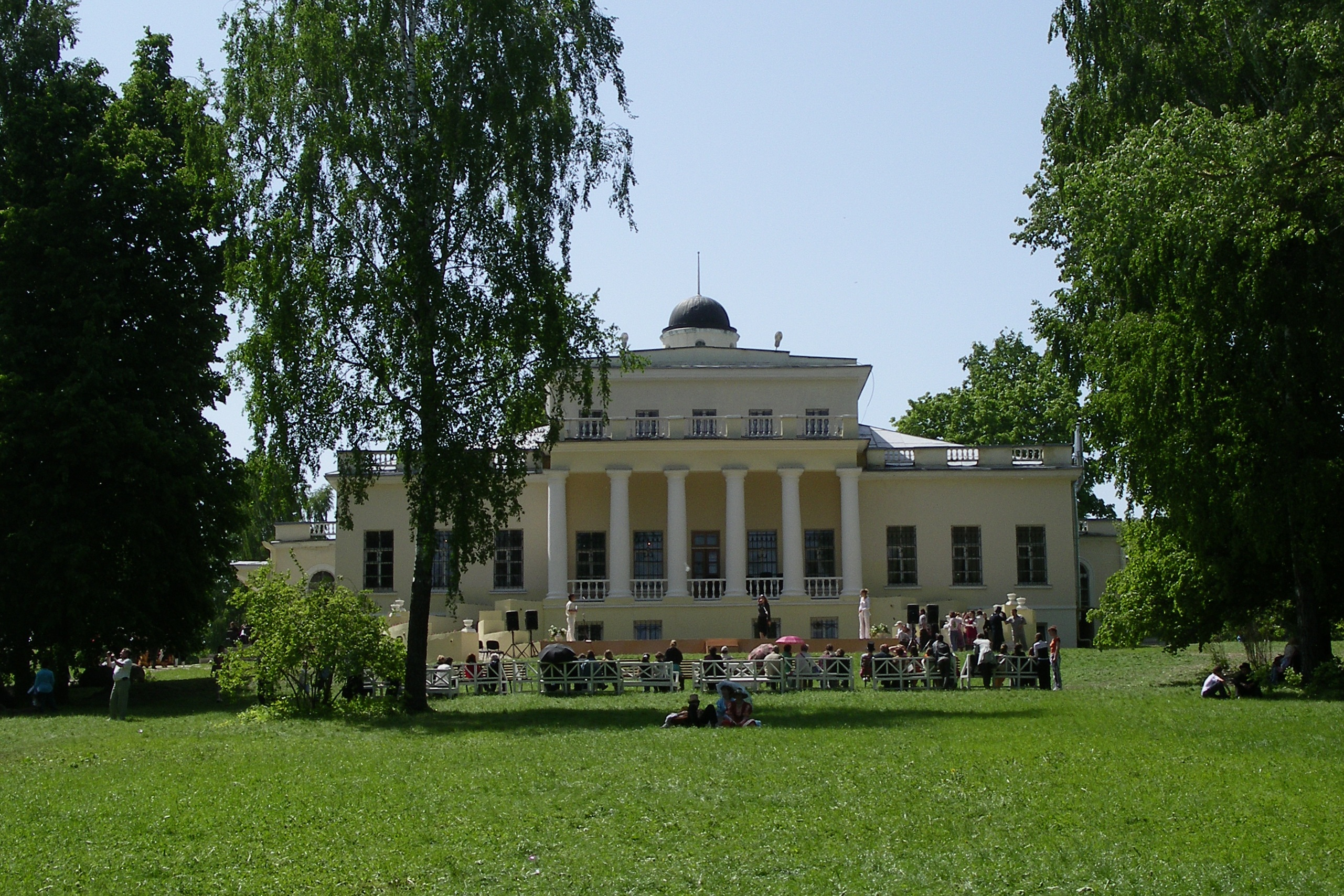
The manor of Tyutchev's father in the Bryansk region

In 1836, a young former colleague at the Munich legation, Prince Ivan Gagarin, obtained Tyutchev's permission to publish his selected poems in Sovremennik, a literary journal edited by Pushkin. Although appreciated by the great Russian poet, the superb lyrics failed to spark off any public interest. The death of Eleonore in 1838 hit Tyutchev hard and appears to have silenced him as a poet for some considerable time, and for ten years afterwards, he wrote hardly any lyric verse. Instead, he turned his attention to publishing political articles in Western periodicals such as the Revue des Deux Mondes outlining his strongly held views on Russia's role in the world (see below).

In 1837, Tyutchev was transferred from Munich to the Russian legation in Turin. He found his new place of residence uncongenial to his disposition and after marrying Ernestine, he resigned from his position there to settle in Munich. It was later discovered that Tyutchev had actually abandoned his post as chargé d'affaires in Turin without official permission to marry in Switzerland, and he was dismissed from the Foreign Service as a result. He continued to live in Germany for five more years without position before returning to Russia. Upon his eventual return to St Petersburg in 1844, the poet was much lionised in the highest society. His daughter Kitty caused a sensation, and the novelist Leo Tolstoy wooed her, "almost prepared to marry her impassively, without love, but she received me with studied coldness", as he remarked in a diary. Kitty would later become influential at Konstantin Pobedonostsev's circle at the Russian court. Not long after his return to Russia, Tyutchev was reinstated in government service as a censor, rising eventually to become Chairman of the Foreign Censorship Committee and a Privy Councillor.

Tyutchev loved to travel, often volunteering for diplomatic courier missions as a way of combining business with pleasure. One of his lengthiest and most significant missions was to newly independent Greece in the autumn of 1833. During his years abroad there were visits home on leave, and after settling in Russia in 1844, he would sometimes spend short periods on the family estate at Ovstug. Tours undertaken in a private capacity took him to many parts of continental Europe, including Italy, France, Germany, Austria and Switzerland. He was particularly drawn to the Swiss lakes and mountains. Many of his best poems were inspired by such journeys.

As a poet, Tyutchev was little known during his lifetime. His 400 or so short poems were the only pieces he ever wrote in Russian. Tyutchev regarded his poems as bagatelles, not worthy of publication. He generally did not care to write them down and, if he did, he would often lose the papers they were scribbled upon. Nikolay Nekrasov, when listing Russian poets in 1850, praised Tyutchev as one of the most talented among "minor poets". It was only in 1854 that his first volume of verse was printed, which was prepared by Ivan Turgenev and others without any help from the author.

In 1850, he began an illicit affair with Elena Denisyeva, over twenty years his junior. She remained his mistress until her death from tuberculosis in 1864; they had three children. The affair produced a body of lyrics rightly considered among the finest love poems in the language. Permeated with a sublime feeling of subdued despair, the so-called "Denisyeva Cycle" has been variously described by critics as "a novel in verse", "a human document, shattering in the force of its emotion", and "a few songs without comparison in Russian, perhaps even in world poetry". One of the poems, Last Love, is often cited as emblematic of the whole cycle.

In the early 1870s, the deaths of his brother, son and daughter left Tyutchev deeply depressed. (Depression was something from which he suffered at intervals throughout his life.) Following a series of strokes, he died in Tsarskoye Selo in 1873 and was interred at Novodevichy Monastery in St. Petersburg. Ernestine survived him by 21 years.

== Issue ==
Children by his first wife, Countess Eleonora von Bothmer are (1800-1838):

- Anna Fedorovna Tyutcheva (1829-1889) maid of honour and memoirist, married Ivan Aksakov.
- Daria Fedorovna Tyutcheva (1834-1903) maid of honor, never married.
- Ekaterina Fedorovna Tyutcheva (1835-1882), maid of honour, never married.

Children by his second wife Baroness Ernestine von Pfeffel are:

- Maria Fedorovna Tyutcheva (1840-1873) married Nikolai Alekseevich Birilev (1829-1882), had issue.
- Dmitry Fedorovich Tyutchev (1841-1870) married Olga Aleksandrovna Melnikova (1830-1913), had issue.
- Ivan Fedorovich Tyutchev (1846-1909) married Olga Petrovna Putyata (1840-1920), had issue.

Children by his mistress of 14 years Elena Alexandrovna Denisyeva (1826-1864) are:

- Elena Fedorovna Tyutcheva (1851-1865)
- Fedor Fedorovich Tyutchev (1860-1916)
- Nikolai Fedorovich Tyutchev (1864-1865)

Children by his mistress Hortense Lapp are:

- Nikolai Lapp-Mikhailov (-1877)
- Dmitry Lapp (-c.1877)

== Political views ==
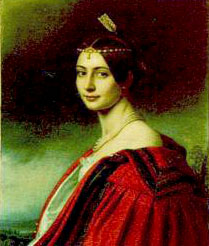
Tyutchev's second wife, Baroness Ernestine von Pfeffel. Her father was a Bavarian Ambassador in Paris and London.

Tyutchev was a militant Pan-Slavist, and as such, never lacked a reason to berate the Western powers—be it the Vatican, the Ottoman Empire, or Poland—the latter perceived by him as playing the role of Judas within the Slavic fold of nations. Additionally, the failure of the Crimean War caused him to view the Russian government with a critical eye.

On domestic matters, he held broadly liberal views. He warmly welcomed most of the reforms of Tsar Alexander II, particularly the Emancipation Reform of 1861. Both in his work as a censor and in his writings, he promoted the ideal of freedom of expression, frequently incurring the wrath of his superiors as a result, even under the more relaxed regime of Alexander II.

His fairly sizeable output of verse on political subjects is largely forgotten. One exception is a short poem which has become something of a popular maxim in Russia:

Who would grasp Russia with the mind?
For her no yardstick was created:
Her soul is of a special kind,
By faith alone appreciated.

(translated by John Dewey)

== Poetry ==
Tyutchev is one of the most memorized and quoted Russian poets. Occasional pieces, translations and political poems constitute about a half of his overall poetical output.

The 200 or so lyric pieces which represent the core of his poetic genius, whether describing a scene of nature or passions of love, put a premium on metaphysics. Tyutchev's world is bipolar—he commonly operates with such categories as night and day, north and south, dream and reality, cosmos and chaos, still world of winter and spring teeming with life. Each of these images is imbued with specific meaning. Tyutchev's idea of night, for example, was defined by critics as "the poetic image often covering economically and simply the vast notions of time and space as they affect man in his struggle through life". In the chaotic and fathomless world of "night", "winter", or "north" man feels himself tragically abandoned and lonely. Hence, a modernist sense of frightening anxiety permeates his poetry. Unsurprisingly, it was not until the late 19th and early 20th century that Tyutchev was rediscovered and hailed as a great poet by the Russian Symbolists such as Vladimir Solovyov, Andrey Bely and Alexander Blok.

== Sample of verse ==
Silentium! is an archetypal poem by Tyutchev. Written in 1830, it is remarkable for its rhythm crafted so as to make reading in silence easier than aloud toward others. Like so many of his poems, its images are anthropomorphic and pulsing with pantheism. As one Russian critic put it, "the temporal epochs of human life, its past and its present fluctuate and vacillate in equal measure: the unstoppable current of time erodes the outline of the present."

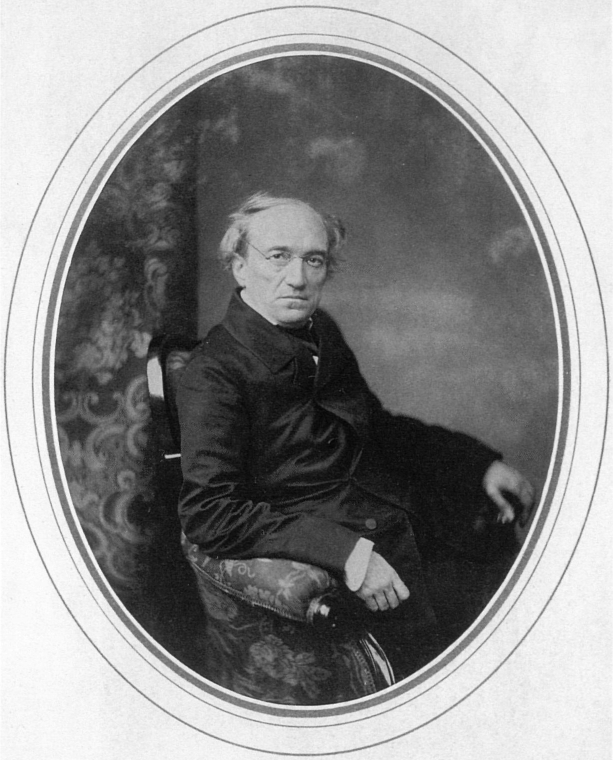
Portrait by Levitsky, 1856.

Speak not, lie hidden, and conceal
the way you dream, the things you feel.
Deep in your spirit let them rise
akin to stars in crystal skies
that set before the night is blurred:
delight in them and speak no word.

How can a heart expression find?
How should another know your mind?
Will he discern what quickens you?
A thought, once uttered, is untrue.
Dimmed is the fountainhead when stirred:
drink at the source and speak no word.

Live in your inner self alone
within your soul a world has grown,
the magic of veiled thoughts that might
be blinded by the outer light,
drowned in the noise of day, unheard...
take in their song and speak no word.

(trans. by Vladimir Nabokov)

== In classical music ==
Incidentally, this poem inspired an early-20th-century composer, Georgi Catoire (the setting of the poem in the song Silentium), while another one of Tyutchev's poems, "O chem ty voesh' vetr nochnoy...", was the inspiration for Nikolai Medtner's Night Wind piano sonata (#7) of 1911. There is a well-known setting by Rakhmaninov of Tyutchev's poem Spring Waters. While the title of Nikolai Myaskovsky's 1910 tone poem, "Silence", may have been borrowed from Tyutchev, the inspiration is credited to one of Edgar Allan Poe's tales. The same poem was also set to music by the 20th-century Russian composer, Boris Tchaikovsky (1925-1996), in his 1974 cantata "Signs of the Zodiac". Composer Lyubov Streicher (1888-1958) set Tyutchev’s text to music in her Romances, as did Ukrainian composer Valentina Ramm. Ukrainian composer Valentyn Sylvestrov (born 1937), has made a memorable setting of 'Last Love', recorded by Alexi Lubimov and Jana Ivanilova on the album 'Stufen'. Tyutchev had an affinity with themes of the night and Julian Cochran set two of Tyutchev's poems related to the night, The Night Wind, and The Night Sea, for soprano and piano. At the end of Andrey Tarkovsky's film Stalker, a character recites a Tyutchev poem.

== See also ==
- Afanasy Fet
- List of 19th-century Russian Slavophiles
