= Rebecca Schroeter =

Rebecca (Scott) Schroeter (1751–1826) was an amateur musician who lived in London during the 18th and early 19th centuries. She was the wife of the German composer Johann Samuel Schroeter, and later, during her years of widowhood, a love interest of Joseph Haydn.

== Early life and marriage ==
She was born in 1751 (baptized 13 May) to Robert Scott, a wealthy Scottish businessman living in London, and his wife Elizabeth. Her father died in 1771, leaving Rebecca an annuity and the future sum of 15,000 pounds, contingent on her marrying with the approval of the executors of the will.

Some time in or before 1775, the family engaged the composer and pianist Johann Schroeter, an immigrant from Germany, as Rebecca's music teacher. By 1775, Johann and Rebecca had fallen in love, and sought to be married—much against the family's wishes. (Their objection hinged on matters of social class: they felt that Schroeter, a mere musical tradesman, was not high enough on the social scale for the daughter of a wealthy family.) The marriage eventually did proceed (17 July 1775), but only with great difficulties. The family tried to get Schroeter to abandon the marriage by offering him the sum of £500, and they also attempted to deprive Rebecca of her £15,000 inheritance (it is not known whether the attempt succeeded.)

The marriage produced no children of which any record has survived. Schroeter continued his musical career but fell into poor health (perhaps, some said at the time, from excessive alcohol consumption). He died either on 1 or 2 November 1788. Mrs. Schroeter continued to live in comfort at No. 6 James Street, Buckingham Gate, where she and her husband had moved in 1786.

== Relationship with Haydn ==
Joseph Haydn, probably the most celebrated composer in Europe in his lifetime, traveled to England during 1791–1792 and 1794–1795, where he led highly successful concerts and composed a number of his best known works, including his last twelve symphonies. He resided in London for most of his stay.

On 29 June 1791, Rebecca Schroeter wrote Haydn a letter, inviting him to give her a music lesson:

Mrs. Schroeter presents her compliments to Mr. Haydn, and informs him, she is just returned to town, and will be very happy to see him whenever it is convenient for him to give her a lesson. James str. Buckingham Gate. Wednesday, June 29th 1791.

Haydn accepted the invitation. This is the first of 22 letters from Mrs. Schroeter to Haydn, which are preserved not in the originals, but in copies made by Haydn in his so-called "second London notebook".

The letters indicate that, just like 16 years earlier, Mrs. Schroeter fell in love with her music teacher. These feelings were evidently reciprocated. Biographer Albert Christoph Dies, who interviewed Haydn in his old age, wrote the following in his 1810 book about Haydn:

I opened up [one of the London notebooks] and found a couple of dozen letters in the English language. Haydn smiled and said: "Letters from an English widow in London, who loved me; but she was, though already 60 years old, still a beautiful and charming woman and I would have married her very easily if I had been free at the time."

This woman is the widow, still living, of the famous pianist Schröter, whose melodious song Haydn emphatically praised... if he was not invited elsewhere, he usually dined with her.

Dies probably garbled the story; in fact it was Haydn who was about 60 at the time; Mrs. Schroeter was only 40.

In saying that he was not "free at the time", Haydn meant that he was married. His marriage to Maria Anna Keller in 1760 was apparently a disaster for both parties, and as divorce does not exist in the Catholic Church, Haydn, as a Catholic, had to continue the marriage. Haydn was also in the breakup phase of a long-term relationship with the singer Luigia Polzelli, whom he had not brought to London with him.

=== Schroeter's letters to Haydn ===
The Schroeter letters express an ardent affection and are often very solicitous of Haydn's welfare.

7 March 1792:

My D[ear]: I was extremely sorry to part with you so suddenly last Night, our conversation was particularly interesting and I had [a] thousand things to say to you, my heart WAS and is full of TENDERNESS for you, but no language can express HALF the LOVE and AFFECTION I feel for you, you are DEARER to me EVERY DAY of my life. ... Oh how earnes[t]ly [I] wish to see you, I hope you will come to me tomorrow. I shall be happy to see you both in the Morning and the Evening. God Bless you my love, my thoughts and best wishes ever accompany you, and I always am with the most sincere and invariable Regard my D:
My Dearest I cannot be happy
till I see you if you know,
do, tell me, when you will come.

19 April 1792:

M[y]: D[ear]: I was extremely sorry to hear this morning that you were indisposed, I am told you was five hours at your Study's yesterday, indeed MY D[ear]: L[ove]: I am afraid it will hurt you why should you who have already produced so many WONDERFUL and CHARMING compositions, still fatigue yourself with such close application.

Mrs. Schroeter was also very supportive of Haydn's career, telling him often how much she appreciated his music.

In the letter of 1 June 1792, biographers have attempted to restore a wording which in the notebook copy was first double-underlined, then heavily crossed out, presumably by Haydn himself. The passage begins:

I hope to see you my Dr L~~e~~ on Tuesday as usual to Dinner xxxx

The "xxxx" indicates the obliterated passage, which is a few words long. A few tails and extenders are visible below and above the obliteration. Inspecting these, H. C. Robbins Landon (1959, 283) and Bartha (1965, 522) read this as "and all (?night ?p.m.) with me,"; Scull (1997), citing additional evidence concerning Haydn's handwriting, prefers the reading "and sleep with me". The passage is (with minor exceptions) the only one which Haydn either double-underlined or obliterated.

Konrad Wolf (1958), examining the letters, notes that they were written with circumspection: "She had been careful ... when writing them, for although she is very free with glowing affirmations of love, she never leaves any clues to her activities, circumstances, acquaintance circles, etc. that could identify her to anyone but the recipient." Robbins Landon adds: "It is surprising that a love affair of these proportions, between the famous Haydn and a lady of London society, managed to escape the gossip hounds of the day; it must have been conducted very discreetly indeed." Both Wolf and Robbins Landon suggest that the reason Haydn made copies of the letters was that Mrs. Schroeter had at some point asked him to return them to her.

=== After 1792 ===
There are no letters following Haydn's departure from England in 1792. On his return in 1794, he rented lodgings at 1 Bury Street, about 10 minutes' walk from Mrs. Schroeter's residence, and biographers conjecture that he continued his relationship with her. The two never saw each other again after 1795, when Haydn departed permanently for his home in Austria.

It seems clear, however, that they parted as friends. Shortly before leaving England for the last time in 1795, Haydn wrote a set of three piano trios (Hob.XV:24, XV:25 and XV:26), considered today by critics as outstanding, and dedicated them to Mrs. Schroeter.

In 1796, she helped Haydn with a business matter, signing (as a witness) a large-scale contract between Haydn and Frederick Augustus Hyde, a music publisher.

In 1800, when the self-published edition of Haydn's famous oratorio The Creation appeared, Mrs. Schroeter's name was on the list of subscribers. This is the last recorded contact, but the fact that Dies knew that Mrs. Schroeter was "still living" when he wrote his 1810 biography (see above) suggests that communication between Mrs. Schroeter and Haydn may have continued after 1800.

== Later life ==
Mrs. Schroeter moved from the James Street house in either 1800 or 1801, was recorded as living in 11 Gloucester Place, Camden Town (part of London) in 1821, and died there at the age of 74 in 1826 (date unknown; burial 7 April).
