= Francis Linley =

English organist and composer

Francis Linley (c.1771–1800) was an English organist and composer.

== Life ==
Linley was born in Doncaster. Blind from birth, he received an education, and studied music under Edward Miller, also of Doncaster.

Around 1790 Linley held the post of organist at St. James's Chapel, Pentonville, London. In 1796 he bought the business of John Bland, music-seller in Holborn. At a troubled time in his life, he went to America. He remained there several years, returning to England in 1799, and died, aged 26, at his mother's house in Doncaster, on 15 September 1800.

== Works ==
Linley's compositions and compiled works included:

- Three Sonatas for Pianoforte and Flute, Op. 1.
- Thirty Familiar Airs for two German Flutes, with prefatory remarks, c. 1790.
- Three Solos for the German Flute, with Accompaniment for Violoncello.
- Through Groves and Flowery Fields, When Angry Nations, and other songs.
- Practical Introduction to the Organ, in five parts, Opus 6, of which the 12th edition appeared about 1810; it contains a description of the organ, fifteen preludes, eight voluntaries, eight full pieces, eight fugues, and psalms.

== Family ==
Linley married a blind woman.
