= Anna Tyutcheva =

Daughter of the poet Fyodor Tyutchev

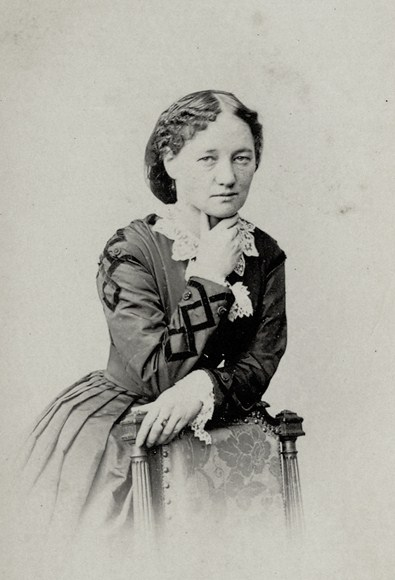
- Born: 21 April 1829; Munich, Bavaria, German Empire
- Died: 11 August 1889 (aged 60)
- Buried: Trinity Lavra of St. Sergius
- Noble family: Tyutchev
- Spouse: Ivan Aksakov
- Father: Fyodor Tyutchev
- Mother: Countess Emilia Eleanor Sophia Louise Christina Bothmer

Anna Feodorovna Tyutcheva (Russian: А́нна Фёдоровна Тю́тчева, 3 May 1829 – 23 August 1889) was a Russian courtier, slavophile and memoirist.

Born the eldest daughter of Fyodor Tyutchev and his wife Eleanor Feodorovna Peterson, born Countess Emilia Eleanor Sophie Louise Christina Bothmer, in Germany, she was educated at the Munich Royal Institute before moving to Russia at the age of eighteen. Anna lived with her family at their estate of Ovstug, Oryol province until the age of 23, when her father petitioned for her to be appointed as maid of honour due to the family's financial situation.

In 1853, Anna was appointed as maid of honour to then Tsesarevna and later Empress Maria Alexandrovna. Tyutcheva became a favourite of Maria Alexandrovna, due to her European education, patriotism, and independent thinking. Some at court didn't tolerate her straight-forward nature, Count Sergei Dmitrievich Sheremetev wrote:

“She played a role, spoke, criticized, directed, and most of all annoyed everyone and everyone. Little by little, she lost her importance as her rival A. N. Maltsova became stronger . The court became unbearable for her and she got married."

In 1866, she married poet and fellow slavophile, Ivan Aksakov. She kept diaries between 1853 and 1882, which are regarded to be a valuable historic source of the life of Russian aristocracy in the mid-19th century. Both she and her husband are buried in the Trinity Lavra of St. Sergius.
