= Therese Jansen Bartolozzi =

German-born British pianist

- Born: 1770; Aachen in Germany
- Died: 1843 (aged 72–73); London
- Occupation: Pianist

Therese Jansen Bartolozzi (ca. 1770 – 29 June 1843) was a pianist whose career flourished in London around the end of the 18th century. She was the dedicatee of piano works by a number of famous composers.

== Early years ==
Therese Jansen is believed to have been born in Aachen in the Holy Roman Empire some time around 1770. Her father was a successful dancing master, who moved to London with his family. The family business of teaching dance to well-off customers was quite successful and was continued for some time by Therese and her younger brother Louis Jansen (1774–1840). According to an anonymous biography of Jansen's daughter (see below), the business made over 2000 pounds per year.

Both Therese and Louis studied with the famous pianist Muzio Clementi. Therese particularly excelled, and by her young adulthood, she had become an outstanding performer. By 1791 she probably had a strong reputation, as Johann Peter Salomon gave her and her family free tickets to the first series of the famous concerts which Joseph Haydn gave in London under his auspices.

== Career ==
Not long after, works were being dedicated to her by composers: Clementi, Haydn, and J. L. Dussek (see below). She was listed by a contemporary encyclopedist as one of Clementi's three most distinguished pupils, along with John Field and Johann Baptist Cramer.

Little evidence survives to document her career as a performer. Salwey mentions a performance of a Haydn sonata before the Anacreontic Society prior to 1791 and two other performances in 1806. It is possible that Jansen's fame developed primarily from performances in private homes.

Therese Jansen was married on 16 May 1795 to Gaetano Bartolozzi (1757–1821), a son of the noted artist and engraver Francesco Bartolozzi. One of the witnesses at the ceremony was their friend Haydn. Gaetano Bartolozzi was primarily an art dealer who also branched out into the sale of other goods as well; his work often took him to Venice. Bartolozzi was successful in his business and had purchased an estate about fifty miles from Venice. Like Therese, he was musical and was a fine violinist and violist.

Following two miscarriages, Therese gave birth to a daughter Elizabetta Lucia, who grew up to be a famous actress and theatre manager, performing under her married name of Lucia Elizabeth Vestris, or Madame Vestris. Therese and Gaetano also had a second daughter Josephine.

In 1798, Bartolozzi closed up his art business, auctioning off his stock at Christie's, and the family left for Europe: first Paris, then Vienna, and finally Venice. While in Vienna, they probably renewed their acquaintance with Haydn; they were among the subscribers to the first edition of The Creation, which Haydn published himself in 1800. Arriving in Venice, the Bartolozzis found that their property had been looted by French forces during the recent invasion of the area.

Needing to start over financially, they returned to London, where Bartolozzi began giving lessons in drawing. He died in 1821. Therese Bartolozzi separated from her husband there. She supported herself and her two daughters by teaching piano.

Therese Jansen Bartolozzi died in London in 1843.

== Works dedicated to Therese Jansen ==
- Muzio Clementi: 3 piano sonatas Opus 33 (1794)
- J.L. Dussek:
  - 3 sonatas for violin and piano Op. 13 (1793)
  - Piano sonata Op. 43 (1800)
- Joseph Haydn:
  - 3 piano trios Hob. XV: 27–9
  - 3 piano sonatas, Hob. XVI: 50, Hob. XVI: 51 and Hob. XVI:52
- Louis Jansen: Piano sonata Op. 6 (1802)
