= Thomas Hardy (English painter) =

English painter (1757–1804)

- Born: 1757; Derbyshire, England, Kingdom of Great Britain
- Died: 14 September 1804 (aged 47); England, United Kingdom of Great Britain and Ireland
- Style: Portrait painter

Thomas Hardy (1757 – 14 September 1804) was a portrait painter born in Derbyshire, England.

== Biography ==
Not much is known about Hardy's background, life and career. He enrolled at the Royal Academy Schools at the end of 1778, where records show he had turned 21 in the previous June. He exhibited some 31 paintings at the Royal Academy from 1778 to 1798 — practically all portraits — and four portraits at the Society of Artists exhibition in 1790.

Thomas Hardy's sitters included musical figures active in London during the 1790s. Most of Hardy's portrait paintings were painted for the British music seller and publisher John Bland (c.1750 – c.1840). Bland appears to have commissioned oil portraits of several leading musicians of the day from Hardy, although the details surrounding this are uncertain, and published the resulting engravings based upon them.

=== Paintings ===
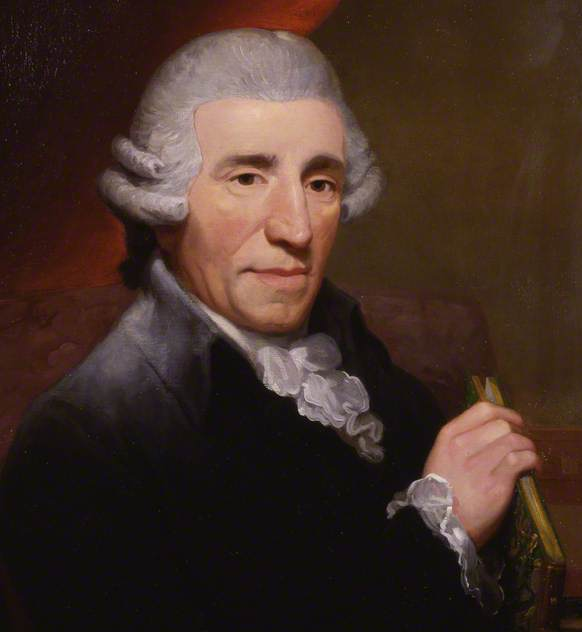
Joseph Haydn portrait by Hardy, 1792

Thomas Hardy is known for the famous portrait of the composer Joseph Haydn now hanging in the Royal College of Music. The subsequent engraving, also by Hardy and published by Bland, has been widely reproduced and copied since it first appeared in early 1792. He is also known for the noted portrait of the composer and pianist Muzio Clementi. The stippled portrait was published on 31 October 1794 by the London music publisher John Bland No. 45 Holborn which is now at the British Museum.

Thomas Hardy also painted the portraits of Johann Peter Salomon, Ignaz Pleyel, Wilhelm Cramer, Samuel Arnold, and William Shield (the last apparently commissioned one of the British music publisher John Bland's business successors, Francis Linley). Hardy exhibited four of these portraits at the Royal Academy: Joseph Haydn and Johann Peter Salomon in 1792, Wilhelm Cramer in 1794, and Samuel Arnold in 1796. Hardy's portrait of Wilhelm Cramer is at the National Portrait Gallery, London, and his portraits of Joseph Haydn, Johann Peter Salomon and William Shield are at the Royal College of Music.

=== Uncertainties ===
The date of Thomas Hardy's death had been uncertain until now, but the Gentleman's Magazine of October 1804 states that he died "after a long illness" on 14 September 1804. His life before attending the Royal Academy Schools was also a mystery. The diary of the topographical artist Joseph Farington (1747–1821), states that Hardy was born in Derbyshire and that he studied under Wright of Derby. Farington adds that he "died aged 47 in consequence of a cold caught at the Academy while painting Copies of the Portraits of the King & Queen for Lawrence", which is consistent with the Gentleman's Magazine notice.

== Political reformer of the same name ==
The painter Thomas Hardy has sometimes been confused with another Thomas Hardy: the shoemaker, radical, and founder of the London Corresponding Society who lived 1752–1832. Hardy the artist did paint the politician John Horne Tooke, who was associated with Hardy the radical, and the latter two were both put on trial for high treason in 1794.
