= Symphony No. 93 (Haydn) =

1791 composition by Joseph Haydn

- by Joseph Haydn
- Haydn in 1791
- Key: D major
- Catalogue: Hob. I:93
- Composed: 1791
- Duration: c. 20-25 minutes
- Movements: 4
- Scoring: Orchestra

Premiere
- Date: 17 February 1792
- Location: Hanover Square Rooms, London
- Conductor: Joseph Haydn

Joseph Haydn's Symphony No. 93 in D major, Hoboken I/93, is one of Haydn's twelve London symphonies (numbers 93–104). The symphony was completed in 1791 as one of the set of symphonies completed for his first trip to London. It was first performed at the Hanover Square Rooms in London on 17 February 1792.

Of the twelve London symphonies, No. 93 appears first in the Hoboken-Verzeichnis catalogue. However, it was likely the third to be composed of the set, after No. 96 in D major and No. 95 in C minor.

A typical performance lasts roughly 20-25 minutes.

== Music ==
The symphony is scored for two flutes, two oboes, two bassoons, two horns, two trumpets, timpani and strings.

The work is in standard four-movement form:

1. Adagio – Allegro assai, 3/4
2. Largo cantabile, 2/2 in G major
3. Menuetto. Allegro, 3/4
4. Finale: Presto ma non troppo, 2/4

=== I. Adagio – Allegro assai ===
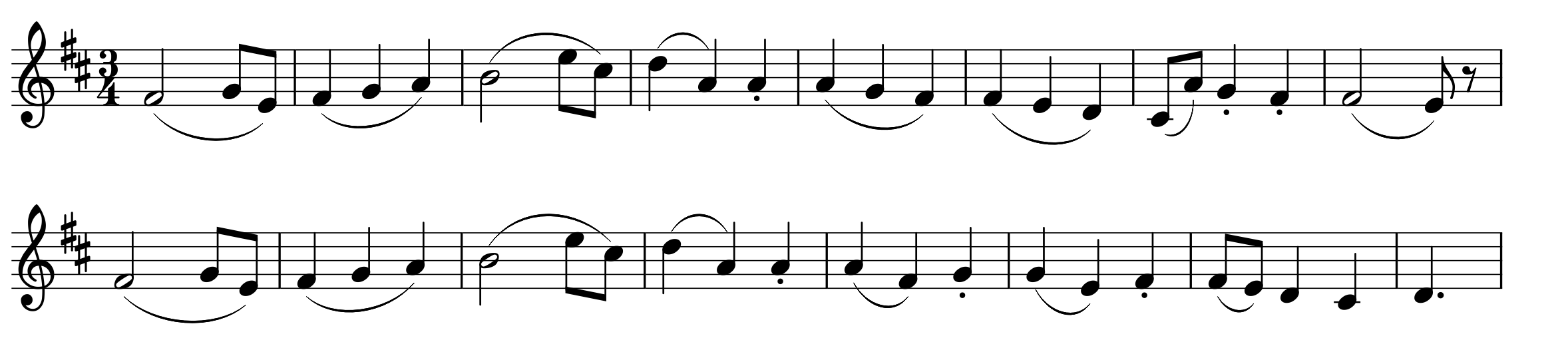
The principal theme of the first movement. The theme enters in the 21st measure of the movement, after an Adagio introduction.

The first movement is in sonata form: after an introduction follows an exposition that ends with a repeat sign, a development, a recapitulation and a coda.

The introduction is twenty measures long and marked "Adagio". It opens with the orchestra playing the tonic note, D, in unison, avoiding the establishment of the home key of D major with root-position harmony. The introduction then proceeds on an harmonic excursion, through the dominant (A major), a Neapolitan chord (E♭ major, built on G), a diminished seventh, the parallel minor (D minor), and the subdominant minor (G minor), before concluding with a dominant seventh chord.

After the dominant seventh chord, the main body of the movement, marked "Allegro", commences with the statement of the principal theme. The exposition then continues with a transitional passage before a secondary theme in the dominant, A major. The American musicologist A. Peter Brown compared the secondary theme to a Ländler.

The development involves significant re-working of a motif from the secondary theme. The motif is inverted, and passed through a series of remote keys. Unusually for a late Haydn work, the recapitulation involves few surprises. It reprises the principal and secondary themes in the tonic before a short coda.

=== II. Largo cantabile ===
Towards the end of the second movement, the music gradually becomes slower and softer until an unexpected fortissimo bassoon "fart" brings the music back for the movement's closing. This shows Haydn's sense of humor—similar to the 2nd movement of the Surprise Symphony. Antony Hodgson identifies George Szell as a conductor who was not afraid to overdo "the vulgarity of this joke". Hodgson argues that "if, in concert, none of the audience laughs, then the episode must have been underplayed."

=== III. Menuetto. Allegro ===
The minuet proper has a ländler character. The minuet's trio is highly original and juxtaposes timpani-punctated fanfare outbursts with quieter passages scored only for strings.

=== IV. Finale: Presto ma non troppo ===
Andreas Kluge in his liner notes for the recording by George Szell on Sony Classics, states that the oboe quotes from "Viva La Liberta", a section in the Act I Finale of Mozart’s Don Giovanni. This occurs at bar 292 but as the oboe simply plays a theme consisting of notes of a D major triad, and does not use the dotted rhythm employed by Mozart, it is not clear that this is a deliberate reference. Kluge also states that Haydn wrote in a letter to Maria Anna von Genzinger that he was not completely satisfied with the finale because he considered it weak compared to the first movement. He stated that he planned to revise it, but there is no evidence that any revision ever took place.
