= List of symphonies in B-flat major =

This is a list of symphonies in B♭ major written by notable composers.

Composer	Symphony
Carl Philipp Emanuel Bach	Symphony in B♭ major, Wq.182:2 / H658 (1773)
Johann Christian Bach	Symphony Op. 3 No. 4 \ WC 4; Symphony Op. 6 No. 4 \ WC 10; Symphony WC 17a; Symphony Op. 9 No. 1 \ WC 17b; Symphony WCInc1
Johann Christoph Friedrich Bach	Symphony in B♭ major, BR-JCFB C 6 / Wf I/2 (ca. 1768); Symphony in B♭ major, BR-JCFB C 28 / Wf I/20 (ca. 1792-94)
Ludwig van Beethoven	Symphony No. 4, Op. 60 (1806)
Wilhelm Berger	Symphony No. 1, Op. 71 (1896-7, premiered in 1898)
Luigi Boccherini	Symphony No. 5, Op. 12/5, G. 507 (1771); Symphony No. 12, Op. 35/6, G. 514 (1782)
Anton Bruckner	Symphony No. 5 (1876)
Fritz Brun	Symphony No. 2 (1911); Symphony No. 10 (1953)
George Whitefield Chadwick	Symphony No. 2, Op. 21 (1886)
Ernest Chausson	Symphony in B♭, Op. 20 (1890)
James Cohn	Symphony No. 5 for chamber orchestra (1959)
Franz Danzi	Symphony, P. 222
Antonín Dvořák	Symphony No. 2, Op. 4, B. 12 (1865)
Eduard Franck	Symphony (1858 - lost) Symphony No. 2, Op. 52 (1883)
Niels Gade	Symphony No. 4, Op. 20 (1850)
Florian Leopold Gassmann	Symphonies Hill 15, 25, 41, 62, 113. There is also a symphony in B♭ which has been attributed to both Haydn and Gassmann.
Friedrich Gernsheim	Symphony No. 4, Op. 62 (1895)
Cecil Armstrong Gibbs	Symphony No. 3 Westmoreland, Op. 104 (1944)
Alexander Glazunov	Symphony No. 5, Op. 55 (1896)
Mikhail Glinka	Symphony in B♭ major (sketched and left unfinished in 1824, completed by Petr Klimov)
Benjamin Godard	Symphony No. 2(5), Op.57 (1879)
Johannes Haarklou	Symphony No. 1 (1883)
Joseph Haydn	Symphony No. 35 (1767); Symphony No. 51 (composed by 1774); Symphony No. 66 (composed by 1779); Symphony No. 68 (composed by 1779); Symphony No. 71 (composed by 1780); Symphony No. 77 (1782?); Symphony No. 85, La Reine ("The Queen") (1785?); Symphony No. 98 (1792); Symphony No. 102 (1794); Hob. I/105, better known as the Sinfonia Concertante (1792); Hob. I/106, for which only one part has survived (1769?); Hob. I/107, often known not by a number but as Symphony A (composed by 1762); Hob. I/108, often known not by a number but as Symphony B (composed by 1765)
Michael Haydn	Symphony No. 11, MH 37, Perger 2 (1761); Symphony No. 14, MH 133, Perger 52 (1768-70); Symphony No. 27, Opus 1 No. 1, MH 358, Perger 18 (1784); Symphony No. 33, MH 425, Perger 22 (1786); Symphony No. 36, MH 475, Perger 28 (1788)
Heinrich von Herzogenberg	Symphony No. 2, Op. 70 (1890)
Alfred Hill	Symphony No. 1 The Maori (1896–1900); Symphony No. 6 Celtic (1956)
Paul Hindemith	Symphony in B♭ for Concert Band (1951)
Leopold Hofmann	Symphony (Badley Bb1) (by 1763)
Richard Hol	Symphony No. 3, Op. 101 (1867/84)
Vincent d'Indy	Symphony No. 2, Op. 57 (1902-3)
Charles Ives	Symphony No. 3 "The Camp Meeting" (1904-11)
George Alexander Macfarren	Symphony No. 6 (1836)
Felix Mendelssohn	Lobgesang, symphony-cantata (Symphony No. 2), Op. 52 (1840)
Wolfgang Amadeus Mozart	Symphony No. 2, K. 17 (spurious); Symphony No. 5, K. 22 (1765); Symphony No. 24, K. 182 (1773); Symphony No. 33, K. 319 (1779)
Wilhelm Peterson-Berger	Symphony No. 1, Baneret (1889–1903/1932–3)
Václav Pichl	Symphony Melpomene (Zakin 14) (1768/9)
Ignaz Pleyel	Symphony, Benton 125 (1782-4); Symphony, Benton 132 (published 1792); Symphony, Benton 135 (published 1787); Symphony, Benton 150 (published 1799)
Sergei Prokofiev	Symphony No. 5, Op. 100 (1944)
Joachim Raff	Symphony No. 7, Op. 201 "In den Alpen" (1875)
Emil von Reznicek	Symphony No. 2 (1904)
Jean Rivier	Symphony No. 4 for Strings (1941)
Antonio Rosetti	Symphony M.A49, Op.13 Book 1 (published by André in 1794)
Albert Roussel	Symphony No. 2, Op. 23 (1919–21)
Franz Schubert	Symphony No. 2, D. 125; Symphony No. 5, D. 485 (1816)
Robert Schumann	Symphony No. 1, Op. 38 "Spring" (1841)
Harold Shapero	Symphony for Classical Orchestra (1947)
Charles Villiers Stanford	Symphony No. 1 (by 1875)
Johan Svendsen	Symphony No. 2, Op. 15 (1874-6)
Karol Szymanowski	Symphony No. 2, Op. 19 (1909/10)
Sergei Taneyev	Symphony No. 2 (incomplete, 1875)
Johann Baptist Wanhal	Symphony, Bryan Bb1; Symphony, Bryan Bb2; Symphony, Bryan Bb3; Symphony, Bryan Bb4; Symphony, Bryan Bb5
Robert Volkmann	Symphony No. 2, Op. 53 (1864-5)
Samuel Wesley	Symphony (1802)
Alexander von Zemlinsky	Symphony No. 2 (1897)
Carl Friedrich Abel	Symphony/Overture in B♭ major, Op. 1 No. 1, D33/E1 (1759?); Symphony/Overture in B♭ major, Op. 4 No. 2, E8 (1762); Symphony in B♭ major, Op. 7 No. 2, E14 (1767); Symphony in B♭ major, Op. 10 No. 2, E20 (1773); Symphony/Overture in B♭ major, Op. 14 No. 4, E28; Sinfonia in B♭ major, Op. 17 No. 2, E32 (1783); Sinfonia in B♭ major, Op. 17 No. 5, E35 (1783); Symphony in B♭ major, Six Prussian Symphonies No. 2, E42; Symphony in B♭ major, Six Prussian Symphonies, No. 5, E45
