= Symphony No. 99 (Haydn) =

Seventh of the twelve London symphonies by Haydn

- by Joseph Haydn
- Haydn in 1791
- Key: E-flat major
- Catalogue: Hob. I:99
- Composed: Vienna, 1793
- Duration: c. 25 minutes
- Movements: 4
- Scoring: Orchestra

Premiere
- Date: 10 February 1794
- Location: Hanover Square Rooms, London
- Conductor: Joseph Haydn

The Symphony No. 99 in E♭ major (Hoboken I/99) is the seventh of the twelve London symphonies (Hoboken numbers 93–104) written by Joseph Haydn. The symphony was written in 1793 in Vienna in anticipation for his second trip to London.

The work was premiered on 10 February 1794 at the Hanover Square Rooms in London, with Haydn directing the orchestra seated at a fortepiano. This concert series featuring Haydn's compositions was organized by his colleague and friend Johann Peter Salomon.

A typical performance lasts around 25 minutes.

== Music ==
The work is scored for two flutes, two oboes, two clarinets, two bassoons, two horns, two trumpets, timpani and strings. It is the first of Haydn's symphonies to be scored for clarinets, which suggests the influence of his late friend Mozart.

The symphony is in four movements:

1. Adagio, 2/2 — Vivace assai, 4/4
2. Adagio, 3/4
3. Menuetto e Trio. Allegretto, 3/4
4. Finale: Vivace, 2/4

I. Adagio – Vivace assai
1st part

2nd part
Both excerpts recorded in 1935 by the London Philharmonic Orchestra

=== I. Adagio – Vivace assai ===
Opening theme of the Vivace assai

The introduction to the first movement contains much tonal complexity in its 14 measures. After the typical tonic-to-dominant opening, he prepares two successive minor-mode keys (E minor and C minor) before the introduction comes to a halt with a fermata on a G major chord (the dominant of C minor). The winds then play a single soft chord (dominant seventh) of E♭ which resolves immediately to the opening theme of the Vivace assai.

The movement proceeds in sonata form with considerable breadth. After exploring the opening theme, there is an extended transitional section. When the dominant key of B♭ major is reached we hear not a new theme but the opening theme again transposed implying this may be a monothematic exposition. A true second theme played by the violins and a solo clarinet finally does appear 33 measures later before the exposition rapidly comes to close. The development starts with two false starts of the opening theme in G major before the second theme is developed in a variety of keys. The recapitulation is greatly condensed with much of the transitional movement music removed and second theme appearing much sooner. The movement coda features the first theme over a tonic pedal played by first bassoon and second horn.

=== II. Adagio ===
The Adagio is similar to the slow movement of the 98th symphony in that features a hymn-like theme in triple meter. It is a sonata-form movement in G major featuring rich orchestration. The opening theme features the winds echoing the strings. The transitional music that follows is written for winds only. The second theme in D major features doubled sonority. The development features two large climaxes where the trumpets and timpani enter. In the recapitulation, the transitional music previously heard in the winds is re-orchestrated for only strings. The second theme is restated twice and a smaller climax brings the movement to a close.

=== III. Menuetto e Trio. Allegretto ===
The minuet is in the key of E♭ major with a trio in the distant key of C major.

=== IV. Finale: Vivace ===
The finale is an example of the sonata rondo form that Haydn frequently used in his later symphonic works.
