= London symphonies =

Group of symphonies by Joseph Haydn

The London symphonies, sometimes called the Salomon symphonies after Johann Peter Salomon who introduced London to Joseph Haydn, were composed by Joseph Haydn between 1791 and 1795. They can be categorised into two groups: Symphonies Nos. 93–98, which were composed during Haydn's first visit to London, and Symphonies Nos. 99–104, composed in Vienna and London for Haydn's second visit.

== Haydn's first journey to London ==
Haydn was called on by Johann Peter Salomon, and was told he would be going to London. Haydn himself had thought of going to London before, saying that symphonies nos. 76–78 were composed for the English gentlemen, and that he intended to bring them over himself and produce them. London was quite cosmopolitan, and had an active music scene, which was enriched by a stream of artists from abroad. Haydn plunged into a chaotic professional life, giving fortepiano lessons, arranging concerts complete with royal invitations, and choral performances in Westminster Abbey. It was this immersion into the London musical culture that began to inspire his composing as well.

The first six London symphonies were written between 1791 and 1792, and included symphony nos. 93–98. They were also premiered in those years, although nos. 95 and 96 were the only ones performed in 1791, despite 93 and 94 being completed prior. The reception was overall positive, and the concerts garnered profits nearly double what he had been guaranteed. The symphonies were seen as grand productions, surpassing any of Haydn's previous performances. As a result of this success, Salomon and Haydn agreed that, following the end of the 1791 season, Haydn would stay for another year.

== Haydn's second journey to London ==
In between the production of Symphonies 98 and 99, Haydn travelled and composed, giving concerts of his existing works once again, and the existing London symphonies began to be performed by others. In 1793, he would complete No. 99, and begin working on Nos. 100 and 101, all prior to his return to London. In January of 1794, Haydn made his way back to London, to premiere symphonies 99–101 in February and March of that year. As he continued to premiere each of his works, going up to Symphony No. 104, Haydn continued to experience success and praise. Salomon would depart from Haydn's travels, claiming difficulty in finding performers from abroad, but Haydn's success continued despite Salomon's departure.

== Audience reception and feedback ==
While Haydn experienced a level of isolation during his time at Esterházy court, allowing him to develop his originality, he would experience feedback from the community and audience in England. As one can imagine, the preferences of English listeners differed from some of Haydn's own preferences. Thus, there was a reciprocal relationship that was developed as Haydn was shaped by the audience, and the music shaped them in return.

While at the Esterházy court, Haydn found himself composing and curating performances for nobility, which was a stark contrast to the London audience, which consisted of middle to upper-middle class. The concerts became more open to a broader public, with listeners who expected more out of the performances than just entertainment. Haydn was not unaware of what critics said about his works, as he collected writings from them and sought insight into what was admired about his works, in addition to what pleased or displeased his audiences.

As noted below, Symphony No. 95 lacked a slow introduction, in contradiction with the other eleven symphonies in the collection. This was, however, not received well by audiences in London, and Haydn's compositions seem to have steered clear of such approaches in future works. After a slight amount of backpedalling, Haydn regained audience approval, which allowed him to incorporate more freedom into his works. Haydn's London symphonies do not only reflect his artistic maturity in his late career, they reflect an active awareness and engagement with the expectations of his audience.

Every London symphony, apart from No. 95, has a slow introduction to the first movement.

- Symphony No. 93 in D major (1791)
- Symphony No. 94 in G major, The Surprise (1791)
- Symphony No. 95 in C minor (1791)
- Symphony No. 96 in D major, The Miracle (1791)
- Symphony No. 97 in C major (1792)
- Symphony No. 98 in B♭ major (1792)
- Symphony No. 99 in E♭ major (1793)
- Symphony No. 100 in G major, Military (1793–1794)
- Symphony No. 101 in D major, The Clock (1793–1794)
- Symphony No. 102 in B♭ major (1794)
- Symphony No. 103 in E♭ major, Drumroll (1795)
- Symphony No. 104 in D major, London (1795)

== See also ==
- List of symphonies by Joseph Haydn
