= Symphony No. 101 (Haydn) =

Ninth of the twelve London symphonies by Haydn

- Clock
- by Joseph Haydn
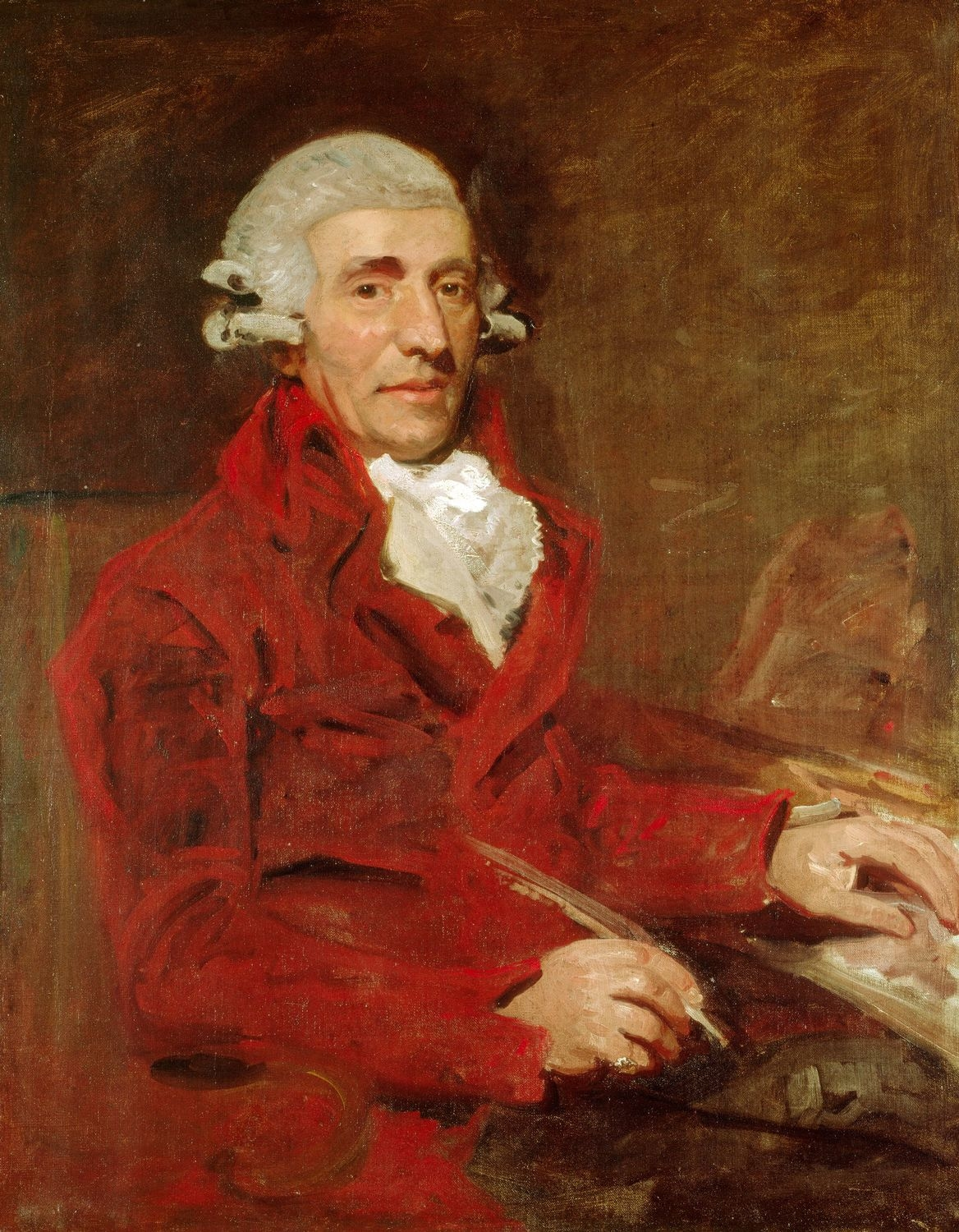
- Haydn in around 1792
- Key: D major
- Catalogue: Hob. I:101
- Composed: 1793/94
- Duration: c. 30 minutes
- Movements: 4
- Scoring: Orchestra

Premiere
- Date: 3 March 1794
- Location: Hanover Square Rooms, London
- Conductor: Joseph Haydn

The Symphony No. 101 in D major, Hob. I:101 is the ninth of the twelve London symphonies written by Joseph Haydn. It is popularly known as the Clock Symphony because of the "ticking" rhythm throughout the second movement.

== Composition, premiere, and reception ==
Haydn completed the symphony in 1793 or 1794. He wrote it for the second of his two visits to London. Having heard one of his symphonies played in London with an orchestra of 300-strong, his Clock Symphony has that large scale grandeur written in it. On 3 March 1794, the work was premiered with an orchestra of 60 personally gathered by Haydn's colleague and friend Johann Peter Salomon, who also acted as concertmaster, in the Hanover Square Rooms, as part of a concert series featuring Haydn's work organized by Salomon; a second performance took place a week later.

As was generally true for the London symphonies, the response of the audience was very enthusiastic. The Oracle reported that "the connoisseurs admit [it] to be his best work." Additionally, the Morning Chronicle reported:

As usual the most delicious part of the entertainment was a new grand Overture [that is, symphony] by HAYDN; the inexhaustible, the wonderful, the sublime HAYDN! The first two movements were encored; and the character that pervaded the whole composition was heartfelt joy. Every new Overture he writes, we fear, till it is heard, he can only repeat himself; and we are every time mistaken.

The work has always been popular and continues to appear frequently on concert programs and in recordings. An average performance lasts about 27 minutes.

== Music ==
It is scored for two flutes, two oboes, two clarinets, two bassoons, two horns, two trumpets, timpani and strings.

The work is in standard four-movement form:

1. Adagio – Presto, 3/4 in D minor then 6/8 in D major
2. Andante, 2/4 (G major)
3. Menuetto: Allegretto, 3/4
4. Finale: Vivace, 2/2

=== I. Adagio – Presto ===
The opening movement starts with a minor introduction consisting of 23 measures. A rising scale motif opens the Adagio, similar to the opening of the main theme of the Presto, and connects the Adagio to the main movement.

The main theme of the Presto is meant to catch attention — the rising scale motif begins and ends on the dominant, and two broken chords follow — the tonic and the second degree minor, and ends on the tonic. This phrase also consists of 10 bars, broken into two parts of an odd 1+4 bar distribution. After the main theme, this phrase returns and starts the modulation by the usage of the A diminished chord, leading to E minor, which finally leads to E major, the dominant of A major. The secondary theme has a similar rhythmic pattern, also beginning with scales in the violins but descending this time, but it has more subtlety. A triumphant codetta concludes the exposition.

The development starts with the secondary theme motif appearing in various instruments in counterpoint and shifts into the main theme's different motifs, also presented contrapuntally. The development turns toward conclusion with the secondary theme once more, and ends with a long falling scale. The recapitulation is straightforward, and the triumphant coda finishes this grand movement. The Morning Chronicle said, "Nothing can be more original than the subject of the first movement, and having found a happy subject, no man knows like Haydn how to produce incessant variety, without once departing from it."

=== II. Andante ===
II. Andante
Performed by the Geneva Camerata

The second movement, from which the symphony gets its name, begins with plucked strings and bassoons. Towards the middle of the movement, there is a dark, fierce passage in G minor, followed by Haydnesque humor and finally the clock theme once again. Michael Steinberg said, "Haydn has a gratifying number of different clocks in his shop, offering 'tick-tock' in a happy variety of colors."

This movement is featured In Baby Einstein's Numbers Nursery.

=== III. Menuetto. Allegretto ===
In 1793, Haydn had given his employer Prince Esterházy an elaborate musical clock, for which he wrote 12 short pieces, one of them being the basis for the third movement. This movement, a minuet, is one of Haydn's longest. The trio evokes a bungling village band, with more Haydnesque humor, similar to that Beethoven would use in the trio of his Pastoral Symphony. Many scholars, publishers, and musicians, not knowing Haydn's humor, would often "correct" the trio.

=== IV. Finale. Vivace ===
The finale of the work is a monothematic rondo-sonata. This means that the main theme and the secondary theme are similar, or in this case, almost identical, and the main theme is played every time a theme ends. Haydn vastly changes the main theme with each occurrence — something that is not done in rondo works. Even the bridges in between themes are similar to the main theme. Haydn also builds a fugue into the last movement.

== Sources ==
- Beggerow, Alan (2012). "Haydn—Symphony No. 101 'Clock'". Musical Musings.
- Grünewald, Helge; Anderson, Phyllis (trans.) (2015). "Free from External Constraints: Two Symphonies by Joseph Haydn and a Piano Concert by Wolfgang Amadeus Mozart". Berliner Philharmonie.
- Huscher, Phillip (n.d.). "Symphony No. 101 in D Major (The Clock)" (PDF). Chicago Symphony Orchestra.
- Robbins Landon, H. C. (1976). Haydn: Chronicle and Works, Volume IV. Bloomington and London: Indiana University Press.
- Steinberg, Michael (1995). The Symphony: A Listener's Guide. Oxford University Press. ISBN 978-0-19-506177-2.
- Steinberg, Michael (1998). "Notes on the Program: Symphony No. 101 in D Major, Clock: Franz Joseph Haydn". Leon Levy Digital Archives. New York Philharmonic.
