= 1791 in music =

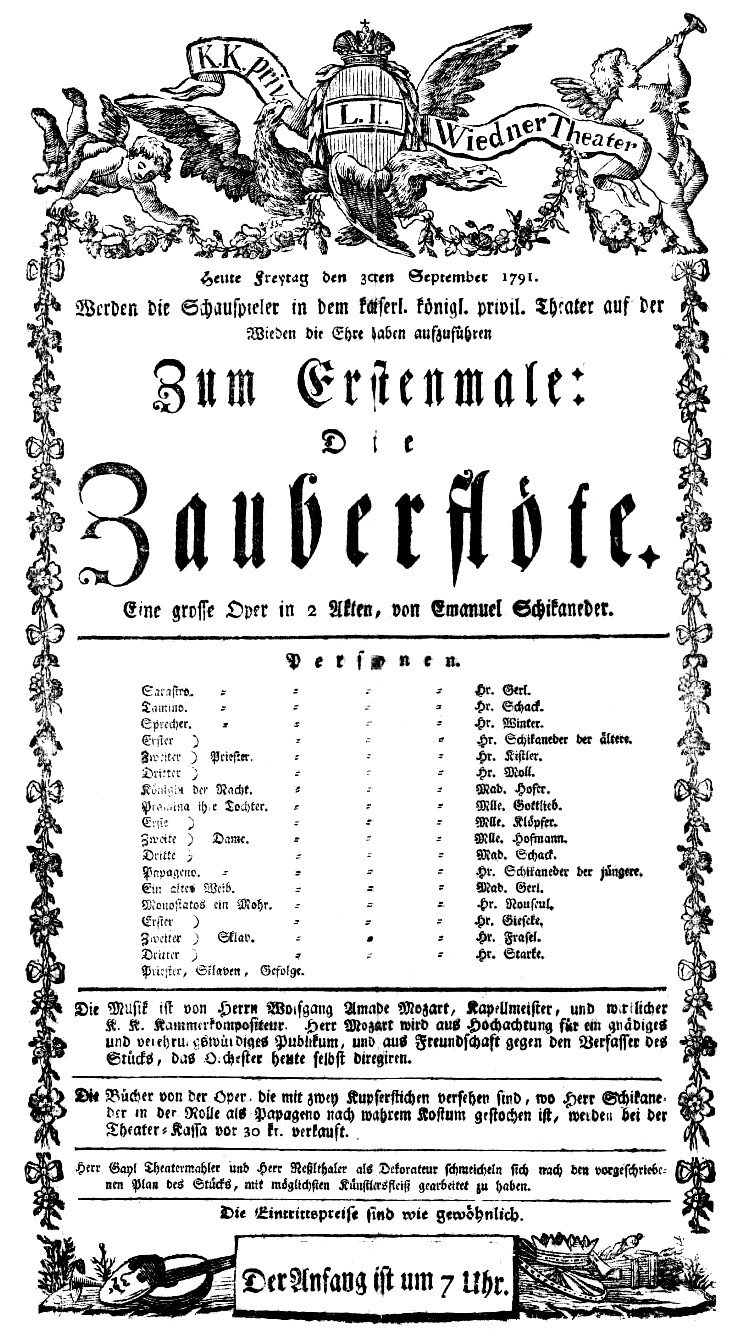
The Magic Flute – play bill of the first performance on September 30, 1791 at Schikaneder's Theater auf der Wieden, Vienna.

The year 1791 in music involved some significant events.

== Events ==
- January 1 – Austrian composer Joseph Haydn arrives in England at the invitation of London resident impresario Johann Peter Salomon; here his concerts are huge successes. On March 11, the first of his London symphonies, Symphony No. 96, is premièred at the Hanover Square Rooms. On July 8 he is awarded an honorary doctorate of music at the University of Oxford and probably conducts his Symphony No. 92 in the Sheldonian Theatre as part of the ceremonials.
- Mid-July – An emissary of Count Franz von Walsegg commissions a Requiem for the late Countess Anna from Wolfgang Amadeus Mozart.
- August 24 – Official opening of the Teatro Riccardi opera house in Bergamo, Lombardy, with a production of Pietro Metastasio's Didone abbandonata set to music by multiple composers including Ferdinando Bertoni, Giacomo Rampini, Johann Gottlieb Naumann, Giuseppe Gazzaniga and Giovanni Paisiello.
- September 6 – Première of Wolfgang Amadeus Mozart's opera seria La clemenza di Tito ("The Clemency of Titus", K. 621, with libretto adapted by Caterino Mazzolà after Metastasio) at the Estates Theatre in Prague with Mozart conducting and the castrato Domenico Bedini playing Sesto. It has been written in around 18 days (after most of The Magic Flute has been completed) to a commission by Domenico Guardasoni to mark the coronation of Leopold II as King of Bohemia, after Salieri had declined the commission.
- September 30 – Première of Wolfgang Amadeus Mozart's Singspiel opera The Magic Flute (Die Zauberflöte, K. 620) at the Freihaus-Theater auf der Wieden in suburban Vienna with Mozart conducting, probably from the keyboard, the librettist (and theatre proprietor) Emanuel Schikaneder playing Papageno and Mozart's sister-in-law Josepha Hofer playing the Queen of the Night.
- December 5 (01:00) – Death of Wolfgang Amadeus Mozart, age 35, at his home in Vienna of fever; on a mild and misty December 7, following a funeral service in St. Stephen's Cathedral, he is buried in a common grave (as customary at this time) in St. Marx Cemetery in the presence of Salieri, Süssmayr, van Swieten (his patron) and two other musicians.

== Classical music ==
- Muzio Clementi
  - Piano Sonata, Op. 26
  - 3 Piano Trios, Op. 27
- Franz Anton Hoffmeister – 3 String Quartets, Op. 14
- Joseph Haydn
  - Symphony No. 93 in D major
  - Symphony No. 94 in G major, The Surprise
  - Symphony No. 95 in C minor
  - Symphony No. 96 in D major, The Miracle
  - Baryton Trio in D major, Hob.XI:74
- Leopold Kozeluch – String Quartets, Op. 33
- Wolfgang Amadeus Mozart
  - Piano Concerto No. 27 in B♭ major (K. 595)
  - Sehnsucht nach dem Frühling, K.596
  - Im Frühlingsanfang, K.597
  - Das Kinderspiel, K.598
  - Fantasia in F minor, K.608
  - Per questa bella mano, K.612
  - 8 Variations on "Ein Weib ist das herrlichste Ding", K.613
  - Adagio and Rondo for glass harmonica, flute, oboe, viola and cello (K^{6}. 617) and Adagio in C for Glass Harmonica (K^{6}. 617a)
  - Ave verum corpus, motet in D major (K. 618)
  - Clarinet Concerto in A major (K. 622)
  - Horn Concerto No. 1 in D major (K. 412)
  - Menuets (K. 599, 601 & 604)
  - String Quintet No. 6 in E♭ major (K. 614)
  - Freimaurerkantate: "Laut verkünde unsre Freude" ("Kleine Freimaurer-Kantate, Little Masonic Cantata"; K. 623)
  - Requiem in D minor (K. 626; unfinished)
- Johann Christoph Oley – Herr Gott, dich loben alle wir
- Maria Hester Park – Keyboard Concerto in E-flat Major, Op. 6
- Ignaz Pleyel
  - Symphonie concertante in B-flat major, B.112
  - Symphony in F major, B.140A
  - Symphony in D minor, B.147
  - 3 Keyboard Trios, B.440–442
- Franz Xaver Süssmayr – Concerto Movement in D major for basset horn
- Paul Wranitzky – Symphonies, Op. 16

== Opera ==
- Marcello Bernardini – L'amore per incanto
- Luigi Cherubini – Lodoïska
- André Ernest Modeste Grétry – Guillaume Tell
- Joseph Haydn – L'Anima del Filosofo, Hob.XXVIII:13
- Étienne Méhul – Alonzo et Cora
- Wolfgang Amadeus Mozart
  - La clemenza di Tito
  - The Magic Flute
- William Shield – The Woodman

== Methods and theory writings ==
- William Jackson – Observations on the Present State of Music in London
- Johann George Tromlitz – Ausführlicher und gründlicher Unterricht die Flöte zu spielen
- Daniel Gottlob Turk – Anweisung zum Generalbaßspielen

== Births ==
- January 6 – José Melchor Gomis, Spanish composer (died 1836)
- January 20 – Tommaso Grossi, lyricist and poet (died 1853)
- January 28 – Ferdinand Hérold, French operatic composer (d. 1833)
- February 10 – Henry Hart Milman, librettist and historian (died 1868)
- February 20
  - Carl Czerny, Austrian composer (d. 1857)
  - Émile Deschamps, librettist and poet (died 1871)
- March 9 – Nicolas Levasseur, French operatic bass (d. 1871)
- May 11 – Jan Václav Voříšek, Bohemian pianist, organist and composer (d. 1825)
- May 29 – Pietro Romani, Italian singing teacher (d. 1877)
- June 9 – John Howard Payne, librettist and actor (died 1852)
- June 10 – Václav Hanka, librettist and archivist (died 1861)
- July 26
  - Francisco José Debali, Hungarian-born composer (d. 1859)
  - Franz Xaver Wolfgang Mozart, Austrian composer and pianist (d. 1844)
- August 25 – Christian Karl Josias Bunsen, composer and diplomat (died 1860)
- September 5 – Giacomo Meyerbeer, born Jacob Liebmann Beer, German-born operatic composer (d. 1864)
- October 7 – Friedrich Wilhelm Grund, German composer (d. 1874)
- October 31 – Ferdinand Huber, Swiss composer (d. 1863)
- December 24 – Eugène Scribe, librettist and dramatist (died 1861)

== Deaths ==
- January 13 – Antoine Huberty, composer and musician (born c. 1722)
- February 2 – Frantisek Kotzwara, Czech-born double bassist and composer (b. 1730) (erotic asphyxiation)
- February 5 – John Beard, English operatic tenor and actor-manager (b. c. 1716/17)
- March 22 – Carlo Besozzi, Italian oboist and composer (b. 1738)
- April 4 – Elisabeth Lillström, Swedish operatic soprano (b. 1717)
- May 9 – Francis Hopkinson, composer and judge (born 1737)
- May 14 – Francesca Lebrun, German singer and composer (b. 1756)
- August 12 – Isabella Young, English operatic mezzo-soprano and organist
- August 25 – Pietro Domenico Paradisi, Italian harpsichordist and composer (b. 1707)
- October 25 – Giovanni Battista Ferrandini, Italian composer (b. 1710)
- December 5 – Wolfgang Amadeus Mozart, Austrian composer (b. 1756)
- December? – Johann August Just, German composer (born c. 1750)
- date unknown – Giuseppe Demachi, composer and violinist (born 1732)
