= Fritz Reiner =

American conductor (1888–1963)

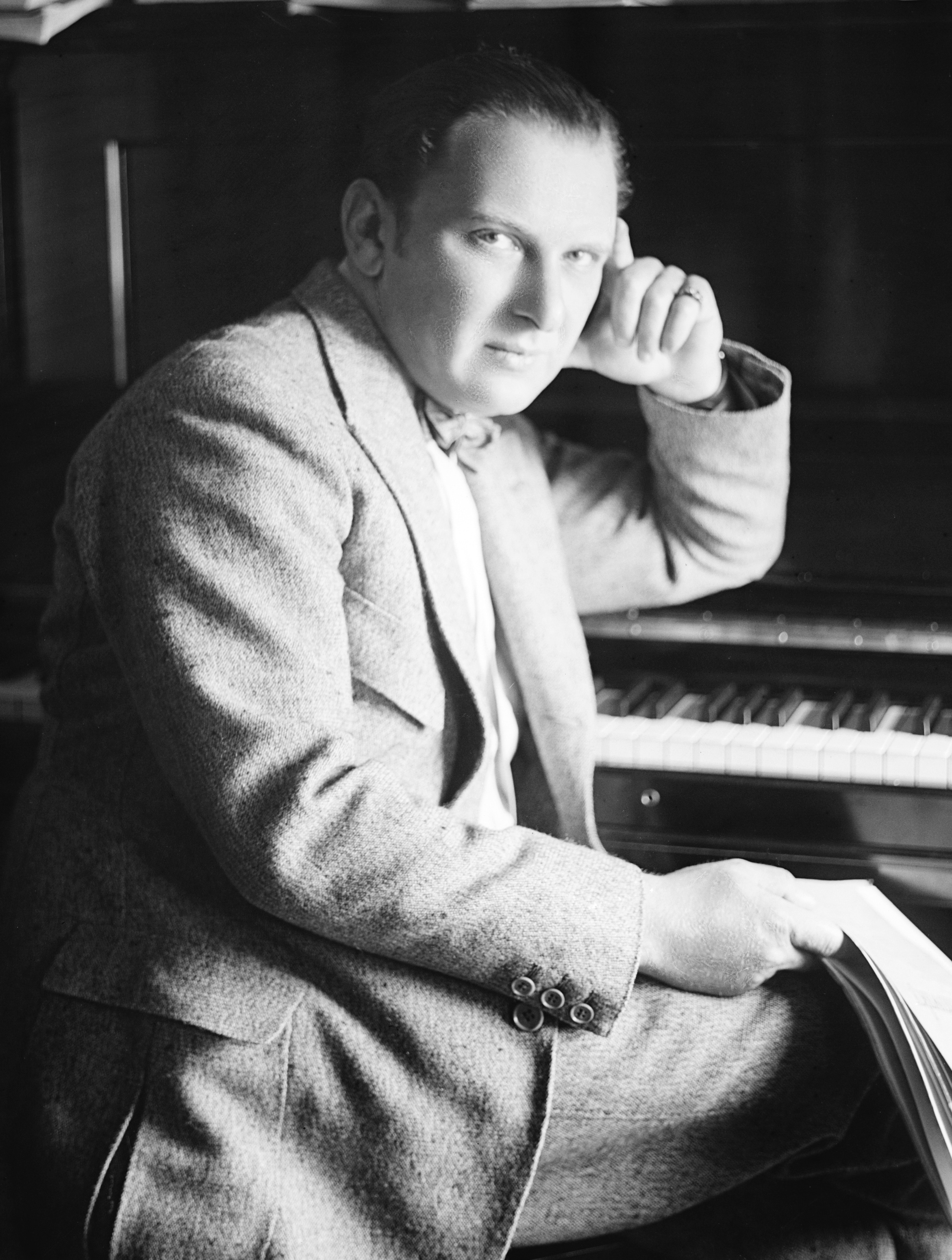
Fritz Reiner

Frederick Martin Reiner (Hungarian: Reiner Frigyes; December 19, 1888 – November 15, 1963) was an American conductor of opera and symphonic music in the twentieth century. Hungarian born and trained, he emigrated to the United States in 1922, where he rose to prominence as a conductor with several orchestras. He reached the pinnacle of his career while music director of the Chicago Symphony Orchestra in the 1950s and early 1960s.

== Life and career ==
Reiner was born in Budapest, Austria-Hungary into a secular Jewish family that resided in the Pest area of the city. After preliminary studies in law at his father's urging, Reiner instead decided to pursue the study of piano, piano pedagogy, and composition at the Franz Liszt Academy. Between 1903 and 1905 he studied the piano with István Thomán. From 1905 to 1908 he was a member of the composition class of Hans Koessler. From 1907 until 1909 he studied piano pedagogy with Kálmán Chován. During his last two years there, his piano teacher was the young Béla Bartók.

After early engagements at opera houses in Budapest and Dresden (June 1914 to November 1921), where he worked closely with Richard Strauss, he moved to the United States in 1922 to take the post of principal conductor of the Cincinnati Symphony Orchestra, where he remained until 1931. During that period, in 1928, he and his wife became naturalized citizens. In 1931 he accepted the role of conductor of both the Philadelphia Grand Opera and head of the orchestral department at the Curtis Institute in Philadelphia. Some of his pupils included Leonard Bernstein, Lukas Foss, Max Goberman, Boris Goldovsky, Walter Hendl, Sylvan Levin, Henry Mazer, Howard Mitchell, Vincent Persichetti, Ezra Rachlin, Nino Rota, Felix Slatkin, Ethel Stark, and Hugo Weisgall. Reiner dismissed composer Samuel Barber from his conducting class as he lacked that talent. Reiner resigned from Curtis in 1941.

He conducted the Pittsburgh Symphony Orchestra from 1938 to 1948 and made a few recordings with them for Columbia Records. He then spent several years at the Metropolitan Opera, where he conducted a historic production of Richard Strauss's Salome in 1949, with the Bulgarian soprano Ljuba Welitsch in the title role, and the American premiere of Stravinsky's The Rake's Progress in 1951.

He also conducted and made a recording of the 1952 Metropolitan Opera production of Bizet's Carmen, starring Risë Stevens. The production was telecast on closed-circuit television that year.

In 1947, Reiner appeared on camera in the film Carnegie Hall, in which he conducted the New York Philharmonic as they accompanied violinist Jascha Heifetz in an abbreviated version of the first movement of Tchaikovsky's Violin Concerto. Ten years later, Heifetz and Reiner recorded the full Tchaikovsky concerto in stereo for RCA Victor in Chicago.

Reiner's music-making had been largely American-focused since his arrival in Cincinnati. After the Second World War he began increasing his European activity. He became music director of the Chicago Symphony Orchestra in 1953.

He appeared with members of the Chicago Symphony in a series of telecasts on Chicago's WGN-TV in 1953–54, and a later series of nationally syndicated programs called Music From Chicago. Some of these performances have been issued on DVD.

He made recordings in Chicago's Orchestra Hall for RCA Victor from 1954 to 1963. The first of these — of Richard Strauss's Ein Heldenleben — occurred on March 6, 1954, and was among RCA's first to use stereophonic sound. His last concerts in Chicago took place in the spring of 1963.

One of his last recordings, released in a special Reader's Digest boxed set, was a performance of Brahms' Symphony No. 4, recorded with the Royal Philharmonic Orchestra in October 1962 in London's Kingsway Hall. This recording was later reissued on LP by Quintessence and on CD by Chesky.

On September 13 and 16, 1963, Reiner conducted a group of New York musicians in Haydn's Symphony No. 101 in D major; this was followed by September 18 and 20, 1963, sessions devoted to Haydn's Symphony No. 95 in C minor.

At the time of his death (in November 1963) he was preparing the Met's new production of Wagner's Götterdämmerung.

=== Personal life ===
Reiner was married three times (one of them to a daughter of Etelka Gerster) and had three daughters. His health deteriorated after a heart attack in October 1960. On November 11, 1963, while preparing for performances of Götterdämmerung at the Metropolitan Opera, Reiner became afflicted by bronchitis, which developed into pneumonia. He died in Mount Sinai Hospital in New York City on November 15, 1963, at the age of 74.

== Repertoire and style ==
Reiner and his compatriot Joseph Szigeti convinced Serge Koussevitzky to commission the Concerto for Orchestra from Bartók.

Reiner's conducting technique was noted for its precision and economy, in the manner of Arthur Nikisch and Arturo Toscanini.

Igor Stravinsky called the Chicago Symphony under Reiner "the most precise and flexible orchestra in the world"; it was more often than not achieved with tactics that bordered on the personally abusive, as Kenneth Morgan documents in 2005 biography of the conductor. Chicago musicians have spoken of Reiner's autocratic methods; trumpeter Adolph Herseth told National Public Radio that Reiner often tested him and other musicians.

== Sources ==
- Hart, Philip (1994). Fritz Reiner: A Biography. Evanston, Illinois: Northwestern University Press. ISBN 0-8101-1125-X.
- Morgan, Kenneth (2005). Fritz Reiner: Maestro & Martinet. Urbana, Illinois: University of Illinois Press. ISBN 0-252-02935-6.
