= Symphony No. 96 (Haydn) =

Symphony by Joseph Haydn

- Miracle
- by Joseph Haydn
- Haydn in 1791
- Key: D major
- Catalogue: Hob. I:96
- Composed: 1791
- Duration: 20 minutes
- Movements: 4
- Scoring: Orchestra

Premiere
- Date: 11 March 1791
- Location: Hanover Square Rooms, London
- Conductor: Joseph Haydn

The Symphony No. 96 in D major, Hob. I:96, was completed by Joseph Haydn in 1791 as part of the set of symphonies composed on his first trip to London. It was first performed at the Hanover Square Rooms in London on 11 March 1791. Although it is the fourth of the twelve London symphonies (numbers 93–104) by number, it was actually the first one written and performed. It is popularly known as the Miracle Symphony.

The autograph manuscript of the symphony is preserved in the British Library.

A typical performance lasts around 20 minutes.

== Nickname ==
The nickname "Miracle" is not Haydn's own. Rather, it originated from the story that, during the symphony's premiere, a chandelier fell from the ceiling of the concert hall in which it was performed. The audience managed to dodge the chandelier successfully as they had all crowded to the front for the post-performance applause, resulting in no casualties. More careful and recent research suggests that this event actually took place during the 1795 premiere of his Symphony No. 102.

== Music ==
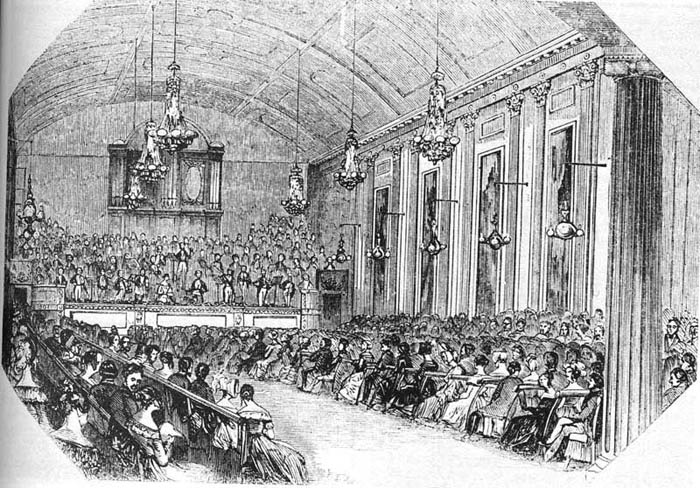
Engraving from The Illustrated London News, showing a concert in Hanover Square Rooms on Hanover Square. The chandeliers in the hall can clearly be seen.

The symphony is scored for two flutes, two oboes, two bassoons, two horns, two trumpets, timpani and strings.

It is in standard four-movement form:

1. Adagio – Allegro, 3/4
2. Andante, 6/8 in G major
3. Menuetto: Allegretto, 3/4
4. Finale: Vivace, 2/4

=== I. Adagio – Allegro ===
The first movement is in sonata form. Following a slow introduction, the first theme of the exposition is actually two overlapping themes, a short–short–short–long repeated-note theme in the first violins over a falling motif in the middle strings and bassoons. Following a brief transitional section, the first theme returns giving the opening section a ternary structure. The first theme group closes with fanfares featuring repeated notes. What follows is a more extended transition featuring three repeated eighth-notes as in the opening of the Allegro. There is no true second theme group making this a three-key exposition. The expositional coda also features motifs containing three eighth notes.

The development can be divided into three sections. The first section develops the exposition's first theme and the second develops themes from the exposition's coda. Both of these sections touch on the relative minor, B minor. Following a two-measure grand pause, the third section opens with a false recapitulation of the exposition in the wrong key of G major which quickly collapses into more development of the first theme. When the recapitulation arrives, it proceeds quickly. Following another transition, the fanfares from the first theme group return building up to an unexpected stormy climax in D minor leaving just seven measures of D major to bring the movement to a close.

=== II. Andante ===
The slow movement in G major is in ternary form (A–B–A) featuring a lightly scored, lilting theme with three upbeats. The central "B" section of the movement is for full tutti in G minor and is highly contrapuntal. The second "A" section finishes suspended on a cadential six-four chord. The following coda is indeed an orchestral cadenza featuring solos from the two principal violinists (including Salomon) and solos from the principal winds as well.

=== III. Menuetto: Allegretto ===
The trio of the minuet features an extended oboe solo.

=== IV. Finale: Vivace ===
The finale is a five-part rondo form (A–B–A–C–A), although it does include some elements of sonata form, implying that it could be a hybrid of both forms. The principal A section is primarily for the strings but are joined by the woodwinds in other areas. The B section revolves around D minor, while the C section features a short modulation to A major, thus showing a similarity to sonata form as mentioned above. Rhythmic patterns from both sections are referenced in the movement's coda.

== See also ==
- List of symphonies with names
