= Symphony in B =

Symphony in B can refer to:

- List of symphonies in B minor
- List of symphonies in B flat major

== See also ==
- List of symphonies by key
