= Symphony No. 98 (Haydn) =

Sixth of the twelve London symphonies by Haydn

- by Joseph Haydn
- Haydn in 1791
- Key: B♭ major
- Catalogue: Hob. I:98
- Composed: 1792
- Duration: c. 30 minutes
- Movements: 4
- Scoring: Orchestra

Premiere
- Date: 2 March 1792
- Location: Hanover Square Rooms, London
- Conductor: Joseph Haydn

The Symphony No. 98 in B♭ major, Hoboken I/98, is the sixth of the twelve London symphonies (numbers 93–104) composed by Joseph Haydn. It was completed in 1792 as part of the set of symphonies composed on his first trip to London. It was first performed at the Hanover Square Rooms in London on 2 March 1792. Some musicologists and historians interpret this symphony as Haydn’s tribute to his friend Mozart who had died on 5 December 1791.

== History ==
Haydn composed the symphony in early 1792. At the time, Haydn was in the midst of the first of his two visits to London, under contract to perform a series of new symphonies with an orchestra led by Johann Peter Salomon as concertmaster. The symphony was performed on 2 March 1792 at the Hanover Square Rooms, with Haydn directing the orchestra from the keyboard. The premiere came two weeks after that of Symphony No. 93, and one week before that of the Sinfonia Concertante. Haydn recalled that at the premiere of No. 98, the first and fourth movements were encored.

== Instrumentation ==
The work is scored for one flute, two oboes, two bassoons, two horns, two trumpets, timpani, strings, and cembalo. At the symphony’s premiere, Haydn likely played the cembalo part on a fortepiano, but in many modern performances the part is played on a harpsichord, which is what the German word cembalo means. The cembalo part is only scored for a brief solo in the fourth movement, but Haydn would have conducted the premiere sitting at the keyboard and probably used it in a continuo role throughout the whole of the symphony.

In modern performances, the B♭ horn part is commonly played with B♭ basso, rather than B♭ alto, horns. It is likely that B♭ basso horns were preferred in the 1792 premiere, making the symphony the first of Haydn’s to employ the instrument. The trumpet and timpani parts are also scored in B♭.

== Movements ==
The symphony is in four movements:

1. Adagio – Allegro, 2/2
2. Adagio, 3/4
3. Menuetto. Presto, 3/4
4. Finale. Presto, 6/8

=== I. Adagio – Allegro ===
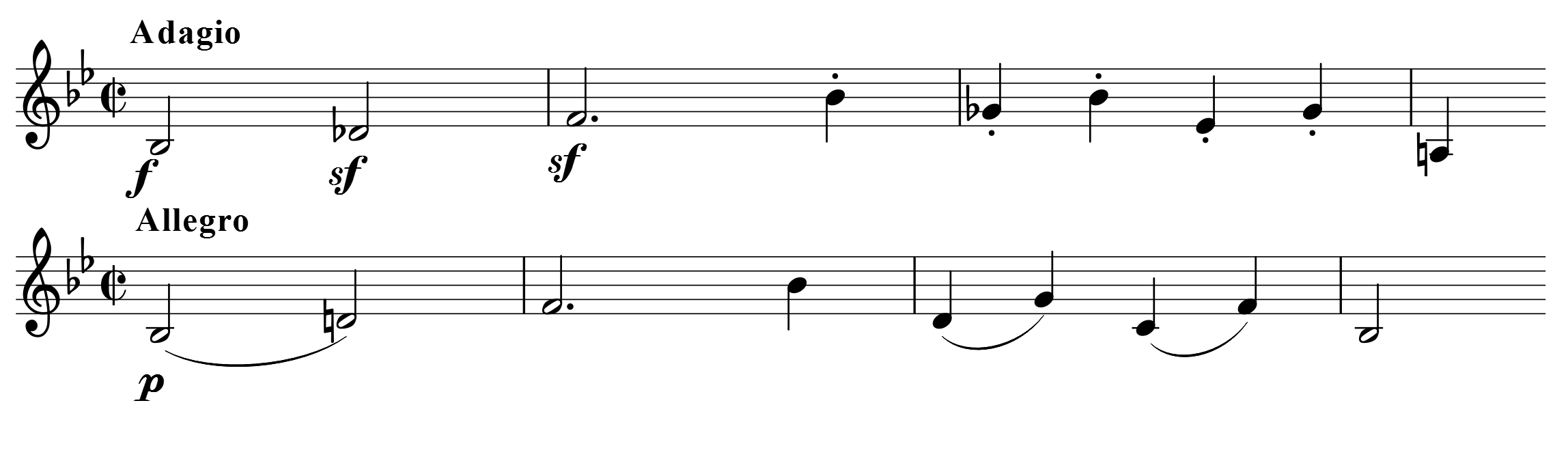
The first line shows the first four measures (first violins) of the Adagio introduction to the first movement. The second line shows the first four measures (first violins) of the movement's Allegro section, which serves as the principal theme of the sonata form movement.

The first movement is in sonata form and is preceded by an introduction marked "Adagio". The introduction is in B♭ minor, and consists of three differing statements of an upwards broken chord, followed by a downward motion.

Haydn then uses the introductory motif as the primary theme of the "Allegro" section of the movement, although this time it is in B♭ major. The use of common thematic material in an introduction and a movement proper is an uncommon compositional device for the time. After its first statement in the Allegro, the motif then proceeds to dominate the entire movement. The exposition modulates to the dominant (F major), as is conventional for a sonata form movement in a major key, but no new theme is presented. Instead, the opening theme, albeit in a varied form, is reprised in the new key. The sonata can thus be called monothematic. After the exposition follows a long development section, then a recapitulation that involves unusually significant variations to the material presented in the exposition.

=== II. Adagio ===
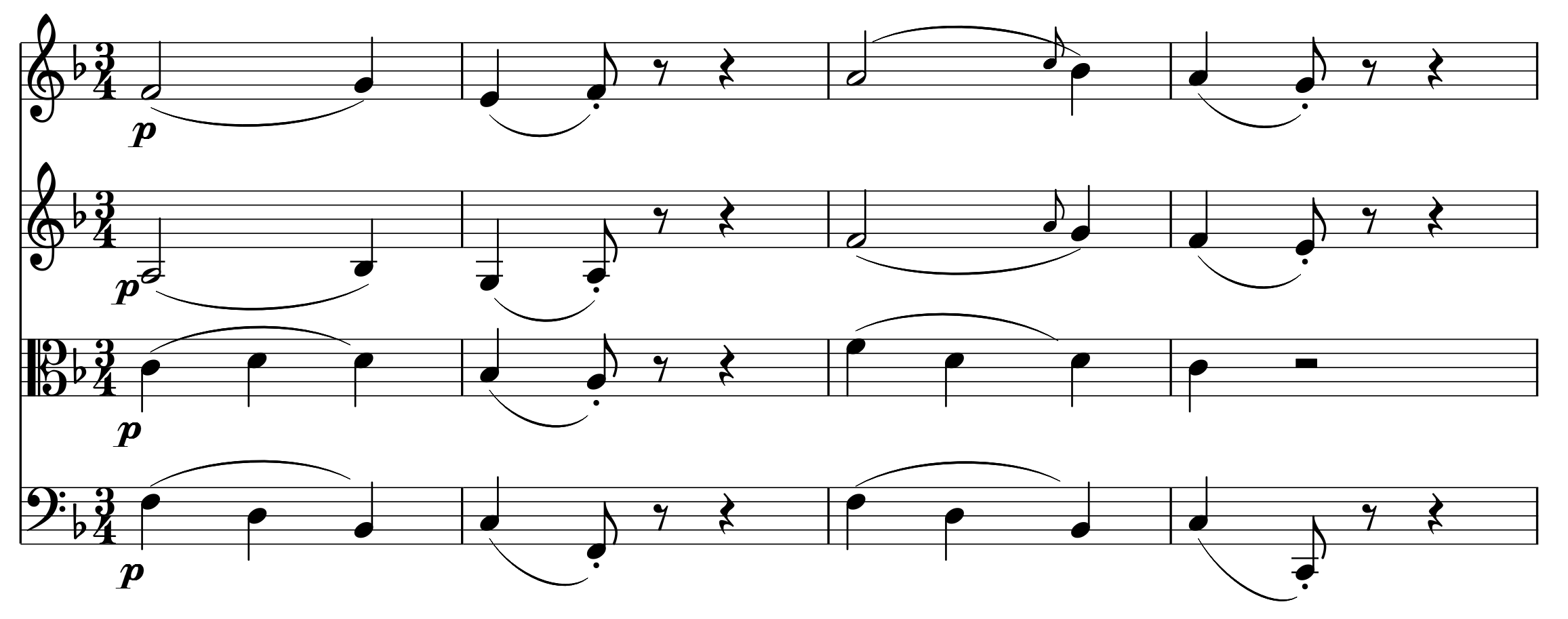
The strings introduce the main theme of the second movement (measures 1 to 4). The theme is almost identical to the Agnus Dei in Mozart's Coronation Mass. Haydn would return to the theme in his Harmoniemesse.

The movement is in F major and sonata form. There are no trumpet or timpani parts. The movement, solemn and hymn-like, makes noticeable use of material from two works by Mozart, the Coronation Mass and Symphony No. 41 ("Jupiter"), and it was possibly intended by Haydn as a tribute to his friend and fellow-composer, who died in December 1791: Haydn was composing the symphony when he heard, and was greatly distressed by, the news of his friend's death.

The movement's principal theme, introduced by the strings and marked "cantabile", is an almost exact quotation from Agnus Dei from Mozart's Coronation Mass; a resemblance to "God Save the King" has also been noted. The second theme is in the dominant (C major). The exposition is not repeated. Instead there is a transition section into the development. It is in this transition that the quotation from Mozart's Jupiter Symphony appears.

The recapitulation involves new treatments of the principal theme: on its first reprise, the theme is accompanied by a passage for solo cello in counterpoint. After the second theme is reprised, the oboes present the first theme again. Six measures from the end of the movement, the first two measures of the theme are presented for a final time, by an oboe and a bassoon with a chromatic accompaniment from the strings. The movement then fades to a pianissimo conclusion. The chromaticism accompanying the final statement of the theme was omitted from published editions of the symphony until the 1950s, when H. C. Robbins Landon restored Haydn's original score.

Haydn went on to quote the Agnus Dei of Mozart's Coronation Mass even more exactly in the Agnus Dei of his own Harmoniemesse, and his scoring reflects that of the Adagio in his Symphony 98.

=== III. Menuetto. Presto ===
The third movement is a fast minuet and trio. The minuet is in B♭ major. Its second section starts conventionally in the dominant of F major but shifts into A♭ major for a flute solo. The trio remains in B♭ major, but omits the trumpets, horns and timpani. The music critic Michael Steinberg described the trio as "gently rustic".

=== IV. Finale. Presto ===
The fourth movement is the longest finale among Haydn's symphonies. It is in sonata form and 6/8 time. The exposition is repeated, and after it concludes in the dominant of F major, there is a lengthy pause before the development commences in A♭ major. The development contains modulations through a wide range of keys and prominent solos for the principal violin who, in the premiere performance, was Johann Peter Salomon. The principal violin's part continues into the beginning of the recapitulation when it plays the first theme as a solo. After the recapitulation there is a lengthy coda, in which Haydn slows the tempo to "piu moderato" but then introduces sixteenth notes to give the movement a new momentum. Towards the end of the coda comes the surprising keyboard solo, consisting of an 11-measure passage of sixteenth notes.

Haydn was not a keyboard virtuoso. But the composer and organist Samuel Wesley, who was at the 1792 premiere, recollected that Haydn had executed the keyboard solo proficiently:

"His Performance on the Piano Forte, although not such as to stamp him a first rate artist upon that Instrument, was indisputably neat and distinct. In the Finale of one of his Symphonies is a Passage of attractive Brilliancy, which he has given to the Piano Forte, and which the Writer of this Memoir remembers him to have executed with the utmost Accuracy and Precision."

A typical performance of the symphony lasts about 26 minutes.
