= 1792 in music =

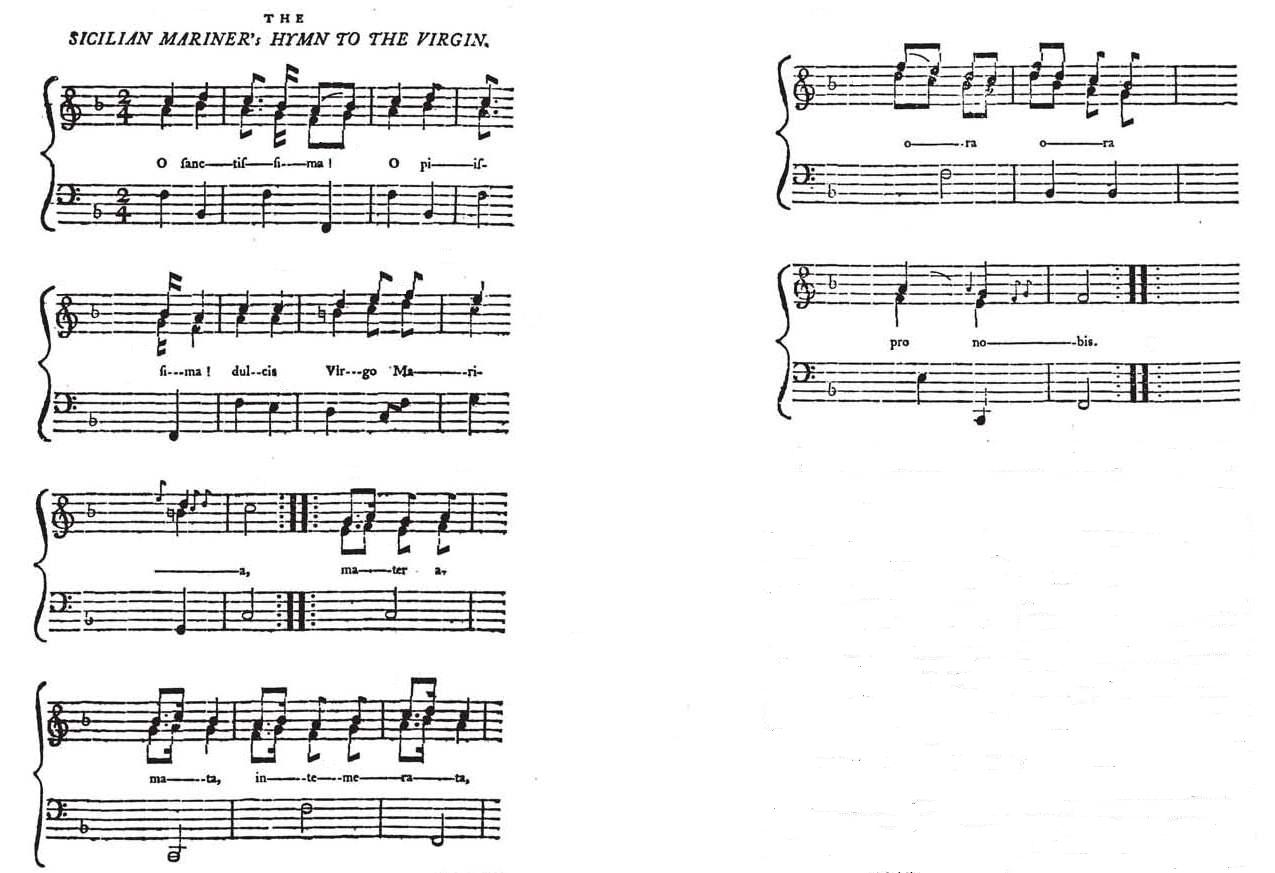
Earliest known printing of O Sanctissima is printed (1792)

== Events ==
- January 26 – Harriet Wainwright's opera Comala is performed at the Hanover Square Rooms in London. Charles Burney and Joseph Haydn are in the audience and praise the work.
- April 13 – Joseph Martin Kraus's Symphonie funèbre is played at the funeral of Gustavus III of Sweden.
- May 16 – La Fenice in Venice is inaugurated with a performance of Giovanni Paisiello's opera I giuochi d'Agrigento.
- July 11–14 – The Belfast Harp Festival in Ireland brings together and records the work of most of the remaining traditional players of the clàrsach. It is organised by Dr. James McDonnell, Robert Bradshaw and Henry Joy McCracken in the Assembly Rooms, Belfast, and Edward Bunting is one of three transcribers of the music.

== Bands disbanded ==
- The Academy of Ancient Music (formed 1726)

== Popular Music ==
- "Ye brave sons of Britain" by William Parsons
- "Chant de guerre pour l'armée du Rhin" aka "La Marseillaise" by Claude Joseph Rouget de Lisle

== Classical music ==
- Claude Balbastre – Marche des Marseillois et l'air Ça-ira
- Ludwig van Beethoven
  - "An Laura", for voice and piano, WoO 112
  - "An Minna", for voice and piano, WoO 115
  - Rondino for oboes, clarinets, horns, and bassoons in E-flat major, WoO 25
  - Duo for 2 Flutes, WoO 26
  - Six Variations on a Swiss song for piano or harp, WoO 64
  - Trinklied, WoO 109
  - Variations on an original theme in E♭ major for violin, cello, and piano, Op. 44
  - Octet for winds in E♭ major, Op. 103
- Muzio Clementi – 3 Piano Trios, Op. 28
- Jan Ladislav Dussek – Piano Concerto No.4, Op. 17
- Josef Gelinek – 6 Variations on "Ein Mädchen oder Weibchen"
- Joseph Haydn
  - Symphony No. 94
  - Symphony No. 97
  - Symphony No. 98
  - 12 Minuets, Hob.IX:11
  - 150 Scottish Songs, Hob.XXXIa:1–150
- Johann Nepomuk Hummel – Trio for piano, violin and cello, no. 1
- Joseph Martin Kraus – Symphonie funebre in C minor
- Friedrich Wilhelm Pannenberg – Zwölf Sleiver und zwey Quadrille
- Johann Franz Xaver Sterkel
  - Symphony in D major, StWV 128
  - Symphony in B-flat major, StWV 129
  - 3 Violin Sonatas, StWV 198

== Opera ==
- Maria Theresia Ahlefeldt – Telemak på Calypsos
- Domenico Cimarosa – Il Matrimonio Segreto
- Giuseppe Farinelli – I dotorato di Pulcinella
- Louis Emmanuel Jadin – Amélie de Montfort
- Etienne Méhul – Stratonice

== Methods and theory writings ==
- John Wall Callcott – An Explanation of the Notes, Marks, Words, etc. Used in Music
- Johann Adam Hiller
  - Anweisung zum Violinspielen
  - Kurze und erleichterte Anweisung zum Singen
- Christian Kalkbrenner – Kurzer Abriß der Geschichte der Tonkunst
- Andrew Law – The Art of Singing

== Births ==
- February 29 – Gioacchino Rossini, composer (died 1868)
- March 11 – Natale Abbadia, composer (died 1861)
- August 28 – Karolina Bock, singer, actress, dancer, drama teacher
- October 2 – Cipriani Potter, pianist and composer (died 1871)
- October 13 – Moritz Hauptmann, writer and composer (died 1868)

== Deaths ==
- February 29 – Johann Andreas Stein, maker of keyboard instruments (born 1728)
- June 28 – Elizabeth Ann Linley, singer (born 1754)
- June 30 – Antonio Rosetti, double bass player and composer (born c. 1750)
- October 11 – Gaetano Guadagni, castrato singer (born 1728)
- November 29 (or 30) – Ernst Wilhelm Wolf, composer (b. 1735)
- December 15 – Joseph Martin Kraus, composer ("the Swedish Mozart") (born 1756)
- December 18 – Johann van Beethoven, singer, father of Ludwig van Beethoven (born 1740)
- date unknown
  - Giovanni Battista Casali, choir-master and choral composer (b. 1715)
  - Mian Ghulam Nabi Shori, composer of Hindustani classical music (b. 1742)
