= Symphony No. 102 (Haydn) =

10th of Haydn 's 12 London Symphonies

- by Joseph Haydn
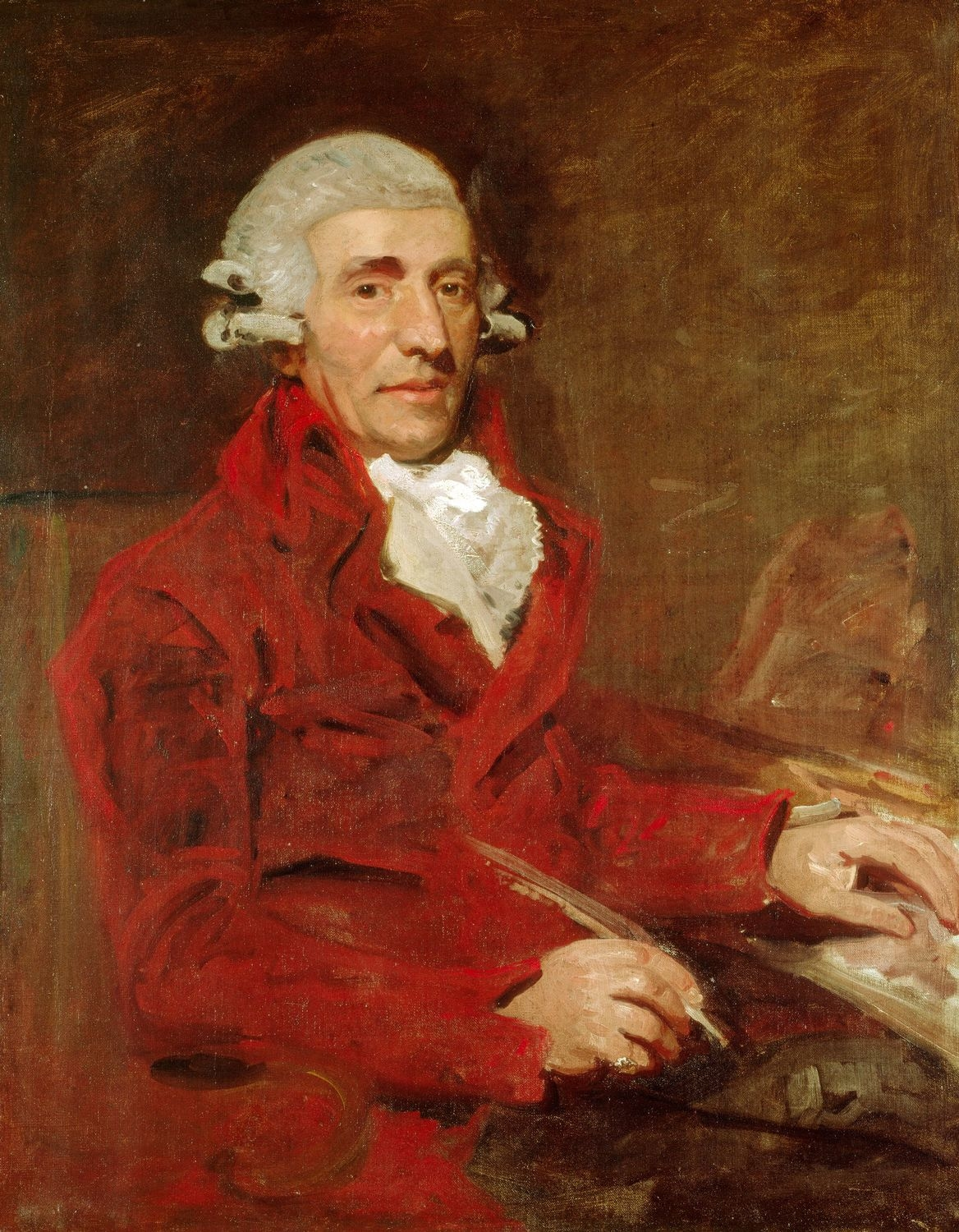
- Haydn in around 1792
- Key: B♭ major
- Catalogue: Hob. I:102
- Composed: 1794
- Duration: c. 27-30 minutes
- Movements: 4
- Scoring: Orchestra

Premiere
- Date: May 1795
- Location: King's Theatre, London
- Conductor: Joseph Haydn

The Symphony No. 102 in B♭ major, Hoboken I/102, is the tenth of the twelve London symphonies written by Joseph Haydn, at the instigation of impresario Johann Peter Salomon. It is one of three symphonies he worked on in 1794, along with his 103rd and 104th symphonies.

Despite being lesser-known than many of the other works in the group, it is sometimes viewed as Haydn's best symphony, in terms of successful use of compositional strengths unified in a quality undisturbed throughout the work.

A typical performance lasts roughly 27 minutes.

== Background ==
The symphony was completed in the summer of 1794, and premiered at benefit concerts at the King's Theatre in May 1795 with Haydn himself conducting. It is now believed by many scholars to be the symphony at the premiere of which a chandelier fell from the ceiling of the concert hall in which it was performed. According to the Morning Chronicle (3 February 1795), "The last movement was encored; and not withstanding an interruption by the accidental fall of one of the chandeliers, it was performed with no less effect." The audience escaped unharmed, supposedly because they had rushed the stage to get a better view of Haydn. It was long believed that this "miracle" event took place at the premiere of his Symphony No. 96, which had happened in 1791.

== Music ==
The work is scored for two flutes, two oboes, two bassoons, two horns, two trumpets, timpani and strings. It is the only symphony in the second set (99–104) of so called London Symphonies (93–104) where the composer dispenses with the clarinets. It is in standard four-movement form:

1. Largo assai — Allegro Vivace
2. Adagio in F major
3. Menuetto. Allegretto
4. Finale. Presto

The second movement is an orchestration of the second movement of the F♯ minor piano trio, Hob. XV/26, transposed from F♯ major to F major. The repeats in the trio are written out in the symphony, allowing for changes in the orchestration the second time through. The orchestral version also features a rolling triplet accompaniment in the cellos where in the trio the cello simply doubles the piano's bass line.
