= Johann August Just =

German keyboard player, violinist and composer

Johann August Just (c. 1750 in Gröningen, Holy Roman Empire – December 1791? in The Hague) was a German keyboard player, violinist and composer.

He wrote a number of works for keyboard and chamber ensembles, many of a pedagogical nature, and at least two one-act operas.

He was a pupil of Johann Kirnberger, and later became music master to the Princess of Orange.

There is much uncertainty about his date of birth (variously given as 1750, 1758, or 1760) and date and place of death. It appears that he was born in Gröningen in Germany, but a number of reference articles have confused this with Groningen in the east of the Netherlands.

Some of his works have been recorded by the German ensemble Trio 1790.

== Works (incomplete list) ==
=== Keyboard and chamber ensemble ===
- Opus 1: Six divertissements pour clavecin et violon
- Opus 2: Six sonates pour le clavecin ou le piano-forte, avec accompagnement de violon ou flûte et violoncelle ad libitum - also referred to as Piano trios
- Opus 3: Six favourite sonatinas for the harpsichord composed for the use of beginners
- Opus 4: Six concertos with instrumental parts for a violon principal with accompaniments
- Opus 5: Six sonatinas for the harpsichord with an accompaniment for a violin for the use of young practitioners and a favorite march with variations
- Opus 6: Six divertissements pour clavecin ou forte-piano avec accompagnement de violon
- Opus 7: Six sonates pour le clavecin ou piano-forte avec accompagnement d'un violon obligé
- Opus 11: Six sonates aisées pour clavecin ou forte-piano avec accompagnement de violon
- Opus 12: Six divertissements pour le clavecin ou piano-forte à quatres mains
- Opus 17: Six duos à deux violons
- Minuet (for keyboard, two hands) (No opus number) in: New instructions for playing the harpsichord, piano-forte or spinnet etc.

=== Operas ===
- (in Dutch) Opera (Singspiel) in one act: De sympathie, Amsterdam, 1772
- (in Dutch) Opera (Singspiel) in one act: De koopman van Smyrna (The merchant of Smyrna), Amsterdam, 1773
- (in Dutch) Opera Le page, The Hague, 1777
