= Symphony No. 94 (Haydn) =

Musical work of Joseph Haydn, composed in 1791

- Surprise
- by Joseph Haydn
- Haydn in 1791
- Key: G major
- Catalogue: Hob. I:94
- Composed: 1791
- Duration: c. 25 minutes
- Movements: 4
- Scoring: Orchestra

Premiere
- Date: 23 March 1792
- Location: Hanover Square Rooms, London
- Conductor: Joseph Haydn

The Symphony No. 94 in G major (H. 1/94) is the second of the twelve London symphonies written by Joseph Haydn. It is popularly known as the Surprise Symphony. Haydn wrote the symphony in 1791 in London for a concert series he gave during the first of his visits to England (1791–1792). The premiere took place at the Hanover Square Rooms in London on 23 March 1792, with Haydn leading the orchestra seated at a fortepiano.

A typical performance of the symphony lasts about 23-25 minutes.

== Nickname ==
Like with most of Haydn's symphonies with nicknames, "Surprise" did not originate with him.

In his old age, his biographer Georg August Griesinger asked him whether he wrote this "surprise" to awaken the audience. Haydn replied:

No, but I was interested in surprising the public with something new, and in making a brilliant debut, so that my student Pleyel, who was at that time engaged by an orchestra in London (in 1792) and whose concerts had opened a week before mine, should not outdo me. The first Allegro of my symphony had already met with countless Bravos, but the enthusiasm reached its highest peak at the Andante with the Drum Stroke. Encore! Encore! sounded in every throat, and Pleyel himself complimented me on my idea.

The work was popular at its premiere. The Woodfall's Register critic wrote:

The third piece of Haydn was a new Overture [i.e. symphony], of very extraordinary merit. It was simple, profound, and sublime. The andante movement was particularly admired.

The Morning Herald critic wrote:

The Room was crowded last night... A new composition from such a man as Haydn is a great event in the history of music. – His novelty of last night was a grand Overture, the subject of which was remarkably simple, but extended to vast complication, exquisitly [sic] modulated and striking in effect. Critical applause was fervid and abundant.

The symphony is still popular today, and is frequently performed and recorded. It is perhaps Haydn's most popular one.

== Music ==
I. Adagio – Vivace assai

II. Andante

III. Menuetto (Allegro molto)

IV. Finale (Allegro molto)
Performed by the Boston Symphony Orchestra, Serge Koussevitzky conducting

The Surprise Symphony is scored for a Classical-era orchestra consisting of two each of flutes, oboes, bassoons, horns, trumpets, plus timpani, and the usual string section consisting of violins (first and second), violas, cellos, and double basses.

Like all of Haydn's "London" symphonies, the work is in four movements, marked as follows:

1. Adagio cantabile – Vivace assai
2. Andante
3. Menuetto: Allegro molto
4. Finale: Allegro molto

=== I. Adagio cantabile – Vivace assai ===
The first movement has a lyrical 3/4 introduction preceding a highly rhythmic main section in 6/8 time.

=== II. Andante ===
The second movement, an andante, is a theme and variations in 2/4 time in the subdominant key of C major. The theme is in two eight-bar sections, each repeated. The repeat at the end of the first section is pianissimo with pizzicato in the lower strings to set up the surprise.

Measures 1 to 16 of the first violin part in the second movement.The "surprise" arrives in measure 16, when the rest of the orchestra joins the first violins in a fortissimo G-major chord.

Four variations of the theme follow, starting with embellishment in sixteenth notes by the first violins, moving to a stormy variation in C minor with trumpets and timpani, followed by solos for the first oboist and flautist, and concluding with a sweeping and lyrical forte repeat in triplets. In the coda section, the opening notes are stated once more, this time reharmonized with gently dissonant diminished seventh chords over a tonic pedal.

Haydn's music contains many jokes, and the Surprise Symphony includes probably the most famous of all: a sudden fortissimo chord at the end of the otherwise piano opening theme in the variation-form second movement. The music then returns to its original quiet dynamic as if nothing has happened, and the ensuing variations do not repeat the joke. In German, the work is referred to as the Symphony mit dem Paukenschlag, or, with the kettledrum stroke.

=== III. Menuetto: Allegro molto ===
The third movement is a minuet and trio, in ternary form in the tonic key (G major). The tempo, allegro molto (very quickly), is of note since it marks the historical shift away from the old minuet (which was played at a slower, danceable, tempo) toward the scherzo; by his last quartets Haydn had started marking his minuets presto.

=== IV. Finale: Allegro molto ===
The fourth movement is a characteristically rhythmic, energetic and propulsive Haydn finale. The movement is written in sonata rondo form with the opening bars appearing both at the beginning and in the middle of the development section. The stirring coda emphasizes the timpani.

== Later uses ==
Toward the end of his active career, Haydn wove the theme of the second movement into an aria of his oratorio The Seasons (1801), in which the bass soloist depicts a plowman whistling Haydn's tune as he works.

The same theme is also frequently adapted for the purpose of teaching musical beginners; see Papa Haydn.

The composer Charles Ives wrote a parody of the second movement in 1909, penning the words "Nice little easy sugar-plum sounds" under the opening notes. Ives was unhappy with concert audiences who unadventurously resisted difficult modern music—as is shown by other words in his parody: "Nice sweety silk bonnet melodies ... nice pretty perfumed sounds for the dress circle cushion chai[r] ears." Since the opening notes of Haydn's second movement are very simple, they were a suitable choice for Ives's purpose.

Donald Swann created a version of the Surprise Symphony 'with extra surprises' for the humorous Hoffnung Music Festival.

== See also ==
- List of symphonies with names
- Evolution of timpani in the 18th and 19th centuries

== Notes ==
=== Sources ===
- Landon, H. C. Robbins (1976). Haydn: Chronicle and Works. Vol. 3. Bloomington: Indiana University Press.
- Sinclair, James B (1999). A Descriptive Catalogue of the Music of Charles Ives. New Haven: Yale University Press. ISBN 0-300-07601-0.
