= Symphony No. 95 (Haydn) =

Symphony written by Joseph Haydn

- by Joseph Haydn
- Haydn in 1791
- Key: C minor
- Catalogue: Hob. I:95
- Composed: 1791
- Duration: 20 minutes
- Movements: 4
- Scoring: Orchestra

Premiere
- Date: 1791
- Location: Hanover Square Rooms, London
- Conductor: Joseph Haydn

The Symphony No. 95 in C minor (Hoboken I:95) is the third of the twelve London symphonies (numbers 93–104) written by Joseph Haydn. It is the only one of the twelve London symphonies in a minor key and the only one without a slow introduction.

It was completed in 1791 as one of the set of symphonies composed for his first trip to London and was first performed at the Hanover Square Rooms in London during the season of 1791. The exact date of the premiere is unknown.

== Movements ==
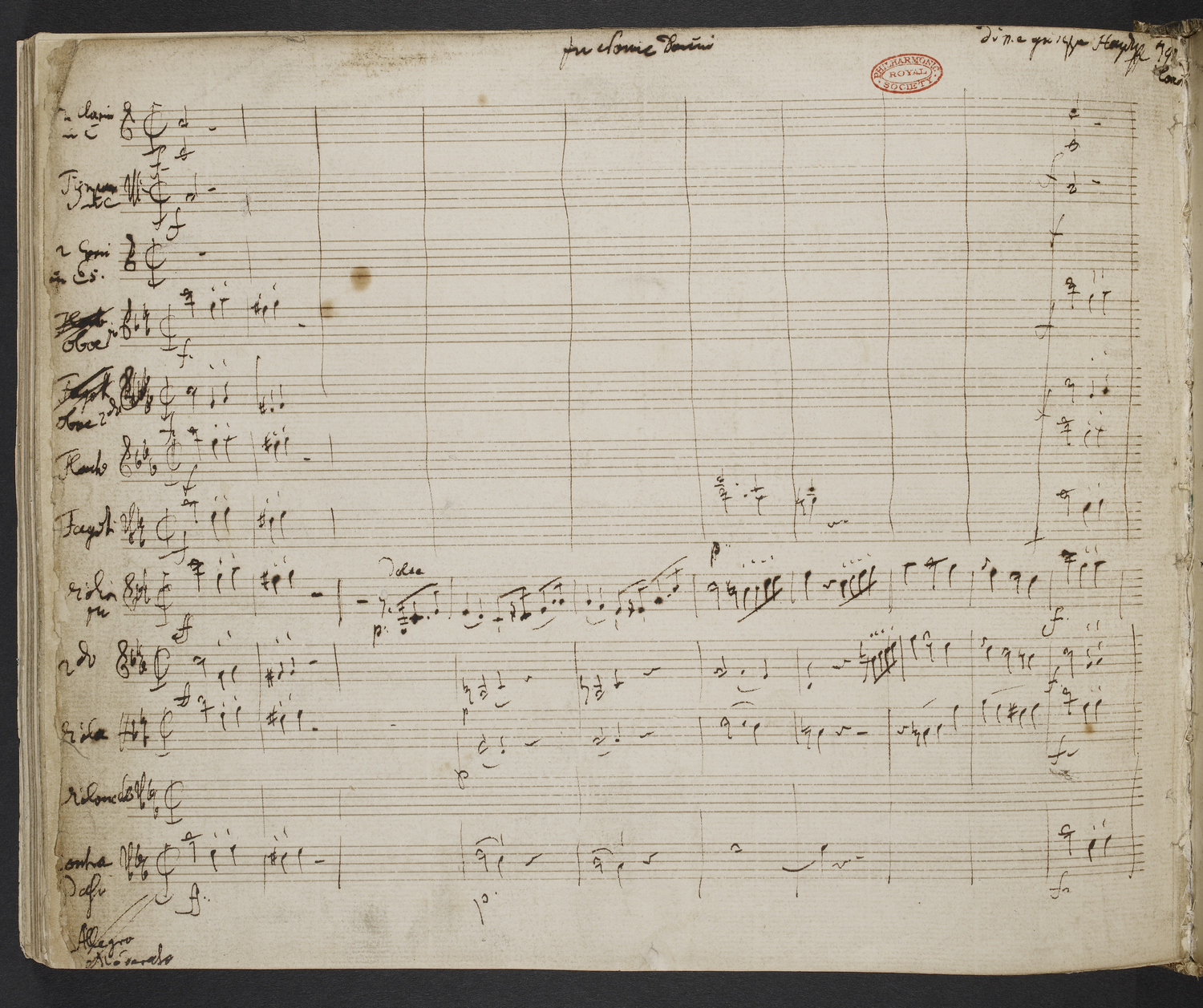
Starting bars of the first movement in Haydn's hand

The symphony is scored for flute, two oboes, two bassoons, two horns, two trumpets, timpani and strings.

It is in standard four-movement form:

1. Allegro moderato (sonata form; C minor, ending in C major)
2. Andante (variation form; E♭ major)
3. Menuetto – Trio (ternary form, C minor, trio in C major)
4. Finale: Vivace (rondo form; C major)

The first movement opens with the main theme, which consists of two contrasting parts—the first is strong in character and the second is more lyrical. The transition to the relative major has elements of the head of the main theme. The secondary theme contrasts the main theme by being very subtle in nature, and has a dance-like rhythm. The exposition concludes with a strong codetta. The development is primarily built around the head of the main theme, which is thoroughly developed. The recapitulation omits the head of the main theme, and the secondary theme is recapitulated in C major, thus ending the movement in a major key.

It is the only one of the London symphonies that does not begin with a slow introduction to the first movement.

The trio of the minuet is a solo for the cello.

The finale opens with the following theme:

The first two bars of this theme are the basis for an extensive section of counterpoint in the middle of the movement.
