= 1793 in music =

== Events ==
- January 2 – Premiere of Mozart's Requiem (completed after the composer's death in 1791 by Joseph Eybler and Franz Xaver Süssmayr) in a performance for the benefit of Mozart's widow, Constanze, arranged by Gottfried van Swieten. On December 14 it is sung in memory of the wife of Count Franz von Walsegg, who commissioned it, in the Cistercian Neukloster Abbey at Wiener-Neustadt.
- September 25 – The Chevalier de Saint-Georges, the "black Mozart", loses his command and is imprisoned at Houdainville.
- Niccolò Paganini debuts as a violin virtuoso at age 11 in his birthplace of Genoa.
- Westminster Quarters first written, for the bells of a new clock at the Church of St Mary the Great, Cambridge, by Prof. Joseph Jowett, probably with Prof. John Randall or William Crotch.

== Popular Music ==
- Nehemiah Shumway – The American Harmony, including "Schenectady"
- George Thomson – A Select Collection of Original Scottish Airs for the Voice

== Classical music ==
- Jean-Jacques Beauvarlet-Charpentier – Variations on La Marseillaise
- Ludwig van Beethoven – Ein Selbstgespräch, WoO 114
- Domenico Cimarosa – Concerto for 2 Flutes in G major, G.1077
- Muzio Clementi
  - 3 Piano Trios, Op. 29
  - 3 Piano Trios, Op. 32
- Jan Ladislav Dussek
  - 6 Piano Sonatinas, Op. 19
  - Piano Concerto No.5, Op. 22
  - The Sufferings of the Queen of France, Op. 23
- Joseph Haydn
  - Symphony No. 99
  - String Quartets, Opp. 71 & 74 "Apponyi"
  - Variations in F minor
  - 12 German Dances, Hob.IX:10
  - Piano Trio in G major, Hob.XV:32
- Michael Haydn – Missa in honorem Sanctae Ursulae
- Leopold Kozeluch – Three Piano Sonatas, Op. 38
- Giovanni Battista Viotti – Violin Concerto No.26 in B-flat major
- Paul Wranitzky
  - Concerto for Flute in D major, Op. 24
  - Six String Quartets, Op. 23

== Opera ==
- Felice Alessandri – Virginia
- Samuel Arnold – The Mountaineers
- Thomas Attwood – Ozmyn and Daraxa
- François-Adrien Boïeldieu – La fille coupable
- Domenico Cimarosa – I traci amanti
- Francesco Gardi – Pirro
- Johann Baptist Henneberg – Die Waldmänner
- Étienne Méhul – Le jeune sage et le vieux fou
- Johann Friedrich Reichardt – Erwin und Elmire
- Josef Seger – 8 Toccatas and Fugues
- Daniel Steibelt – Roméo et Juliette

== Methods and theory writings ==
- Pierre Baillot – Méthode de Violon
- Joseph Frike – A Guide in Harmony
- Othon-Joseph Vandenbroek – Traité général de tous les instruments à vent
- Georg Joseph Vogler – Verbesserung der Forkel’schen Veränderungen über 'God save the King'

== Births ==
- January 18 – William Henry Havergal, hymn-writer and composer (d. 1870)
- February 14 – William Crathern, composer of sacred music (d. c.1851)
- February 27 – Elisabeth Frösslind, opera singer (d. 1861)
- July 22 – Eugène Walckiers, composer (died 1866)
- August 21 – Peter Casper Krossing, composer (d. 1838)
- September 2 – Caroline Ridderstolpe, composer (d. 1878)
- December 26 – François Hünten, composer (died 1878)
- date unknown – William Bartholomew, arranger and composer (died 1867)

== Deaths ==
- January 24 (bur.) – Marged ferch Ifan, harpist and wrestler (b. 1696)
- March 17 – Leopold Hofmann, composer (b. 1738)
- May 3 – Martin Gerbert, music writer (b. 1720)
- May 7 – Pietro Nardini, composer (b. 1722)
- July 26 – Alessandro Besozzi, Italian composer (born 1702)
- September 10 – Marc-Antoine Désaugiers, opera composer (b. 1742)
- September 14 – Benjamin Cooke, organist and composer (b. 1734)
- October 21 – Johann Hartmann, composer (b. 1726)
- October 25 – Giovanni Battista Ferrandini, composer (b. 1710)
- date unknown
  - Philip Phile, violinist and composer (b. c.1734)
  - Marie-Anne-Catherine Quinault, singer and composer (b. 1695)
