= 1794 in music =

This is a list of events in music in 1794. This year is notable for the overlap of compositions by both Haydn and Beethoven, a critical turning point in the history of music, and by the horrific execution by guillotine of a whole generation of French composers and poets in July, at the end of the Reign of Terror.

== Events ==
- Joseph Haydn begins his second visit to London
- Carl Ditters von Dittersdorf is expelled from the Jánský Vrch Castle after a dispute with his patron Philipp Gotthard von Schaffgotsch, ending nearly a quarter of a century in his service there.

== Popular music ==
- "Looney's Lamentation for Miss Margery Muggins", from British panto performance. Grew in popularity in UK after being covered in 1809 by Joseph Grimaldi in Castles in the Air or Columbine Cowslip

== Classical music ==
- Ludwig van Beethoven – String Trio No. 1 in E-flat major
- William Billings – The Continental Harmony
- Benjamin Carr – The Federal Overture
- Domenico Cimarosa – Il trionfo della fede, sacred oratorio premiered May 3 in Naples
- Muzio Clementi
  - Violin Sonata in C major, Op.30
  - Flute Sonata in A major, Op.31
  - 3 Piano Sonatas, Op. 33
  - Piano Trio, WO 6
- Jan Ladislav Dussek – 12 Leçons progressives
- Anton Eberl – Piano Sonata in C minor, Op. 1
- Joseph Eybler
  - Christmas Oratorio
  - 3 String Quartets, Op. 1
- Lev Gurilyov – Piano Sonata No.1
- Joseph Haydn
  - Symphony No. 100 in G major, "Military"
  - Symphony No. 101 in D major, "Clock"
  - Symphony No. 102 in B-flat major, Hob.I:102
  - Divertimento in C major, Hob.IV:1
  - Divertimento in G major, Hob.IV:4
  - Piano Trios, Op.36
  - Piano Trio in G major, Hob.XV:32
  - Piano Sonata No. 51 in D major, Hob XVI:51
  - Piano Sonata No. 52 in E-flat, Hob XVI:52
  - 6 Psalms, Hob.XXIII:suppl.
  - 6 English Canzonettas, Hob.XXVIa:25-30
- Johann Nepomuk Hummel – 3 Fugues, Op. 7
- Jean Xavier Lefèvre – Clarinet Concerto No.4 in G minor, IJL 1
- Johann Simon Mayr – La Passione, oratorio in Italian
- Etienne Nicolas Méhul – Chant du départ
- F. D Mouchy – La Mort de Louis XVI, Op.3
- William Parkinson – 3 Sonatas for the pianoforte or harpsichord, Op. 1
- William Parsons – The Court Minuets for His Majesty's Birth Day, 1794
- Ignaz Pleyel – 3 Keyboard Trios, B.446-448
- Pierre Rode – Air varié, Op.10
- Antonio Rosetti – Symphony in F major, M.A49/I:25 or 24
- Friedrich Wilhelm Rust – Keyboard Sonata No. 12 in D major, CzaR 11
- Giovanni Battista Viotti – Violin Concerto No.27 in C major
- Christoph Ernst Friedrich Weyse – Piano Sonatas No. 5-8

== Opera ==
- Luigi Cherubini – Eliza (premiered Dec. 13 in Paris)
- Domenico Cimarosa
  - Le astuzie femminili (premiered Aug. 26 in Naples)
  - Penelope (premiered Dec. 26 in Naples)
- Francois-Joseph Gossec – Le triomphe de la République, RH 618 (divertissement, premiered Jan. 27 in Paris)
- Friedrich Heinrich Himmel – Il primo navigatore
- Johann Simon Mayr – Saffo
- Étienne Méhul – Horatius Coclès, Mélidore et Phrosine
- Carl Ditters von Dittersdorf – Das Gespenst mit der Trommel

== Methods and theory writings ==
- Matthew Camidge – Instructions, 8 Sonatinas, and Useful Preludes
- Francois Devienne – Nouvelle méthode théorique et pratique pour la flûte
- Anton Joseph Hampel – Méthode pour Cor
- Nicola Sala – Regole del contrappunto pratico

== Births ==
- January 6 – Kašpar Mašek, composer (d. 1873)
- April 7 – Giovanni Battista Rubini, tenor
- April 9
  - Aristide Farrenc, musician and music publisher (died 1865)
  - Theobald Boehm, composer and flautist (died 1881)
- May 23 – Ignaz Moscheles, composer and piano virtuoso (d. 1870)
- August 10 – Princess Amalie of Saxony, composer (d. 1870)
- September 10 – François Benoist, organist and composer (d. 1878)
- September 16 – Wenzel Gährich, composer (died 1864)
- September 29 – William Michael Rooke, violinist and composer (d. 1849)
- October 4 – Justina Casagli, operatic soprano
- October 7 – Wilhelm Müller, lyricist (died 1827)
- October 13 – Anselm Hüttenbrenner, composer (d. 1868)
- October 18 – Ferdinand Schubert, Austrian composer (died 1859)
- October 23 – Joseph Panny, composer and violinist (died 1838)
- October 29 – William Bingham Tappan, hymnist (died 1849)
- November 3 – William Cullen Bryant, patron of the arts and poet (died 1878)
- December 6 – Luigi Lablache, operatic bass
- date unknown
  - Mirza Shafi Vazeh, lyricist (died 1852)

== Deaths ==
- April 26 – Johan Foltmar, composer (b. 1714)
- May 6 – Jean-Jacques Beauvarlet-Charpentier, composer and organist (born 1734)
- July 13 – Josse-François-Joseph Benaut, composer and musician (born 1741)
- July 17 – Jean-Frédéric Edelmann, composer (born 1749) (executed by guillotine)
- July 22 – Jean-Benjamin de Laborde, composer (born 1734), (executed by guillotine)
- July 25 – André Chénier, lyricist (born 1762) (executed by guillotine)
- August 7 – Edmund Angerer, composer (born 1740)
- August 11 – Jakob Friedrich Kleinknecht, German composer (born 1722)
- August 25 – Leopold August Abel, composer (b. 1717)
- November 9 – Gregory Skovoroda, poet and composer (b. 1722)
- November 20 – Mattia Verazi, Italian librettist (born c. 1730)
- November 22 – Alison Cockburn, lyricist (born 1712)
