= Johann Peter Salomon =

German violinist, composer, conductor and musical impresario

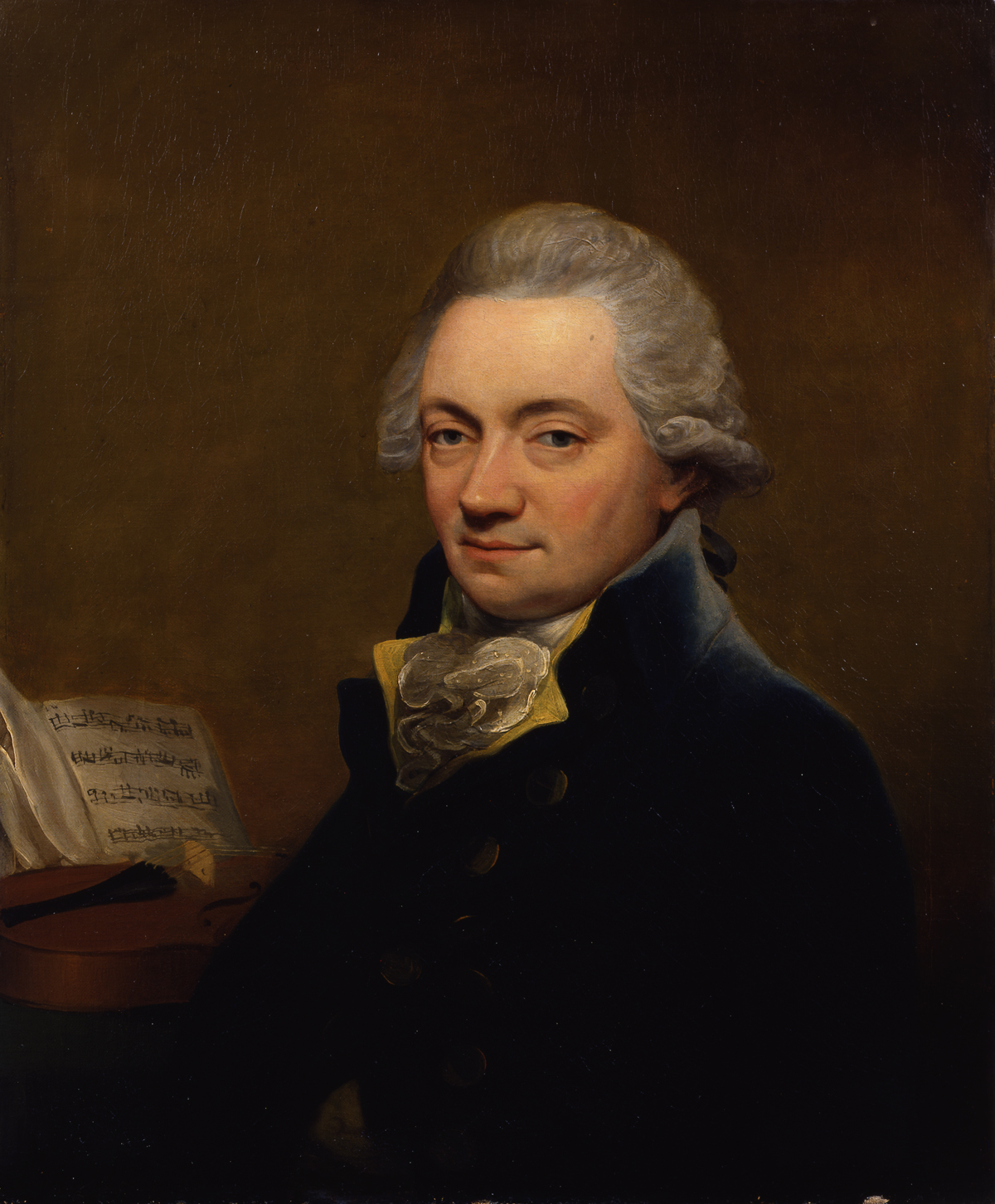
Johann Peter Salomon by Thomas Hardy (1790–92)

Johann Peter Salomon (20 February 1745 [baptized] – 25 November 1815) was a German violinist, composer, conductor and musical impresario. Although an accomplished violinist, he is best known for bringing Joseph Haydn to London and for conducting the symphonies that Haydn wrote during his stay in England. He also knew and worked with Wolfgang Amadeus Mozart and Ludwig van Beethoven.

== Life ==
Johann Peter Salomon was born in January 1745 into a Jewish family in Bonn (but was baptized as an infant) and was the second son of Philipp Salomon, an oboist at the court in Bonn. His birth home was at Bonngasse 515, coincidentally the later birth home of Beethoven. In 1758, at the age of thirteen, he became a violinist in the orchestra of the Elector Clemens August at Bonn.

Seven years later, Salomon went on tour and traveled to Berlin and Frankfort. Following this he arrived in Rheinsberg where he soon became the concert master and composer for the orchestra of Prince Heinrich of Prussia. He composed several works for the court, including four operas and an oratorio. The orchestra of Prince Henrich was where Salomon premiered Joseph Haydn's works. He moved to London in the early 1780s, where he worked as a composer and played violin as a soloist and in a string quartet. In 1786 he orchestrated a series of performances at the Hanover Square Rooms, of which he introduced Haydn and Mozart's symphonies.

While in London, Salomon composed two operas for the Royal Opera, several art songs, a number of concertos, and chamber music pieces. He is perhaps best known today, however, as a concert organizer and conductor.

In 1790 Salomon traveled through Europe to recruit singers for the Italian opera. He was specifically drawn to Vienna since Prince Eszterhazy had recently died. He was focused on persuading Haydn to travel to England, which he did in 1791–92 and 1794–95. He also met Mozart in Vienna as well and tried to get him to come to England too. However Mozart’s wife Constanze was pregnant so he had to refuse which lead to an emotional farewell dinner between Mozart, Haydn and Salomon. Together with Haydn, Salomon premiered many works that Haydn composed while in England. Haydn wrote his symphonies numbers 93 to 104 for these trips, sometimes known as the Salomon symphonies (more widely known as the London symphonies). Salomon is also said to have provided Haydn with the original model for the text of The Creation. He was one of the founder-members of the Philharmonic Society and led the orchestra at its first concert on 8 March 1813.

Salomon is also believed to have given the Jupiter nickname to Wolfgang Amadeus Mozart's Symphony No. 41.

Salomon died aged 70 at his house in Newman Street, Westminster, on 25 November 1815, after a long illness, following an incident in the summer of 1815 when he was thrown from his horse. He is buried in the cloisters of Westminster Abbey.

== Assessment ==
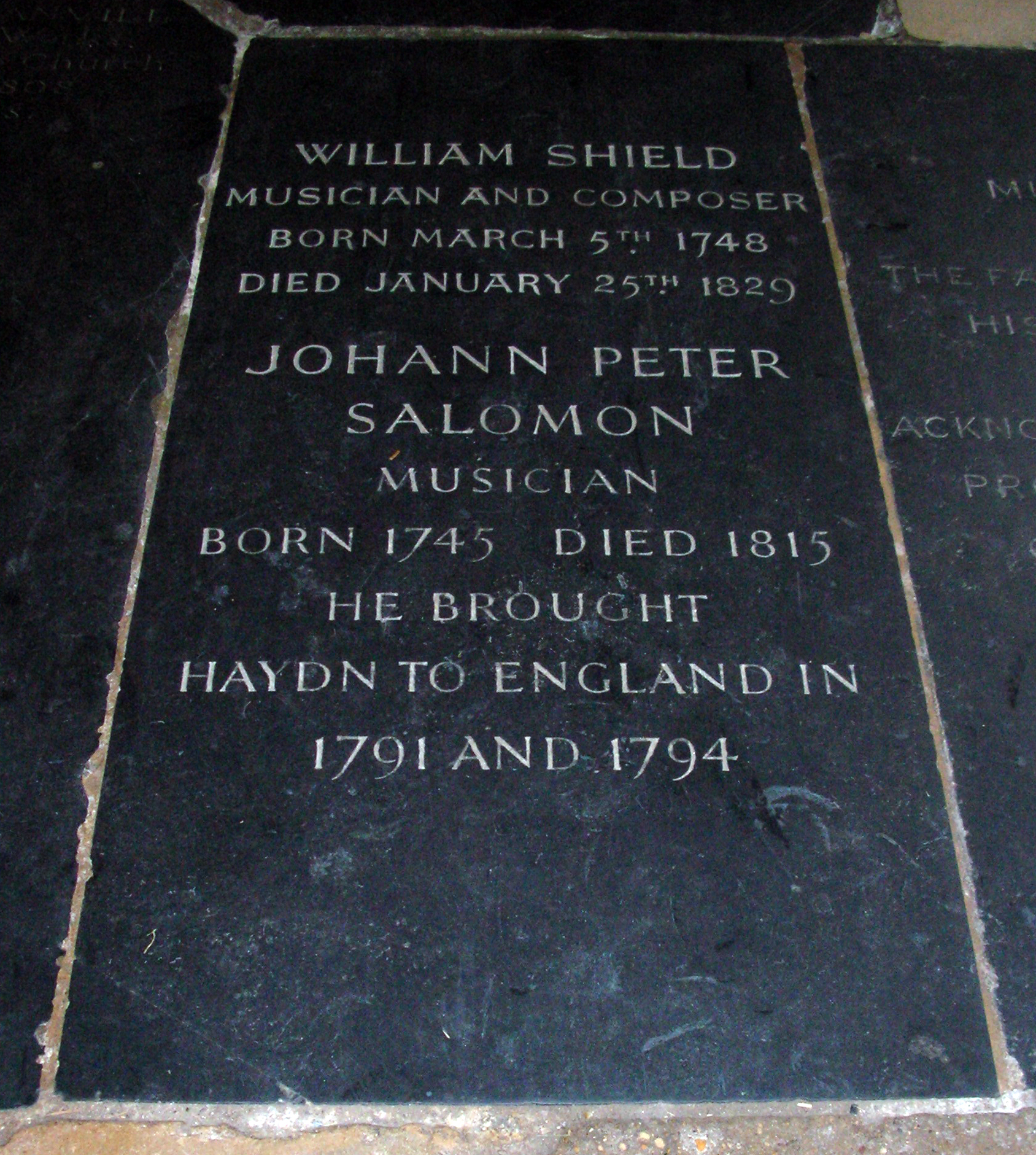
Memorial in south cloister of Westminster Abbey

Salomon's violin playing was highly regarded in his day; for a collection of reviews, see Robbins Landon (1976, 24–27). H.C. Robbins Landon also praises his personal qualities: "Salomon was not only a clever and sensitive impresario, he was also generous, scrupulously honest, and very efficient in business matters." Beethoven, who knew Salomon from his days in Bonn, wrote to Ries on hearing of his death, "Salomon's death grieves me much, for he was a noble man, and I remember him since I was a child."

Since 2011 the Royal Philharmonic Society has awarded the Salomon Prize to highlight talent and dedication within UK orchestras.
