= Hanover Square Rooms =

Historical assembly rooms in Hanover Square, London

Coordinates: 51.5139°N 0.1430°W

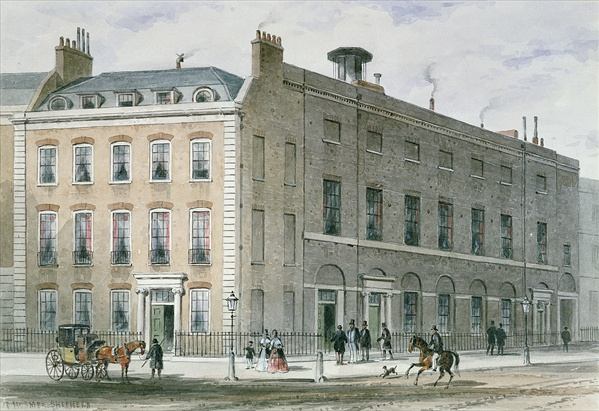
The Hanover Square Rooms on the Southeast corner of Hanover Square (l) and Hanover Street (r)

The Hanover Square Rooms or the Queen's Concert Rooms were assembly rooms established, principally for musical performances, on the corner of Hanover Square, London, England, by Sir John Gallini in partnership with Johann Christian Bach and Carl Friedrich Abel in 1774. For exactly one century this was the principal concert venue in London. The premises were demolished in 1900.

== History of the Rooms ==
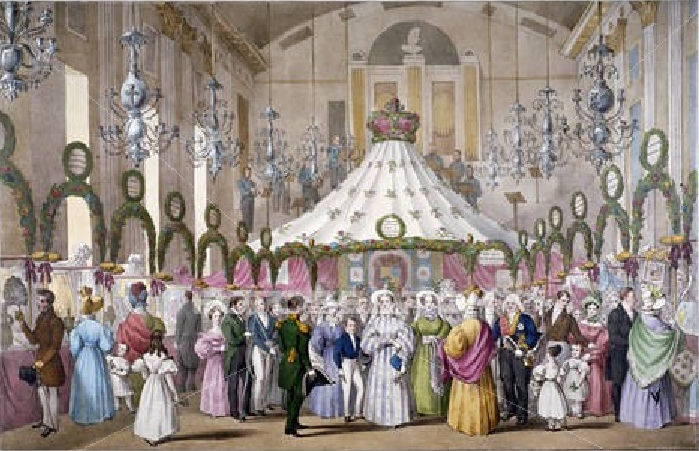
Queen Adelaide attending a fair in aid of distressed foreigners in the Rooms in 1833

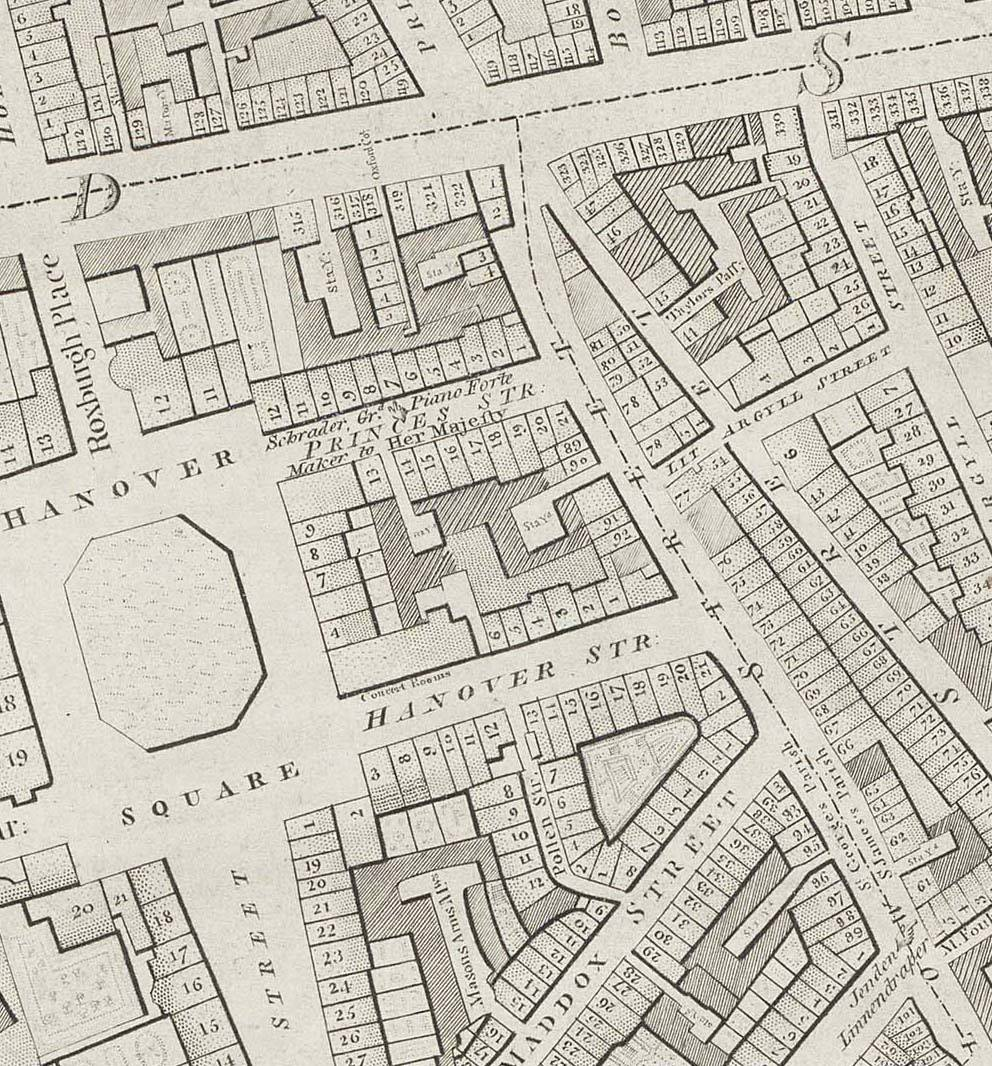
Detail of Hanover Square from Richard Horwood's 1795 map of London. The Hanover Square Rooms are marked as "concert rooms" next to No.4 Hanover Square (click 3x for detail).

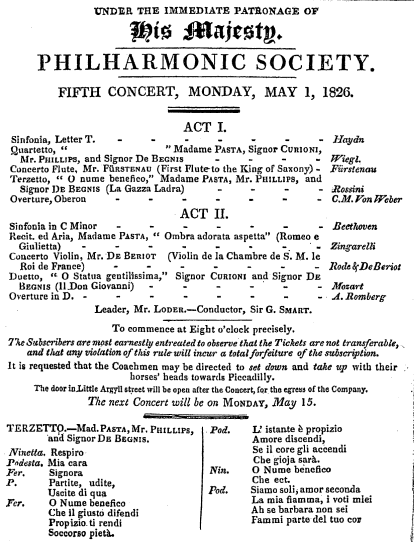
Programme from May 1st 1826

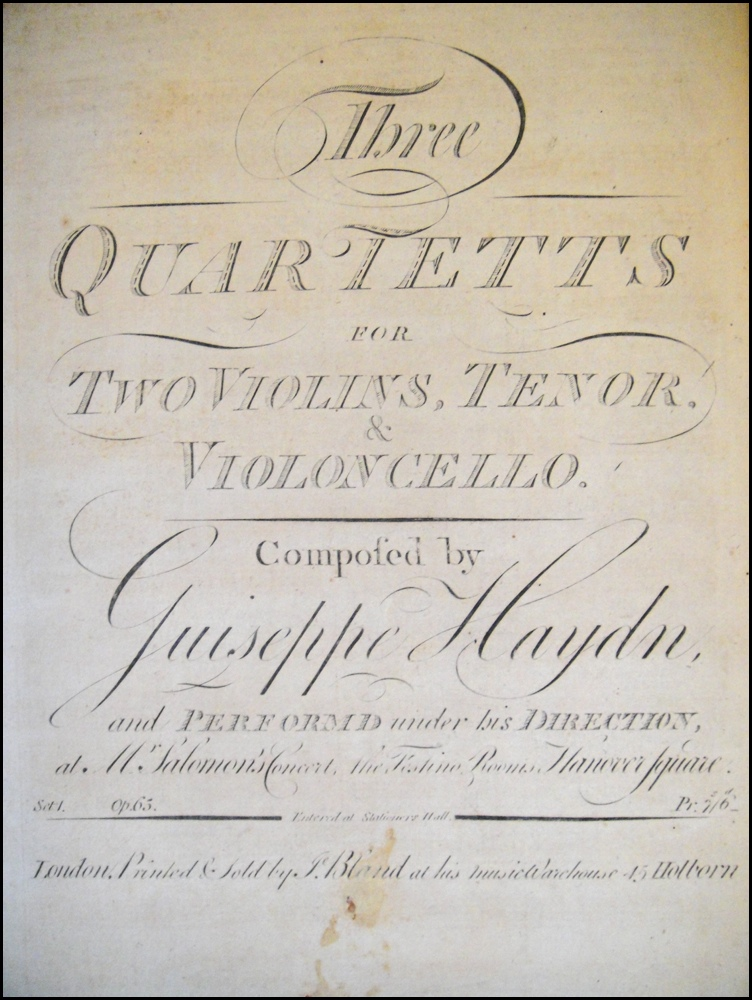
1791 advertisement for three of the Op.64 string quartets of Joseph Haydn, describing them as "performed under his direction at Mr. Salomon's Concert, the Festino Rooms, Hanover Square".

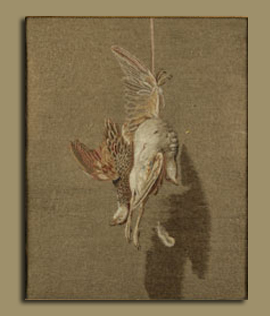
A "needle painting" of a dead bird embroidered by Mary Linwood, exhibited in the Rooms in 1798

The site had previously been occupied by a mill, hence its previous name Mill Field and that of the currently adjoining Mill Street. Originally the property of Earl of Plymouth, leased out to Lord Dillon, in June 1774 it was sold for £5,000 to Viscount Wenman, who on the same day conveyed it to Gallini, Bach and Abel. Gallini owned half the freehold and each of the other two a quarter. On the site formerly occupied by a garden and office, they constructed, as extensions to the house, assembly rooms for concerts and public meetings. The main room on the first floor measured 79 by 32 feet (24.1 by 9.8 metres), with a height of between 22 and 28 feet (6.7 and 8.5 m): its vaulted ceilings had paintings by the decorative painter Giovanni Battista Cipriani; and Thomas Gainsborough, a friend of Bach and Abel, was commissioned to produce the transparent paintings on glass for the Rooms. In addition there was a small room off the North side of the main room and a larger room on the ground floor beneath it.

The concert hall there, where concerts started under Bach in February 1775, became one of the principal musical venues in London. For these concerts the convention was that "The Ladies' tickets are Black, and the Gentlemen's Red." An entry from April 1776 in the diary of Edward Piggot gives the following description of a concert:

April the 16th, 1776 Lord Fauconbery sent me a ticket for Bach and Abels Concert at the Assembly room in Hanover Square the performers were the two above mentioned, the second played a solo extremely well; the others were Giardini, who plays on the Violin supprising well is Cramer; Crosdill on the Violoncello plays exceeding well, Fischer on the hautboy the same, all Capital performers, Savoi, Grassi & several others sang; Signora Grassi has a supprising voice being a tenor, which is very singular and I think disagreeable. In all about 22 musicians; this concert is reckoned the best in the world, every thing executed with the greatest taste and exactness; a very fine room 115 feet long 40 broad; it was almost full, every body Dressed; very elegantly painted; between the acts they go in another room underneath where you have tea; it is by subscription; it begins at 8 and ends at 10 every thing is elegant.

In November 1776 Gallini bought out the shares of his partners to become the sole owner of the freehold. Bach and Abel, continuing the tradition of subscription concerts they had started together in 1763, carried on organising festinos in the Rooms until 1783, when Gallini's father-in-law Lord Abingdon withdrew his financial support. Until his imprisonment in 1795 for libellous statements concerning a "pettifogging lawyer" who had allegedly cheated him, Lord Abingdon switched his allegiance to the rival orchestra in the Pantheon. From 1783 to 1793 programming was arranged by the violinist Wilhelm Cramer who led the group "The Professional Concerts", advertised as founded by "eminent professors of music, many years resident in London." The Rooms enjoyed royal patronage from 1785 to 1793, with George III and Queen Charlotte frequent concert-goers. The King even had a room set aside as the "Queen's Tea Room," to which he donated a large gilt mirror for the mantelpiece. In 1776 parallel series of concerts was started in the Rooms by the violinist and impresario Johann Peter Salomon. The Rooms were used by the Concert of Ancient Music from 1804 onwards; for the annual benefit performance of Handel's Messiah for the Royal Society of Musicians from 1785 to 1848; from 1833 onwards by the Philharmonic Society, established in 1813 under patronage of the Prince Regent; and, from 1848 until its dissolution in 1861, by the Amateur Musical Society, a choral society founded by Henry David Leslie in 1847. The estrangement in 1813 between the Prince Regent and Beau Brummell is reported to have taken place at a fancy dress ball in these Rooms, where Brummell, on not being recognized by the Prince, asked one of his companions in a stage whisper, "Alvanley, who's your fat friend?"

Over the years the Hanover Square Rooms were visited by many leading musicians and performers including Joseph Haydn (1791–1794), Johann Nepomuk Hummel (performances of Haydn piano sonata, 1791, and Mozart piano concerto, 1792) Harriet Wainwright (whose opera Comala premiered in 1792) Felix Mendelssohn (1842, first performance of Scottish Symphony), Niccolò Paganini (performing to empty benches, to his chagrin, 1834), Franz Liszt (1840), Anton Rubinstein (1842), Joseph Joachim (performing the Beethoven violin concerto at the age of twelve under Mendelssohn's baton, 1844), Hector Berlioz (1848 and 1853), Clara Schumann (1856) and Jenny Lind (the "Swedish nightingale", performing with her husband the pianist Otto Goldschmidt, 1856). The concerts of Haydn, organised through lengthy negotiations with Salomon, featured the first nine of his so-called London symphonies, Nos. 93–101. In a diary entry from 1791, Charles Burney records:

This year was auspiciously begun, in the musical world, by the arrival in London of the illustrious Joseph Haydn . . . and on February 25, the first of Haydn's incomparable symphonies, which was composed for the concerts of Salomon, was performed. Haydn himself presided at the pianoforte: and the sight of that renowned composer so electrified the audience, as to excite an attention and pleasure superior to any that had ever, to my knowledge, been caused by instrumental music in England. All the slow movements were encored; which never before happened, I believe, in any country.

In 1856, after the fourth concert in which she had participated—programmed for five hours with organ arrangements of her husband Robert Schumann's music during the interval—Clara Schumann wrote, "This was really the ne plus ultra of a bad concert. I felt ashamed of myself among all this dreadful stuff." On the arrangement for organ of Schumann's piano duet Geburtstagmarsch from his 12 Klavierstücke, Op. 85, she wrote that it "was one of those incomprehensible things that could happen nowhere but in England."

The Hanover Square Rooms were also used for some of the first performances in England of J. S. Bach's instrumental and choral music during the English Bach revival. In the first two decades of the nineteenth century, Samuel Wesley performed his violin sonatas with Salamon and arrangements of his organ music for two players with Vincent Novello, sometimes with orchestral accompaniment; Mendelssohn performed a prelude and fugue on the organ in 1840 in a concert arranged by Prince Albert; and in 1854 William Sterndale Bennett, one of the founding members of the Bach Society five years previously, conducted the first English performance of the St. Matthew Passion.

Benefit balls for the Royal Academy of Music were held regularly in the Rooms and attended by the Royal Family. After the 1835 ball, Benjamin Disraeli wrote to his sister:

Nothing has been talked of more than the great fancy ball that came off last night, and exceeded in splendour anything ever known in London. My dress was very good, with some additions, such as a silken shirt with long sleeves, lent me by Henry Baillie. D'orsay, Henry Bulwer, myself, Massey Stanley, Talbot, Herbert, and Regina went in a party with the Chesterfields, Ansons, and Worcesters. We flattered ourselves that we were the most distinguished there. Lady Chesterfield was a sultana, and Mrs. Anson a Greek, with her own hair longer than the calf of her leg. She was the most brilliant in the room. Lady Burghesh, Lady Fitzroy Somerset, and Lady Sykes wore powder, the two first Louis XIV, the last a complete copy of a Sir Joshua. Lady Londonderry, as Cleopatra, was in a dress literally embroidered with emeralds and diamonds from top to toe. Mrs. Norton and Mrs. Blackwood beautiful Greeks; but the finest thing was at half-past two Lyndhurst gave a supper in George Street to eight of the supremest ton and beauty, and you can conceive of nothing more brilliant than his house illuminated with a banquet to a company fancifully dressed. The Duke of Wellington, who was at the ball, was too tired to come.

The Rooms were used for many different purposes apart from music and balls, including public meetings ranging from lectures on the Church of England to displays of crewel embroidery. There were also medical talks, including, on 1 March 1842, a lecture by the Scottish surgeon James Braid who gave one of the first public demonstrations of what he called neuro-hypnotism or "nervous sleep" by sending 18 members of the audience simultaneously into a trance.

In 1848, with both of Gallini's nieces no longer alive, the Rooms were acquired by the music publisher Robert Cocks. Hector Berlioz narrated a performing visit he made in 1853:

The day before yesterday I appeared again before the English public in the 4th concert of the Philharmonic Society of Hanover Square. It was risky. All the cohorts of the Classical School had turned up in force. The performance of Harold had astonishing verve and precision, and I could say the same about the Carnaval Romain. I received huge applause despite the fury of four or five intimate enemies who, I was told, were writhing in their corner. My new piece in an antique style (Le repos de la Sainte famille), delightfully sung by Gardoni, made an extraordinary impression, and had to be repeated. -- Hector Berlioz, 1 June 1853

From 1862 onwards, having been completely refurbished, the concert-hall was used by the Royal Academy of Music. The Rooms were used from 1868 to 1874 for meetings of the women's suffrage movement: in 1868, Emily Faithfull lectured on "The Claim of Woman"; in 1870 the second meeting of the recently formed London National Society for Women's Suffrage was held in the Rooms, presided over by Clementia Taylor (wife of the MP Peter Alfred Taylor) and addressed by Helen Taylor, Harriet Grote (wife of George Grote) and Millicent Fawcett; in 1873 a similar public meeting was addressed by Lady Anna Eliza Mary Gore-Langton (wife of the MP William Gore-Langton), and Eliza Sturge (niece of Joseph Sturge).

The last concert of the Royal Academy took place in 1874. The following year the property was sold and became the premises of the Hanover Square Club, which had already been holding committee meetings there since ownership passed to Cocks. The buildings were demolished in 1900.

== Gallery ==
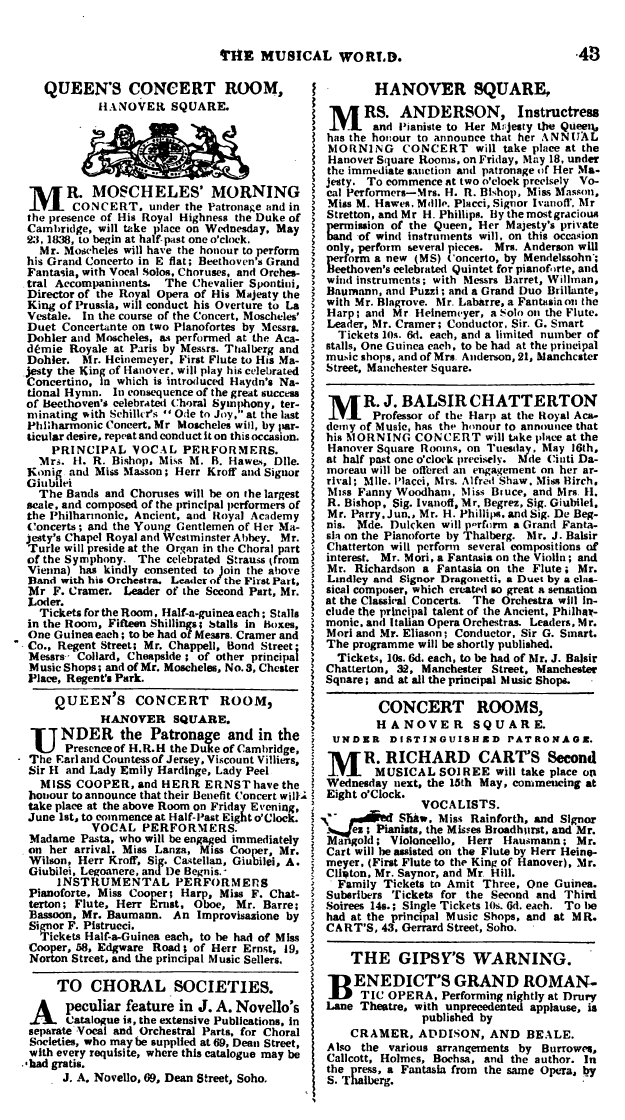
Announcement of concert with Johann Strauss in The Musical World, 1838

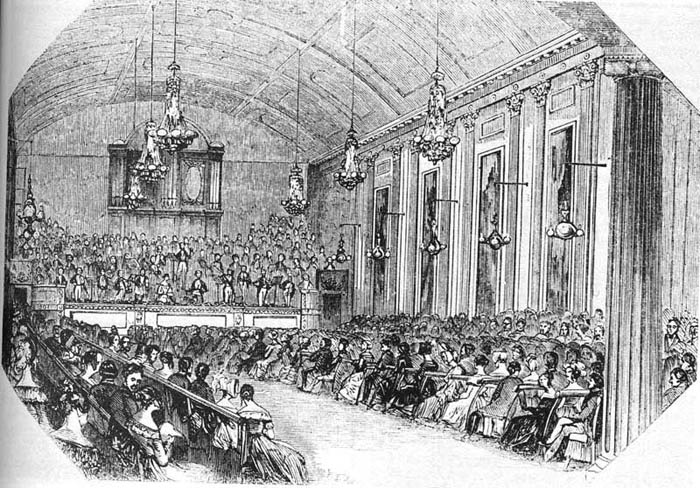
A concert, 1843

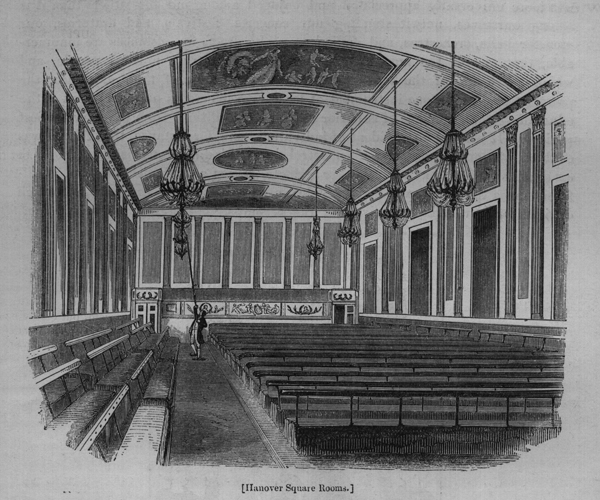
The concert hall, 1844

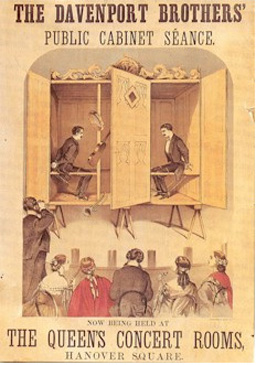
Poster for the Davenport Brothers, 1864

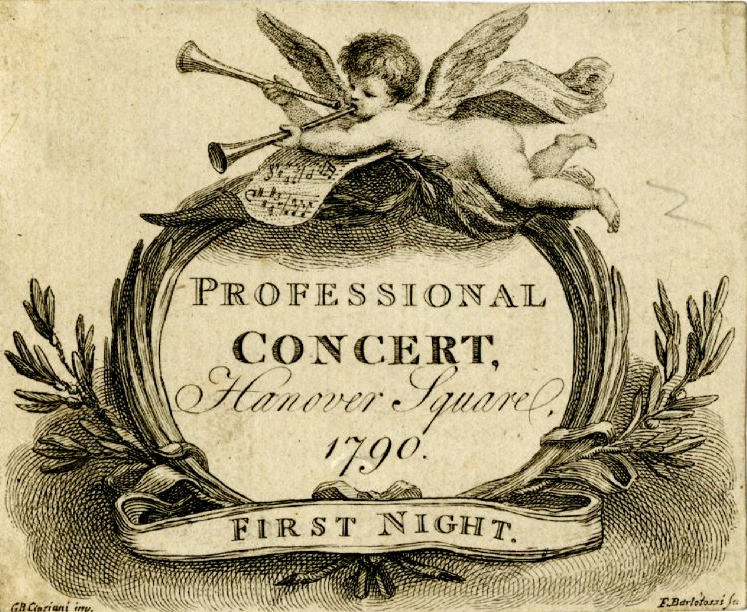
Lady's ticket, Francesco Bartolozzi

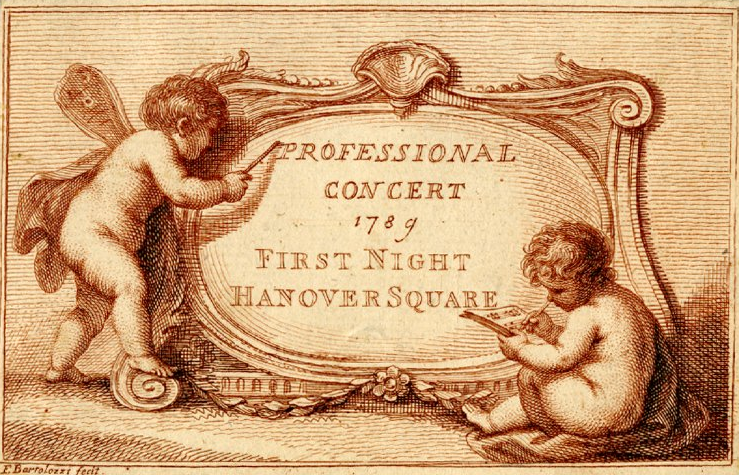
Gentleman's ticket, Francesco Bartolozzi

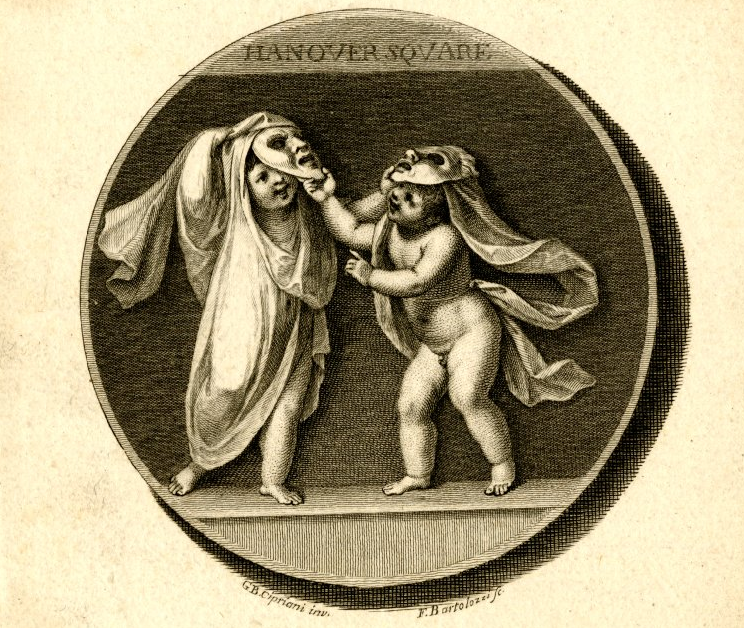
Lady's ticket, Francesco Bartolozzi

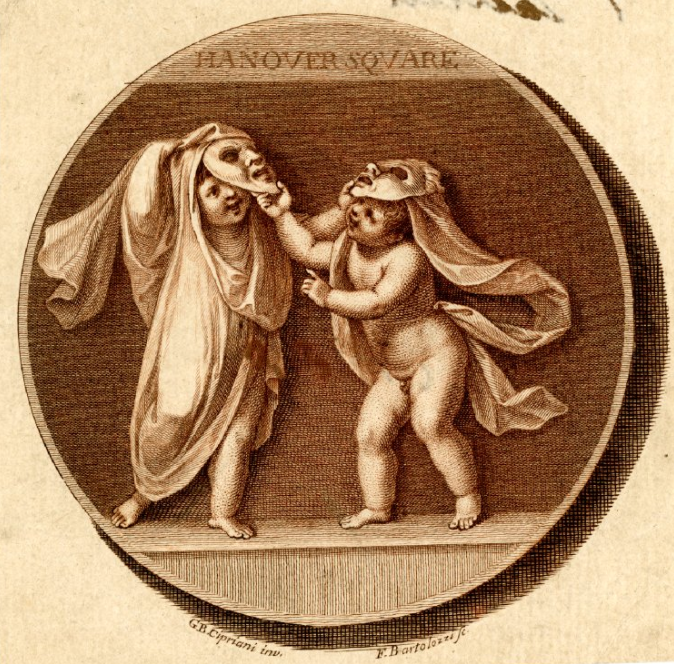
Gentleman's ticket, Francesco Bartolozzi

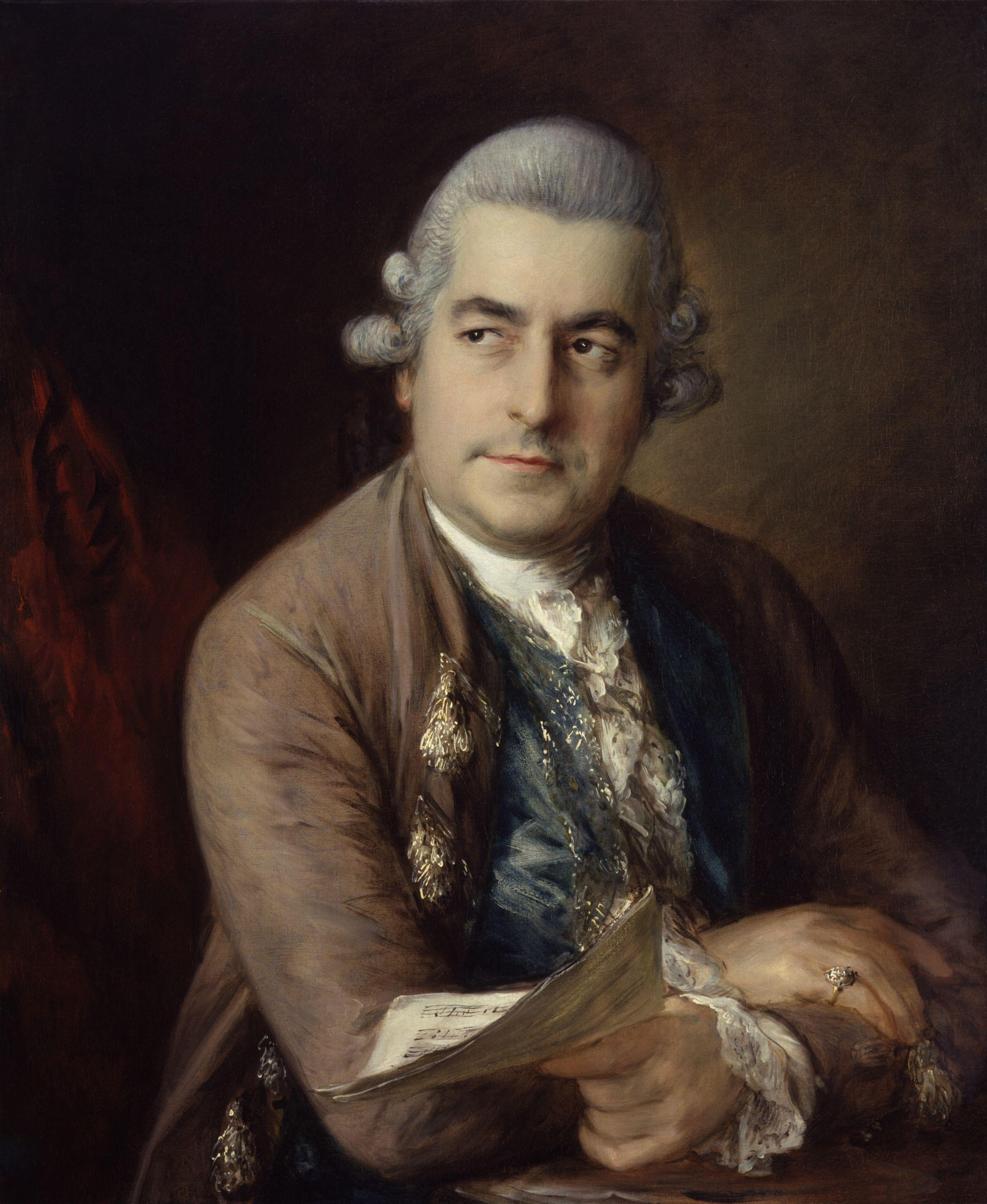
Portrait of Johann Christian Bach by Gainsborough

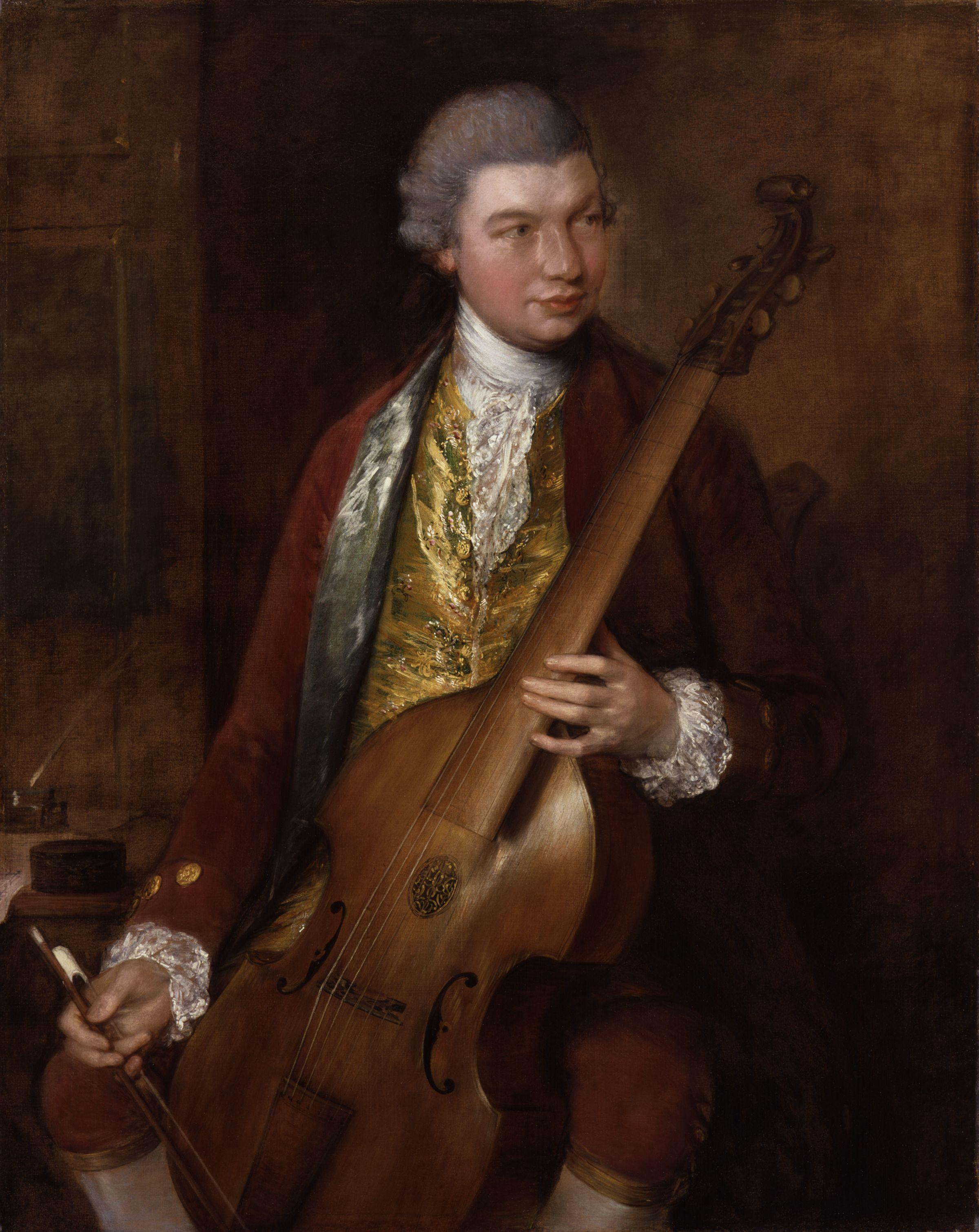
Carl Friedrich Abel by Gainsborough

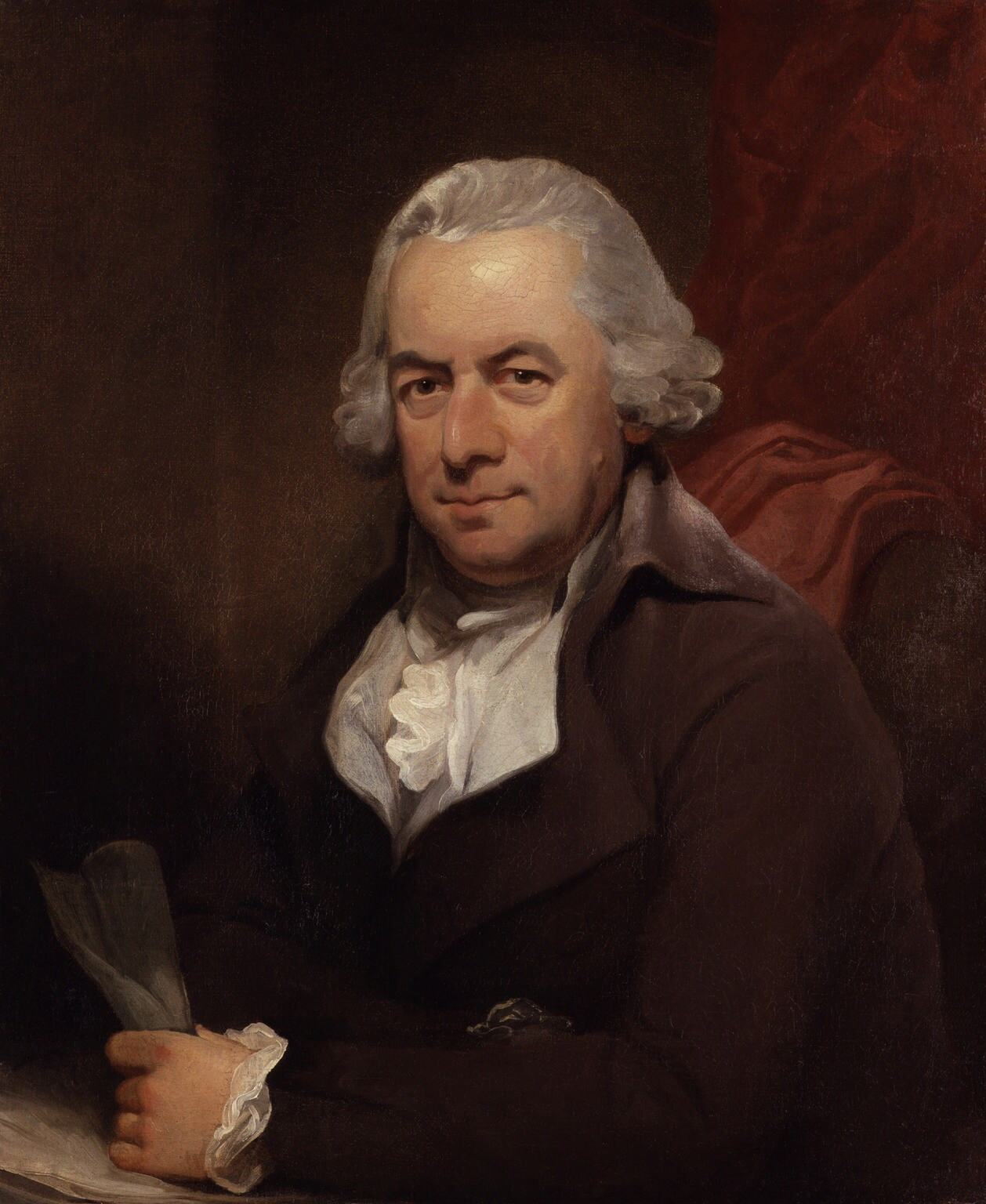
Wilhelm Cramer by Thomas Hardy

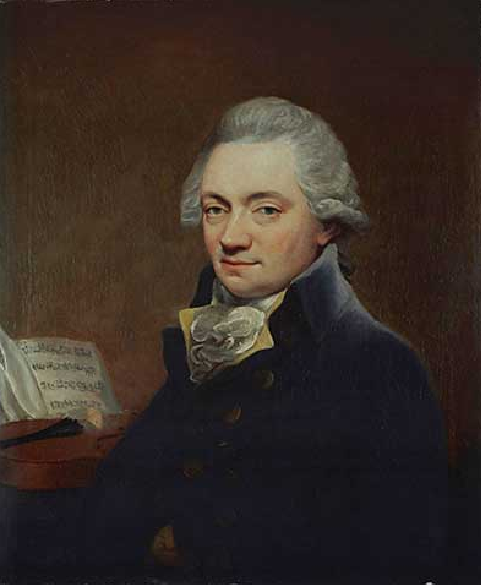
Johann Peter Salomon by Thomas Hardy
