= Gesellschaft der Associierten =

Association of music-enjoying aristocrats in Vienna, Austria

The Gesellschaft der Associierten was an association of music-loving noblemen centered in Vienna and founded by Baron Gottfried van Swieten in 1786. The society sponsored concerts, often reviving music from the past, and also commissioned new works.

== History ==
The founder, Gottfried van Swieten, had an extremely strong interest in music, particularly in the revival of music by great composers of the past such as J. S. Bach and Handel. However, van Swieten was himself only a baron, and was originally a commoner (his father, Gerhard van Swieten, had been the personal physician of Empress Maria Theresa and had been elevated to the nobility during Gottfried's own lifetime). Thus van Swieten lacked the vast wealth held by the older nobility, who possessed great landed estates in the hinterlands of the Empire. By recruiting a group of fellow music-lovers from the upper nobility, van Swieten was able to fund concert productions that would have been beyond his personal means.

There were, according to Theophil Antonicek, actually two organizations that bore this name. The original, founded in 1786, was called the "Gesellschaft der associierten Cavaliers", "Society of Associated Noblemen". This was dissolved in 1792, perhaps in conjunction with Baron van Swieten's fall from political power (he lost his principal positions on December 5, 1791, the day his protégé Mozart died). In 1799, the society was refounded with the curious name "Gesellschaft der Associierten" ("Society of the Associated"). For both the earlier and the later incarnations of the group, van Swieten served as "Secretär", secretary.

The organization's concerts were first given in one of the palaces of the members or in the large hall of the Imperial Library, then in a public performance in the Burgtheater or Jahn's Hall.

The Gesellschaft der Associierten endured until 1808, five years after van Swieten's death. The task of sponsoring concerts was soon taken up again by the Gesellschaft der Musikfreunde, founded 1812.

The name of the organization is translated in various ways into English, usually without distinguishing the two original versions. Timothy Bell renders it as "Society of Associated Cavaliers"; the translators of Deutsch (1965, 330) render it as "Society of Noblemen".

== Membership ==
The nobleman who took the most important role in Swieten's society was Prince Joseph Schwarzenberg, whose palace in central Vienna served as the venue for most of the society's productions. Schwarzenberg was a successful banker, and served the society as its business manager. He also made payments to Joseph Haydn above and beyond his obligations as a member of the society, and facilitated the handling of the large crowds that appeared at his palace for the concerts, in particular paying for sentry/police coverage as well as compensating the flour merchants for the business they lost due to the crush of people.

In his biography of Joseph Haydn (1810), Georg August Griesinger gave a list of the members, as follows.

- Princes
  - Liechtenstein
  - Esterházy
  - Schwarzenberg
  - Lobkowicz
  - Auersberg
  - Kinsky
  - Lichnowsky
  - Trautmannsdorf
  - Sinzendorf
- Counts
  - Czernin
  - Harrach
  - Erdödy; see also String Quartets, Op. 76 (Haydn)
  - Apponyi
  - Fries; see Violin Sonata No. 5 (Beethoven)

Haydn biographer Albert Christoph Dies, considered less reliable than Griesinger, adds a Count Marschall and a Baron von Spielmann. and omits various names given by Griesinger.

== Mozart ==
Wolfgang Amadeus Mozart took on the task of conducting the Gesellschaft's concerts in 1788. In addition to having him conduct, the Gesellschaft commissioned Mozart to prepare four works by Handel for performance according to contemporary taste:

- Acis and Galatea, performed in (approximately) November 1788 in Jahn's Hall.
- The oratorio Messiah, for which Mozart wrote new parts for flutes, clarinets, bassoons, horns, and trombones, as well as more notes for the timpani (1789).
- the Ode for St Cecilia’s Day (1790)
- Alexander’s Feast (1790)

The Gesellschaft's concerts were an important source of income for Mozart during this time, when he was experiencing severe financial worries.

== Haydn ==
The Gesellschaft sponsored the composition and premieres of Joseph Haydn's last three oratorios. These were his The Seven Last Words of Christ (1795–1796), an oratorio reworking of an earlier orchestral piece; The Creation (1798); and The Seasons (1801).

The Gesellschaft der Associierten provided financial guarantees needed for Haydn to undertake these long-term projects. They also awarded Haydn a substantial honorarium on completion of these works, and arranged for benefit performances from which the proceeds would be Haydn's. Dies (1810) reported that the Creation benefit yielded 9000 florins, a large sum, and that the Seasons benefit was "not so lucrative".
