= The Creation structure =

Structure of oratorio by Joseph Haydn

The Creation
- Oratorio by Joseph Haydn
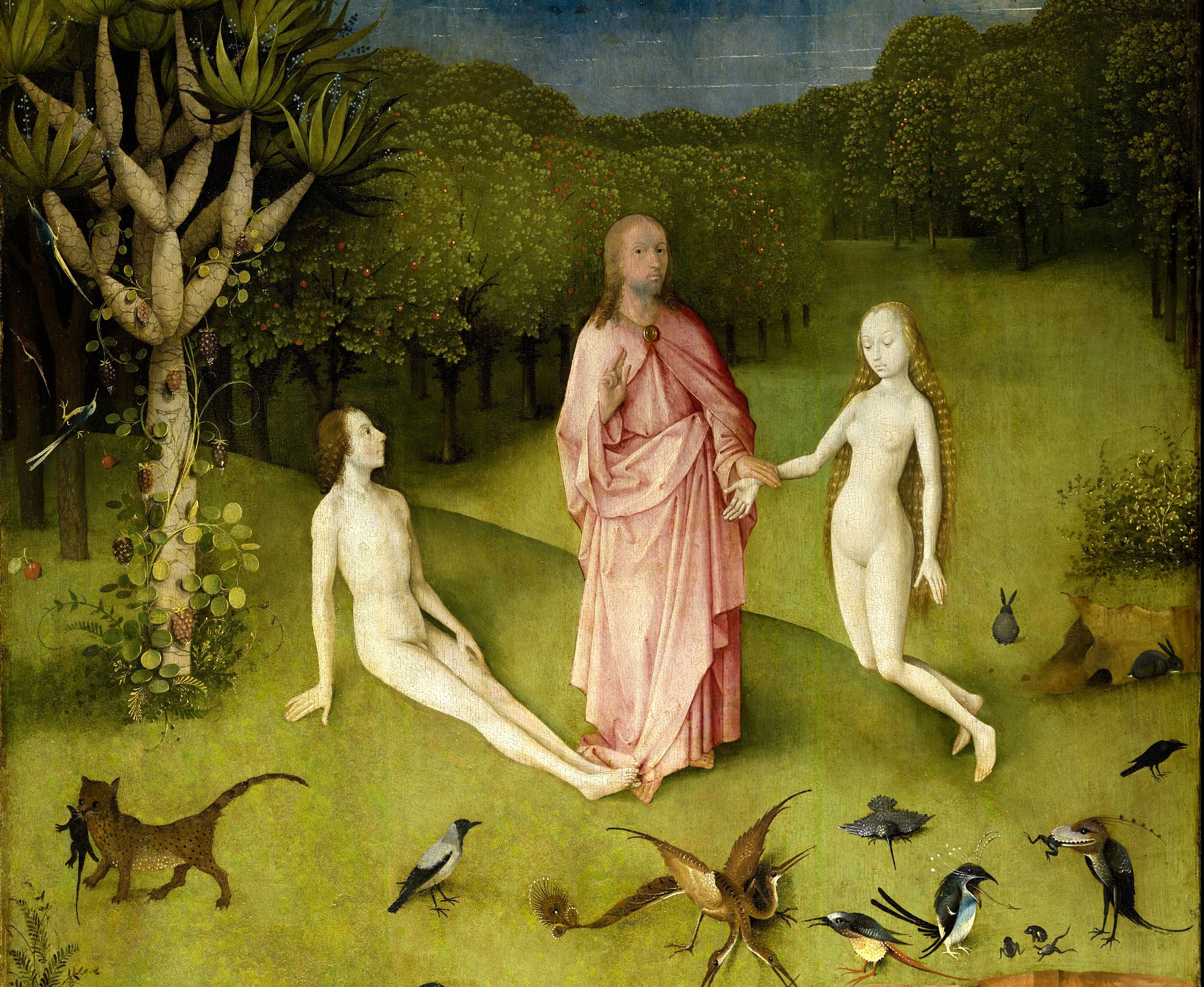
- Adam and Eve, topic of the oratorio's Part III, in The Garden of Earthly Delights by Hieronymus Bosch
- Native name: Die Schöpfung
- Text: Gottfried van Swieten
- Language: German
- Based on: Book of Genesis; Psalms; John Milton's Paradise Lost
- Composed: 1796–1798
- Movements: 34 (in three parts)
- Scoring: Soprano, tenor and bass soloists, chorus and orchestra

The Creation, the oratorio by Joseph Haydn, is structured in three parts. He composed it in 1796–1798 on German text as Die Schöpfung. The work is set for soloists, chorus and orchestra. Its movements are listed in tables for their form, voice, key, tempo marking, time signature and source.

== Libretto ==
The origin of the libretto is not known. Haydn received the booklet in English in London on his second extended stay in 1795 from his impresario Johann Peter Salomon. According to Haydn, it was passed by a certain Lidley, or perhaps Thomas Linley, and was attributed to him, but may be written by an unknown author. Back in Vienna, Haydn passed it to his friend and sponsor Baron Gottfried van Swieten, who translated and organized it.

The sources for the libretto are the two Creation narratives from the Book of Genesis, some Psalms, and John Milton's Paradise Lost, an epic poem in ten volumes, first published in 1667. The libretto is structured in three parts, the first dealing with the Creation of the universe and the plants, the second with the Creation of the animals, and of man and woman, and the third with Adam and Eve in Paradise, showing an idealized love in harmony with the "new world".

== Music ==
Haydn had composed symphonies, operas, string quartets and more chamber music for the court at Eszterháza. For the oratorio he used the vocal means of contemporary opera, recitative, aria, ensemble and chorus. The orchestra plays a decisive role in structure and tone painting.

The oratorio has five solo roles, in Part I and II the three archangels Gabriel (soprano), Uriel (tenor) and Raphael (bass), in Part III Adam (bass) and Eve (soprano). The final movement needs an additional alto soloist. The chorus is in four parts, SATB. Haydn used three soloists, some conductors prefer different soloists for Adam and Eve.

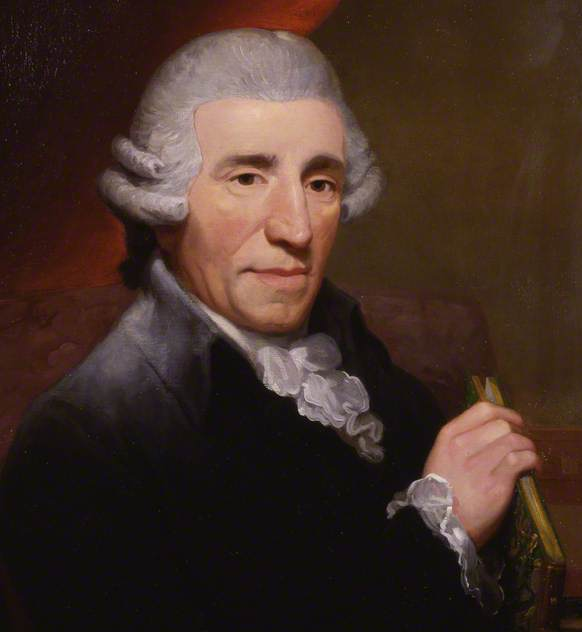
Joseph Haydn, portrait by Thomas Hardy, 1791

Haydn set most of the narration from the Genesis in secco recitative. The rendering of the words is simple, different for example from Bach's approach in the parts of the Evangelist in his Passions. Haydn exceptions are the two recitatives opening Part I and II, which are accompanied by the orchestra. For each day, the recitative is followed by a contemplation of it, typically in accompanied recitative and aria, and affirmed by a choral movement.

As Bach in his Christmas Oratorio and Handel in Messiah, Haydn saves the soprano voice for a late appearance. Whereas Bach and Handel reserve the high voice for the Annunciation to the shepherds, Haydn has Gabriel be the first to proclaim the wonder of the Wunderwerk (miraculous work).

Differently from Handel, who keeps solo and choral singing mostly separate in his operas and oratorios, Haydn strives for an interaction of solo and chorus, as in his late Masses and contemporary opera. In the conclusion of Part I, Die Himmel erzählen die Ehre Gottes (The heavens are telling the glory of God), which covers the first two verses of Psalm 19, the second verse, "To day that is coming speaks it the day ...", is given to the soloists, who sing to each other. This trio section is repeated, leading to a choral repetition of verse 1, the second time a bit faster (Più allegro) and concluded by an elaborate fugue, crafted on its second part, "and the firmament sheweth his handywork". In Vollendet ist das große Werk, the chorus frames a slow trio section by two different fast movements. In Von deiner Güt, o Herr und Gott (By thy goodness, O bounteous Lord), the soloists sing a duet, accompanied by triplets, while the choir with the timpani sings simultaneously, as a soft foundation in even rhythm speaking of eternity, Gesegnet sei des Herren Macht (Forever blessed be his pow'r).

The orchestra plays a distinct role in word painting. For example, flute and clarinet imitate the singing of the birds, trombones and contrabassoon articulate the roaring of the lion. When God speaks in person, "Seid fruchtbar" (be fruitful), the bass voice is accompanied by the low strings only. The solemn sound is reminiscent of the string quartet accompanying the Vox Christi (voice of Christ) in Bach's St Matthew Passion. The cellos have the melody speaking of human love, three flutes illustrate Paradise.

Richard Wigmore summarizes: "In our own sceptical and precarious age we can still delight, perhaps with a touch of nostalgia, in Haydn’s unsullied optimism, expressed in some of the most lovable and life-affirming music ever composed."

== Structure ==
The following tables are organized by a number and first line of the movements. Different numbering of the movement exists. The voices are sometimes abbreviated S for soprano, T for tenor, B for bass. The modulating keys of many recitatives are written in accidentals. Recitatives typically come without a tempo marking. If no source is given, the text is derived from Paradise Lost. The book of Genesis is abbreviated "Gen", the Book of Psalms "Ps". The English translations are taken from the edition of the Oxford University Press, 1991.

=== Part I ===
No.	Title	Form	Voice	Key	Tempo	Time	Source	Translation	Notes
	Die Vorstellung des Chaos			C minor	Largo	common time		The Representation of Chaos	
	Day 1								
1	Im Anfange schuf Gott Himmel und Erde	Recitative	Bass	C minor		common time	Gen 1:1–2	In the beginning God created Heaven and Earth	
	Und der Geist Gottes schwebte	Chorus					Gen 1:2–3	And the Spirit of God moved	(Note: suddenly forte in C major on "light")
	Und Gott sah das Licht	Recitative	Tenor	C major			Gen 1:4	And God saw the light	
2	Nun schwanden vor dem heiligen Strahle	Aria	Tenor	A major	Andante	common time		Now vanished by the holy beams	
	Erstarrt entflieht der Höllengeister Schar				Allegro moderato			Affrighted fled hell's spirits	
	Verzweiflung, Wut und Schrecken	Chorus, fugue						Desparing, cursing rage	
	Day 2								
3	Und Gott machte das Firmament	Recitative secco	Bass			common time	Gen 1:6–7	And God made the firmament	
4	Mit Staunen sieht das Wunderwerk	Solo with chorus	Soprano	C major	Allegro moderato	common time		The marv'lous work beholds amazed	
	Day 3								
5	Und Gott sprach: Es sammle sich das Wasser	Recitative secco	Bass			common time	Gen 1:9–10	And God said let the waters	
6	Rollend in schäumenden Wellen	Aria	Bass	D minor	Allegro assai	common time		Rolling in foaming billows	
7	Und Gott sprach: Es bringe die Erde Gras hervor	Recitative secco	Soprano			common time	Gen 1:11	And God said, Let all the earth bring forth grass	
8	Nun beut die Flur das frische Grün	Aria	Soprano	B♭ major	Andante	6/8		Now robed in cool refreshing green	
9	Und die himmlischen Heerscharen verkündigten den dritten Tag	Recitative secco	Tenor			common time		And the Heavenly host proclaimed the third day	
10	Stimmt an die Saiten	Chorus		D major	Vivace	common time		Awake the harp	
	Day 4								
11	Und Gott sprach: Es sei'n Lichter an der Feste des Himmels	Recitative secco	Tenor			common time	Gen 1:14–16	And God said : Let there be lights in the firmament of heaven	
12	In vollem Glanze steiget jetzt die Sonne strahlend auf	Recitative	Tenor	D major	Andante	common time		In splendour bright is rising now the sun	
	Mit leisem Gang und sanftem Schimmer				Piú Adagio	common time		With softer beams and milder light	
	Den ausgedehnten Himmelsraum				Piú Adagio	common time		The space immense of th'azure sky	
13	Die Himmel erzählen die Ehre Gottes	Chorus		C major	Allegro	common time	Ps 19:1	The heavens are telling the glory of God	
	Dem kommenden Tage sagt es der Tag	Trio	S B T				Ps 19:2	To day that is coming speaks it the day	
	Die Himmel erzählen ...	Chorus						The heavens are telling ...	
	Dem kommenden Tage ...	Trio	S B T					To day that is coming ...	
	Die Himmel erzählen ...	Chorus			Più allegro			The heavens are telling ...	
	Und seiner Hände Werk	Chorus, fugue					Ps 19:1	The wonder of his works	second part of Ps 19:1

=== Part II ===
No.	Title	Form	Voice	Key	Tempo	Time	Source	Translation	Notes
	Day 5								
14	Und Gott sprach: Es bringe das Wasser in der Fülle hervor	Recitative	Soprano		Allegro	common time	Gen 1:20	And God said : Let the waters bring forth in plenty	
15	Auf starkem Fittiche schwinget sich der Adler stolz	Aria	Soprano	F major	Moderato	common time		On mighty wings the eagle proudly soars aloft	
16	Und Gott schuf große Walfische	Recitative secco	Bass			common time	Gen 1:21–22	And God created great whales	
	Seid fruchtbar alle	Recitative			Poco Adagio			Be fruitful all	
17	Und die Engel rührten ihr' unsterblichen Harfen	Recitative secco	Bass			common time		And the angels struck their immortal harps	
18	In holder Anmut stehn	Trio	S T B	A major	Moderato	2/4		In fairest raiment	
19	Der Herr ist groß in seiner Macht	Trio and chorus	S T B		Vivace	common time		The Lord is great in his might	
	Day 6								
20	Es bringe die Erde hervor lebende Geschöpfe	Recitative secco	Bass			common time	Gen 1:24	And God said : Let earth bring forth the living creature	
20	Gleich öffnet sich der Erde Schoß	Recitative	Bass		Presto	common time		At once Earth opens her womb	(Note: various keys and tempo markings to illustrate different animals)
	Das zackig Haupt				Presto	6/8		The nimble stag	
	Auf grünen Matten				Andante	6/8		The cattle in herds	
	Wie Staub verbreitet sich				Andante	common time		Unnumbered as the sands	
	In langen Zügen				Adagio	common time		In long dimensions	
21	Nun scheint in vollem Glanze der Himmel	Aria	Bass	D major	Allegro maestoso	3/4		Now shines heaven in the brightest glory	
22	Und Gott schuf den Menschen	Recitative secco	Tenor			common time	Gen 1:27, Gen 2:7	And God created Man	
23	Mit Würd' und Hoheit angetan	Aria	Tenor	C major	Andante	common time		In native worth and honor clad	
24	Und Gott sah jedes Ding	Recitative secco	Bass			common time	Gen 1:31	And God saw every thing	
26	Vollendet ist das große Werk	Chorus		B♭ major	Vivace	common time		Fulfilled at last the great work	
27	Zu dir, o Herr, blickt alles auf	Trio	S T B	E♭ major	Poco Adagio	3/4	Ps 145:15–16	All look up to thee, O Lord	
28	Vollendet ist das große Werk	Chorus		B♭ major	Vivace	common time		Fulfilled at last the great work	
	Alles lobe seinen Namen	Chorus, fugue					Ps 148:13	Glory to his name forever	

=== Part III ===
No.	Title	Form	Voice	Key	Tempo	Time	Source	Translation	Notes
29	Aus Rosenwolken bricht	Recitative	Tenor	E major	Largo	3/4		In rosy mantle appears	
30	Von deiner Güt, o Herr und Gott / Gesegnet sei des Herren Macht	Duet with chorus	S B	C major	Adagio	common time		By thy goodness, O bounteous Lord / Forever blessed be his Pow'r	
	Der Sterne hellster / Macht kund auf eurer weiten Bahn	Duet with chorus	S B	F major	Allegretto	2/4		Of stars the fairest / Proclaim in your extended course	
	Heil dir, o Gott!	chorus						Hail, bounteous Lord!	
31	Nun ist die erste Pflicht erfüllt	Recitative	S B		Allegro	common time		Our first duty we have now performed	
32	Holde Gattin, dir zur Seite	Duet	S B	E♭ major	Adagio	3/4		Sweet companion, at thy side	
	Der tauende Morgen				Allegro	2/4		The dew dropping morn	
33	O glücklich Paar, und glücklich immerfort	Recitative secco	Tenor			common time		O happy pair, and ever happy henceforth	
34	Singt dem Herren alle Stimmen!	Chorus		B♭ major	Andante	common time		Sing the Lord, ye voices all	
	Des Herren Ruhm, er bleibt in Ewigkeit	Chorus (fugue) with soli	S A T B		Allegro	common time		The praise of the Lord will endure forever	

== Sources ==
- Die Schöpfung (Haydn): Scores at the International Music Score Library Project
- Die Schöpfung Libretto stanford.edu
