= Piano Concerto No. 27 (Mozart) =

1791 piano concerto by W. A. Mozart

- by W. A. Mozart
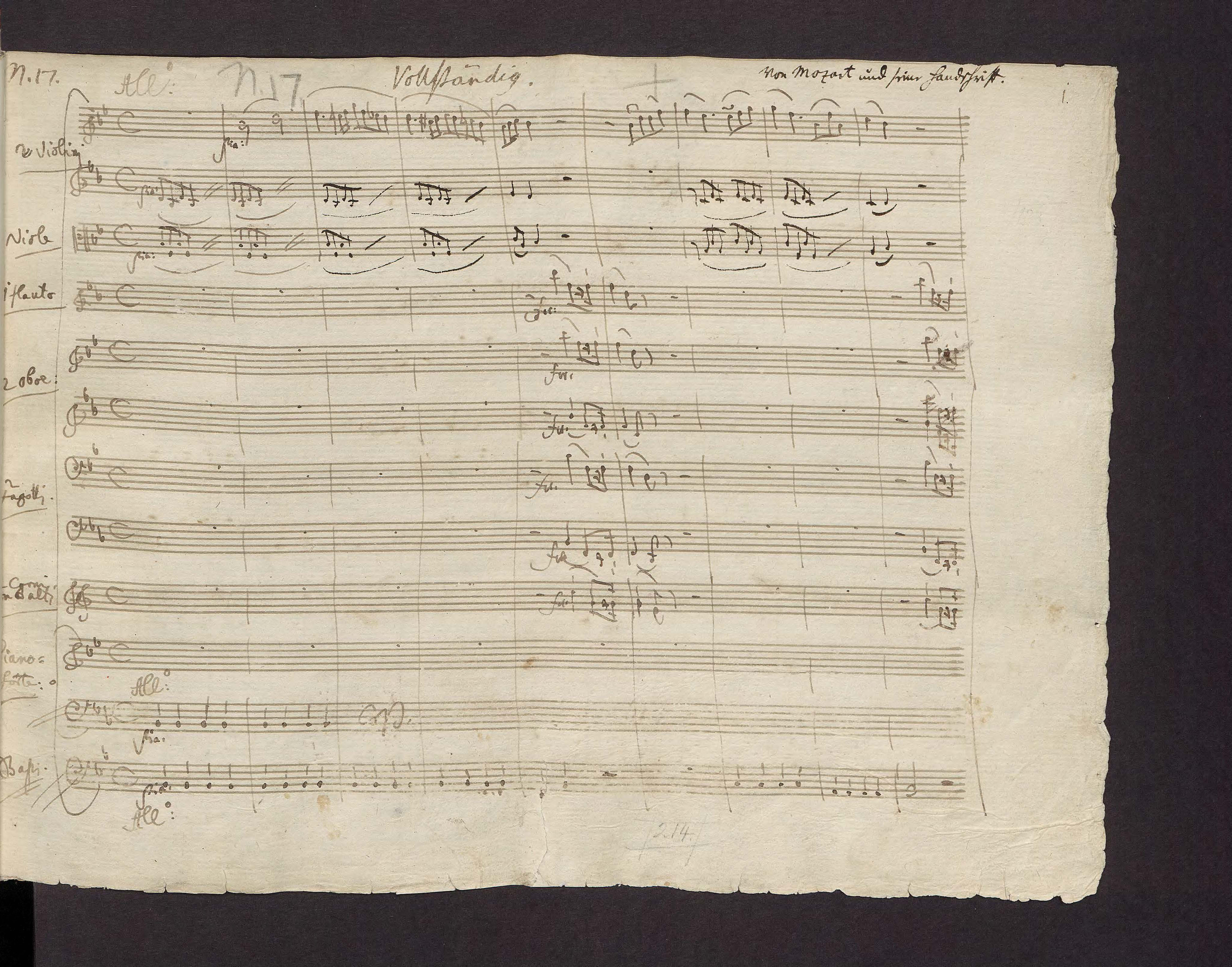
- Opening page of the autograph manuscript
- Key: B♭ major
- Catalogue: K. 595
- Genre: Piano concerto
- Style: Classical period
- Performed: 1791
- Movements: Allegro; Larghetto; Allegro
- Scoring: Piano; orchestra

The Piano Concerto No. 27 in B♭ major, K. 595, is Wolfgang Amadeus Mozart's last piano concerto; it was first performed early in 1791, the year of his death.

== History ==
The manuscript is dated 5 January 1791, but Alan Tyson's analysis of the paper on which Mozart wrote the work indicates that Mozart used the paper between December 1788 and February 1789, which implies composition well before 1791. Simon Keefe has written that the work dates to 1788. But according to Wolfgang Rehm, Mozart composed the concerto in late 1790 and early 1791. Cliff Eisen discussed the controversy over the composition date in his review of the published facsimile of the score.

== Premiere ==
The concerto may have been first performed at a concert on 4 March 1791 in Jahn's Hall by Mozart and the clarinetist Joseph Beer. If so, this was Mozart's last appearance in a public concert, as he fell ill later that year and died on 5 December 1791. Another possibility is that it was premiered by Mozart's pupil Barbara Ployer on the occasion of a public concert at the Palais Auersperg in January 1791.

Yet another possibility has been put forth by the Mozart scholar Wolf-Dieter Seiffert: that the work was not necessarily written for any particular performance venue, but rather for publication. The purchasing audience would have consisted largely of amateurs, intending to perform the concerto at home with a small group of friends. In support of this are three factors: the piano part is not that hard to play, the orchestra is modest in size, and Mozart included cadenzas and lead-ins, items that he himself would have improvised when performing. These traits are shared by the only other Mozart piano concertos published during his lifetime, namely K. 413–415.

== Music ==
I. Allegro

II. Larghetto

III. Allegro
Performed by Artur Schnabel and the London Symphony Orchestra, Sir John Barbirolli conducting

The work is scored for flute, two oboes, two bassoons, two horns in B♭, solo piano and strings, which makes it thinner than Mozart's other late concertos, all of which except for No. 23 have trumpet and timpani.

It has three movements:

1. Allegro
2. Larghetto in E♭ major
3. Allegro

Although all three movements are in a major key, minor keys are suggested, as is evident from the second theme of the first movement (in the dominant minor), as well as the presence of a remote minor key in the early development of that movement and of the tonic minor in the middle of the Larghetto.

The principal theme for the finale was also used in Mozart's song "Sehnsucht nach dem Frühling" (also called "Komm, lieber Mai, und mache"), K. 596, which immediately follows this concerto in the Köchel catalogue.

Mozart wrote down his cadenzas for the first and third movements.

Simon Keefe has discussed the concerto in detail, with emphasis on the distinctive character and experiments in style of the concerto compared to Mozart's other concerti in this genre.

According to Richard Wigmore, the work "holds serenity, melancholy and quiet radiance in elusive balance, inviting intimacy as much as display."
