= Gottfried van Swieten =

Dutch-Austrian diplomat and patron of composers (1733–1803)

Gottfried Freiherr van Swieten
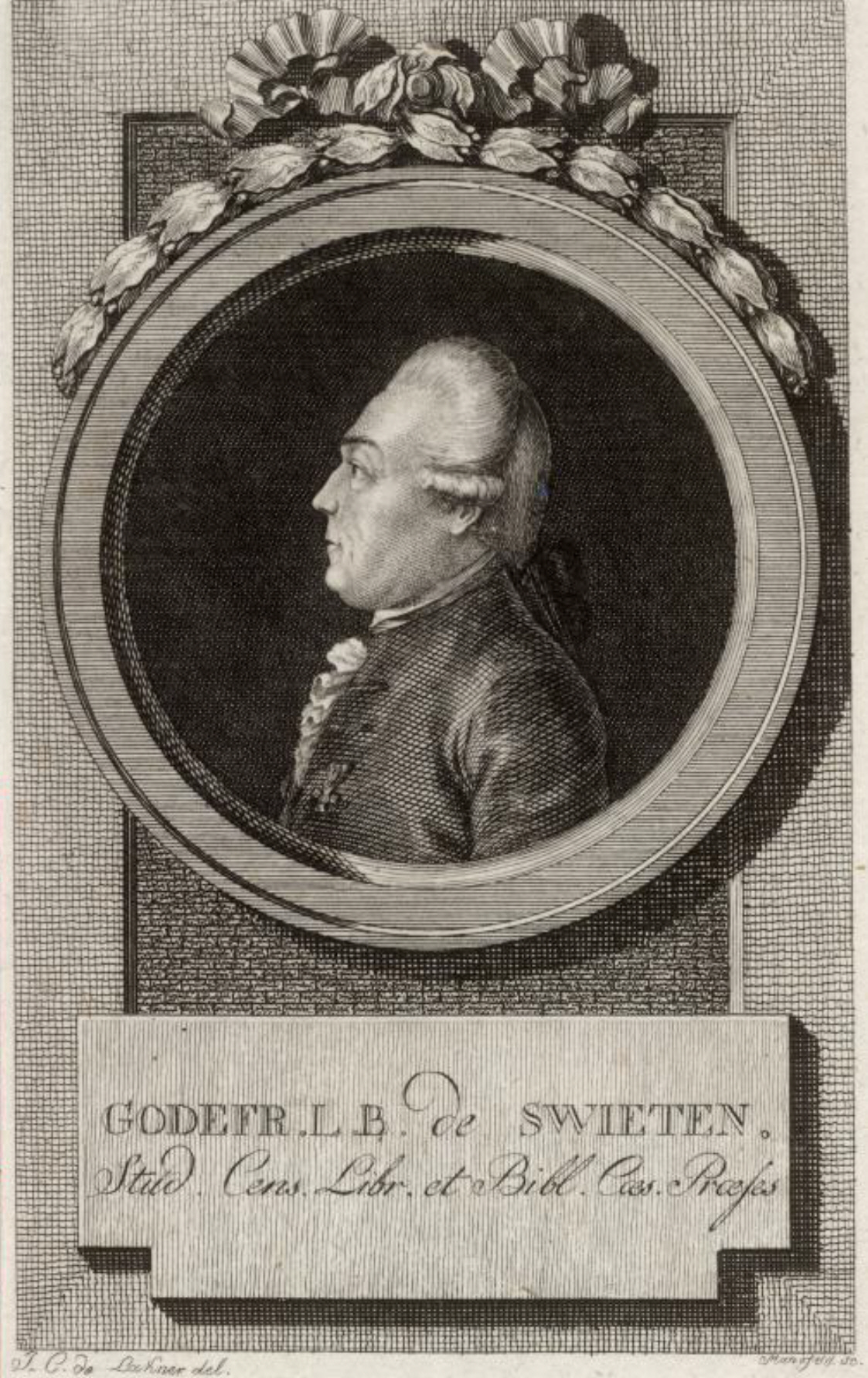
- Born: Godefridus Bernardus "Godfried" van Swieten; 29 October 1733; Leiden, County of Holland, Dutch Republic
- Died: 29 March 1803 (aged 69); Vienna, Habsburg Empire
- Education: Theresianum, a Jesuit school in Vienna
- Occupations: diplomat, librarian, official
- Father: Gerard van Swieten

Gottfried Freiherr van Swieten (29 October 1733 – 29 March 1803) was a Dutch-born diplomat, librarian, and government official who served the Holy Roman Empire during the 18th century. He was an enthusiastic amateur musician and is best remembered today as the patron of several great composers of the Classical era, including Carl Phillip Emanuel Bach, Joseph Haydn, Wolfgang Amadeus Mozart, and Ludwig van Beethoven.

== Life and career ==
Van Swieten was born Godefridus Bernardus "Godfried" van Swieten in Leiden and grew up in the Dutch Republic to the age of 11. His father, Gerard van Swieten, was a physician who achieved a high reputation for raising standards of scientific research and instruction in the field of medicine. In 1745, the elder van Swieten agreed to become personal physician to the Holy Roman Empress Maria Theresa and moved with his family to Vienna, where he also became the director of the court library and served in other government posts. The young van Swieten was educated for national service in an elite Jesuit school, the Theresianum.

=== As diplomat ===
According to Heartz, van Swieten had "excelled in his studies" and was fluent in many languages. Thus it was natural that he would pursue (following a brief stint in the civil service) a career as a diplomat. His first posting was to Brussels (1755–1757), then Paris (1760–1763), envoy in Warsaw (1763–1764) and ultimately (as ambassador) to the court of Frederick the Great of Prussia in Berlin (1770–77).

The last posting involved serious responsibility. Frederick had previously defeated Austria in the War of the Austrian Succession (1740–1748), seizing from her the territory of Silesia; and had successfully defended his conquest in the Seven Years' War (1756–1763). Van Swieten was ambassador during the First Partition of Poland (1772), in which much of the territory of this nation was annexed by the more powerful neighboring empires of Austria, Russia, and Prussia. Austria rather unrealistically wanted Silesia (and other territories) back as part of the terms of the partition. According to Abert, it was van Swieten's "thankless task" to negotiate on this basis; the 60-year-old Frederick replied to him: "That's the sort of suggestion you could make if I had gout in the brain, but I've only got it in my legs." Van Swieten shifted the negotiations to his backup plan and the Partition went forward with Silesia remaining Prussian.

During this period of his career van Swieten assiduously cultivated his musical interests. His supervisor in Brussels, Count Cobenzl, reported in 1756 that "music takes up the best part of his time". In Berlin, van Swieten studied with Johann Philipp Kirnberger, a former pupil of J. S. Bach, and was part of the musical circle of Princess Anna Amalia, where the music of Bach and Handel was played and admired.

=== As librarian ===
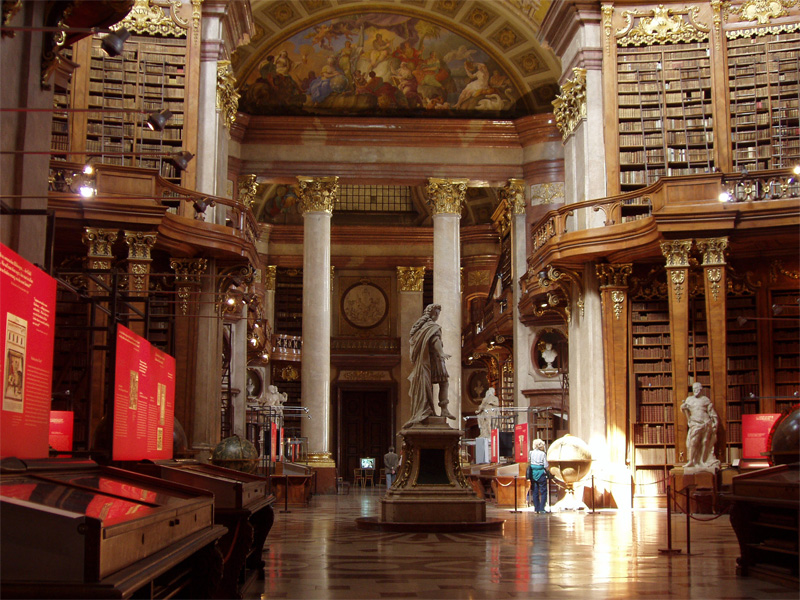
Prunksaal ("hall of splendor"), part of today's Austrian National Library, in the space of the former Imperial Library, of which van Swieten was head

On his return to Vienna in 1777, van Swieten was appointed as the prefect of the Imperial Library, a post which had been vacant for five years since his father's death. Van Swieten remained imperial librarian for the rest of his life.

As librarian van Swieten introduced the world's first card catalog (1780). Libraries had had catalogs before, in the form of bound volumes. Van Swieten's innovation of using cards permitted new entries to be freely added in a conveniently searchable order. Card catalogs were soon adopted elsewhere, notably in Revolutionary France.

Van Swieten also expanded the library's collection, notably with books on science, as well as older books from the libraries of monasteries that had been dissolved under the decrees of Emperor Joseph II.

=== In politics ===
In 1780, when Joseph II came to the throne, van Swieten's career reached its peak of success. He was appointed a Councillor of State and Director of the State Education Commission in 1781, then also as Director of a new Censorship Commission in 1782. Van Swieten was strongly sympathetic to the program of reforms which Joseph sought to impose on his empire, and his position in government was a critical one, considered by Braunbehrens (1990) to be the equivalent of being minister of culture.

Edward Olleson describes the political situation: "The projected reforms of the educational system ... were the most fundamental of all. Joseph's goal of building up a middle class with a political responsibility towards the State depended on great advances in elementary education, and on the universities. Van Swieten's liberal views fitted him to the task of implementing the Emperor's plans." Olleson adds that, because Joseph's reforms increased the freedom of the press, a "flood of pamphlets" was published critical of the Imperial government—thus increasing van Swieten's responsibilities in supervising the censorship apparatus of the government. His letters of the time report an extremely heavy workload.

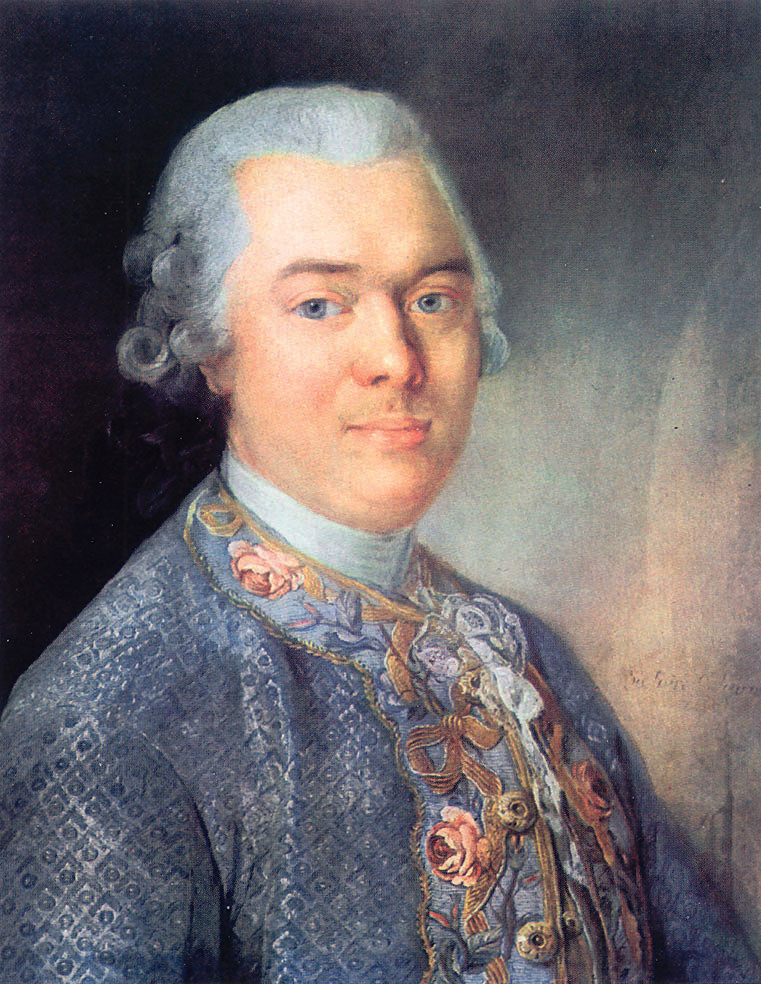
Van Swieten, c. 1790

In 1784 van Swieten proposed that the Holy Roman Empire should have a copyright law; such a law had already been in effect in England since 1709 (see: History of copyright). Van Swieten's suggestion was overruled by the Emperor. Nicholas Till suggests that had van Swieten's law been implemented, the career of his protégé Mozart as an independent musician might have gone much more successfully. Van Swieten's rise to power eventually met with obstacles and trouble. In 1787, the Emperor launched a "disastrous, futile, and costly" war against the Turks, which put Austrian society in turmoil and undermined his earlier efforts at reform. Till writes:

Joseph attempted to pass the blame for events on to ... van Swieten. As President of the Censorship Commission, [he] had been more liberal than Joseph was willing to countenance. ... As Minister for Education [he] had aimed to strip education of any religious character; he was more concerned about the dangers of religious orthodoxy than heresy, and believed that students should be taught a system of secular values based upon "philosophy". But his reforms, which indicated a far more radical rejection of religious education than Joseph was prepared to accept, had failed. In 1790, Joseph wrote to Chancellor Kolowrat expressing his discontent: "since an essential aspect of the education of young people, namely religion and morality, is treated far too lightly, since ... no feeling for one's true duties is being developed, the state is deprived of the essential advantages of having raised right-thinking and well-behaved citizens."

The Emperor was already terminally ill when he wrote the quoted letter, and died later that year. He was replaced by his more conservative brother Leopold, which further undermined van Swieten's position. A "bitter" (Olleson) power struggle took place which van Swieten ultimately lost. He was relieved of his commission post on 5 December 1791, coincidentally the day his protégé Mozart died.

=== As composer ===
Van Swieten's strong interest in music extended to the creation of his compositions. While in Paris he staged a comic opera of his own composition. He also composed other operas as well as symphonies. These works are not considered of high quality and are seldom if ever performed today. The Grove Dictionary opines that "the chief characteristics of [his] conservative, three-movement symphonies are tautology and paucity of invention ... As a composer van Swieten is insignificant."

Known works include three comic operas: Les talents à la mode, Colas, toujours Colas, and the lost La chercheuse d'esprit. He also wrote ten symphonies, of which seven survive.

=== Other ===
Van Swieten was well off financially, though by no means as wealthy as the great princes of the Empire. He had inherited money from his father, and he was also well paid for his government posts. Braunbehrens estimates his income as about "ten times Mozart's", which would make it (very roughly) 20,000 florins per year.

Van Swieten never married. His religion was Roman Catholicism, the state religion of the Austrian Empire.

Van Swieten owned what is now a very famous work of art, the Art of Painting by Vermeer, which he inherited from his father. At the time it was not known that the painting was by Vermeer.

=== Death ===
Van Swieten died in 1803 in Vienna.

== Relation to classical composers ==
The evidence suggests that van Swieten's relationship with the great composers of his day was primarily one of patronage. This means that the composers did not work for van Swieten on salary or commission, but received payments from him from time to time in the manner of a tip. Thus, Joseph Haydn remarked to his biographer Griesinger that "He patronized me occasionally with several ducats." This was a common way of paying musicians in the age of aristocracy; Haydn had received similar payments from his employer Nikolaus Esterházy, though he also drew a salary. The patronage system also financed the early travels of the Mozart family. (Note: For extensive discussion, including the many frustrations the patronage system posed for musicians, see Halliwell 1998.)

The relationship between patron and artist was not one of social equals. An 1801 letter of Haydn to van Swieten, by then his longtime collaborator, concludes as follows, suggesting the tone of their relationship: "Next week I shall have the pleasure of waiting on you. Meanwhile I remain, with profound respect, / Your Excellency's / most humble and obedient servant, / Joseph Haydn.

=== Mozart ===
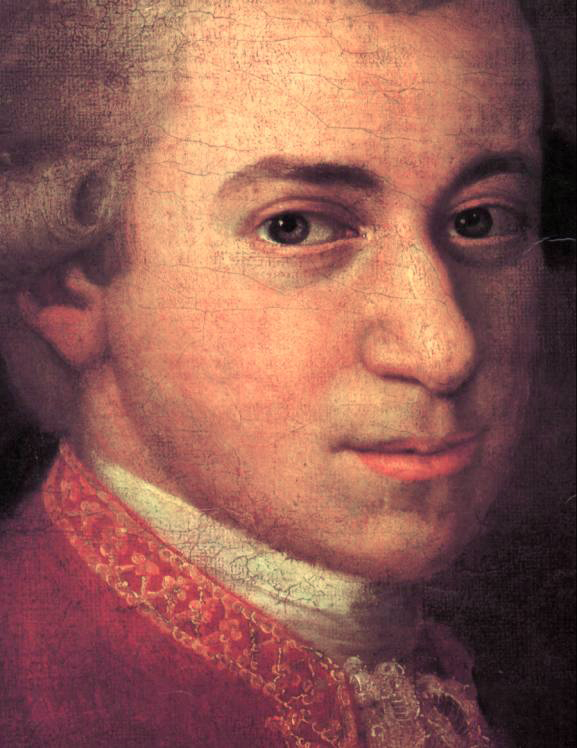
Mozart, about 1780. Detail of Mozart family portrait by Johann Nepomuk della Croce

Van Swieten first met Wolfgang Amadeus Mozart in 1768, when he was 35 years old and Mozart a boy of 11. The Mozart family was visiting Vienna, hoping to achieve further fame and income following the earlier completion of their Grand Tour of Europe. According to Mozart's father Leopold, van Swieten was involved in the early planning of Wolfgang's ill-fated opera La finta semplice (the opera was later blocked by intrigues, and could be performed only in Salzburg).

In 1781, shortly after Mozart had moved to Vienna, van Swieten met him again: at the salon of Countess Thun, Mozart played extracts from his recent opera Idomeneo, with van Swieten and other important officials in the audience; this event helped instigate Mozart's commission for the opera Die Entführung aus dem Serail, his first great success as a composer.

==== Sharing works by Bach and Handel ====
By 1782, van Swieten had invited Mozart to visit him regularly, in order to inspect and play his manuscripts of works by J. S. Bach and Handel, which he had collected during his diplomatic service in Berlin. (Note: Van Swieten's Berlin sources were students of Carl Philipp Emanuel Bach, who had worked in Berlin up to 1768 (Braunbehrens 1990, p. 318).) As Mozart wrote to his father Leopold (10 April 1782):

I go every Sunday at twelve o'clock to the Baron van Swieten, where nothing is played but Handel and Bach. I am collecting at the moment the fugues of Bach—not only of Sebastian, but also of Emanuel and Friedemann.

Others also attended these gatherings, and van Swieten gave Mozart the task of transcribing a number of fugues for instrumental ensembles so that they could be performed before the assembled company. Mozart also sat at the keyboard and rendered the orchestral scores of Handel's oratorios in a spontaneous keyboard reduction (while, according to Joseph Weigl, also singing one of the choral parts and correcting errors of the other singers). (Note: Abert 2007, p. 792 identifies the singers: van Swieten, descant (soprano line); Mozart, alto; Joseph Starzer, tenor; and Anton Teyber, bass.)

It appears that encountering the work of the two great Baroque masters had a very strong effect on Mozart. Olleson suggests that the process took place in two stages. Mozart responded first with rather direct imitations, writing fugues and suites in the style of his models. These works "have the character of studies in contrapuntal technique." Many were left incomplete, and even the completed ones are not often performed today; Olleson suggests they have "a dryness which is absent from most of [Mozart's] music." Later, Mozart assimilated Bach and Handel's music more fully into his style, where it played a role in the creation of some of his most widely admired works. Of these, Olleson mentions the C minor Mass (1783) and the chorale prelude sung by the two armored men in The Magic Flute (1791).

==== The Society of Associated Cavaliers ====
The keyboard-accompanied, one-on-a-part performances of Handel oratorios in van Swieten's rooms whetted the interest of van Swieten and his colleagues in full-scale performances of these works. To this end, in 1786 van Swieten organized the Gesellschaft der Associierten ("Society of Associated Cavaliers" or "Society of Noblemen"), an organization of music-loving nobles. With the financial backing of this group, he was able to stage full-scale performances of major works. Generally, these concerts were first given in van Swieten's private rooms in the Vienna Hofburg, then in a public performance in the Burgtheater or Jahn's Hall.

Mozart took on the task of conducting these concerts in 1788. He had previously been too busy with other tasks, but with a decline in his career prospects elsewhere he was willing to take up the post. In addition to having him conduct, the Gesellschaft commissioned Mozart to prepare four works by Handel for performance according to contemporary taste:

- Acis and Galatea, performed in (approximately) November 1788 in Jahn's Hall.
- the oratorio Der Messias after Messiah, for which Mozart wrote new parts for flutes, clarinets, bassoons, horns, and trombones, as well as more notes for the timpani (1789).
- the Ode for St Cecilia’s Day (1790)
- Alexander’s Feast (1790)

Van Swieten was responsible for the translations from English into German of the libretti for these works, a task he would perform later on for Haydn (see below).

The Gesellschaft's concerts were an important source of income for Mozart during this time when he was experiencing severe financial worries. Van Swieten's loyalty to Mozart at this time is also indicated by one of Mozart's letters of 1789, in which he reported that he had solicited subscriptions to a projected concert series (as he had previously done with great success in the mid-1780s) and found that—after two weeks—the Baron was still the only subscriber.

==== Mozart's death and aftermath ====
When Mozart died (1:00 am on 5 December 1791), van Swieten attended his home and made the funeral arrangements. He may have temporarily helped support the surviving Mozarts, as Constanze's correspondence in several places mentions his "generosity". On 2 January 1793, he sponsored a performance of Mozart's Requiem as a benefit concert for Constanze; it yielded a profit of 300 ducats, a substantial sum. He was also reported to have helped arrange for the education of Mozart's son Karl in Prague.

=== Haydn ===
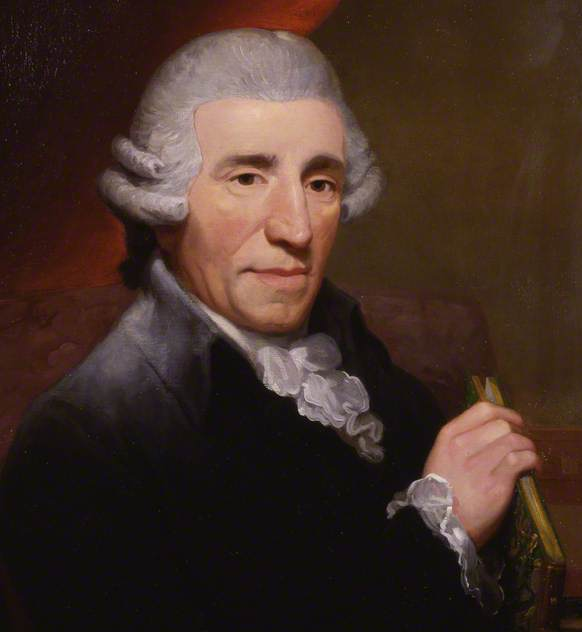
Joseph Haydn as portrayed by Thomas Hardy, 1792

In 1776, during a visit home to Vienna from his posting in Berlin, van Swieten offered encouragement to the 43-year-old Joseph Haydn, who at the time was vexed by the hostile reception his work was receiving from certain Berlin critics. Van Swieten told him that his works were nevertheless in high demand in Berlin. Haydn mentioned this appreciatively in his 1776 autobiographical sketch.

In 1790, with the death of Nikolaus Esterházy, Haydn became semi-independent of his long-time employers the Esterházy family. He moved to Vienna and thus became more free to accept van Swieten's patronage. Olleson suggests that Haydn participated in the Handel concerts of the Gesellschaft der Associierten, and notes that already in 1793, van Swieten was trying to get him to write an oratorio (to a text by Johann Baptist von Alxinger). In 1794, when Haydn set off for London on his second journey there, he rode in a carriage provided to him by van Swieten.

On his return the following year, Haydn and van Swieten developed a close working relationship, with van Swieten serving as his librettist and artistic adviser. The collaboration began in 1795/1796 with the small oratorio version of The Seven Last Words of Christ. This work was composed by Haydn as an orchestral piece in 1785. In the course of his second London journey, (Note: Sources differ in whether this occurred on the outbound or return journey (Larsen & Feder 1997, p. 67).) in Passau, he had heard a revised version amplified to include a chorus, prepared by the Passau Kapellmeister Joseph Friebert. Liking the idea, Haydn then prepared his own choral version, with van Swieten revising the lyrics used by Friebert.

Haydn and van Swieten then moved on to larger projects: the full-scale oratorios The Creation (1798) and The Seasons (1801). van Swieten translated (from English to German) and adapted the source material, which came from John Milton's poem Paradise Lost and James Thomson's poem The Seasons, respectively. He also translated in the reverse direction, putting the German back into English in a way that would fit the rhythm of Haydn's music. This reverse translation, though often awkward, enabled the first published editions of these oratorios to serve both German- and English-speaking audiences.

In the margins of his libretti, van Swieten made many specific artistic suggestions to Haydn about how various passages should be musically set, suggestions which in general Haydn "observed closely" (Olleson). One example is the moving episode in The Creation in which God tells the newly created beasts to be fruitful and multiply. Van Swieten's paraphrase of Genesis reads:

Seid fruchtbar alle,
Mehret euch!
Bewohner der Luft, vermehret euch, und singt auf jedem Aste!
Mehret euch, ihr Flutenbewohner
Und füllet jede Tiefe!
Seid fruchtbar, wachset, und mehret euch!
Erfreuet euch in eurem Gott!

Be fruitful all
And multiply.
Dwellers of the air, multiply and sing on every branch.
Multiply, ye dwellers of the tides,
And fill every deep.
Be fruitful, grow, multiply,
And rejoice in your God!

Haydn's musical setting stems from a suggestion of van Swieten's that the words should be sung by the bass soloist over an unadorned bass line. However, he only partly followed this suggestion, and after pondering, added to his bass line a rich layer of four-part harmony for divided cellos and violas, crucial to the final result. (Note: Of the passage, Rosemary Hughes writes (1970, 135), "Only a profoundly experienced, as well as profoundly inspired, musician could have endowed the recitative 'Be fruitful all' with the shrouded depth and richness suggested by its accompaniment of divided lower strings alone.")

The premieres of the three oratorios The Seven Last Words, The Creation and The Seasons all took place under the auspices of the Gesellschaft der Associierten, who also provided financial guarantees needed for Haydn to undertake long-term projects.

=== Beethoven ===
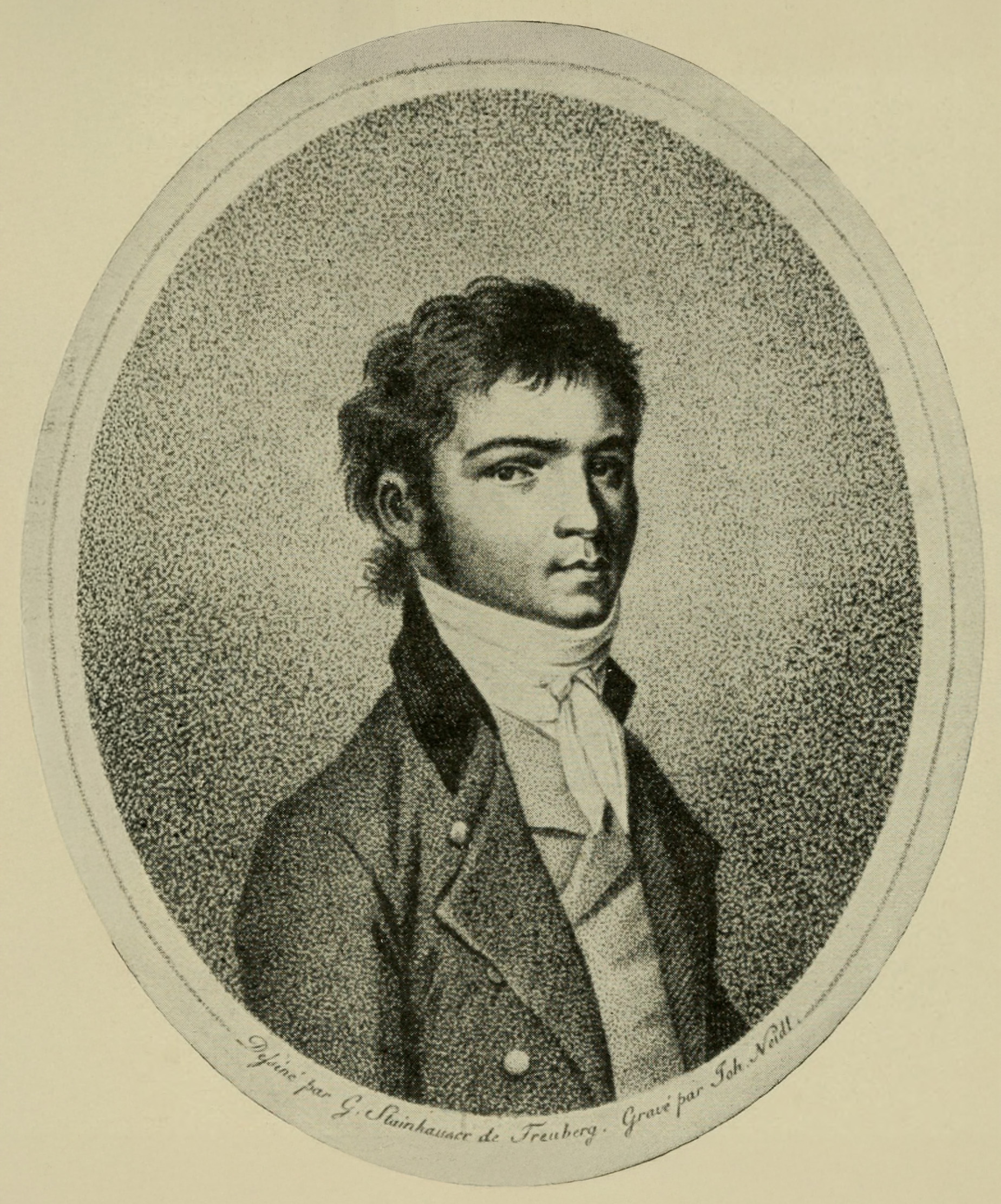
1801 engraving by Johann Joseph Neidl after a now-lost portrait by Gandolph Ernst Stainhauser von Treuberg, ca. 1800

Van Swieten was a patron and supporter of Ludwig van Beethoven during his early years in Vienna. Beethoven's experience with van Swieten was in some ways parallel to Mozart's about 12 years earlier. He visited the Baron in his home, where there were still regular gatherings centred around the music of Bach and Handel. Beethoven's early biographer Anton Schindler wrote:

The evening gatherings at Swieten's home had a marked effect on Beethoven, for it was here that he first became acquainted with the music of Handel and Bach. He generally had to stay long after the other guests had departed, for his elderly host was musically insatiable and would not let the young pianist go until he had 'blessed the evening' with several Bach fugues.

Schindler's testimony is not generally trusted by modern musicologists. (Note: See Anton Schindler § Subsequent discredit and recent attempts at revival of credibility) Indeed, Swieten's soirées were not Beethoven's first encounter with Bach's fugues. Beethoven's teacher, Christian Gottlob Neefe wrote in a letter promoting Beethoven's abilities: "a boy of eleven years ... plays chiefly The Well-Tempered Clavier of Sebastian Bach, which Herr Neefe put into his hands. Whoever knows this collection of preludes and fugues in all the keys – which might almost be called the non plus ultra of our art – will know what this means." However, in the case of Swieten's invitation there is concrete evidence preserved in the form of a letter from Swieten to Beethoven. The letter dates from 1794, when Beethoven was 23 years old:

Monday, 15 December
Herr Beethoven
Alstergasse (Note: Alstergasse is today Alser Straße) No. 15
c/o Prince Lichnowsky
If you are not hindered this coming Wednesday, I wish to see you at my home at 8:30 in the evening with your nightcap in your bag. Give me your immediate answer.
Swieten

Albrecht explains "nightcap" as follows: "This aspect of Swieten's invitation was as much practical and considerate as it was hospitable: if Beethoven had returned home after the citywide 9 p.m. curfew, he would have had to pay Lichnowsky's turnkey a fee to let him in the locked house doors."

Exposure to Bach and Handel's music seems to have been important to Beethoven just as it had been to Mozart. Ferdinand Ries later wrote, "Of all composers, Beethoven valued Mozart and Handel most highly, then [J.] S. Bach. ... Whenever I found him with music in his hands, or saw some lying on his desk, it was certain to be a composition by one of these idols."

In 1801, Beethoven dedicated his First Symphony to van Swieten.

=== Other associations ===
Earlier in his career, while in Berlin, van Swieten had also supported the career of Carl Philipp Emanuel Bach. Bach wrote the six Symphonies for String Orchestra (1773; H. 657–662) on commission from van Swieten; according to Goodwin and Clark, the commission specified that "the composer's creative imagination might have free rein, unfettered by any regard for technical difficulties". The third set of Bach's Sonaten für Kenner und Liebhaber (1781) is dedicated to van Swieten.

Johann Nikolaus Forkel, the first biographer of Bach, dedicated his book to van Swieten.

== Van Swieten and the social customs of music ==
Van Swieten is thought to have played a role in changing the social customs of music. As William Weber points out, in van Swieten's time, it was still the normal practice for performers to play mostly newly composed music; often music that had been written by the performers themselves. The practice of cultivating the music of previous decades and centuries only gradually increased. By about 1870, older works had come to dominate the scene.

This shift began in van Swieten's century. Some of the early cases of performers playing older music are pointed out by Weber: "In France the tragedies lyriques of Jean-Baptiste Lully and his successors were performed regularly up through the 1770s. In England music of the sixteenth century was revived in the Academy of Ancient Music, and many of the works of George Frideric Handel remained in performance after his death in 1759." As Weber notes, van Swieten was one of the pioneers of this trend, particularly in his work reviving the music of Bach and Handel, and in his encouragement of contemporary composers to learn from the old masters and create new work that would be inspired by them.

Van Swieten expressed some of his views about the value of earlier music in the pages of the first volume of the Allgemeine musikalische Zeitung:

I belong, as far as music is concerned, to a generation that considered it necessary to study an art form thoroughly and systematically before attempting to practice it. I find in such a conviction food for the spirit and for the heart, and I return to it for strength every time I am oppressed by new evidence of decadence in the arts. My principal comforters at such times are Handel and the Bachs and those few great men of our own day who, taking these as their masters, follow resolutely in the same quest for greatness and truth.

DeNora describes the devotion to earlier masters as a "fringe" view during the 1780s, but eventually others were following Swieten's lead, particularly with the success of The Creation and The Seasons. The music publisher Johann Ferdinand von Schönfeld wrote in 1796:

[Van Swieten is], as it were, looked upon as a patriarch of music. He has taste only for the great and exalted. ... When he attends a concert our semi-connoisseurs never take their eyes off him, seeking to read in his features, not always intelligible to everyone, what ought to be their opinion of the music. (Note: Schönfeld's words appeared in the Jahrbuch der Tonkünst von Wien und Prag (DeNora 1995, p. 25).)

A corollary of a "taste for the great and exalted" is the idea that concert audiences should maintain silence, so that each note can be heard by all. This was not the received view in the 18th century, (Note: See, for instance The Creation (Haydn). A 1781 letter of Mozart's reports the composer's pleasure that his playing had been interrupted by shouts of "bravo" (Waldoff 2006, p. 310).) but was clearly van Swieten's opinion. In his 1856 Mozart biography, Otto Jahn reported the following anecdote from Sigismund Neukomm:

[He] exerted all his influence in the cause of music, even for so subordinate an end as to enforce silence and attention during musical performances. Whenever a whispered conversation arose among the audience, his excellence would rise from his seat in the first row, draw himself up to his full majestic height, measure the offenders with a long, serious look and then very slowly resume his seat. The proceeding never failed of its effect.

== Assessment ==
Van Swieten has not fared well in assessments of his personal demeanor. In a frequently reprinted remark, Haydn remarked to Georg August Griesinger that van Swieten's symphonies were "as stiff as the man himself." He maintained a firm social distance between himself and the composers he patronized, a distance rooted in the system of aristocracy still in force in Austria in his day. Haydn's pupil and friend Sigismund Neukomm wrote that he was "not so much a friend as a very self-opinionated patron of Haydn and Mozart". Olleson suggests that "in his own time van Swieten won little affection" (adding: "but almost universal respect."). He also was not close to his fellow aristocrats; although his public roles in music and government were prominent, he avoided salon society, and after 1795 expressed content that he lived in "complete retirement".

Concerning van Swieten's contributions to music, posthumous judgment seems most critical of his role as librettist. Olleson observes that in the three successive oratorio libretti that van Swieten prepared for Haydn, his own involvement in the writing was greater for each than in the previous one. According to Olleson, "many critics would say that this progressive originality was disastrous".

Even van Swieten's musical taste has been harshly criticized, (Note: By Mozart biographer Hermann Abert, who suggests that Swieten's fondness for Baroque polyphony reflected a superficial, mechanical musical outlook (Abert 2007, p.).) but here the consensus is perhaps more positive. Van Swieten seems to have singled out for his favor—from among many composers whose reputation is now obscure—the composers that posterity has judged very highly. As Olleson notes, "One could scarcely quarrel with his choice of composers of the past, Sebastian Bach and Handel; and of those of his own time, Gluck, Emanuel Bach, Haydn, Mozart and Beethoven."

== In popular culture ==
Unlike his protégés Mozart and Beethoven, van Swieten is seldom portrayed in works of modern popular culture. He does appear as a supporting character in Peter Shaffer's 1979 play Amadeus and in Miloš Forman's 1984 film based on it, in which he was portrayed by actor Jonathan Moore.

== Notes and references ==
=== Sources ===
- Abert, Hermann (2007). W. A. Mozart. translated by Stewart Spencer with additions by Cliff Eisen. New Haven: Yale University Press. ISBN 978-0-300-07223-5.
- Albrecht, Theodore (1996). Letters to Beethoven and Other Correspondence. University of Nebraska Press. ISBN 978-0-8032-1033-2.
- Anon. (n.d.). "1780: The Oldest Card Catalogue". Austrian National Library. Archived from the original on 2 March 2022.
- Braunbehrens, Volkmar (1990). Mozart in Vienna. Translated by Timothy Bell. New York: Grove and Weidenfeld. Includes a chapter covering van Swieten and his times.
- Brück, Marion (2013). "Swieten, Gottfried Bernhard Freiherr von". Neue Deutsche Biographie (in German). Vol. 25. Berlin: Duncker & Humblot. pp. 731–732. (full text online).
- Clive, Peter (1993). Mozart and His Circle. New Haven: Yale University Press.
- Clive, Peter H. (2001). Beethoven and His World: A Biographical Dictionary. Oxford: Oxford University Press. ISBN 978-0-19-816672-6.
- DeNora, Tia (1995). Beethoven and the Construction of Genius: Musical Politics in Vienna, 1792–1803. Berkeley and Los Angeles; London, England: University of California Press. ISBN 978-0-520-21158-2.
- Deutsch, Otto Erich (1965). Mozart: A Documentary Biography. Stanford, California: Stanford University Press.
- Goodwin, Elliot H.; Clark, G. N., eds. (1976). The New Cambridge Modern History. Vol. VIII. The American and French Revolutions 1763–93. Cambridge University Press. ISBN 978-0-521-29108-8.
- Griesinger, Georg August (1810). Biographical Notes Concerning Joseph Haydn. Translated by Vernon Gotwals. Leipzig: Breitkopf und Härtel. In Haydn: Two Contemporary Portraits, Milwaukee: University of Wisconsin Press.
- Halliwell, Ruth (1998). The Mozart Family: Four Lives in a Social Context. Oxford: Oxford University Press. ISBN 0-19-816371-1.
- Heartz, Daniel (2008). Mozart, Haydn and Early Beethoven, 1781–1802. New York: W. W. Norton. ISBN 978-0-393-06634-0.
- Hughes, Rosemary (1970). Haydn. London: Dent.
- Keefe, Simon P. (2003). The Cambridge Companion to Mozart. Cambridge: Cambridge University Press. ISBN 978-0-521-00192-2.
- Kerman, Joseph; Tyson, Alan; Burnham, Scott G. (2001). "Ludwig van Beethoven". Oxford Music Online. doi:10.1093/gmo/9781561592630.article.40026.
- Larsen, Jens Peter; Feder, Georg (1997). The New Grove Haydn. W. W. Norton. ISBN 978-0-393-30359-9.
- Kramer, Richard (2008). Unfinished Music. Oxford: Oxford University Press. ISBN 978-0-19-532682-6.
- Olleson, Edward (23 April 1963). "Gottfried van Swieten: Patron of Haydn and Mozart". Proceedings of the Royal Musical Association. 89: 63–74. doi:10.1093/jrma/89.1.63. JSTOR 765997.
- Olleson, Edward (2001). "Swieten, Gottfried (Bernhard), Baron van". Grove Music Online (8th ed.). Oxford University Press. doi:10.1093/gmo/9781561592630.article.27216. ISBN 978-1-56159-263-0. (subscription, Wikilibrary access, or UK public library membership required)
- Petschar, Hans (n.d.). "History of the Austrian National Library: A multimedia Essay". Austrian National Library. Archived from the original on 14 January 2005.
- Robbins Landon, H. C. (1959). The Collected Correspondence and London Notebooks of Joseph Haydn. London: Barrie and Rockliff – via Internet Archive.
- Schindler, Anton (1996) [1860]. Beethoven As I Knew Him. Translated by Constance S. Jolly (3rd ed.). Courier Dover. ISBN 978-0-486-29232-8.
- Shaffer, Peter (2003). Amadeus. Samuel French. ISBN 978-0-573-60572-7.
- Solomon, Maynard (1995). Mozart: A Life. Harper Collins.
- Till, Nicholas (1995). Mozart and the Enlightenment: Truth, Virtue, and Beauty in Mozart's Operas. W. W. Norton. ISBN 978-0-393-31395-6.
- Tomita, Yo (August 2000). "Bach Reception in Pre-Classical Vienna: Baron van Swieten's Circle Edits the Well-Tempered Clavier". Music & Letters. 81 (3): 364–391. doi:10.1093/ml/81.3.364. JSTOR 854858.
- Waldoff, Jessica Pauline (2006). Recognition in Mozart's Operas. Oxford University Press. ISBN 0-19-515197-6.
- Weber, William (1984) "The Contemporaneity of Eighteenth-Century Musical Taste," The Musical Quarterly LXX(2):175–194.
- Webster, James (2005). "The sublime and the pastoral in The Creation and The Seasons". In Caryl Leslie Clark (ed.). The Cambridge Companion to Haydn. Cambridge: Cambridge University Press. ISBN 0-521-83347-7.
- Wheelock, Arthur K. Jr. (n.d.). "Johannes Vermeer: The Art of Painting – The Painting's Afterlife". with the assistance of Mari Griffith. Washington D.C.: National Gallery of Art. Archived from the original on 18 May 2016.
- Williams, Henry Smith (1907). The Historians' History of the World. The History Association.
