= The Creation (Haydn) =

Oratorio by Joseph Haydn

Die Schöpfung The Creation
- Oratorio by Joseph Haydn
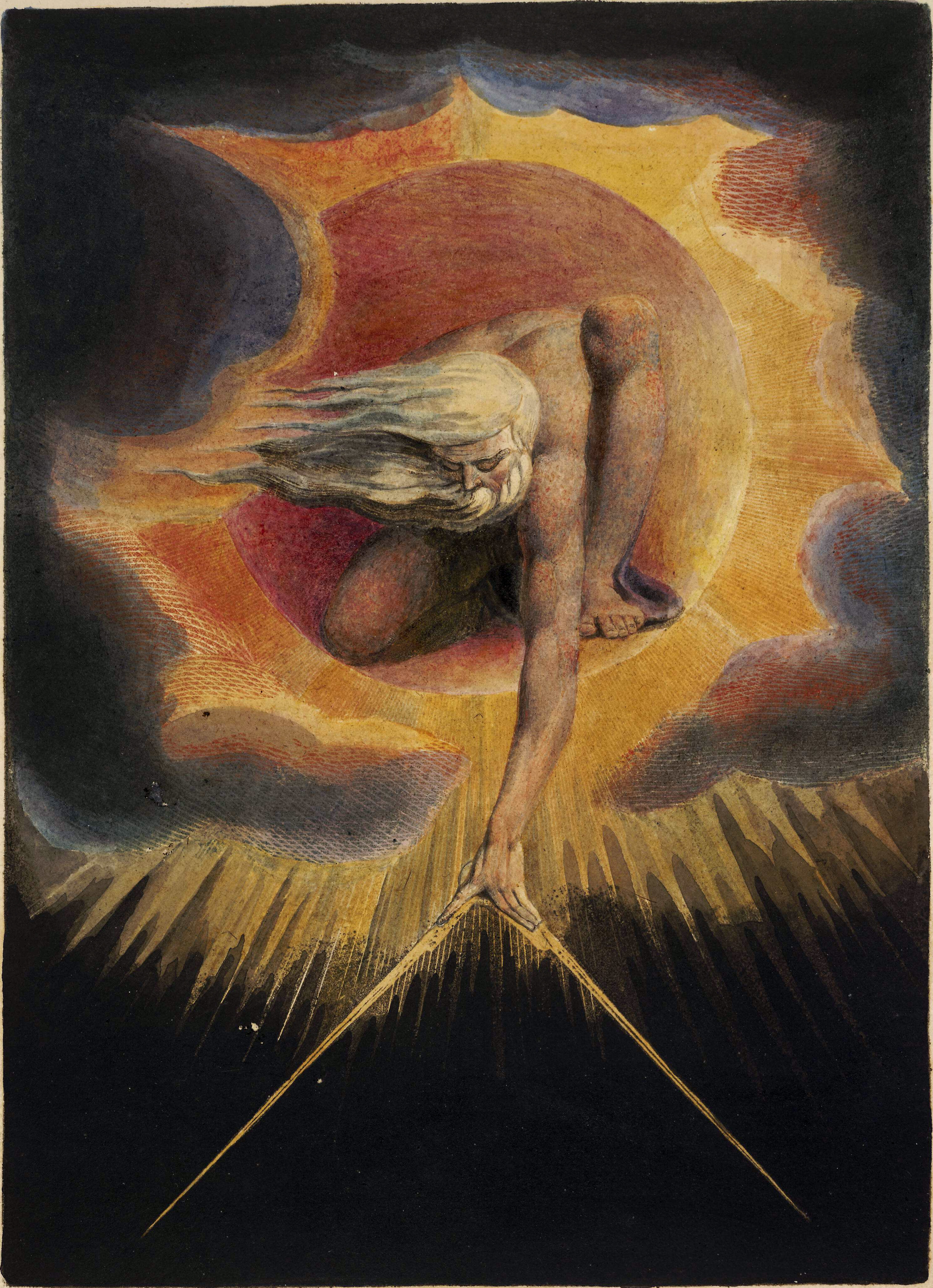
- From Europe a Prophecy, by William Blake
- Catalogue: Hob. XXI:2
- Text: Gottfried van Swieten
- Language: German
- Based on: Book of Genesis; Psalms; John Milton's Paradise Lost
- Composed: 1796–1798
- Scoring: soprano; tenor; bass; chorus; orchestra

The Creation (German: Die Schöpfung) is an oratorio written in 1797 and 1798 by Joseph Haydn (Hob. XXI:2), and considered by many to be his masterpiece. The oratorio depicts and celebrates the creation of the world as narrated in the Book of Genesis.

The libretto was prepared by Gottfried van Swieten. The work is structured in three parts and scored for soprano, tenor and bass soloists, chorus and a symphonic orchestra. In parts I and II, depicting the creation, the soloists represent the archangels Raphael (bass), Uriel (tenor) and Gabriel (soprano). In part III, the bass and soprano represent Adam and Eve.

The first public performance was held in Vienna at the old Burgtheater on 19 March 1799. The oratorio was published with the text in German and English in 1800.

== Inspiration ==
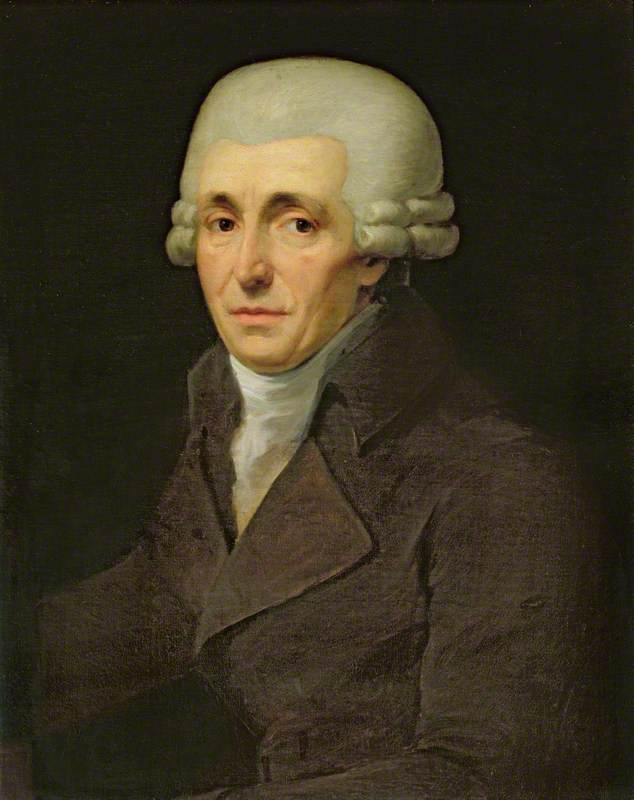
Portrait of Joseph Haydn by Johann Carl Rößler (1799)

Haydn was inspired to write a large oratorio during his visits to England in 1791–1792 and 1794–1795 when, alongside his close friend English music historian Charles Burney, he heard oratorios of George Frideric Handel performed by large forces. It is likely that Haydn wanted to try to achieve results of comparable weight, using the musical language of the mature classical style. Among the Handel works Haydn heard was Israel in Egypt, which includes various episodes of tone painting, perhaps an inspiration to Haydn's own pervasive use of this device in The Creation.

== Libretto ==
The text of The Creation has a long history. The three sources are Genesis, the Biblical book of Psalms, and John Milton's Paradise Lost. In 1795, when Haydn was leaving England, the impresario Johann Peter Salomon (1745–1815) who had arranged his concerts there handed him a new poem entitled The Creation of the World. This original had been offered to Handel, but the old master had not worked on it, as its wordiness meant that it would have been four hours in length when set to music. The libretto was probably passed on to Salomon by Thomas Linley Sr. (1733–1795), a Drury Lane oratorio concert director. Linley (sometimes called Lidley or Liddel) himself could have written this original English libretto, but scholarship by Edward Olleson, A. Peter Brown (who prepared a particularly fine "authentic" score) and H. C. Robbins Landon, tells us that the original writer remains anonymous.

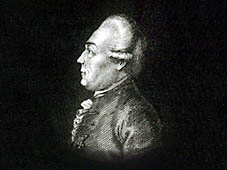
Portrait of the librettist Gottfried van Swieten, Austrian politician and librarian

When Haydn returned to Vienna, he turned this libretto over to Baron Gottfried van Swieten, who led a multifaceted career as diplomat, director of the Imperial Library, amateur musician, and patron of musicians including Mozart and Carl Philipp Emanuel Bach. He had already collaborated with Haydn as librettist, editing the text for the oratorio version of The Seven Last Words of Christ, premiered in Vienna in 1786. Swieten recast the English libretto of The Creation in a German translation (Die Schöpfung) that Haydn could use to compose. He also made suggestions to Haydn regarding the setting of individual numbers. The work was published bilingually (1800) and is still performed in both languages.

For the quotations from the Bible, Swieten chose to adhere very closely to the English King James Version. According to Nicholas Temperley, "the German text corresponds to no known German Bible translation. Instead, it is so constructed that the word order, syllabification, and stress patterns are as close as possible to the English. Haydn and Swieten must have realized that English audiences would not easily accept changes in the hallowed text of their Bible; and there were the formidable precedents of Messiah and Israel in Egypt to bear in mind."

In the final form of the oratorio, the text is structured as recitative passages of the text of Genesis, often set to minimal accompaniment, interspersed with choral and solo passages setting Swieten's original poetry to music. Swieten incorporated excerpts from Psalms for choral movements.

Van Swieten was evidently not a fully fluent speaker of English, and the metrically matched English version of the libretto suffers from awkward phrasing that fails to fit idiomatic English text onto Haydn's music. For example, one passage describing the freshly minted Adam's forehead ended up, "The large and arched front sublime/of wisdom deep declares the seat". Since publication, numerous attempts at improvement have been made, but many performances in English-speaking countries avoid the problem by performing the German version. The discussion below quotes the German text as representing van Swieten's best efforts, with fairly literal renderings of the German into English; for the full versions of both texts see the links at the end of this article.

== Premiere and reception history ==
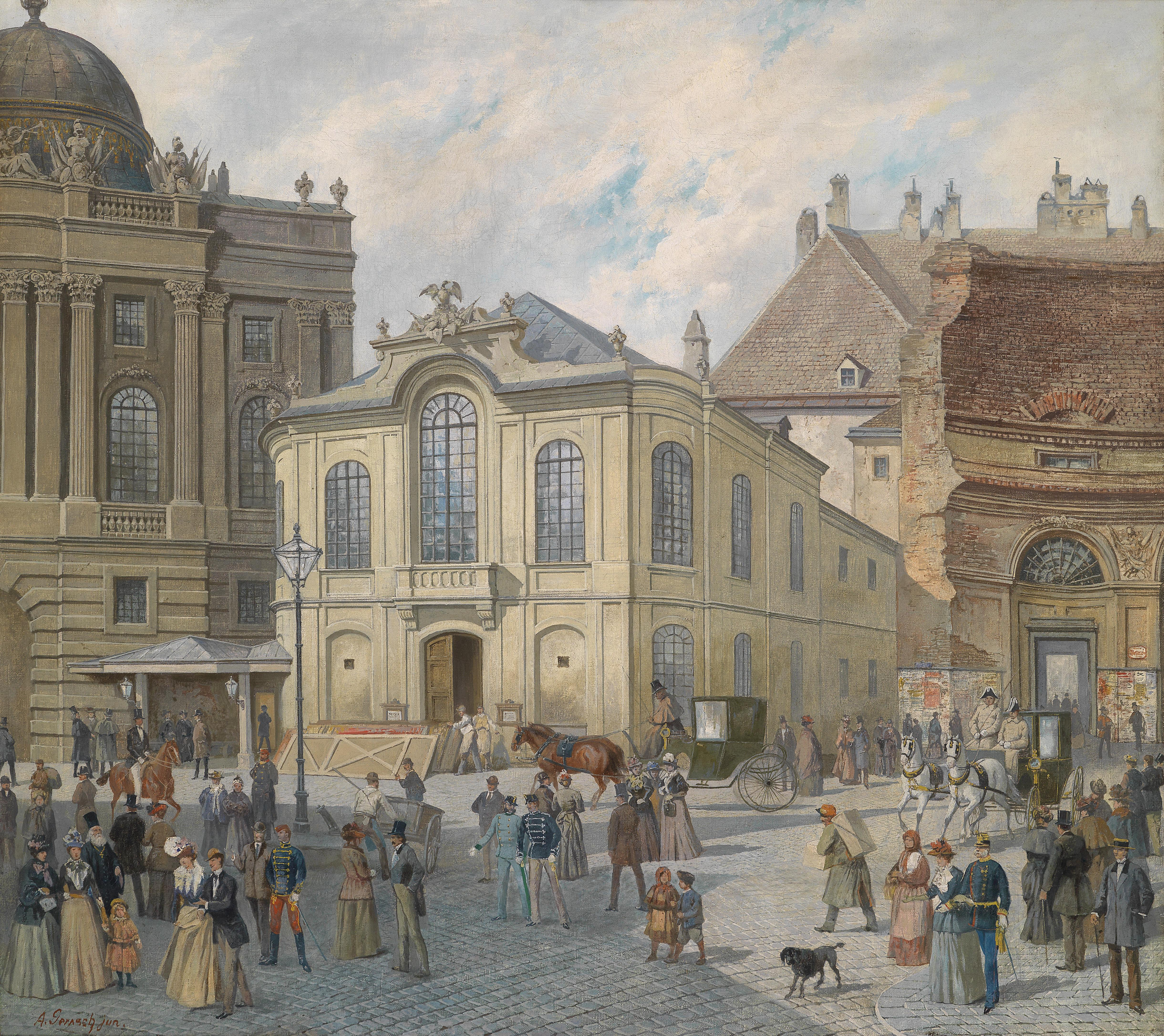
Old Burgtheater, site of the 1799 public premiere in Vienna

The first performances in 1798 were mounted by the Gesellschaft der Associierten, a group of music-loving noblemen organized by van Swieten to sponsor concerts of serious music; the Gesellschaft paid the composer handsomely for the right to stage the premiere (Salomon briefly threatened to sue, on grounds that the English libretto had been translated illegally). The performance was delayed until late April—the parts were not finished until Good Friday—but the completed work was rehearsed before a full audience on April 29.

The first performance the next day was a private affair, but hundreds of people crowded into the street around the old Schwarzenberg Palace at the New Market to hear this eagerly anticipated work. Admission was by invitation only. Those invited included wealthy patrons of the arts, high government officials, prominent composers and musicians, and a sprinkling of the nobility of several countries; the common folk, who would have to wait for later occasions to hear the new work, so crowded the streets near the palace that some 30 special police were needed to keep order. Many of those lucky enough to be inside wrote glowing accounts of the piece. In a letter to the Neue teutsche Merkur, one audience member wrote, "Already three days have passed since that happy evening, and it still sounds in my ears and heart, and my breast is constricted by many emotions even thinking of it."

The first public performance at Vienna's old Burgtheater at the Michaelerplatz on 19 March 1799 was sold out far in advance, and Die Schöpfung was performed nearly forty more times in the city during Haydn's life. The work became a favourite of the Tonkünstler-Societät, a charitable organization for the support of widows and orphans of musicians, for which Haydn frequently conducted the work, often with very large ensembles, throughout the remainder of his career. The Creation had its London premiere in 1800, using its English text, at Covent Garden. Napoleon, then the First Consul, was an avid admirer of the composer. He attended its Paris premiere on 24 December 1800; on the way there, he narrowly escaped a bomb intended to assassinate him.

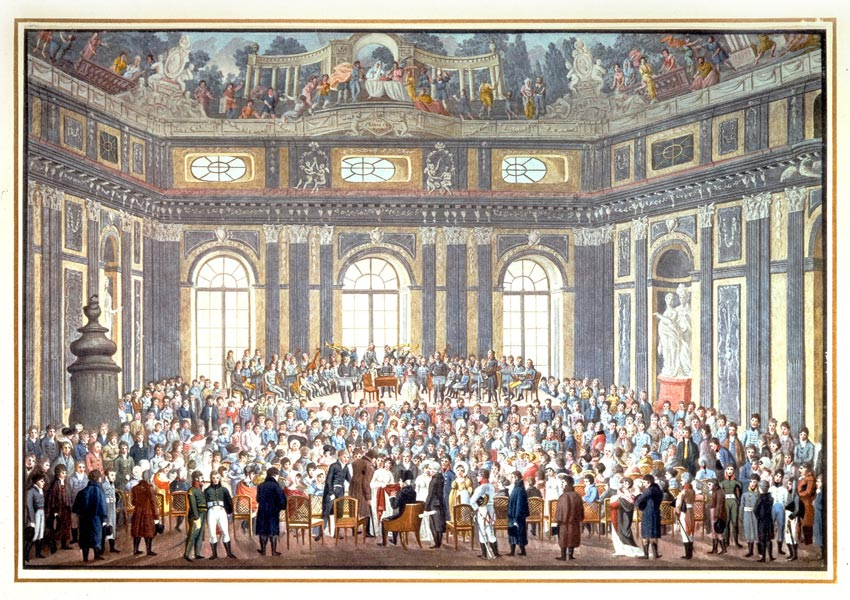
1808 performance of The Creation in honour of Haydn; reproduction of a stationery box lid painted in watercolours by Balthazar Wigand

The last performance Haydn attended was on March 27, 1808, just a year before he died: the aged and ill Haydn was carried in with great honour on an armchair. According to one account, the audience broke into spontaneous applause at the coming of "light" and Haydn, in a typical gesture, weakly pointed upwards and said: "Not from me—everything comes from up there!"

The Creation was also performed more than forty times outside Vienna during his life: elsewhere in Austria and Germany, throughout England, and in Switzerland, Italy, Sweden, Spain, Russia and the United States. Despite the eclipse in Haydn's reputation as a composer in the 19th and early 20th centuries, the work never left the repertoire during this time, and today it is frequently performed by both professional and amateur ensembles. There are many recordings.

== Music ==
=== Musical forces ===
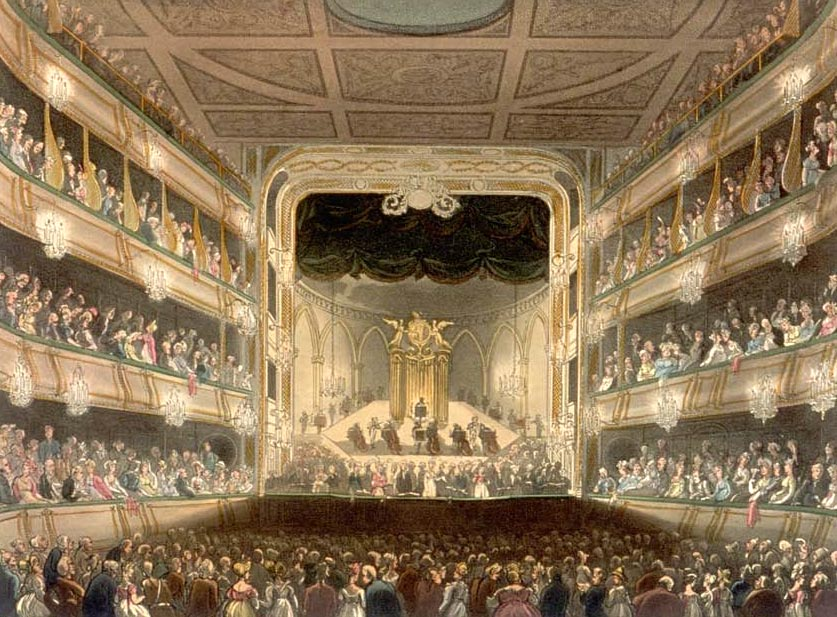
Old Covent Garden theatre, site of the English premiere in 1800; engraving from 1808

The oratorio is scored for three vocal soloists (soprano, tenor, and bass; there is also an incidental solo for alto in the finale), four-part chorus (soprano, alto, tenor, bass), and a large Classical orchestra consisting of the following:

- Flute I II (a third flute in no. 29)
- Oboe I II
- Clarinet I II (in C and B♭)
- Bassoon I II
- Contrabassoon
- Horn I II (in B♭ basso & alto, C, D, E♭, E, F, A)
- Trumpet I II (in D, C & B♭)
- Trombone I II III
- Timpani
- Violin I II
- Viola
- Violoncello
- Bass
- Continuo

There seems little doubt that Haydn wanted a big sound (by the standard of his day) for his work. Between the private premieres for nobles and the public premiere in 1799, Haydn added extra instrumental parts to the work. The forces for the public premiere numbered about 120 instrumentalists and 60 singers.

In Parts I and II of the work, the three soloists represent angels who narrate and comment on the successive six days of creation: Gabriel (soprano), Uriel (tenor), and Raphael (bass). Part III introduces as characters the first man and first woman of the Bible, Adam and Eve, during the time they spent in the Garden of Eden before the Fall. Adam, a bass role, is usually sung by the same soloist that sings Raphael, and the soprano role of Eve is usually sung by the same soloist who sings Gabriel. This was the practice Haydn followed, but some conductors prefer to cast each of the five roles with a different soloist.

The choral singers are employed in a series of monumental choruses, several of them celebrating the end of one particular day of creation.

The orchestra often plays alone, notably in the episodes of tone painting: the appearance of the Sun, the creation of various beasts, and above all in the overture, the famous depiction of the Chaos before the creation.

A typical performance lasts about one hour and 45 minutes.

=== Structure ===
The oratorio is structured in three parts. The first deals with the creation of light, of heaven and Earth, of the Sun and Moon, of the land and water, and of plants. The second treats the creation of the animals, and of man and woman. The final part describes Adam and Eve during their happy time in the Garden of Eden, portraying an idealized love in harmony with the "new world".

The oratorio is described below, for each part by both a table of the movements and description of individual movements. As in other oratorios, the larger musical numbers (arias and choruses) are often prefaced with a brief recitative; here, the recitative gives the actual words of Genesis, while the following number elaborates the bare Biblical narrative in verse. Choral movements are highlighted in a different background colour.

=== Part I ===
No.	Title	Form	Voice	Key	Tempo	Time	Source	Translation
	Die Vorstellung des Chaos			C minor	Largo	cut time		The Representation of Chaos
Day 1
1	Im Anfange schuf Gott Himmel und Erde	Recitative	Bass	C minor		common time	Gen 1:1–2	In the beginning God created Heaven and Earth
1	Und der Geist Gottes schwebte (Note: suddenly forte in C major on "light")	Chorus		C minor		common time	Gen 1:2–3	And the Spirit of God moved
1	Und Gott sah das Licht	Recitative	Tenor	C major		common time	Gen 1:4	And God saw the light
2	Nun schwanden vor dem heiligen Strahle	Aria	Tenor	A major	Andante	cut time		Now vanished by the holy beams
2	Erstarrt entflieht der Höllengeister Schar		Tenor	A major	Allegro moderato	cut time		Affrighted fled hell's spirits
2	Verzweiflung, Wut und Schrecken	Chorus, fugue		A major	Allegro moderato	cut time		Desparing, cursing rage
Day 2
3	Und Gott machte das Firmament	Recitative secco	Bass			common time	Gen 1:6–7	And God made the firmament
4	Mit Staunen sieht das Wunderwerk	Solo with chorus	Soprano	C major	Allegro moderato	common time		The marv'lous work beholds amazed
Day 3
5	Und Gott sprach: Es sammle sich das Wasser	Recitative secco	Bass			common time	Gen 1:9–10	And God said let the waters
6	Rollend in schäumenden Wellen	Aria	Bass	D minor	Allegro assai	common time		Rolling in foaming billows
7	Und Gott sprach: Es bringe die Erde Gras hervor	Recitative secco	Soprano			common time	Gen 1:11	And God said, Let all the earth bring forth grass
8	Nun beut die Flur das frische Grün	Aria	Soprano	B♭ major	Andante	6/8		With verdure clad the fields appear delightful
9	Und die himmlischen Heerscharen verkündigten den dritten Tag	Recitative secco	Tenor			common time		And the Heavenly host proclaimed the third day
10	Stimmt an die Saiten	Chorus		D major	Vivace	common time		Awake the harp
Day 4
11	Und Gott sprach: Es sei'n Lichter an der Feste des Himmels	Recitative secco	Tenor			common time	Gen 1:14–16	And God said : Let there be lights in the firmament of heaven
12	In vollem Glanze steiget jetzt die Sonne strahlend auf	Recitative	Tenor	D major	Andante	common time		In splendour bright is rising now the sun
12	Mit leisem Gang und sanftem Schimmer	Recitative	Tenor	D major	Più Adagio	common time		With softer beams and milder light
12	Den ausgedehnten Himmelsraum	Recitative	Tenor	D major	Più Adagio	common time		The space immense of th'azure sky
13	Die Himmel erzählen die Ehre Gottes	Chorus		C major	Allegro	cut time	Ps 19:1	The heavens are telling the glory of God
13	Dem kommenden Tage sagt es der Tag	Trio	S B T	C major	Allegro	cut time	Ps 19:2	To day that is coming speaks it the day
13	Die Himmel erzählen ...	Chorus		C major	Allegro	cut time		The heavens are telling ...
13	Dem kommenden Tage ...	Trio	S B T	C major	Allegro	cut time		To day that is coming ...
13	Die Himmel erzählen ...	Chorus		C major	Più allegro	cut time		The heavens are telling ...
13	Und seiner Hände Werk	Chorus, fugue		C major	Più allegro	cut time		The wonder of his works

Part I celebrates the creation of the primal light, the Earth, the heavenly bodies, bodies of water, weather, and plant life.

Prelude. Die Vorstellung des Chaos (The Representation of Chaos)

Overture
All sound examples sung in English by St Matthew's Choir, conducted by Phiroz Dalal

No. 1

One of the most famous numbers in the work, an overture in C minor in slow tempo, written in sonata form. Haydn depicts Chaos by withholding musical cadences from the ends of phrases.

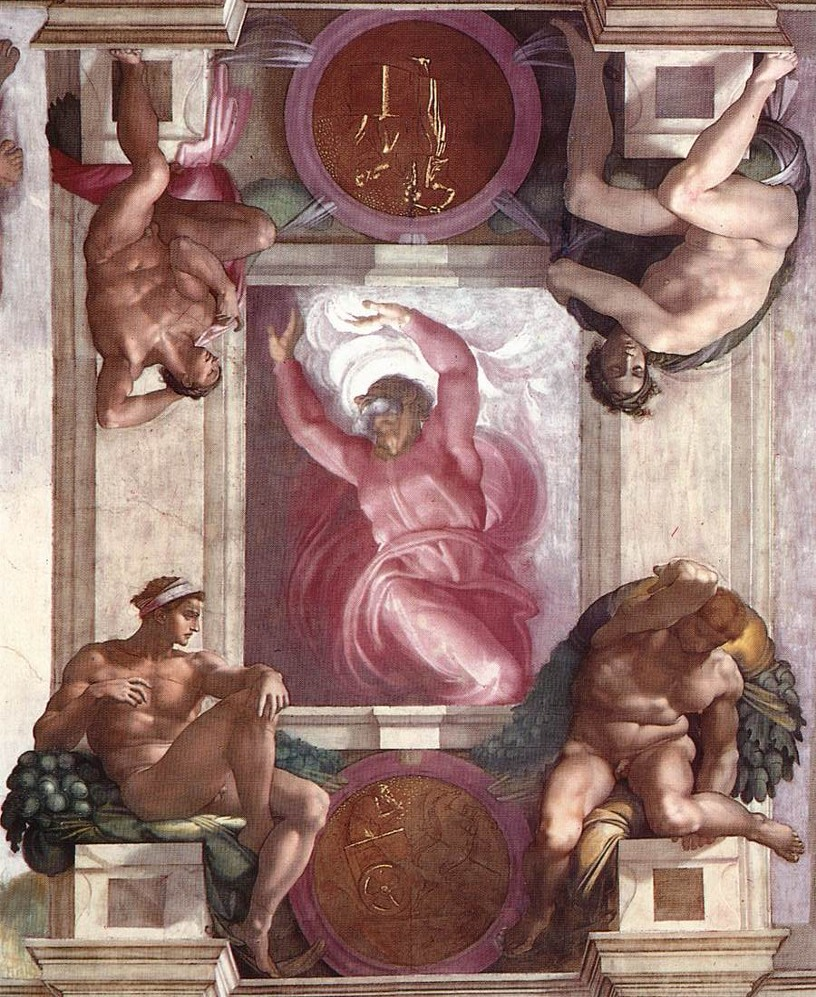
The first day of creation, from Michelangelo's Sistine Chapel ceiling

No. 1. Im Anfange schuf Gott Himmel und Erde (In the beginning God created Heaven and Earth)

This movement relates the words of Genesis 1:1–4. It begins with a recitative for bass solo in C minor, followed by choral presentation of the creation of light. The latter is depicted first with a soft pizzicato note from the strings, followed by a sudden surprise fortissimo C major chord on the word Licht (Light).

This moment created a sensation when the work was first played in public. According to a friend of the composer/:

At that moment when light broke out for the first time, one would have said that rays darted from the composer's burning eyes. The enchantment of the electrified Viennese was so general that the orchestra could not proceed for some minutes.

Following the appearance of light is a brief tenor recitative on the words "and God saw the light, that it was good", leading into:

No. 2. Nun schwanden vor dem heiligen Strahle (Now vanished by the holy beams)

No. 2

Aria for tenor with chorus in A major, portraying the defeat of Satan's host, from Paradise Lost.

End of the first day.

No. 3. Und Gott machte das Firmament

No. 3

No. 4

Long recitative for bass in C major. The bass part first gives the words of Genesis 1:6–7, then follows orchestral tone painting, describing the division of the waters from the land and the first storms.

No. 4. Mit Staunen sieht das Wunderwerk (The marv'lous work beholds amazed/The glorious hierarchy of heav'n)

Soprano solo with chorus, in C major. The heavenly hosts praise God and the work of the second day.

End of the second day.

No. 5. Und Gott sprach: Es sammle sich das Wasser (And God said let the waters)

No. 5

No. 6

No. 7

No. 8

No. 9

No. 10

Brief recitative for bass (Genesis 1:9–10), leading into:

No. 6. Rollend in schäumenden Wellen (Rolling in foaming billows)

Aria in D minor for bass, narrating the creation of seas, mountains, rivers, and (a coda in D major) brooks. As John Mangum points out, "it owes much to the rage arias common to the operas of the day".

No. 7. Und Gott sprach: Es bringe die Erde Gras hervor (And God said, Let all the earth bring forth grass)

Brief recitative for soprano (Genesis 1:11), leading into: No. 8. Nun beut die Flur das frische Grün (Now robed in cool refreshing green)

Solo aria in B♭ major for soprano, in siciliana rhythm, celebrating the creation of plants.

No. 9. Und die himmlischen Heerscharen verkündigten (And the Heavenly host proclaimed the third day)

Brief recitative for tenor, leading into:

No. 10. Stimmt an die Saiten (Awake the harp)

Chorus celebrating the third day, with four-part fugue on the words "For the heavens and earth/He has clothed in stately dress".

End of the third day.

No. 11. Und Gott sprach: Es sei'n Lichter an der Feste des Himmels (And God said : Let there be lights in the firmament of heaven)

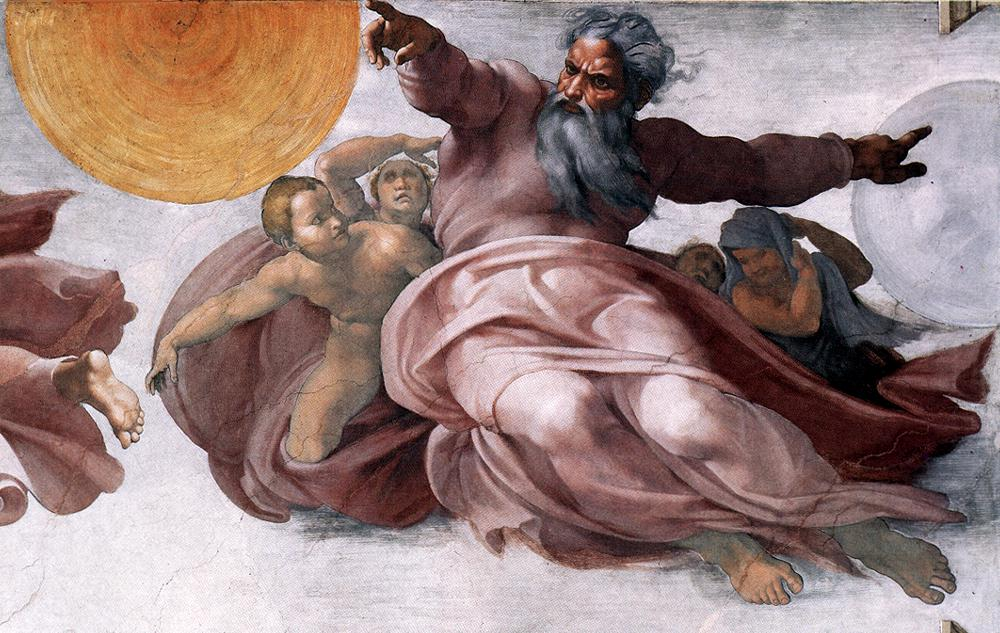
God creates the Sun and Moon: detail from Michelangelo's Sistine Chapel ceiling

No. 11

No. 12

No. 13

Recitative for tenor, with portions of Genesis 1:14–16.

No. 12. In vollem Glanze steiget jetzt die Sonne (In splendour bright is rising now/the sun)

With tenor narration, the orchestra portrays a brilliant sunrise, then a languid moonrise. The tune of the sunrise is simply ten notes of the D major scale, variously harmonized; the Moon rises in the subdominant key of G, also with a rising scale passage. The end of recitative briefly alludes to the new-created stars, then introduces:

No. 13. Die Himmel erzählen die Ehre Gottes (The heavens are telling the glory of God)

The text is based on Psalm 19:1–3, which had been set by Bach as the opening chorus of his cantata Die Himmel erzählen die Ehre Gottes, BWV 76.

Haydn's century, following on the discoveries of Newton, had the view that an orderly universe—particularly the mathematically governed motion of the heavenly bodies—attests to divine wisdom. Haydn, a naturally curious man, may have had an amateur interest in astronomy, as while in England he took the trouble to visit William Herschel, ex-composer and discoverer of Uranus, in his observatory in Slough.

"Die Himmel erzählen" is in the tonic major key of Part I; Part I then starts in C minor and ends in C major, showing the triumph of light over dark. It begins with alternation between celebratory choral passages and more meditative sequences from the three vocal soloists, followed by a choral fugue on the words "Und seiner Hände Werk zeigt an das Firmament", then a final homophonic section. ("The wonder of his works displays the firmament" is the English text here, with word-order calqued from the German, but somewhat awkward compared to the Authorized Version's "And the firmament sheweth the handywork of God".) The unusual intensity of the ending may be the result of Haydn's piling of coda upon coda, each occurring at a point where the music seems about to end.

End of the fourth day.

=== Part II ===
No.	Title	Form	Voice	Key	Tempo	Time	Source	Translation
Day 5
14	Und Gott sprach: Es bringe das Wasser in der Fülle hervor	Recitative	Soprano		Allegro	common time	Gen 1:20	And God said : Let the waters bring forth in plenty
15	Auf starkem Fittiche schwinget sich der Adler stolz	Aria	Soprano	F major	Moderato	cut time		On mighty wings the eagle proudly soars aloft
16	Und Gott schuf große Walfische	Recitative secco	Bass			common time	Gen 1:21–22	And God created great whales
16	Seid fruchtbar alle	Recitative	Bass		Poco Adagio	common time	Gen 1:21–22	Be fruitful all
17	Und die Engel rührten ihr' unsterblichen Harfen	Recitative secco	Bass			common time		And the angels struck their immortal harps
18	In holder Anmut stehn	Trio	S T B	A major	Moderato	2/4		In fairest raiment
19	Der Herr ist groß in seiner Macht	Trio and chorus	S T B		Vivace	common time		The Lord is great in his might
Day 6
20	Es bringe die Erde hervor lebende Geschöpfe	Recitative secco	Bass			common time	Gen 1:24	And God said : Let earth bring forth the living creature
21	Gleich öffnet sich der Erde Schoß (Note: various keys and tempo markings to illustrate different animals)	Recitative	Bass		Presto	common time		At once Earth opens her womb
21	Das zackig Haupt	Recitative	Bass		Presto	6/8		The nimble stag
21	Auf grünen Matten	Recitative	Bass		Andante	6/8		The cattle in herds
21	Wie Staub verbreitet sich	Recitative	Bass		Andante	common time		Unnumbered as the sands
21	In langen Zügen	Recitative	Bass		Adagio	common time		In long dimensions
22	Nun scheint in vollem Glanze der Himmel	Aria	Bass	D major	Allegro maestoso	3/4		Now shines heaven in the brightest glory
23	Und Gott schuf den Menschen	Recitative secco	Tenor			common time	Gen 1:27, Gen 2:7	And God created Man
24	Mit Würd' und Hoheit angetan	Aria	Tenor	C major	Andante	cut time		In native worth and honor clad
25	Und Gott sah jedes Ding	Recitative secco	Bass			common time	Gen 1:31	And God saw every thing
26	Vollendet ist das große Werk	Chorus		B♭ major	Vivace	common time		Fulfilled at last the great work
27	Zu dir, o Herr, blickt alles auf	Trio	S T B	E♭ major	Poco Adagio	3/4	Ps 145:15–16	All look up to thee, O Lord
28	Vollendet ist das große Werk	Chorus		B♭ major	Vivace	common time		Fulfilled at last the great work
28	Alles lobe seinen Namen	Chorus, fugue		B♭ major	Vivace	common time	Ps 148:13	Glory to his name forever

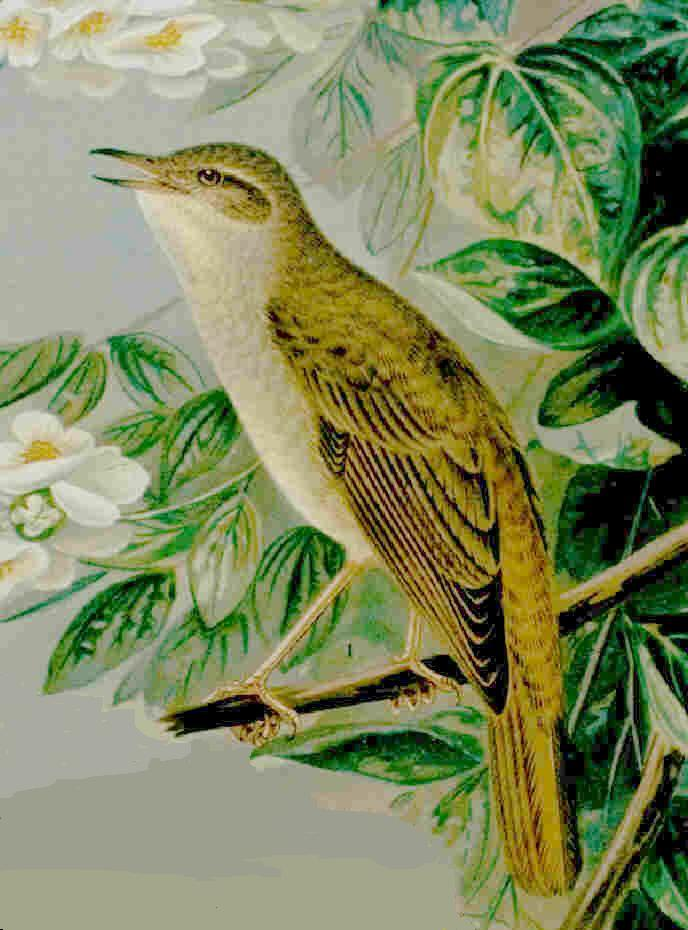
The nightingale (Luscinia megarhynchos), a literary symbol for millennia

Part II celebrates the creation of sea creatures, birds, animals, and lastly, man.

No. 14. Und Gott sprach: Es bringe das Wasser in der Fülle hervor (And God said : Let the waters bring forth in plenty)

No. 14

No. 15

No. 16

No. 17

No. 18

No. 19

Recitative for soprano (Genesis 1:20), leading into:

No. 15. Auf starkem Fittiche schwinget sich der Adler stolz (On mighty wings the eagle proudly soars aloft) Aria for soprano in F major, celebrating the creation of birds. The species mentioned are the eagle, the lark, the dove and the nightingale. The lyrics include the conceit that, at the time just after the Creation, the nightingale's song was not yet melancholy.

No. 16. Und Gott schuf große Walfische (And God created great whales.)

For bass solo, in D minor. While labeled a recitative in the score, it is more appropriately described as a recitative (from Genesis 1:21–22) followed by a very brief aria, the latter a verse paraphrase on the biblical words (Gen. 1:22) "Be fruitful and multiply." The bass sings in the voice of the Almighty, as quoted by the Archangel Raphael. The somber accompaniment uses no violins, but only the lower strings, with divided violas and cellos. For discussion of how this section was composed, see Gottfried van Swieten.

No. 17. Und die Engel rührten ihr' unsterblichen Harfen (And the angels struck their immortal harps.)

Brief recitative for bass, which by a skilled player may be realized with harp imitations in the accompaniment, leading into:

No. 18. In holder Anmut stehn (In fairest raiment)

Haydn breaks the regularity of the pattern "Recitative–Elaboration for solo–Celebratory chorus" with a meditative work in A major for the trio of vocalists, contemplating the beauty and immensity of the newly created world. This leads without a break to:

No. 19. Der Herr ist groß in seiner Macht (The Lord is great in his might)

Chorus with all three soloists, in A major, celebrating the fifth day. The line "...und ewig bleibt sein Ruhm" is, appropriately, repeated, seemingly without end.

End of the fifth day

No. 20. Und Gott sprach: Es bringe die Erde hervor lebende Geschöpfe (And God said : Let earth bring forth the living creature)

No. 20, 21 & 22

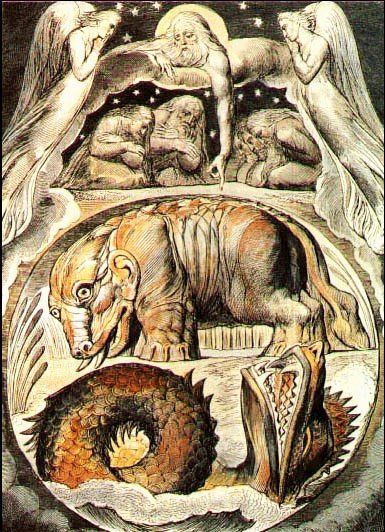
"By heavy beasts the ground is trod": God contemplates his created Behemoth and Leviathan, in an image by William Blake.

Recitative for bass (Genesis 1:24), leading into:

No. 21. Gleich öffnet sich der Erde Schoß (At once Earth opens her womb)

A movement of tone painting with bass narration. Haydn's gentle sense of humor is indulged here as the newly created creatures appear, each with musical illustration: lion, tiger, stag, horse, cattle, sheep, insects, and worms. As always in Haydn's oratorio tone painting, the sung verbal explanation comes after the orchestral portrayal.

The transition from glamorous animals (the first four) to prosaic ones (the last four) is marked with an unprepared modulation from D♭ to A major. The farm animals are portrayed (as in No. 8) with siciliana rhythm, which plainly had bucolic associations for Haydn. Basses who can sing a low D (D_{2}) are often tempted to use it on the final note "Wurm", instead of the D an octave higher as written by Haydn.

No. 22. Nun scheint in vollem Glanze der Himmel (Now shines heaven in the brightest glory)

Aria for bass in D major, in 3/4 time. The theme is

Doch war noch alles nicht vollbracht
Dem Ganzen fehlte das Geschöpf
Das Gottes Werke dankbar seh'n
Des Herren Güte preisen soll.

Yet not all was complete,
The whole lacked a being
Who would behold God's work with thanks
And praise the Lord's goodness.

Thus the movement is preparatory to the creation of man.

The first part of the movement contains another brief but notable bit of tone painting: a fortissimo bottom B♭ (sounding in octaves) for bassoons and contrabassoon accompanying the last word of the line, "By heavy beasts the ground is trod."

No. 23. Und Gott schuf den Menschen (And God created Man)

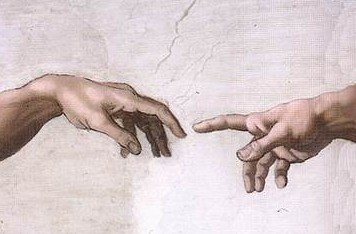
Detail from The Creation of Adam by Michelangelo, c.1512

No. 23

No. 24

No. 25

No. 26

No. 27

No. 28

Tenor recitative (Genesis 1:27, 2:7), leading to:

No. 24. Mit Würd' und Hoheit angetan (In native worth and honor clad)

A prized aria for tenor, in C major, celebrating the creation of man, then woman. Often sung outside the context of The Creation. Although the aria relates a Biblical story, the virtues attributed to Adam (and not Eve) clearly reflect the values of the Enlightenment.

This was almost certainly the last music from The Creation that Haydn ever heard: it was sung for him several days before his death in 1809 as a gesture of respect by a French military officer, a member of Napoleon's invading army.

No. 25. Und Gott sah jedes Ding (And God saw every thing)

Brief recitative for bass (text amplifying Genesis 1:31), leading to:

No. 26. Vollendet ist das große Werk (The great work is complete)

A celebration for chorus alone, in B♭, of the sixth day. In the Biblical story (Genesis 2:1-3) this day was the end of Creation, since God rested on the seventh day, the first Sabbath.

No. 27. Zu dir, o Herr, blickt alles auf (All look up to thee, O Lord)

Another meditation for the three angels (compare No. 18), in E♭ major, on God's omnipotence and mercy, quoting Psalm 145:15–16. The bass solo line "Du wendest ab dein Angesicht" requires the singer to terrify the audience with barely-audible pianissimo. The end of the trio is followed without pause by...

No. 28. Vollendet ist das große Werk (Fulfilled at last the great work)

This chorus begins with the same music and words as No. 26, and is in the same key of B♭. It quickly moves into large double fugue on the words "Alles lobe seinen Namen, denn er allein ist hoch erhaben" ("Let all praise his name, for he alone is sublime"). As appropriate to the finale of Part II, this repeat chorus is longer and ends more intensely than the first.

The pattern of the last three numbers of Part II, with two celebratory movements on the same theme flanking a slower meditative movement, echoes countless settings of the Latin Mass, where similar or identical choruses on Hosanna in excelsis flank a meditative section on Benedictus.

=== Part III ===
No.	Title	Form	Voice	Key	Tempo	Time	Translation
Day 7
29	Aus Rosenwolken bricht	Recitative	Tenor	E major	Largo	3/4	In rosy mantle appears
30	Von deiner Güt, o Herr und Gott / Gesegnet sei des Herren Macht	Duet with chorus	S B	C major	Adagio	cut time	By thy goodness, O bounteous Lord / Forever blessed be his Pow'r
30	Der Sterne hellster / Macht kund auf eurer weiten Bahn	Duet with chorus	S B	F major	Allegretto	2/4	Of stars the fairest / Proclaim in your extended course
30	Heil dir, o Gott!	Chorus		F major	Allegretto	2/4	Hail, bounteous Lord!
31	Nun ist die erste Pflicht erfüllt	Recitative	S B		Allegro	common time	Our first duty we have now performed
32	Holde Gattin, dir zur Seite	Duet	S B	E♭ major	Adagio	3/4	Sweet companion, at thy side
32	Der tauende Morgen	Duet	S B	E♭ major	Allegro	2/4	The dew dropping morn
33	O glücklich Paar, und glücklich immerfort	Recitative secco	Tenor			common time	O happy pair, and ever happy henceforth
34	Singt dem Herren alle Stimmen!	Chorus		B♭ major	Andante	common time	Sing the Lord, ye voices all
34	Des Herren Ruhm, er bleibt in Ewigkeit	Chorus (fugue) with soli	S A T B	B♭ major	Allegro	common time	The praise of the Lord will endure forever

Part III takes place in the Garden of Eden, and narrates the happy first hours of Adam and Eve.

No. 29. Aus Rosenwolken bricht (In rosy mantle appears)

No. 29

No. 30

No. 31

No. 32

No. 33

No. 34

Orchestral prelude in slow tempo depicting dawn in the Garden of Eden, followed by recitative for tenor representing Uriel. Adam and Eve are seen walking hand in hand. An E major chord from the strings introduce the prelude, then three flutes play a peaceful melody (the third flute is tacet after this movement)

The key is E major, very remote from the flat-side keys that have dominated the work so far. Various commentators suggest that this was meant by Haydn to convey the remoteness of Earth from Heaven, or to contrast the sinfulness of people with the perfection of angels.

No. 30. Von deiner Güt', o Herr und Gott (By thy goodness, O bounteous Lord)

Adam and Eve offer a prayer of thanks in C major, accompanied by a chorus of angels.

This movement, the longest in The Creation, has three parts. In the first, marked adagio, Adam and Eve sing their prayer, with the chorus singing underneath them accompanied by soft timpani rolls. In the second section, the tempo picks up, and Adam, Eve, and the angels praise the newly created world. The final section is for chorus and orchestra alone, a celebration on the words "Wir preisen dich in Ewigkeit" ("We praise thee eternally").

No. 31. Nun ist die erste Pflicht erfüllt (Our first duty we have now performed)

Recitative for Adam and Eve, leading to:

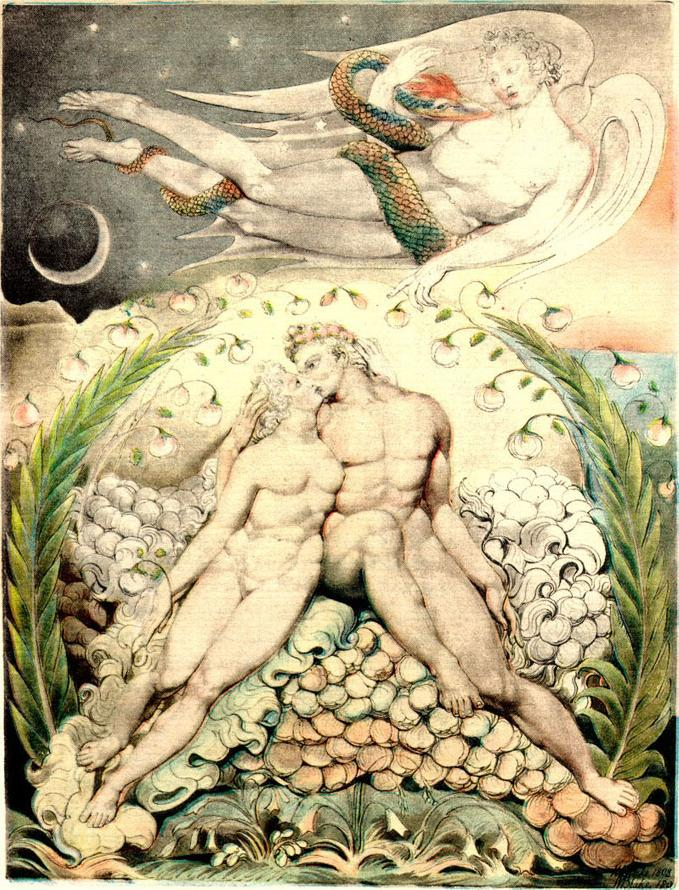
'Satan Watching the Caresses of Adam and Eve', watercolor by William Blake (1808)

No. 32. Holde Gattin, dir zur Seite (Sweet companion, at thy side)

Love duet for Adam and Eve in E♭ major. There is a slow initial section, followed by an Allegro. The style is clearly influenced by comic opera, a genre in which Haydn had extensive experience. For some commentators the music evokes the blissful comic duet sung by Papageno and Papagena near the end of Mozart's The Magic Flute.

No. 33. O glücklich Paar, und glücklich immerfort (O happy pair, and ever happy henceforth)

Uriel briefly explains to the pair that they will be happy always if they will refrain from wanting to have, or wishing to know, more than they should. This is the only reference to the fall of humanity.

No. 34. Singt dem Herren alle Stimmen! (Sing the Lord, ye voices all)

Final chorus in B♭ major. There is a slow introduction, followed by a double fugue on the words "Des Herren Ruhm, er bleibt in Ewigkeit" ("The praise of the Lord will endure forever"), with passages for the vocal soloists and a final homophonic section.

== Recordings ==
Recordings of The Creation / Die Schöpfung
Conductor / Choir / Orchestra	Soloists	Label	Year
Clemens Krauss Vienna Philharmonic	Trude Eipperle; Julius Patzak; Georg Hann	Phonographie PH 5029/30	1942 in Vienna
Eugen Jochum BR Choir BRSO	Irmgard Seefried; Walther Ludwig; Hans Hotter	Melodram GM 4.0055	28 April 1951 in Munich (live)
Karl Forster Choir of the St. Hedwig's Cathedral, Berlin	Elisabeth Grümmer; Josef Traxel; Gottlob Frick	EMI CZS 7 62595 2	1960
Joseph Keilberth Kölner Rundfunkchor	Annelies Kupper; Josef Traxel; Josef Greindl; Käthe Kraus; Walter Berry	Andromeda ANDRCD 9037	1962
Herbert von Karajan Singverein der Gesellschaft der Musikfreunde Wien Wiener Philharmoniker	Gundula Janowitz; Fritz Wunderlich; Kim Borg; Hermann Prey	Arkadia CDKAR 203.2	8 August 1965 in Salzburg (live)
Herbert von Karajan Wiener Singverein Berlin Philharmonic	Gundula Janowitz; Christa Ludwig; Dietrich Fischer-Dieskau; Walter Berry; Werner Krenn; Fritz Wunderlich	Deutsche Grammophon 289449 761–2	1966 and later, released 1969
Leonard Bernstein Camerata Singers New York Philharmonic	Judith Raskin; John Reardon; Alexander Young	Sony SM2K 47560	1966. For details, see Haydn: The Creation (Leonard Bernstein 1966 recording)
Eugen Jochum BR Choir BRSO	Agnes Giebel; Waldemar Kmentt; Gottlob Frick	Philips S-C 71 AX 201	1966 and later, reissued 1990
Karl Münchinger Wiener Staatsopernchor Vienna Philharmonic	Elly Ameling; Werner Krenn; Tom Krause	Decca 362-3	1967
David Willcocks Choir of King's College, Cambridge Academy of St Martin in the Fields	Heather Harper; Robert Tear; John Shirley-Quirk	EMI SLS 971	1972 (sung in English; recorded in King's College Chapel, Cambridge)
Helmut Koch Rundfunkchor Berlin Berlin Radio Symphony Orchestra	Regina Werner-Dietrich; Peter Schreier; Theo Adam	Berlin Classics 0091152BC	1976
Antal Doráti Brighton Festival Chorus	Lucia Popp; Werner Hollweg; Kurt Moll; Helena Döse; Benjamin Luxon	Decca 443 027-2	1977
Neville Marriner Academy of St Martin in the Fields	Edith Mathis; Aldo Baldin; Dietrich Fischer-Dieskau	Philips 416 449	1980
Sigiswald Kuijken Collegium Vocale Gent La Petite Bande	Krisztina Laki; Neil Mackie; Philippe Huttenlocher	Accent / Harmonia Mundi ACC8228	1982 (on period instruments in concert at the Conservatoire Royal de Musique de Liege)
Leonard Bernstein BR Choir BRSO	Kurt Moll; Lucia Popp; Thomas Moser; Judith Blegen; Kurt Ollmann	Deutsche Grammophon (CD and DVD)	1986 (concert in the Benedictine Abbey of Ottobeuren)
Rafael Kubelík BR Choir BRSO	Margaret Marshall; Lucia Popp; Gwynne Howell; Vinson Cole; Bernd Weikl	Orfeo LC 8175	1987
Christopher Hogwood Academy of Ancient Music Academy of Ancient Music	Emma Kirkby; Anthony Rolfe Johnson; Michael George	Decca 430 397–2	1990 (sung in English, period instruments)
James Levine: Rundfunkchor Stockholm; Stockholmer Kammerchor; Berliner Philharmoniker	Kathleen Battle; Gösta Winbergh; Kurt Moll	Deutsche Grammophon B000024Z74	1991
Simon Rattle CBSO Chorus City of Birmingham Symphony Orchestra	Arleen Auger; Philip Langridge; David Thomas	EMI Records CDS 7 54159 2	1991 (sung in a new English translation edited by Nicholas Temperley)
John Eliot Gardiner Monteverdi Choir English Baroque Soloists	Sylvia McNair; Donna Brown; Michael Schade; Gerald Finley; Rod Gilfry	Deutsche Grammophon Archiv 449 217–2	1995 (period instruments)
William Christie Les Arts Florissants	Genia Kühmeier; Toby Spence; Dietrich Henschel; Sophie Karthäuser; Markus Werba	Virgin Classics 0946 3 95235 2 8	2007 (period instruments)
Colin Davis London Symphony Chorus London Symphony Orchestra	Sally Matthews; Ian Bostridge; Dietrich Henschel	LSO Live LSO0628	2007
Paul McCreesh Chetham's Chamber Choir Gabrieli Consort and Players	Mark Padmore; Miah Persson; Neal Davies; Sandrine Piau; Ruth Massey; Paul Harvey	Deutsche Grammophon Archiv 477 7361	2008 (issued; sung in English)
René Jacobs RIAS Kammerchor Freiburger Barockorchester	Julia Kleiter; Maximilian Schmitt; Johannes Weisser	Harmonia Mundi Archiv 992039.4	2009 (issued)
Martin Pearlman Boston Baroque orchestra and choir	Amanda Forsythe; Keith Jameson; Kevin Deas	Linn Records CKD 401	2012, in German
Harry Christophers Handel and Haydn Society	Sarah Tynan; Jeremy Ovenden; Matthew Brook	CORO COR16135	2015, live recording from the Symphony Hall, Boston

The 2009 recording was nominated for a Grammy Award in 2011 for Best Choral Performance and was the top pick by pianist Iain Burnside on the 2013 broadcast of BBC 3'S CD Review – Building a Library.

== Sources ==
Haydn's original autograph score has been lost since 1803. A Viennese published score dated 1800 forms the basis of most performances today. The score used for performances by the Tonkünstler-Societät in 1799, with notes in the composer's hand, is kept in the Vienna State Library. There are various other copyist scores such as the Estate, as well as hybrid editions prepared by scholars during the last two centuries.

== Notes and references ==
=== Sources ===
- Rosen, Charles (1997). The Classical Style: Haydn, Mozart, Beethoven. New York: Norton. ISBN 9780393317121.
