= Nicholas Temperley =

American musicologist

Nicholas Mark Temperley (August 7, 1932 – April 8, 2020) was an American musicologist of English background. He is known for his pioneering work in British music studies.

== Education and career ==
Born in Beaconsfield, United Kingdom, Temperley attended Eton College from 1945 to 1951. After a year at the Royal College of Music in London, he enrolled at King's College, Cambridge in 1952, eventually earning his doctorate there in 1959 with a dissertation entitled "Instrumental Music in England, 1800–1850." Later that year, Temperley began a postdoctoral fellowship at the University of Illinois, which lasted until 1961. After holding positions at Cambridge and Yale University, he returned to the University of Illinois, spending the remainder of his career there. He became an American citizen in 1972.

Temperley published many journal articles in outlets such as Early Music, the Journal of the American Musicological Society, Music & Letters, The Musical Times, 19th-Century Music, and the Journal of the Royal Musical Association. In addition to his work involving British music of diverse genres, he made important contributions for other composers, including Haydn, Berlioz, and Chopin. His reference articles, including dozens authored for The New Grove Dictionary of Music and Musicians, also demonstrate his wide range. In 1980, his two-volume The Music of the English Parish Church received the American Musicological Society's Otto Kinkeldey Award for the most distinguished book published in the field during the previous year. From 1978 until 1980 he was the editor-in-chief of the Journal of the American Musicological Society. When the North American British Music Studies Association (NABMSA) formed in 2004, Temperley served as its first president. The prize given for “a student paper of particular merit or excellence” at its biennial conference is named after him.

== Books (sole authorship) ==
- Jonathan Gray and Church Music in York, 1770–1840. Borthwick Papers No. 51. St. Anthony's Press, 1977. ISBN 978-0900701443.
- The Music of the English Parish Church. 2 Vols. Cambridge University Press, 1979. ISBN 0-521-22045-9, 0-521-22046-7.
- Haydn: The Creation. Cambridge Music Handbooks. Cambridge University Press, 1991. ISBN 978-0521372558.
- Bound for America: Three British Composers. Music in American Life. University of Illinois Press, 2003. ISBN 978-0252028472.
- Studies in English Church Music. Variorum Collected Studies. Routledge, 2018. ISBN 978-1138375369.
