= Daniel Heartz =

American musicologist (1928–2019)

- Born: October 5, 1928; Exeter, New Hampshire
- Died: November 24, 2019 (aged 91); Berkeley, California
- Education: PhD (Harvard)
- Occupation: Musicologist
- Writing career
- Subject: Music
- Notable works: Mozart, Haydn and Early Beethoven; Music in European Capitals; The Galant Style, 1720–1780; Pierre Attaingnant

Daniel Heartz (October 5, 1928 – November 24, 2019) was an American musicologist and professor of music at the University of California, Berkeley.

Heartz studied at Harvard University. He lived in Berkeley, California.

== Honors ==
- Recipient of Guggenheim Fellowships
- ASCAP–Deems Taylor Awards
- Kinkeldey Award of the American Musicological Society.

== Selected bibliography ==
- Artists and Musicians: Portrait Studies from the Rococo to the Revolution, with contributing studies by Paul Corneilson and John A. Rice, ed. Beverly Wilcox, Ann Arbor, MI: Steglein, 2014. ISBN 978-0-9819850-7-7
- Mozart, Haydn and Early Beethoven. 1781–1802, New York, W. W. Norton, 2008. ISBN 0-393-06634-7
- From Garrick to Gluck: Essays on Opera in the Age of Enlightenment, ed. John A. Rice, Hillsdale, NY: Pendragon Press, 2004. ISBN 1-57647-081-4
- Music in European Capitals. The Galant Style, 1720–1780, New York: W.W. Norton, 2003. ISBN 0-393-05080-7
- Haydn, Mozart and the Viennese School. 1740-1780, New York, W. W. Norton, 1995. ISBN 0-393-03712-6
- Mozart's Operas, Berkeley: University of California Press, 1990. ISBN 0-520-07872-1
- Mozart. Idomeneo (Neue Ausgabe sämtlicher Werke ii/5/11), Kassel, 1972.
- Pierre Attaingnant. Royal Printer of Music, Berkeley: University of California Press, 1969. ISBN 0-520-01563-0
