= Jahn's Hall =

18th century performance venue

Jahn's Hall was a concert hall in late 18th century Vienna. It was the property of a restaurateur/caterer named Ignaz Jahn, and seated (according to Deutsch) "400 at the most". It is remembered as a performance venue for works by Wolfgang Amadeus Mozart and Ludwig van Beethoven.

== Ignaz Jahn ==
Jahn was born in Hungary in 1744 and died in Vienna, 26 February 1810. He was appointed Imperial caterer for Schönbrunn Palace in 1772. In 1775 he began running a restaurant in the Augarten, and in 1782 opened an adjacent concert hall, at which many famous musicians played over the years.

Jahn's Hall was a part of Jahn's restaurant, in the main part of the city, which as of 1788 was at 6 Himmelpfortgasse. Concerts began there after the restaurant opened, and were given on a regular basis starting in 1790.

In 2018 a restaurant opened close to Augarten, carrying his name.

== Works by Mozart ==
- His transcription of Georg Frideric Handel's masque Acis and Galatea was premiered there roughly November 1788.
- His last public appearance took place in this hall on 4 March 1791. Contrary to the claim of many authors it is not known which piano concerto Mozart performed at this concert.
- The blind glass harmonica performer Marianne Kirchgessner performed in the hall 8 September 1791; she may have included the Adagio and Rondo K. 617 that Mozart wrote for her.
- The first public performance of Mozart's Requiem took place in the hall on 2 January 1793. This was a benefit concert on behalf of Mozart's widow Constanze, organized by Mozart's patron Gottfried van Swieten; it raised "more than 300 golden ducats" (about 1350 florins, a substantial sum) to support Constanze and her two sons.

== Works by Beethoven ==
- On 6 April 1797, Beethoven performed in the hall, as the pianist in his Quintet for Piano and Winds, Opus 16.
- On 29 March 1798 Mozart's old friend the soprano Josepha Duschek gave a concert in the hall, performing an unidentified "rondo with obbligato basset horn". On the same program, Ludwig van Beethoven performed one of his violin sonatas ( with the violinist Ignaz Schuppanzigh.
- On 20 December 1799, Beethoven's Septet, Opus 20, was premiered in the hall.
