= Werner Krenn =

Austrian tenor (born 1943)

Werner Krenn (born 21 September 1943 in Vienna) is an Austrian tenor.

Krenn received his first musical training as a member of the boys' choir Wiener Sängerknaben. He later studied bassoon and was principal bassoonist of the Wiener Symphoniker from 1962 to 1966. His singing talents were recognized, and he embarked upon voice lessons with Elisabeth Rado. Krenn made his operatic debut in The Fairy Queen at the Berlin Deutsche Oper. He made a number of notable recordings of Schubert in the late 1960s. He was a regular performer with the Vienna State Opera in the 1970s. Krenn performed in Salzburg in Beethoven's Missa Solemnis, conducted by Herbert von Karajan. The Musical Times said of him in 1971, "Werner Krenn's voice is sweet and true and earnest". He has performed with the Scottish Opera and the BBC International Concert at the Royal Festival Hall. He is married to soprano Helga Dernesch.
