= Georg August Griesinger =

Georg August von Griesinger (8 January 1769 – 9 April 1845) was a tutor and diplomat resident in Vienna during the late 18th and 19th centuries. He is remembered for his friendships with the composers Joseph Haydn and Ludwig van Beethoven, and for the biography he wrote of Haydn.

== Early life and career ==
He was born in Stuttgart on 8 January 1769. His father was Georg Christoph Griesinger (1734/5 - 1782), who was a lawyer and civil servant. He grew up in Stuttgart and attended university, studying theology, in Tübingen. He later worked as a tutor in an aristocratic home in Morges, Switzerland. In 1799, he moved to Vienna, in order to work as the tutor of the son of Count Johann Hilmar Adolph Schönfeld, the ambassador of Saxony to Austria. He remained in Vienna for the rest of his life, but changed careers there in 1804, becoming a diplomat at the Saxon embassy. He first held the rank of secretary, then counsellor and finally (1831) chargé d'affaires.

== Relations with Haydn ==
In Saxony Griesinger had become acquainted with Gottfried Härtel, head of the Leipzig publishing firm of Breitkopf & Härtel. When he moved to Vienna, the firm asked him to help negotiate a publishing agreement with Joseph Haydn. These negotiations were fully successful, and resulted in Breitkopf & Härtel producing a "complete works" edition of Haydn's compositions. Griesinger became Haydn's friend, and often visited him after his efforts were no longer needed for business reasons.

=== Haydn biography ===
Griesinger eventually conceived the idea of writing a biography of Haydn, and when he came home from his visits to the composer, he wrote down the words he remembered, in hopes of increasing the accuracy of his work. The book appeared first as a sequence of eight installments in the Breitkopf & Härtel journal Allgemeine musikalische Zeitung, then, after revisions, as an independent work in 1810 (Biographische Notizen über Joseph Haydn, Leipzig).

Particularly in comparison to work of other Haydn biographers of the same time (e.g. Giuseppe Carpani and Albert Christoph Dies), Griesinger's stands out for its careful writing, thoughtfulness, care with facts, and reluctance to embellish. Haydn scholar Vernon Gotwals considered it a clear first choice among the early biographies for obtaining facts about Haydn's life.

The letters that Griesinger sent to Breitkopf & Härtel also serve as a valuable source for the lives of both Haydn and Beethoven.

== Relations with Beethoven ==
In 1802 the Breitkopf & Härtel firm asked Griesinger to negotiate for them with the newly-prominent composer Ludwig van Beethoven. As with the earlier Haydn negotiations, these were successful and led to a long-term friendship between Griesinger and Beethoven.

The relationship between Beethoven and Breitkopf & Härtel began not at all smoothly. Beethoven offered the firm his String Quintet in C, published by Breitkopf & Härtel in 1802 as Opus 29. However, to Breitkopf & Härtel's surprise, the rival publishing firm of Artaria also issued an edition of this work, which would have reduced Breitkopf & Härtel's profits from it. Gottfried Härtel initially felt that Beethoven was responsible for this, and there was acrimonious correspondence between the two. Beethoven's brother Kaspar urged the company to bring in Griesinger onto the case, knowing that Beethoven liked and trusted him. On intervening, Griesinger wrote to the firm, insisting that Beethoven "is a man devoid of duplicity and deceit." The dispute was resolved. Beethoven later published with the firm again, and during the years 1809-1812 they were his primary publishers, with Griesinger again serving as intermediary.

Beethoven at one point read Griesinger's biography of Haydn, and he admired it. A note he wrote to Griesinger in 1822 expressing his appreciation is preserved.

In 1823, Griesinger helped Beethoven find aristocratic patronage for the Missa Solemnis.

== Death ==
Griesinger died in Vienna on 9 April 1845.
