= Papa Haydn =

Nickname for Joseph Haydn

The composer Joseph Haydn is sometimes given the nickname "Papa" Haydn. The practice began in Haydn's lifetime and has continued to the present day.

Höslinger (2009) identifies three senses of the term, discussed below in the order of their chronological origin.

== "Papa" as a term of affection ==
"Papa Haydn" started out as a term of affection bestowed on Haydn by the musicians who worked for him. After 1766 Haydn was the Kapellmeister at the Esterházy court, presiding over a fairly large group of musicians. His authority was evidently rather benevolent, as he often interceded with Prince Esterházy on behalf of musicians who had gotten in trouble. The tale of the "Farewell" Symphony attests to Haydn's willingness to act on behalf of his subordinates. The practice of calling Haydn "Papa" became increasingly plausible as Haydn's 30-plus years of service in the Eszterházy court went by; with each year, he would have become increasingly older than the average musician serving under him.

As time went by, the group of musicians who called Haydn "Papa" expanded beyond the Esterházy court and included Haydn's friend Wolfgang Amadeus Mozart.

Höslinger summarizes this aspect of "Papa Haydn" thus: "'Papa' arose as a term of affection, commonly used by the Esterházy players ... for a father figure, somebody who willingly gave advice and who was generally respected as a musician." He notes that in Haydn's time the term was used for other musicians as well; e.g. "Franz Schubert called Salieri his 'Grosspapa' (German: 'grandad')".

== "Papa" as founder ==
Another sense of the term "Papa Haydn" came from his role in the history of classical music, notably in the development of the symphony and string quartet. While Haydn did not invent either genre, his work is considered important enough that the labels "Father of the Symphony" and "Father of the String Quartet" are often attached to him. Even in his own lifetime, this perspective was prevalent. In 1797, the Tonkünstler-Societät of Vienna passed the resolution to make him a life member, "by virtue of his extraordinary merit as the father and reformer of the noble art of music." When in 1798 Franz Niemetschek published a biography of Mozart, he dedicated the book to Haydn, calling him "father of the noble art of music and favorite of the Muses."

Höslinger asserts that this usage of "Papa Haydn" increased during the 19th century, "as the sense of reverence for older composers increased."

== "Papa" as pejorative ==
This usage, which arose in the 19th century, is characterized thus by Höslinger: it is "a more patronizing, even dismissive one. In comparison with Romantic artists and Romantic music, Haydn and his output were seen as genial, but naive and superficial."

With the rise of acclaim for Haydn's music during the 20th century, the patronizing sense of "Papa Haydn" caused scholars and critics to become leery of the term, seeing it as a distortion of the composer's work. For example, Haydn scholar Jens Peter Larsen wrote (1980):

For years the nickname 'Papa Haydn' has characterized the composer. Used by his own musicians and others as a tribute of affection and respect, the expression increasingly took on misleading connotations, and came to signify a benevolent but bewigged and old-fashioned classic. The recent revival of interest in Haydn's music has made plain that the traditional picture had become a caricature, and that it gave a false impression of richness and diversity of his development as a composer.

"Papa Haydn" was used in a children's song, sung to the first bars of the second movement of the Surprise Symphony:

Papa Haydn's dead and gone
but his memory lingers on.
When his mood was one of bliss
he wrote jolly tunes like this.

== Notes ==
=== Sources ===
- Brown, A. Peter (2002) The First Golden Age of the Viennese Symphony: Haydn, Mozart, Beethoven, and Schubert, vol. 2 of The Symphonic Repertoire. Bloomington: Indiana University Press. ISBN 978-0253334879
- Deutsch, Otto Erich (1965). Mozart: A Documentary Biography. Stanford, California: Stanford University Press.
- Geiringer, Karl; Irene Geiringer (1982). Haydn: A Creative Life in Music (3rd ed.). University of California Press. xii, 403. ISBN 0-520-04316-2.
- Höslinger, Clemens (2009). "Papa Haydn". In David Wyn Jones (ed.). Oxford Composer Companions: Haydn. Oxford University Press.
- Larsen, Jens Peter (1980). "Joseph Haydn". The New Grove Dictionary of Music and Musicians. Larsen's article was published separately as The New Grove: Haydn, Norton, New York, 1982.
