= The Seven Last Words of Christ (Haydn) =

1786 orchestral work by Joseph Haydn

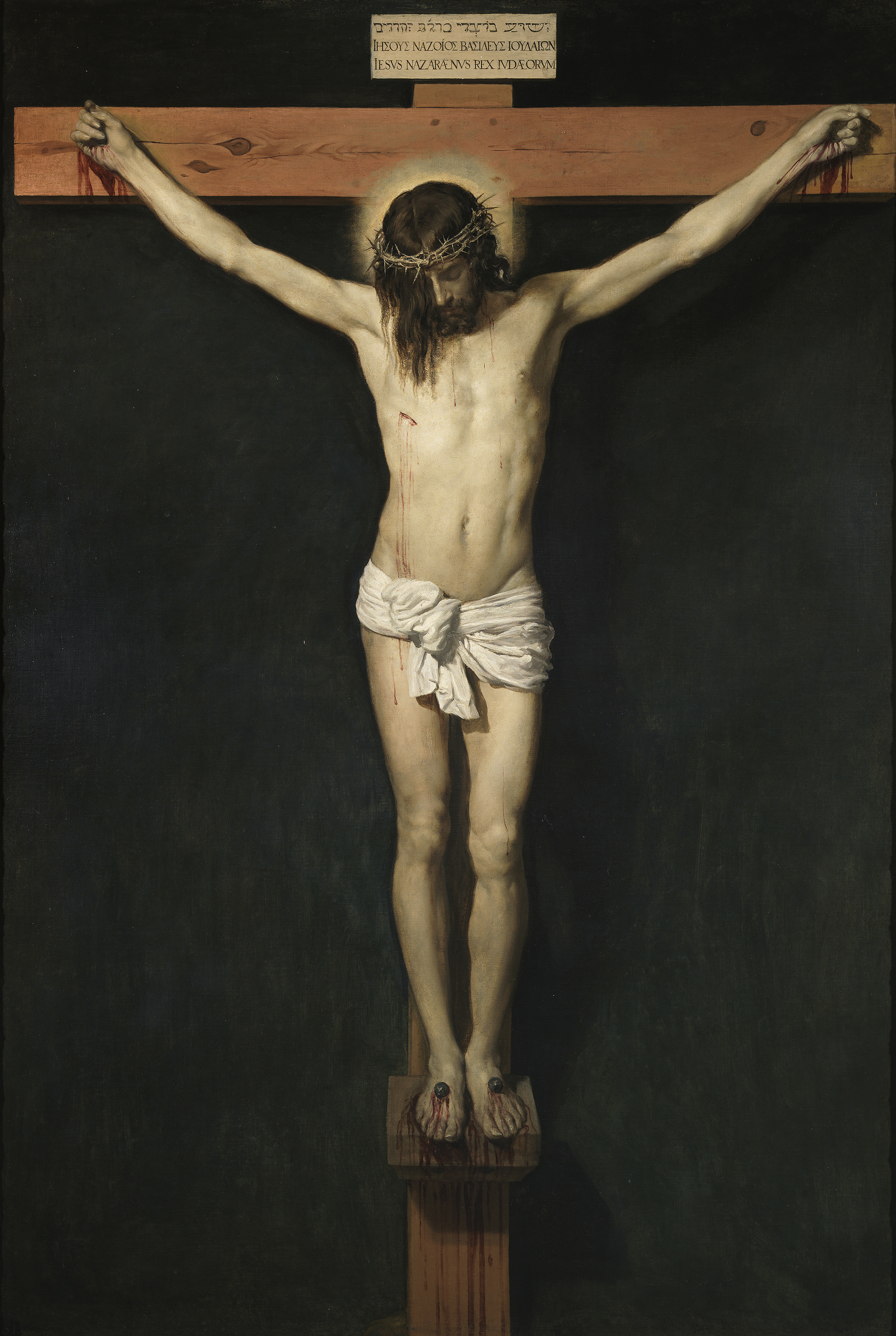
Christ Crucified (1632) by Velázquez

The Seven Last Words of Our Saviour on the Cross (German: Die sieben letzten Worte unseres Erlösers am Kreuze) is an orchestral work by Joseph Haydn, commissioned in 1786 for the Good Friday service at Oratorio de la Santa Cueva (Holy Cave Oratory) in Cádiz, Spain. Published in 1787 and performed then in Paris, Rome, Berlin and Vienna, the composer adapted it in 1787 for string quartet, approved a version for solo piano in the same year, and finally adapted it in 1796 as an oratorio (with both solo and choral vocal forces).

The seven main meditative sections are based on seven expressions attributed to Jesus during his crucifixion. The seven sections are labelled "sonatas" and are all slow. They are framed by a slow Introduction and a fast "Earthquake" conclusion, for a total of nine movements.

== Origin ==
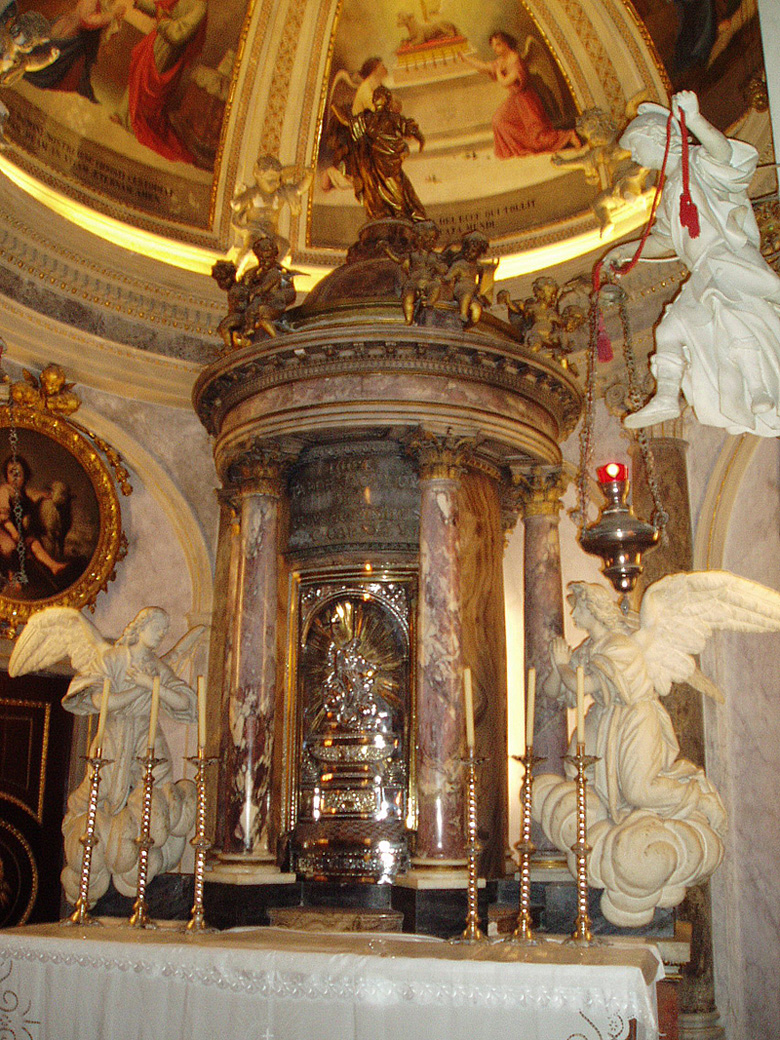
Oratorio de la Santa Cueva, Cádiz

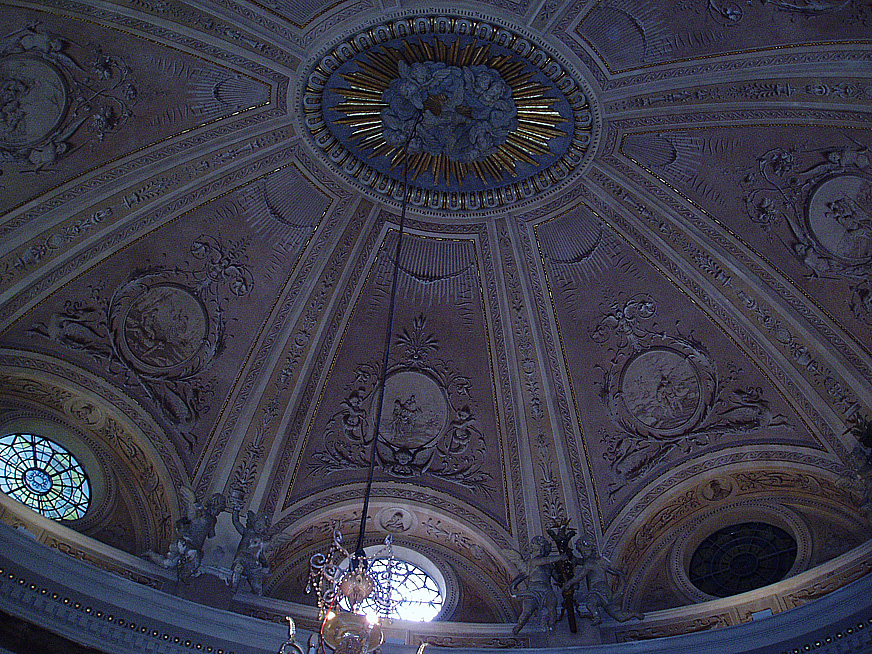
"The walls, windows, and pillars of the church were hung with black cloth, and only one large lamp hanging from the centre of the roof broke the solemn darkness."

Haydn himself explained the origin and difficulty of writing the work when the publisher Breitkopf & Härtel issued (in 1801) a new edition and requested a preface:

Some fifteen years ago I was requested by a canon of Cádiz to compose instrumental music on the Seven Last Words of Our Savior On the Cross. It was customary at the Cathedral of Cádiz to produce an oratorio every year during Lent, the effect of the performance being not a little enhanced by the following circumstances. The walls, windows, and pillars of the church were hung with black cloth, and only one large lamp hanging from the center of the roof broke the solemn darkness. At midday, the doors were closed and the ceremony began. After a short service the bishop ascended the pulpit, pronounced the first of the seven words (or sentences) and delivered a discourse thereon. This ended, he left the pulpit and fell to his knees before the altar. The interval was filled by music. The bishop then in like manner pronounced the second word, then the third, and so on, the orchestra following on the conclusion of each discourse. My composition was subject to these conditions, and it was no easy task to compose seven adagios lasting ten minutes each, and to succeed one another without fatiguing the listeners; indeed, I found it quite impossible to confine myself to the appointed limits.

The priest who commissioned the work, Don José Sáenz de Santa María, had reconditioned the Oratorio de la Santa Cueva, and paid Haydn in a most unusual way – sending the composer a cake which Haydn discovered was filled with gold coins.

== Original orchestral version (1786) ==
The original 1786 work, for full classical orchestra (instrumentation: 2 flutes, 2 oboes, 2 bassoons, 2 horns, 2 trumpets, timpani, strings), is as follows:

1. Introduzione in D minor – Maestoso ed Adagio
2. Sonata I ("Pater, dimitte illis, quia nesciunt, quid faciunt") in B♭ major – Largo
3. Sonata II ("Hodie mecum eris in paradiso") in C minor, ending in C major – Grave e cantabile
4. Sonata III ("Mulier, ecce filius tuus") in E major – Grave
5. Sonata IV ("Deus meus, Deus meus, utquid dereliquisti me") in F minor – Largo
6. Sonata V ("Sitio") in A major – Adagio
7. Sonata VI ("Consummatum est") in G minor, ending in G major – Lento
8. Sonata VII ("In manus tuas, Domine, commendo spiritum meum") in E♭ major – Largo
9. Il terremoto (Earthquake) in C minor – Presto e con tutta la forza

The seven meditations on the Last Words are excerpted from all four gospels. The "Earthquake" movement derives from Matthew 27:51ff. Much of the work is consolatory, but the "Earthquake" brings a contrasting element of supernatural intervention—the orchestra is asked to play presto e con tutta la forza—and closes with the only fortississimo (triple forte) in the piece.

Haydn uses an extremely wide range of tonalities for a composition of the time. Musicologist Mark Spitzer observes of this: "In its tonal freedom [it] anticipates [Haydn's] late Masses, particularly the Harmoniemesse ... The only other Classical 'multi-piece' which spreads itself across the entire tonal gamut with this architectural breadth is Beethoven's String Quartet in C♯ minor, op. 131 ... Why, then, is Beethoven given credit for experimental daring when Haydn, once again, gets there first?"

== String quartet version (1787) ==
At the request of his publisher, Artaria, the composer in 1787 produced a reduced version for string quartet: Haydn's Opus 51. This is the form in which the music is most often heard today: a group of seven works (Hoboken-Verzeichnis III/50–56), with the Introduction abutting Sonata I and Sonata VII joined by the Earthquake. The first violin part includes the Latin text directly under the notes, which "speak" the words musically.

This version has come under suspicion of authenticity due to an occasionally careless manner of transcription, with crucial wind passages left out and only the accompanimental figures in the strings retained. As a result, some quartets make their own adaptation, working from the orchestral original.

Quartets have occasionally created performances that evoked the format of the premiere, with verse readings replacing the original words and sermons. The Brentano String Quartet, for instance, commissioned poet Mark Strand to supply a series of readings to replace the "words"; the result was "Poem After the Seven Last Words" (included in the volume Man and Camel). In another recorded example, by the Aeolian Quartet in 1976, poetic readings were substituted for the "words", read by Peter Pears; these readings were from John Donne (Introduction), George Herbert (Adagio), Robert Herrick (Grave e cantabile), an anonymous 15th century writer (Grave), Edith Sitwell (Largo), Edwin Muir (Adagio) and David Gascoyne (Lento), and the final Largo and Earthquake completed the performance.

== Choral version (1796) ==
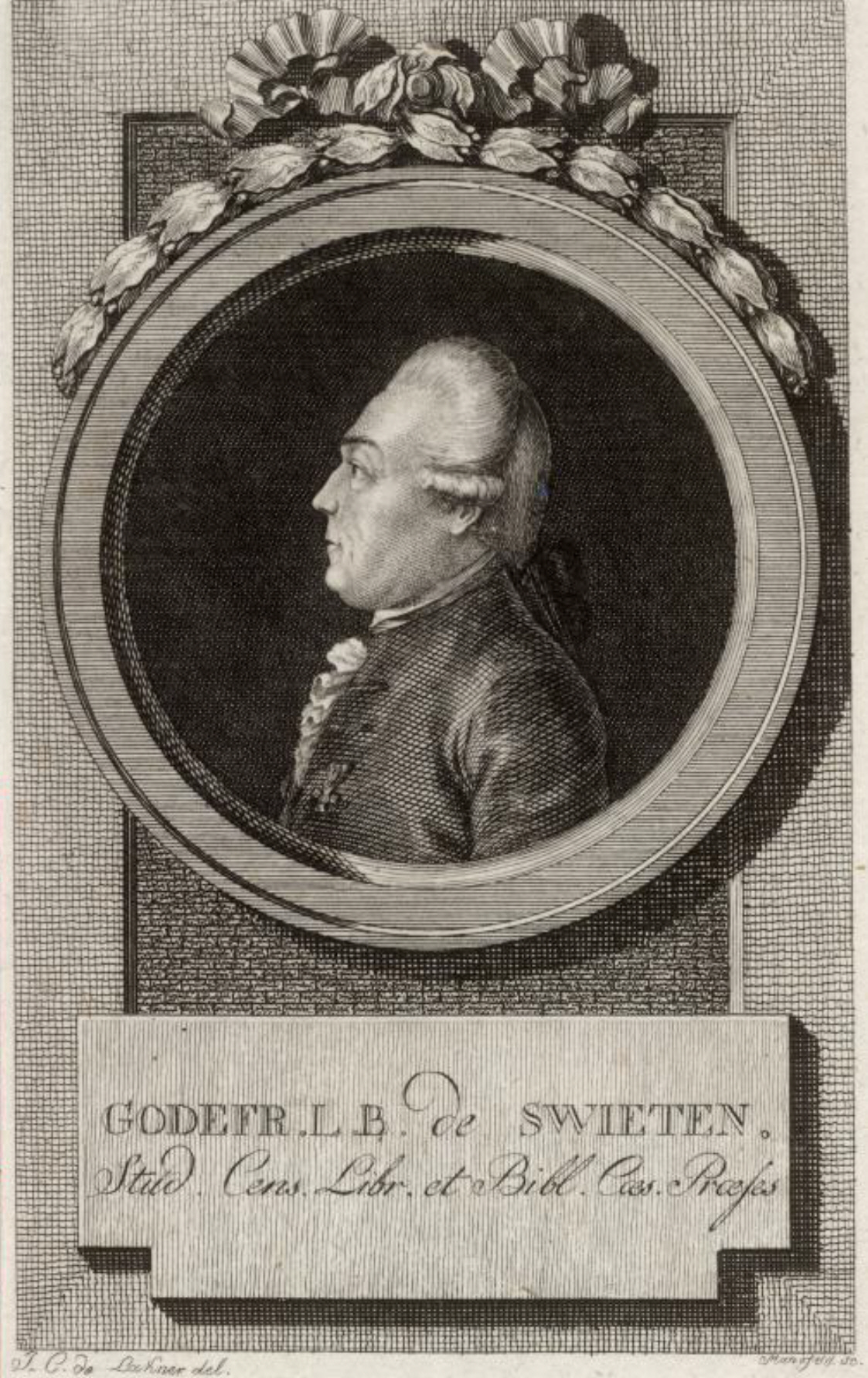
Gottfried van Swieten: engraving thought to be by Johann Georg Mansfeld, based on a drawing by J. C. Lakner

In the course of his second journey to London (1794–1795), in Passau, Haydn had heard a revised version of his work, amplified to include a chorus, prepared by the Passau Kapellmeister Joseph Friebert. The words were not the original Latin but pietist poetry, written in German. Haydn was impressed with the new work and decided to improve on it, preparing his own choral version. He had the assistance of Baron Gottfried van Swieten, who revised the lyrics used by Friebert. This was the first work in a serial collaboration with van Swieten as librettist that continued with the later oratorios The Creation and The Seasons. The choral version was privately premiered in Vienna on 26 March 1796 before an audience of the nobility, under the sponsorship of the Gesellschaft der Associierten. The public premiere was on 1 April 1798, sponsored by the Tonkünstler-Societät, a Viennese benefit society for musicians. The work was published in 1801.

== Hoboken-Verzeichnis numbering ==
The Seven Last Words of Christ has its own section in the Hoboken-Verzeichnis (Hob. XX):

- Hob. XX/1 – instrumental versions
  - Hob. XX/1A – orchestral version (1786)
  - Hob. XX/1B – quartet version (1787) = Hob. III/50–56 in the quartet section of the catalogue, also Op. 51
  - Hob. XX/1C – piano version (1787)
- Hob. XX/2 – choral version (oratorio, 1796).

== Selected discography ==
Original orchestral version (1786)

- The Seven Last Words of Christ, Le Concert des Nations, Jordi Savall. Recorded in the Oratorio de la Santa Cueva with readings by theologian Raimon Panikkar and Nobel Prize winner José Saramago. CD or DVD.
- The Seven Last Words of Christ, Vienna Philharmonic, Riccardo Muti. Recorded in concert in the Großes Festspielhaus in Salzburg on 25 August 1982. Deutsche Grammophon CD.
- The Seven Last Words of Christ, Orchestra of the Eighteenth Century, Frans Brüggen. Glossa CD, 2009.
- The Seven Last Words of Christ, Academy of St Martin in the Fields, Neville Marriner. His Master's Voice – ASD 3451. Recorded May 1977 in London, England.

String quartet version (1787)

- Haydn: The Seven Last Words of Christ, Juilliard String Quartet, Benita Valente (soprano), Jan DeGaetani (mezzo-soprano), Jon Humphrey (tenor), Thomas Paul (bass), Sony Music, 1990 (nominated for the Grammy Award for Best Chamber Music Performance in 1991)
- Haydn: String Quartet, Op. 51 Seven Last Words, The Lindsays ASV Penguin Guide Rosette
- Haydn: The Seven Last Words of Christ, Cuarteto Casals, Harmonia Mundi, 2014
- VII LW: Die Sieben letzten Worte, Matangi Quartet, Matangi Music, 2020

Piano version (1787)

- Haydn: The Seven Last Words of Our Saviour on the Cross, Hob.XX/1C (piano version) Ronald Brautigam (fortepiano) BIS

Choral version (1796)

- Haydn: The Seven Last Words of Our Saviour on the Cross, Hob.XX/2 (choral version) Sandrine Piau, Ruth Sandhoff, Robert Getchell, Harry van der Kamp. Accentus. Akademie für Alte Musik Berlin, Laurence Equilbey

== Related works ==
The opening of the overture to Étienne Méhul's 1794 opera Mélidore et Phrosine quotes the Introduction.

== Sources ==
- Geiringer, Karl; Geiringer, Irene (1982). Haydn: A Creative Life in Music (3rd ed.). University of California Press.
- Gotwals, Vernon (1968). Haydn: Two Contemporary Portraits. Milwaukee: University of Wisconsin Press – via Internet Archive. (Translation, introduction and notes, of biographies by Georg August Griesinger and Albert Christoph Dies, both from 1810.)
- Larsen, Jens Peter; Feder, Georg (1997). The New Grove Haydn. W. W. Norton. ISBN 0-393-30359-4.
- Temperley, Nicholas (1991). Haydn, The Creation. Cambridge University Press. ISBN 0-521-37865-6.
- Townsend, Pauline (1884). Joseph Haydn. Sampson Low, Marston, Searle, & Rivington.
