= Jacob Wilhelm Mechau =

German painter

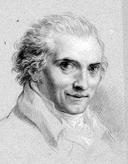
- Self-portrait (c.1800)
- Born: 16 January 1745; Leipzig
- Died: 14 March 1808 (aged 63); Dresden

Jacob Wilhelm Mechau (1745–1808) was a German landscape painter, graphic artist and etcher. His style was part of the transition from Classicism to Romanticism.

== Biography ==
His father, Daniel Simon Mechau, was an accountant for the city council. The painter, Benjamin Calau, was a boarder at his home and inspired Jacob to pursue a career in art. First, he went to Berlin, where he took private lessons from Bernhard Rode for three years, but his primary influences came from Blaise Nicholas Le Sueur and his student, Paul Joseph Bardou, at the Prussian Academy.

In 1770, he transferred to the Dresden Academy of Fine Arts and perfected his skills with its director, Giovanni Battista Casanova. He was able to stay there for almost four years before returning to Leipzig. There, he received orders for drawings from that city's numerous publishing houses, many of them made into engravings by Christian Gottlieb Geyser. To improve his work, he studied illustrating with Adam Friedrich Oeser.

In 1775, thanks to recommendations from the art historian and publisher, Christian Ludwig von Hagedorn, he was elected a member of the Hochschule für Grafik und Buchkunst (Academy of Graphics and Book Art).

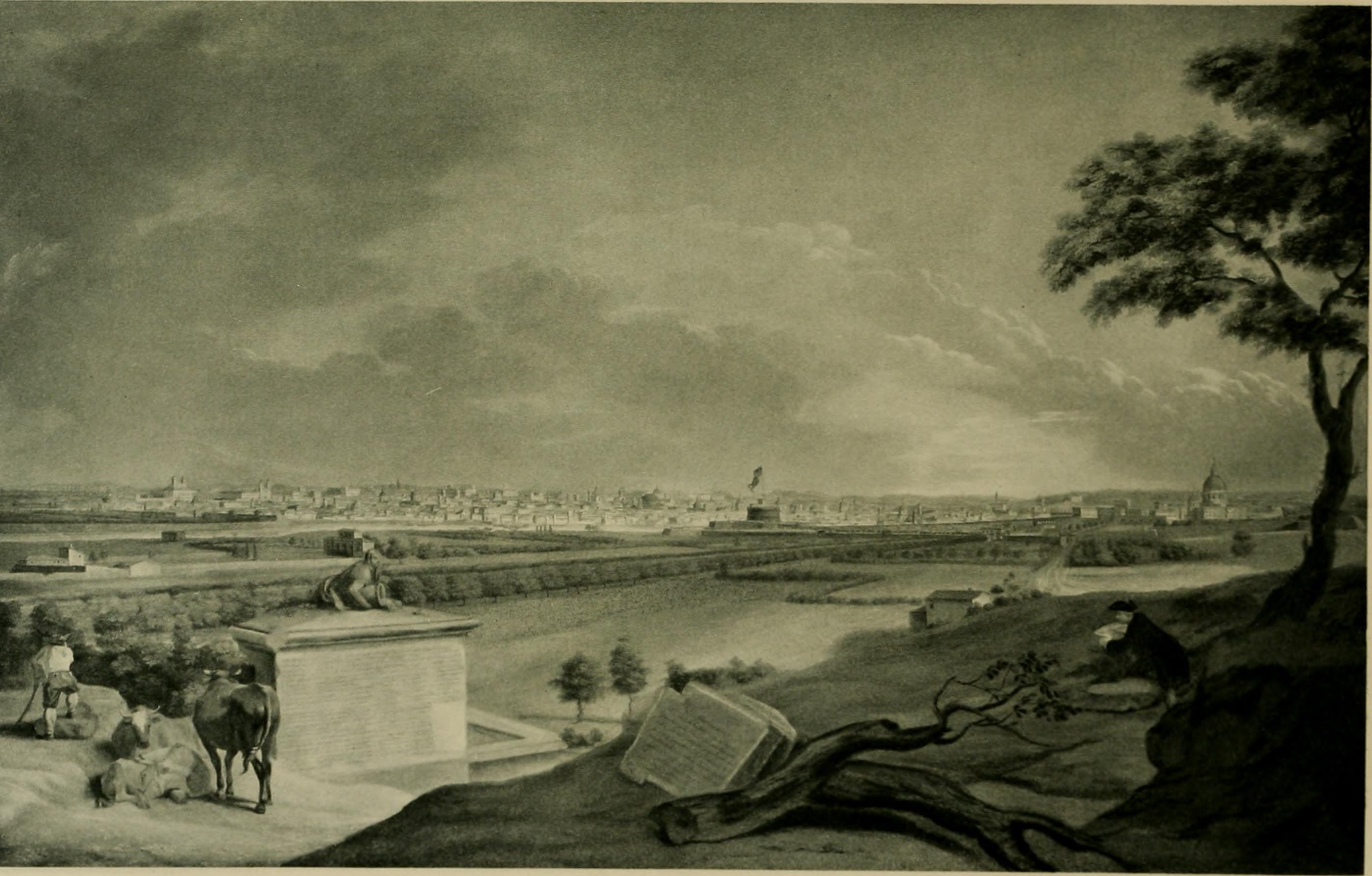
A Panorama of Rome

=== Italian journeys ===
In 1776, together with his friend and former fellow student, Heinrich Friedrich Füger, he traveled to Italy, where he made his decision to focus on landscape painting; taking Claude Lorrain and Jakob Philipp Hackert as his models. He stayed there for about four years, then returned to Leipzig. He went back to Italy in 1790, after having been denied a permanent position at the Dresden Academy.

From 1792 to 1798, he created his best-known series of etchings: Malerisch radirte Prospekte von Italien, nach der Natur gezeichnet und zu Rom radirt, consisting of 72 scenes from Rome and its surroundings. It was created in collaboration with Johann Christian Reinhart and Albert Christoph Dies; published in 1799 by Johann Friedrich Frauenholz in Nürnberg. Its views included Tivoli, Subiaco and Lake Albano.

The occupation of Italy by France in 1798 was the occasion for his final return home, to Dresden. He would live there for the remainder of his life, occupied mostly with painting landscapes of Saxony. His series of seven, exhibited in 1807, completed his transformation to Romanticism.

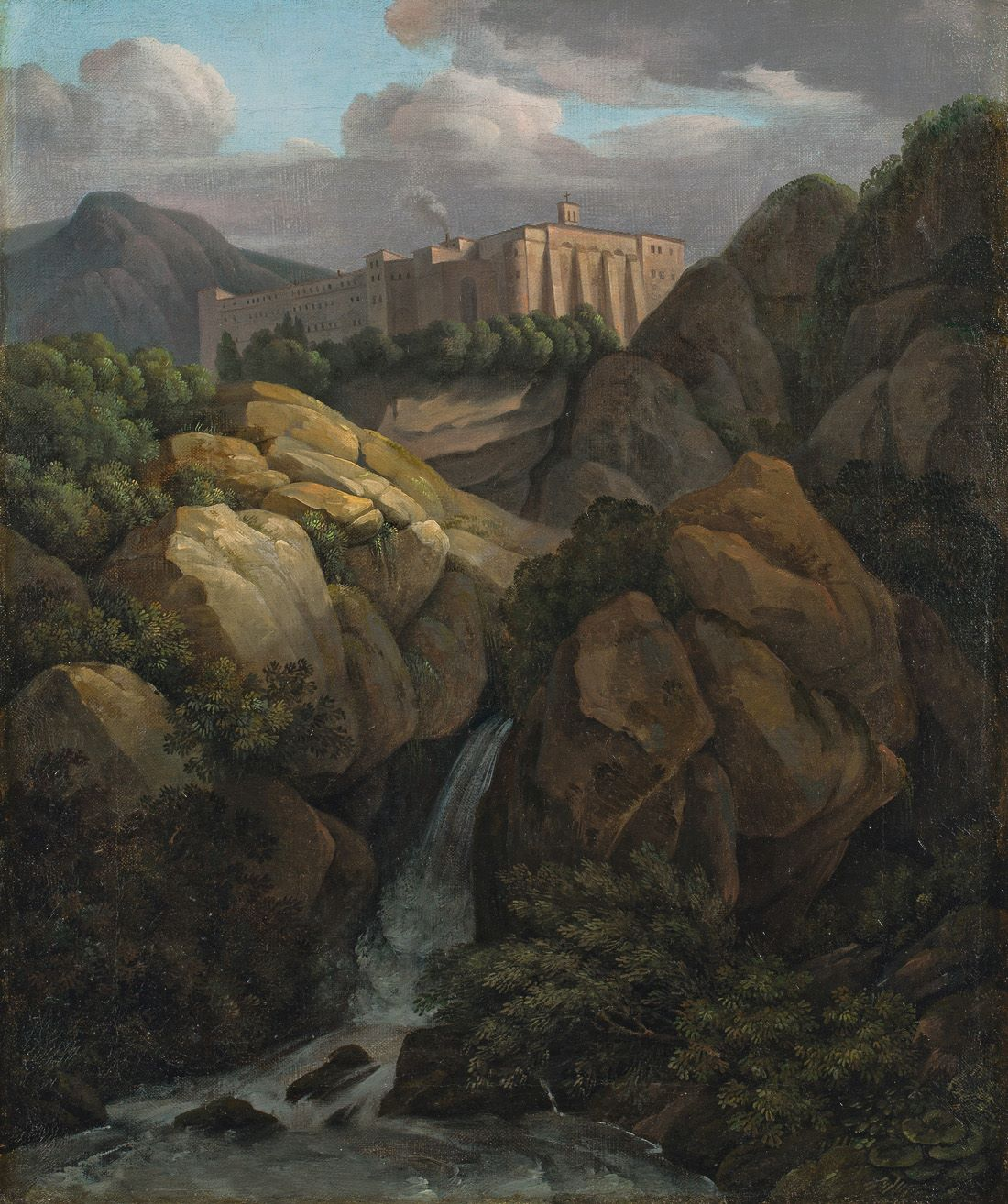
The Monastery of Santa Scholastica, near Subiaco

== Sources ==
- Mechau, Jacob Wilhelm (1885). "Mechau, Jacob Wilhelm". Allgemeine Deutsche Biographie (in German). Vol. 21. Leipzig: Duncker & Humblot. pp. 152–153. (Online @ Wikisource)
- Wolfgang Holler (1990). "Mechau, Jakob Wilhelm". Neue Deutsche Biographie (in German). Vol. 16. Berlin: Duncker & Humblot. pp. 578–579. (full text online).
- "Jacob Wilhelm Mechau" @ Sächsische Biografie
- Anke Fröhlich: „...er folgte seinem eigenen Genius...“: dem Landschaftsmaler Jakob Wilhelm Mechau (1745 - 1808) zum 200. Geburtstag, in: Dresdener Kunstblätter, Vol.52, München 2008, ISSN 0418-0615
- Christina Schwichtenberg-Winkler: Die „Collection ou suite pittoresque de l'Italie dessinées d'après nature et gravées à l'eau forte a Rome par trois peintres allemands A. C. Dies, Charles Reinhart, Jacques Mechau“, 1792 -98, 1799 : das Pittoreske und die römische Vedute um 1800, Diss., Aachen 1992
