= Ann Hallenberg =

Swedish mezzo-soprano (born 1967)

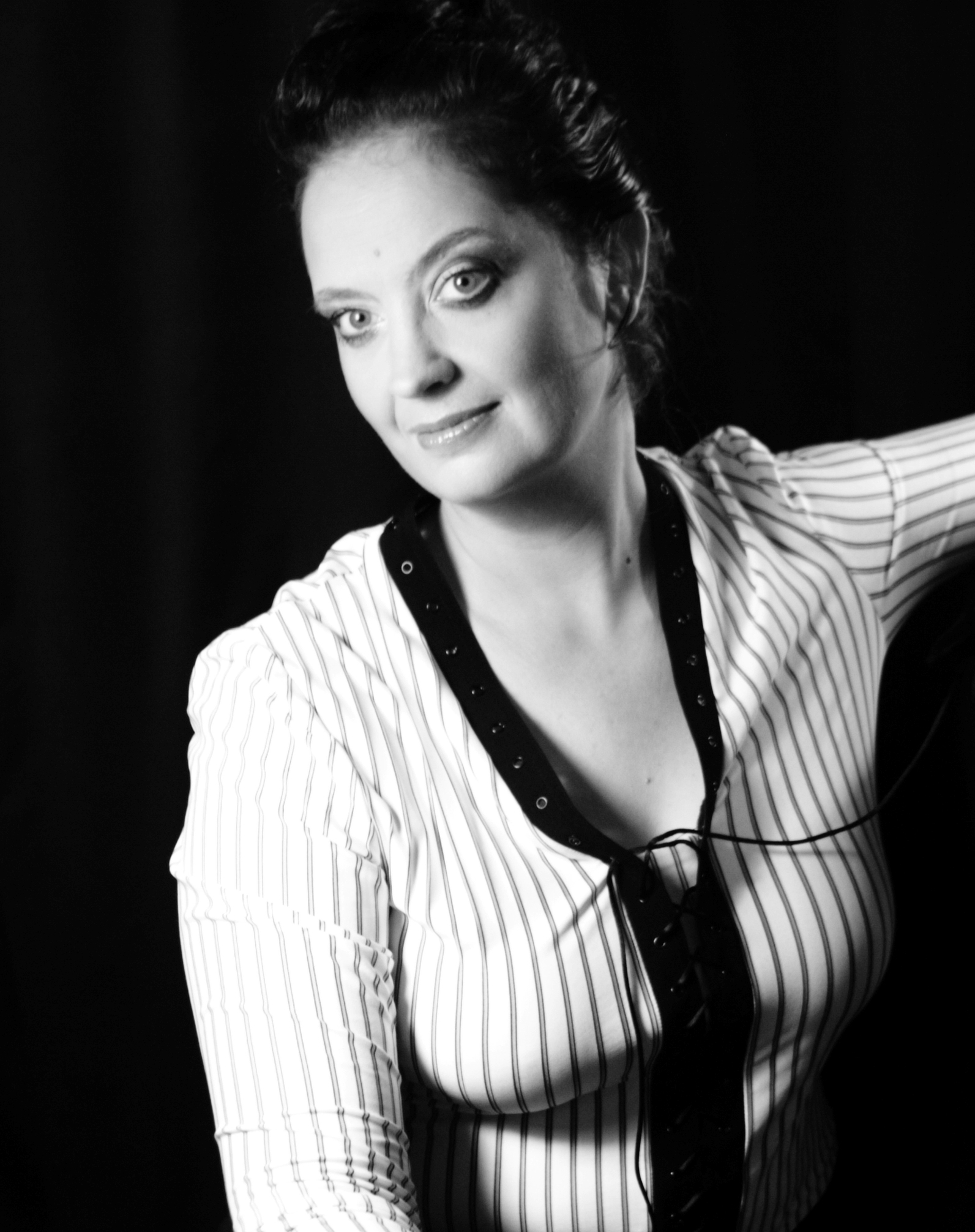
- Born: 1967 or 1968
- Education: Royal College of Music, Stockholm
- Occupation: Operatic mezzo-soprano
- Title: Hovsångerska

Ann Hallenberg (born 1967 or 1968) is a Swedish mezzo-soprano. She has an operatic career on the stage and concert platform around Europe. She regularly appears in major opera houses and festivals, in roles by Rossini, Mozart, Gluck, Handel, Vivaldi, Monteverdi, and Purcell.

Hallenberg studied at the Royal College of Music, Stockholm, with Kerstin Meyer and Erik Saedén; she undertook further study in London with Joy Mammen. Early roles included Fulgenzia in Donizetti's Il fortunato inganno at the Vadstena Academy in 1995 and Aristaeus in Rossi's Orfeo in Drottningholm in 1997, returning in 2001 as Cornelia in Handel's Giulio Cesare.

The mezzo-soprano was made artist in residence at Drottningholm for 2019 and 2020, and decided on the repertoire; in the first year it was Ariodante conducted by Ian Page. In 2021 she was appointed as Hovsångerska by the King of Sweden.

Hallenberg has sung Handel's music extensively, including a number of collaborations with Alan Curtis.

== Recordings ==
- Carnevale 1729. Ann Hallenberg, Stefano Montanari, Il Pomo d'Oro. PENTATONE PTC 5186678 (2017). OCLC 1104139151
- Recital – Arias for Marietta Marcolini, Rossini's first muse, Stavanger Symphony Orchestra, Fabio Biondi OCLC 980602832
- Brahms Alto Rhapsody. Philippe Herreweghe, Phi. OCLC 1180343594
- Franz Waxman, Joshua. James Sedares, DG. OCLC 989978426
- Haydn Il ritorno di Tobia, Andreas Spering, Naxos. OCLC 1189331546
- Vivaldi Il Farnace, Diego Fasolis, Virgin Classics. OCLC 754117668
- Vivaldi Orlando furioso, Christophe Spinosi, Naive. OCLC 163337291
- Handel Imeneo, Capella Augustina, Andreas Spering. cpo 2002 OCLC 938755228
- Handel Tolomeo, Alan Curtis, DG. OCLC 938771308

=== DVD ===
- Handel Ariodante Il Complesso Barocco, Alan Curtis OCLC 1547483145
- Handel Serse OCLC 753715474
