= Albert Christoph Dies =

German artist and biographer (1755–1822)

- Born: Hanover, Electorate of Hanover, Kingdom of Great Britain
- Baptised: 11 February 1755
- Died: 28 December 1822 (aged 66–67); Vienna, Austrian Empire
- Notable work: Biographische Nachrichten von Joseph Haydn
- Children: Johannes

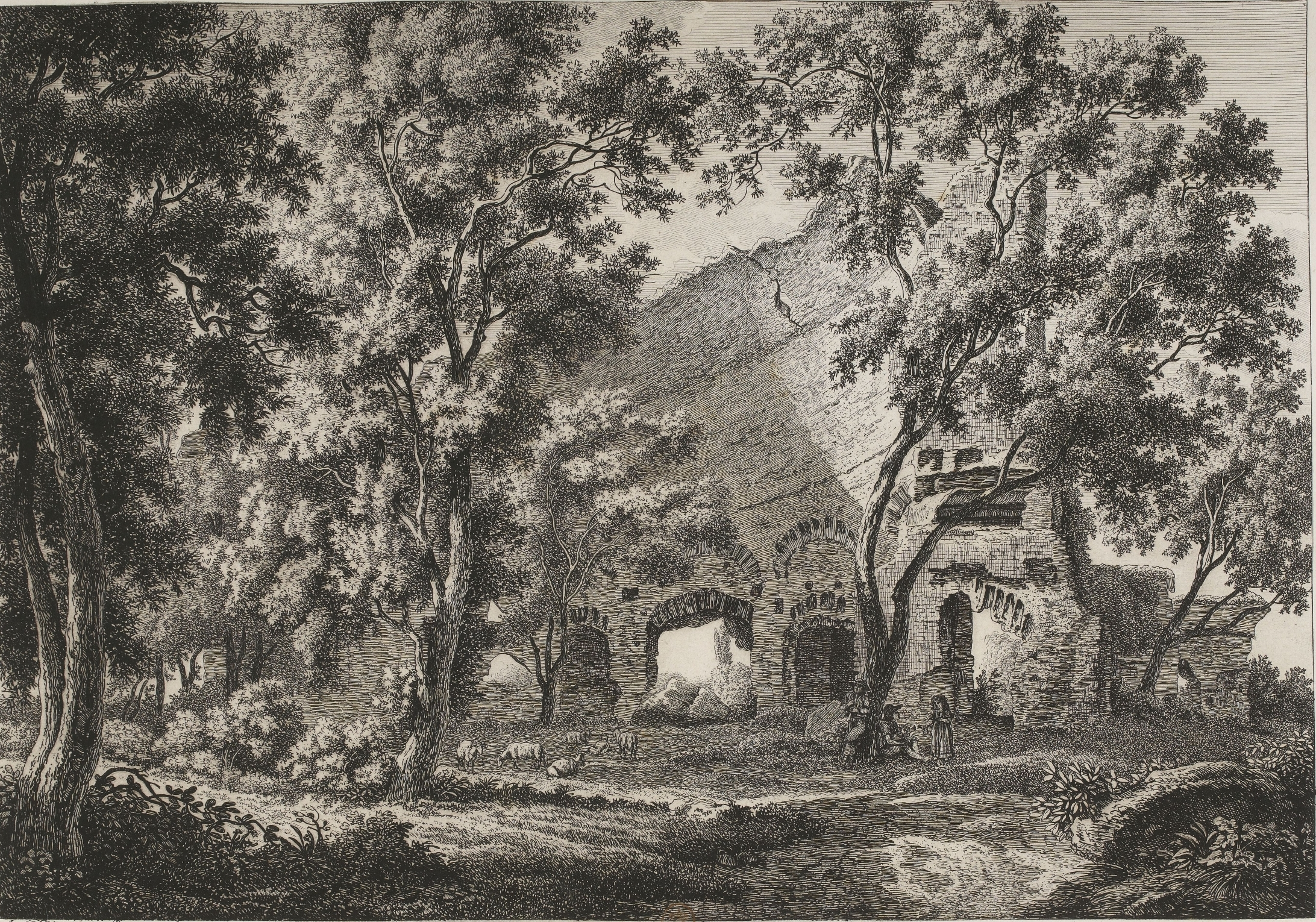
Illustration from Collection de vues pittoresques de l'Italie

Albert Christoph Dies (1755 – 28 December 1822) was a German painter, engraver, and biographer most noted for his biography of Joseph Haydn, although it is now considered sentimental and not entirely accurate. As an artist, he is also not very well-regarded.

== As painter ==
Dies was born in Hanover (baptized 11 February 1755), and began his studies there. For one year he studied in the academy of Düsseldorf, and then he started at the age of twenty with thirty ducats in his pocket for Rome, studying briefly on the way in Mannheim and Basel. In Rome he lived a frugal life till 1796; his son Johannes (Giovanni) was born there in 1776. Copying pictures, chiefly by Salvator Rosa, for a livelihood, his taste led him to draw and paint from nature in Tivoli, Albano and other picturesque places in the vicinity of Rome. Naples, the birthplace of his favorite master, he visited more than once for the same reasons.

Goethe visited him in 1787. The poet, interested in the theory of color, reported in his Zweiter römischer Aufenthalt (transl. Second stay in Rome), "At the moment I am engaged in something from which I learn a great deal; I have found and sketched a landscape that a clever artist, Dies, colored in my presence; thus eyes and mind grow ever more accustomed to color and harmony."

During the Rome visit, Dies also composed music, though later on he apparently destroyed all that he had written, and none of it survives today.

At one point, Jacques-Louis David, then composing his Oath of the Horatii (1784) at Rome, wished to take him to Paris. But Dies had reasons for not accepting the offer. He was courting a young Roman whom he subsequently married. Meanwhile, he had made the acquaintance of the engraver Giovanni Volpato, for whom he executed numerous drawings, and this no doubt suggested the plan, which he afterwards carried out, of publishing, in partnership with Jacob Wilhelm Mechau, Johann Christian Reinhart and Johann Friedrich Frauenholz, the series of plates known as the Collection de vues pittoresques de l'Italie, published in seventy-two sheets at Nuremberg in 1799.

According to Gotwals, "In May, 1796, Dies apparently eloped with a young girl to Salzburg." The following year he moved to Vienna, and lived there on the produce of his brush as a landscape painter, and on that of his pencil or graver as a draughtsman and etcher. He also taught landscape painting at the Imperial and Royal Academy, and later, in his final post, was gallery director to Prince Nikolaus Esterházy II. During this time his physical condition grew worse, and he even lost the use of one of his hands.

== As biographer ==
Dies was a great admirer of the music of Joseph Haydn and during his Vienna years he undertook to meet the composer and write his biography. He obtained an introduction from his fellow artist Anton Grassi, who had made a number of busts of Haydn. Over the course of three years during Haydn's old age (starting 15 April 1805, ending 8 August 1808), Dies made a series of 30 visits to the frail and ailing composer, even though Haydn was convinced no one would be interested in his life story. On a number of occasions Haydn was unable to see him, but frequently Dies was admitted and was able to interview him. In 1810, one year after Haydn's death, Dies published a biography based on what he learned in his visits (see References below). This work is organized around the sequence of visits, reporting each in turn. It continues to serve as a substantial source of information on the composer's life.

Compared with another biography written at the same time by Georg August Griesinger, Dies's work is almost certainly less accurate and is more likely to have been sentimentalized and embellished. For instances of probable embellishment, see Mathias Haydn and Haydn and Mozart; for an apparent outright blunder, see Rebecca Schroeter. Dies's translator Vernon Gotwals, comparing Dies to Griesinger, concludes:

It is now clear that for facts about Haydn one will turn first to the Biographische Notizen of Griesinger, but that reliance upon that source alone would deprive Haydn's portrait of many authentic details, mixed inescapably with some imaginary ones. Dies's Biographische Nachrichten is the work of a sentimental artist who fancied himself a "universal man" but whose approach to the problem of biography was that of his time and place.

== Death ==
In 1787, he accidentally swallowed three-quarters of an ounce (20 g) of lead acetate. He never recovered from the ensuing lead poisoning, which caused the loss of use of one of his hands, and eventually died in Vienna on 28 December 1822.

== Assessment ==
Dies is perhaps better known today from his acquaintanceship (e.g. Goethe, Haydn) than from his own merits as an artist or writer.

The Encyclopædia Britannica Eleventh Edition gives harsh opinions of Dies's work as an artist:

- "[In Rome] he became a bold executant in water-colours and in oil, though he failed to acquire any originality of his own."
- "Lord Bristol, who encouraged him as a copyist, predicted that he would be a second Salvator Rosa. However, Dies did not have the creativity necessary to become a great artist."
- "With so many irons in the fire Dies naturally lost the power of concentration."
- "From two pictures now in the Belvedere gallery, and from numerous engraved drawings from the neighborhood of Tivoli, we gather that Dies was never destined to rise above a respectable mediocrity. He followed Salvator Rosa's example in imitating the manner of Claude Lorrain. But Salvator adapted the style of Claude, whilst Dies did no more than copy it."

Gotwals writes, "Friedrich Noack in his article in the Thieme and Becker Allgemeines Lexicon der bildenden Künstler ["General lexicon of graphic artists"], describes Dies's work as clumsy, mediocre, and prosaic.

Gotwals adds, concerning Dies's writing, that "his literary style is hardly better."

== Gallery ==
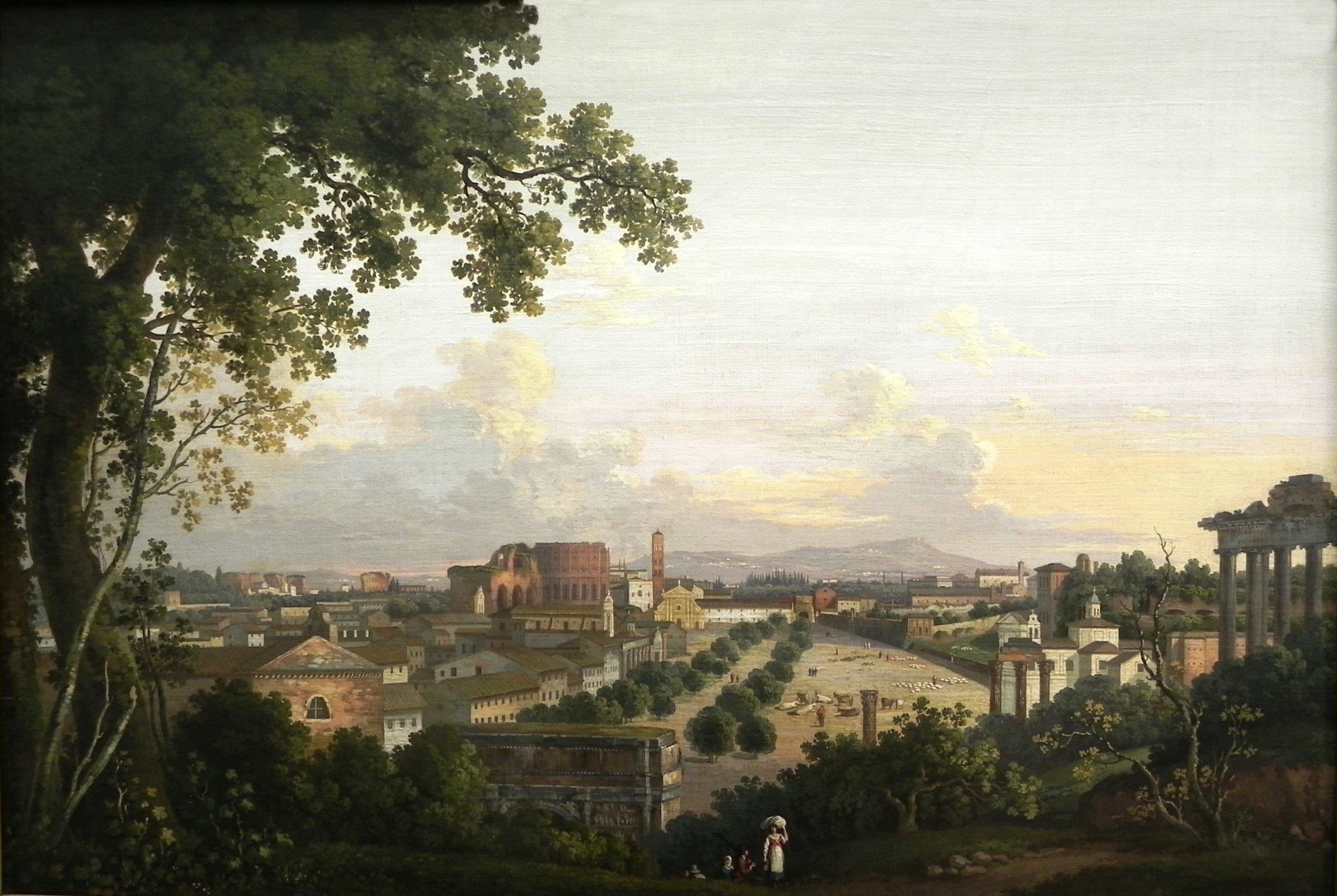
The Roman Forum (1787) (Note: The Roman Forum was unexcavated at the time Dies portrayed it.)

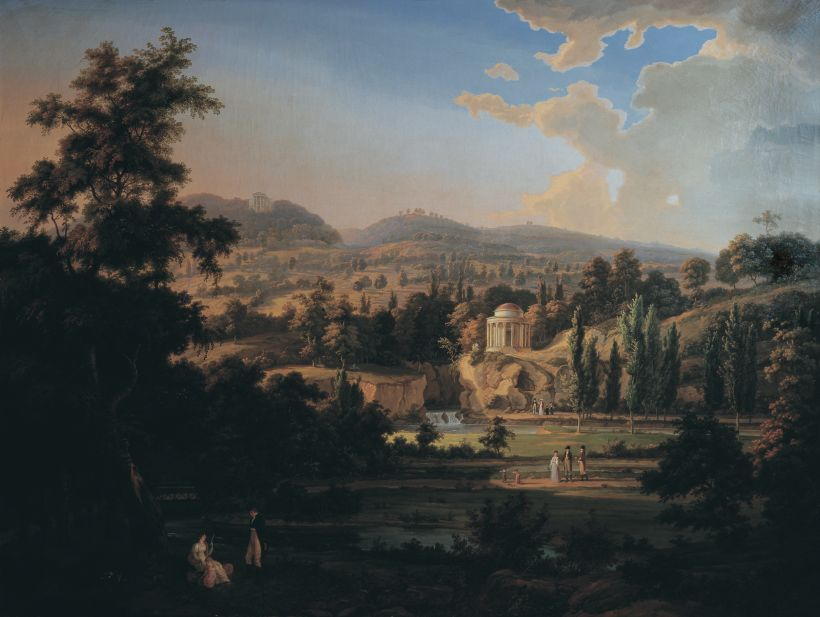
View of the Leopoldinentempel (1807) (Note: This view of the gardens to the rear of the Esterházy Palace still exists today, though the hills are more thickly wooded. Oil on canvas, possession of the Esterházy family, Burgenland, Austria.)

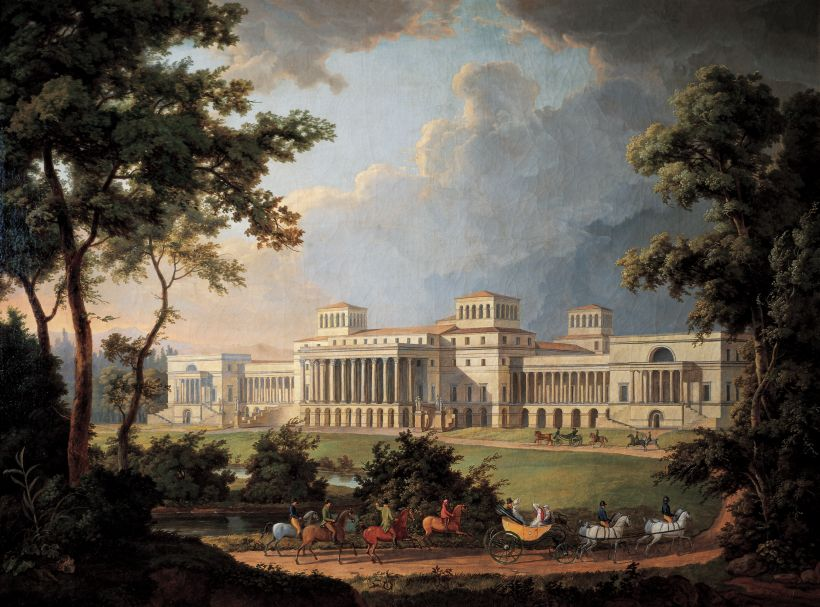
Garden Façade, Esterházy Palace (1812) (Note: This is a planned garden facade of the Esterházy Palace, which would have converted the rear of the building (facing the view seen above) to a new front entrance. The profligate Prince Nicolaus, who planned the addition, ran out of money and only the central series of columns was ever built. Oil on canvas, possession of the Esterházy family, Burgenland, Austria.)

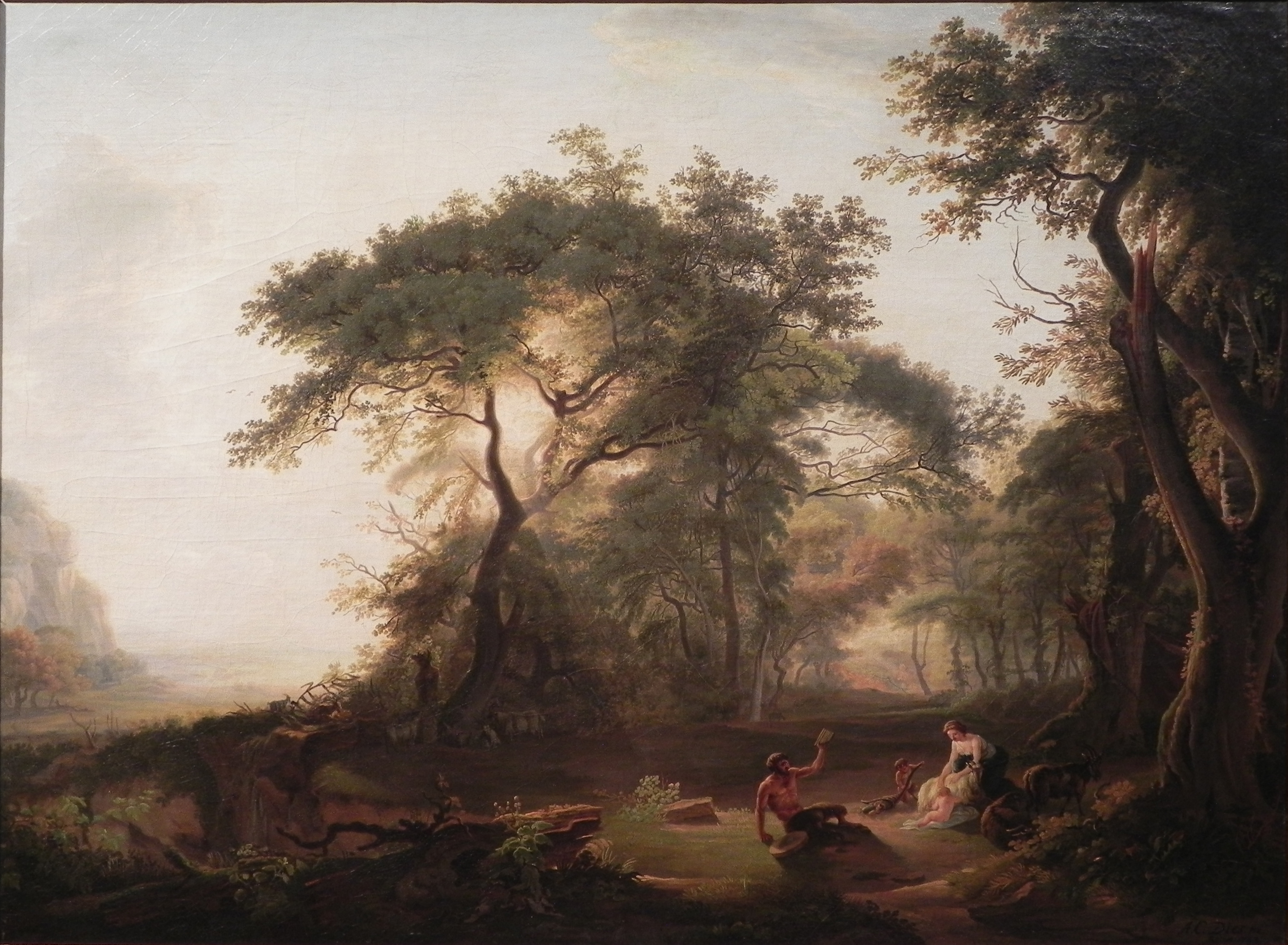
Landscape with the raising of Jupiter

== See also ==
- List of German painters
