= Oratorio de la Santa Cueva =

Coordinates: 36.5335°N 6.2954°W

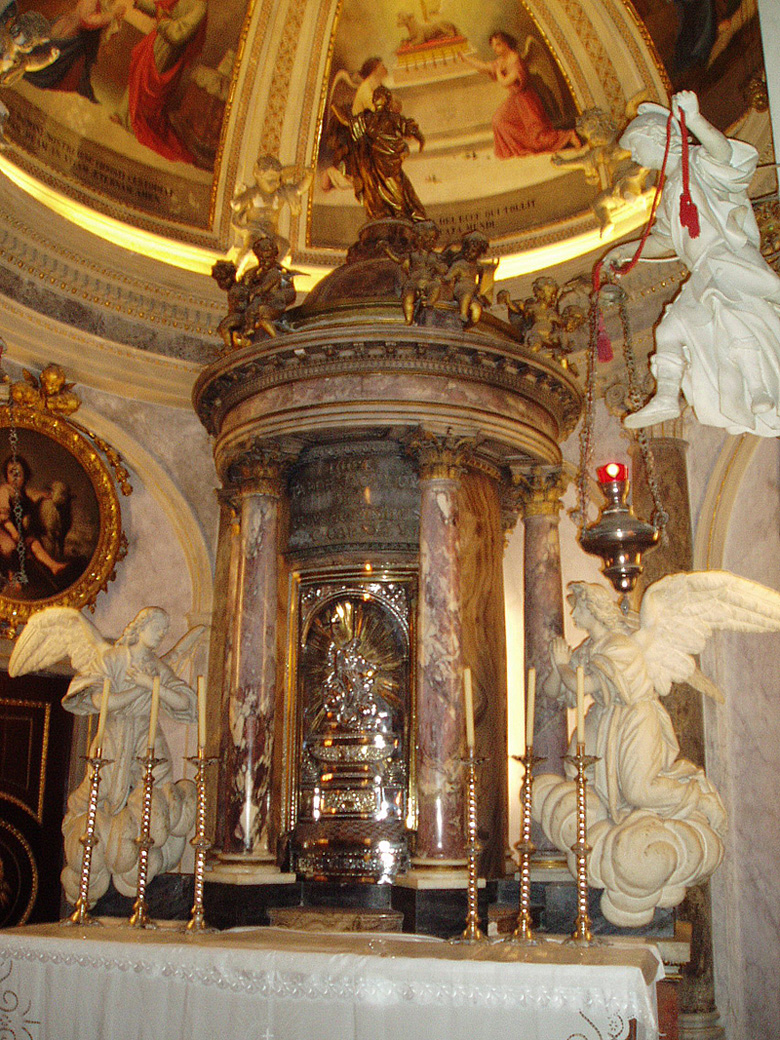
Oratorio de la Santa Cueva in Cádiz

The Oratorio de la Santa Cueva is a church composed of two oratories, one superimposed above the other, adjacent to the Holy Rosary church in Cádiz.

It was restored by the Veracruz-born priest, Don José Sáenz de Santa María, who also commissioned Haydn's The Seven Last Words of Christ for performance in the lower chapel.
