= Michael von Puchberg =

Johann Michael von Puchberg (September 21, 1741, Zwettl, Lower Austria – January 21, 1822, Vienna) was a textile merchant who lived in Vienna in the 18th and early 19th centuries. He is remembered as a friend of Wolfgang Amadeus Mozart whom he lent considerable sums of money during a difficult period in the composer's life.

== The loans to Mozart ==
Around 1788, Mozart's financial situation had worsened; it was in general a bad time for musicians in Vienna, owing to the war with Turkey that began the previous year; Mozart biographers also often blame imprudent financial lifestyle decisions made by the Mozart family. Mozart wrote to Puchberg a series of "begging letters," of increasing desperate tone. Puchberg responded with a series of loans, ranging in size from 30 to 300 florins, and totalling about 1400 florins.

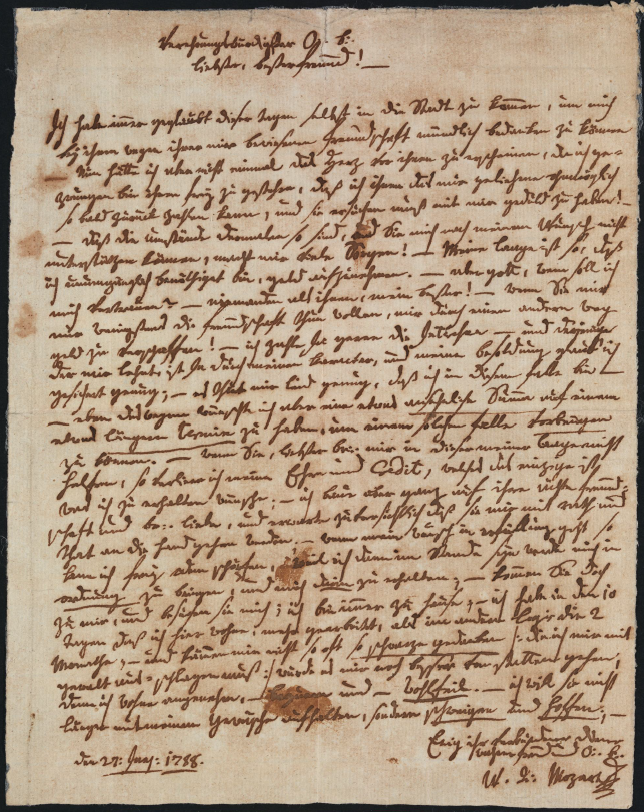

Andrew Steptoe (1984) has discussed the series of 21 letters Mozart wrote to Puchberg asking for loans. He notes that "Mozart's early requests stress the bond of mutual aid and comfort," giving the following example:

I have now opened my whole heart to you in a matter which is of the utmost importance to me; that is, I have acted as a true brother. But it is only with a true brother that one can be perfectly frank. And now I look forward eagerly to your reply, which I do hope will be favourable . . . I take you to be a man who ... will like myself certainly assist a friend, if he be a true friend, or his brother, if he be indeed a brother. [letter of 17 June 1788]

"Over the next year," Steptoe adds, "Mozart's tone changed to desperation:"

Great God! I would not wish my worst enemy to be in my present position. And if you, most beloved friend and brother, forsake me, we are altogether lost, both my unfortunate and blameless self and my poor sick wife and child. [letter of 12 July 1789]

Steptoe continues: "At times, the composer's self-respect deserted him completely, as he begged for pittances:"

In a week or fortnight I shall be better off--certainly--but at present I am in want! Can you not help me out with a trifle? The smallest sum would be very welcome just now. [letter of 14 August 1790]

However, in 2009 the musicologist Michael Lorenz showed that at the time when Mozart pretended to be in dire straits, he had certainly not reduced his expenses (as claimed in one of his letters to Puchberg), but lived in a spacious apartment on the Alsergrund that cost him 250 florins a year. At that time he also owned a carriage and a horse. Thus there is a good case to assume that Mozart might have vastly exaggerated his financial problems just to get money from Puchberg.

== The fate of Puchberg's loans ==
By 1791 Mozart's financial conditions had improved slightly, and he made at least a start on repaying the loans. The rest of the money was not paid off until several years after his premature death (on December 5, 1791); his widow Constanze had become an effective businesswoman, making money from memorial concerts and publications, and was finally able to pay Puchberg back.

== Other connections to Mozart ==
Like Mozart, Puchberg was a Freemason; see Mozart and Freemasonry.

According to Keefe (2006), Mozart wrote for him "either the Piano Trio in E, K. 542 (1788) or the [Divertimento for] String Trio in E flat, K. 563 (1788)."

== Puchberg and Haydn ==
Puchberg was also a friend of Joseph Haydn. The two were the only people that Mozart invited to attend the rehearsals of Così fan tutte in 1790. Puchberg was the person that Haydn wrote to from London, distraught, when he heard the news of Mozart's death; see Haydn and Mozart.
