= Linda Zoghby =

American operatic soprano (born 1949)

- Born: August 17, 1949 (age 75); Mobile, Alabama, U.S.
- Origin: Mobile
- Occupation: Singer
- Years active: 1973–Present

Linda Zoghby (born August 17, 1949) is an American operatic soprano.

Zoghby was born in Mobile, Alabama, and began her vocal studies under Elena Nikolaidi at Florida State University. Her professional debut came in 1973 at Chicago's Grant Park Music Festival, following which she made her stage debut at Houston Grand Opera as Donna Elvira in 1975; thereafter she sang opera in venues around the United States, including New York City; Washington, D.C.; Dallas; Santa Fe; and New Orleans. On January 19, 1982, she made her Metropolitan Opera debut in La bohème by stepping in at the last minute for Teresa Stratas as Mimì, a performance which won her many critical plaudits. She sang the role thirteen times during her Met career; the only other role which she essayed at the house was Ilia in Idomeneo, which she performed five times. Internationally, Zoghby appeared at the Glyndebourne Festival as Mimì and as Aminta in La fedeltà premiata by Joseph Haydn. Other roles for which she was known include Pamina and Marguerite in Faust. During her career she also appeared in performance at the White House, and recorded a number of operas by Haydn.

Zoghby is married with three children. A resident of Mobile, she teaches voice at the University of South Alabama.

== Discography ==
- Haydn: L'Isola Disabitata with the Orchestre de Chambre de Lausanne (Phillips, 1977)
- Haydn: L'Incontro Improvviso with the Orchestre de Chambre de Lausanne (Phillips, 1980)
- Haydn: Il Ritorno Di Tobia with the Royal Philharmonic Orchestra and the Brighton Festival Chorus (Decca, 1994)
