= Davide penitente =

Cantata composed by Wolfgang Amadeus Mozart

- Cantata by W. A. Mozart
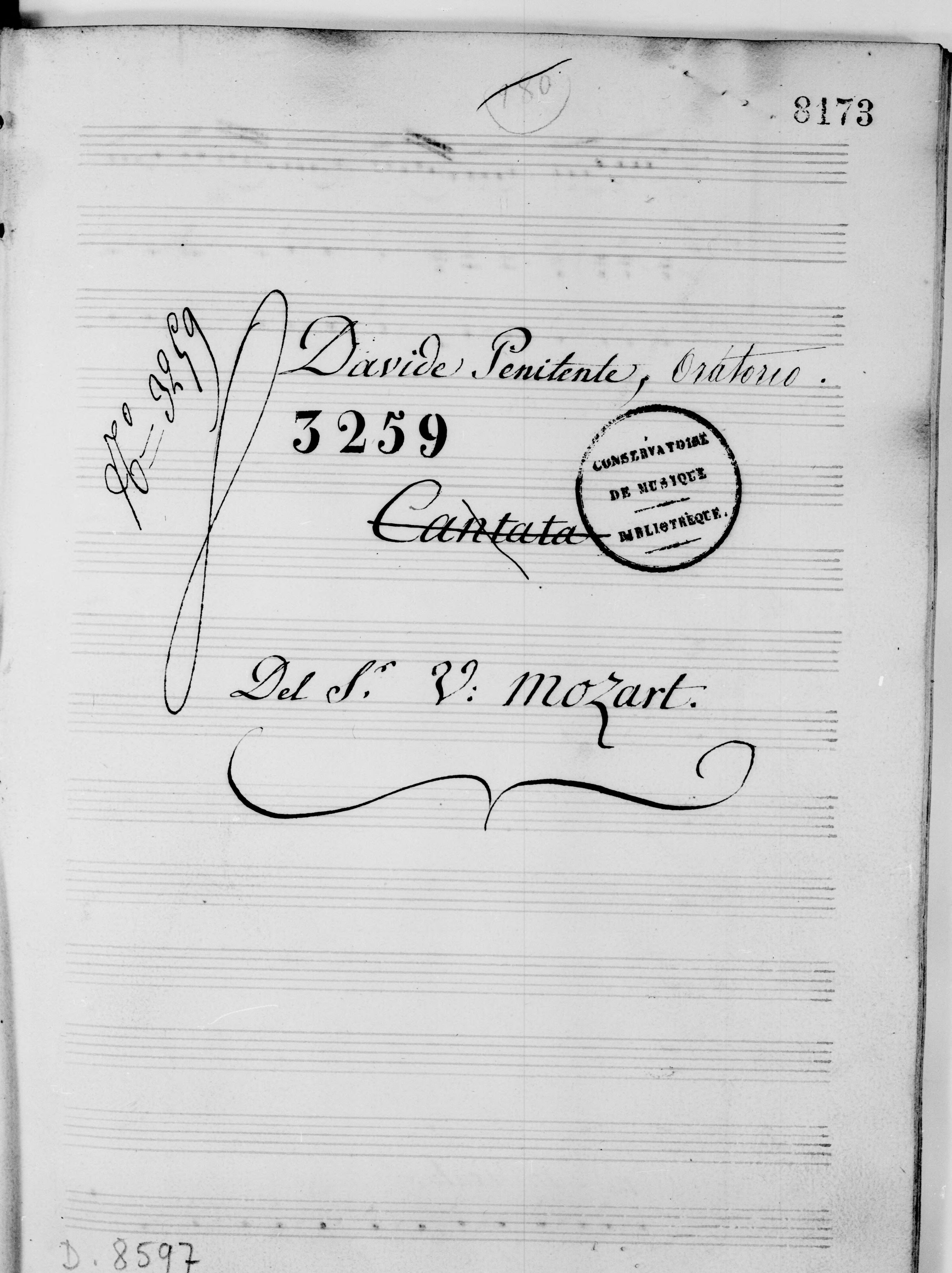
- Title page of a concert score. Another hand has crossed out 'cantata' and written in 'Oratorio'.
- Catalogue: K. 469
- Related: Great Mass in C minor
- Text: Saverio Mattei
- Language: Italian
- Based on: Psalms, First Book of Samuel
- Composed: 13 March 1785: Burgtheater, Vienna
- Vocal: SATB chorus; soprano I and II, tenor soloists
- Instrumental: orchestra

Davide penitente, K. 469 (Italian: 'David the Penitent'; also spelled Davidde penitente), is a cantata by Wolfgang Amadeus Mozart, to texts by Saverio Mattei (1742–95). The cantata was commissioned by the Wiener Tonkünstler-Societät, and first performed on 13 March 1785 in the Vienna Burgtheater. Most of the music is derived from the unfinished Great Mass in C minor, K. 427 (1782–83), although two arias ("A te, fra tanti affanni" and "Fra l'oscure ombre funeste") and a cadenza for the last movement ("Chi in Dio sol spera") were newly composed for the work.

It has a duration of approximately 45 minutes.

== Authorship of text ==
The theme of the work is based on the Psalms and the First Book of Samuel of the Old Testament. The text was previously attributed to Lorenzo Da Ponte, following a report by Vincent Novello. However, it is now known that the text is taken from Italian translations of the Psalms by Saverio Mattei.

== Structure ==
1. Alzai le flebili voci al Signor (Andante moderato: Chorus)
2. Cantiamo le glorie e le lodi (Allegro vivace: Chorus)
3. Aria: Lungi le cure ingrate (Allegro aperto: Soprano II)
4. Sii pur sempre benigno (Adagio: Chorus)
5. Duet: Sorgi, o Signore, e spargi i tuoi nemici (Allegro moderato: Sopranos I and II)
6. Aria: A te, fra tanti affanni – Udisti i voti miei (Andante – Allegro: Tenor)
7. Se vuoi, puniscimi (Largo: Double choir)
8. Aria: Fra l'oscure ombre funeste – Alme belle (Andante – Allegro: Soprano)
9. Terzetto: Tutte le mie speranze (Allegro: Sopranos I and II, Tenor)
10. Chi in Dio sol spera (Adagio: Chorus) – Di tal pericoli non ho timor (Chorus)

== Recordings ==
- 1990 – Krisztina Laki, Nicole Fallien, Hans Peter Blochwitz – Nederlands Kamerkoor, La Petite Bande, Sigiswald Kuijken – CD Deutsche Harmonia Mundi
- 2006 - Gloriae Dei Cantores, Elizabeth Patterson, Vox Caeli Sinfonia, Richard Pugsley - CD Gloriae Dei Cantores
