= Il ritorno di Tobia =

1775 oratorio by Joseph Haydn

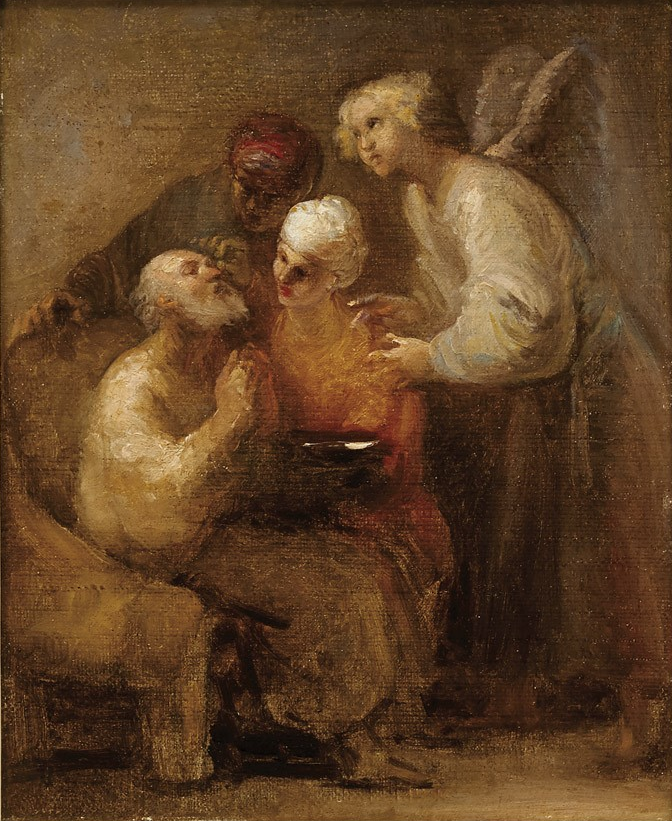
Tobit Heals His Father's Blindness, by Domingos Sequeira

Il ritorno di Tobia (The Return of Tobias) is an oratorio in two parts composed in 1775 by Joseph Haydn (Hob. XXI:1). The work is the first oratorio the composer wrote and, according to Jones, was "his most extended and ambitious composition up to that time".

The Italian-language libretto of the work is by Giovanni Gastone Boccherini, brother of the composer Luigi Boccherini. This libretto is harshly criticized by Olleson, who notes that the author de-dramatizes vivid episodes in the source (the story of Tobit in the Apocrypha), depriving Haydn of the opportunity for highly dramatic musical utterance.

The work was premiered in Vienna on 2 April 1775, under the sponsorship of the Tonkünstler-Societät, a musician's benevolent society. The musical forces were substantial: Smither writes: "characteristic of the large forces used for the Tonkünstler-Societät concerts, the orchestra, chorus, and soloists possibly numbered more than 180 performers." He adds that the premiere was "enormously successful."

In 1784, Haydn substantially revised the work, with cuts to make numbers shorter and provide two new choruses ("Ah, gran Dio" and "Svanisce in un momento"), for another of the Tonkünstler-Societät's benefit concerts. It is thought that at this concert Haydn first met Wolfgang Amadeus Mozart, who became his good friend. One of the soprano soloists was Nancy Storace, also a friend of Haydn, who later was Mozart's first Susanna in The Marriage of Figaro. "Svanisce in un momento", called "Der Sturm", was reworked in the sacred motet "Insanae et vanae curae".

In 1808 the oratorio made a third appearance on the program of the Tonkünstler-Societät, this time in a revised version by the now-elderly composer's pupil, Sigismund Neukomm. The performance on the night of 22 December, which required the labors of most of the highly qualified musicians in Vienna, had regrettable consequences for a now-famous rival concert taking place in Vienna on the same evening, the benefit for Ludwig van Beethoven that premiered his Fifth and Sixth Symphonies.

Today, Il ritorno di Tobia is eclipsed by Haydn's later works in this genre – The Creation and The Seasons – and is seldom performed or recorded.

== Setting ==
Soloists:

- Tobia (tenor)
- Anna, Tobia's mother (alto)
- Tobit, Tobia's father (bass)
- Sara, Tobia's wife (soprano)
- Raffaele, an angel (soprano)

Hebrew choir (SATB) and orchestra

The venue of the event is the Tobias parents' house in Nineveh.

== Recordings ==
- 1975 – Magda Kalmár (Raffaelle), Veronika Kincses (Sara), Klára Takács (Anna), Attila Fülöp (Tobia), Zsolt Bende (Tobit) – Budapest Madrigal Choir, Budapest State Orchestra, Ferenc Szekeres – 4 LPs/3 CDs (Hungaroton)
- 1980 – Barbara Hendricks (Raffaelle), Linda Zoghby (Sara), Della Jones (Anna), Philip Langridge (Tobia), Benjamin Luxon (Tobit) – Brighton Festival Chorus, Royal Philharmonic Orchestra, Antal Doráti – 4 LPs/3 CDs (Decca Records)
- 2006 – Roberta Invernizzi (Raffaelle), Sophie Karthäuser (Sara), Ann Hallenberg (Anna), Anders J. Dahlin (Tobia), Nikolay Borchev (Tobit) – VokalEnsemble Köln, Capella Augustina, Andreas Spering – 3 CDs (Naxos)
