= Elena Nikolaidi =

American opera singer

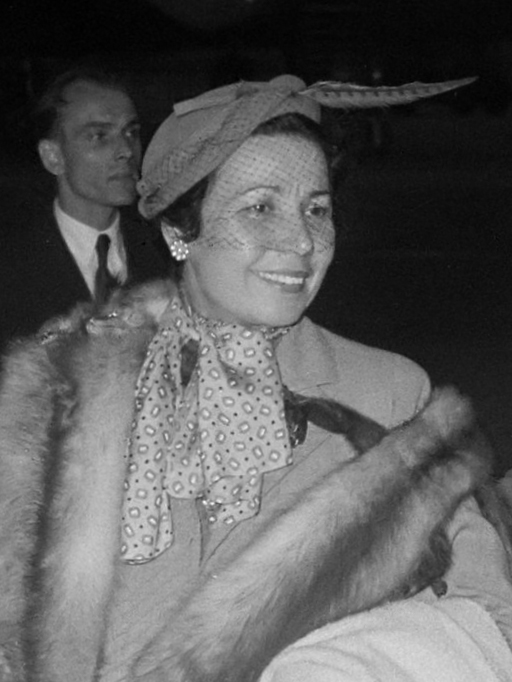
Elena Nikolaidi (1953)

Elena Nikolaidi (Greek: Έλενα Νικολαΐδη; June 15, 1909 – November 14, 2002) was a Greek-American opera singer and teacher. She sang leading contralto and mezzosoprano roles with major opera companies worldwide and made numerous recordings.

Her birth year is given as 1906 in some sources.

== Early life and musical study ==
Elena Nikolaidi was born in Smyrna, Ottoman Empire, (which is now İzmir, Turkey). In 1922, after the invasion of Turkey in Smyrna, she moved with her family to Greece. She studied voice on scholarship at the Athens Conservatoire under Thanos Mellos. She made her debut with orchestra in Athens in a performance conducted by Dimitris Mitropoulos. Her first stage appearance was in the premiere of The Ghost Bridge by Theophrastos Sakellaridis.

Nikolaidi married Mellos, her voice instructor, in 1936. However, she would retain "Elena Nikolaidi" as her professional name.

== Career ==
In 1936, Nikolaidi traveled to Vienna to compete in the Belvedere vocal competition. She placed fourth but earned a second hearing with the great conductor Bruno Walter, which resulted in her being cast as Princess Eboli, a leading role, in Verdi's opera Don Carlos with the Vienna State Opera on December 16, 1936.

In 1948, Nikolaidi went to the United States with her husband and their son, Michael. She made her Town Hall debut recital in New York City in January 1949. The following morning, Jerome D. Bohm of the New York Herald Tribune wrote: "In 20 years of music reviewing and in twice that number spent in listening to most of the world's best singers, I have encountered no greater voice or vocalist"; the New York Times critic wrote of her "rare brilliance".

She made her American operatic debut as Amneris in Verdi's Aïda with the San Francisco Opera and reprised the role for her Metropolitan Opera debut in 1951 alongside the debut of George London. In the early 1960s she retired from opera but continued concertizing extensively for a number of years.

== Teaching career ==
In 1960, Nikolaidi accepted a position on the voice faculty of Florida State University in Tallahassee. In 1977, she went to Houston, Texas, as the primary voice instructor for the newly established Houston Opera Studio, a young-artist training program that was at that time a joint venture of Houston Grand Opera and the University of Houston; she also instructed a select few university students who were not in the HOS program.

Nikolaidi's pupils included Linda Zoghby, Bruce Fowler, Erie Mills, Glay Posch, and Jan Grissom.

== Death ==
Madame Nikolaidi retired from teaching in 1994 and moved to Santa Fe, New Mexico, where she died, aged 92, in 2002.

== Recordings ==
Elena Nikolaidi made numerous recordings. A small selection is listed below:

- Legendary Voices (CD, Preiser Records; also issued as Lebendige Vergangenheit by Albany Music Distribution). Nikolaidi with the Columbia Symphony Orchestra, Vienna Symphony Orchestra, New York Philharmonic, and pianist Jan Behr performing music of Rossini, Verdi, Bizet, Weber, Richard Strauss, Mozart, Haydn, Schubert, Schumann, and Brahms. (Recorded 1943, 1949, 1950; released 2003)
- Elena Nikolaidi: In Recital (DVD, Video Artists International). Nikolaidi with Guy Bourassa, piano, performing music of Gluck, Wolf, Canteloube, and traditional Greek songs. (Recorded 1961; released 2005)
- Mahler: Das Lied von der Erde, recorded live in 1953 with Bruno Walter and the New York Philharmonic and released on an Archipel CD in 1997 and 2003.
- Richard Strauss: Elektra with the New York Philharmonic conducted by Dimitri Mitropoulos; Nikolaidi sang the role of Klytemnestra. (Recorded 1949)

== Sources ==
- Ward, Charles (May 8, 1994). "Ciao, Niki". Houston Chronicle.
- "Elena Nikolaidi (1909–2002)". Beautyinmusic.com
- Mattison, Ben (November 19, 2002). "Mezzo-Soprano Elena Nikolaidi Is Dead at 96". Houston Chronicle.
- Social Security Death Index
- "Tenna Kraft - Elena Nikolaidi". Classical CD Review.
- "Music: Velvet". Time, January 31, 1949
