= Haydn and Mozart =

Relationship between the two composers

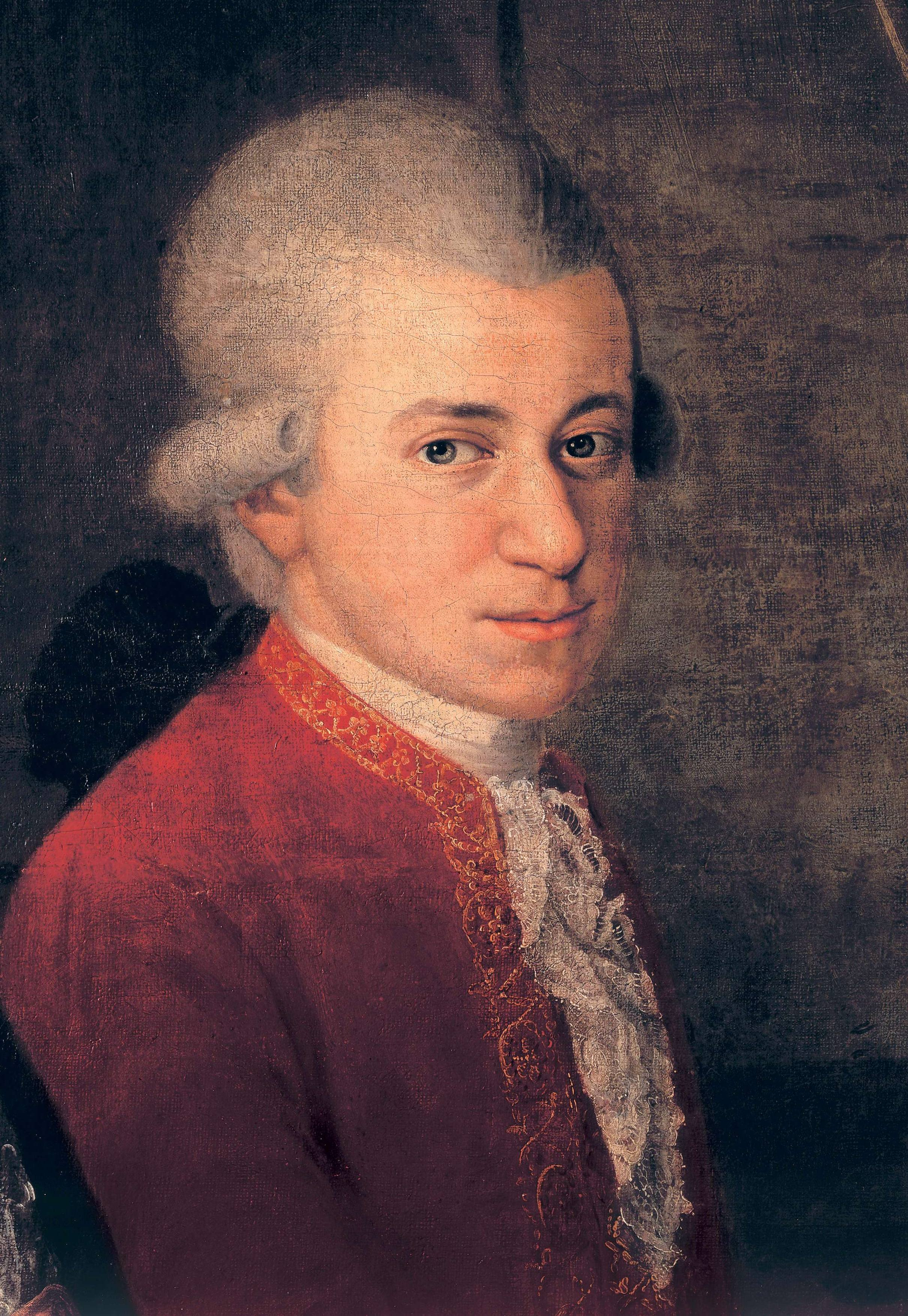
Portraits of Haydn (left) and Mozart (right)

The composers Wolfgang Amadeus Mozart (1756–1791) and Joseph Haydn (1732–1809) were friends. Their relationship is not very well documented, but the evidence that they enjoyed each other's company is strong. Six string quartets by Mozart are dedicated to Haydn (K. 387, 421, 428, 458, 464, 465, the "Haydn" Quartets).

== Background ==
Haydn was already a fairly well-known composer in Mozart's childhood. His six string quartets Opus 20 (1772) were widely circulated and are conjectured (for instance, by Charles Rosen) to have been the inspiration for the six early string quartets K. 168–173 the 17-year-old Mozart wrote during a 1773 visit to Vienna. (Note: See Brown 1992 for dates and K. numbers. Brown discusses the history of the conjecture that K. 168–173 were influenced by Haydn, and argues against it at length.)

The two composers probably weren't able to meet until after Mozart's permanent relocation to Vienna in 1781. Haydn's presence was required most of the time at the palace of Eszterháza in Hungary, about 90 km from Vienna, where his employer and patron Prince Nikolaus Esterházy preferred to live. During the winter months, the Prince moved to the ancestral palace of his family in Eisenstadt, bringing Haydn with him. In these periods it was often feasible for Haydn to make brief visits to Vienna, about 50 km away. (Note: For a listing of occasions when Haydn visited Vienna around this time, see Larsen 1980, pp. 53–55)

== Meeting ==
As Jones notes, there were various points in the 1770s and early 1780s when Haydn and Mozart might have met, Haydn visiting Vienna from his normal work venues of Esterháza and Eisenstadt, Mozart from Salzburg. The earliest at which it is likely they would have met is 22 and 23 December 1783, at a performance sponsored by the Vienna Tonkünstler-Societät, a charitable organization for musicians. On the program were works by both Haydn (Jones: "a symphony and a chorus, both probably from [the oratorio] Il ritorno di Tobia") and Mozart ("a new concert aria, probably 'Misero! o sogno!' [K. 431], and, on the first night, a piano concerto.")

At the time of this meeting, Haydn was the most celebrated composer in Europe. (Note: This characterization is made widely in scholarly writing about Haydn, though different scholars give different estimates for when he held this status. See, e.g. Nicolas Temperley (1991) Haydn: The Creation, Cambridge University Press, p. 5; H. C. Robbins Landon (1981) Haydn, a Documentary Study. Thames and Hudson, p. 12; Jones (2009a:vii); Lucktenberg, George (2005) Haydn: An Introduction to His Keyboard Works, Alfred Publishing, p. 2; Webster and Feder (2001:1). For a similar contemporary assessment (from the Wiener Zeitung, 1797, see Jones (2009a:183).) Mozart's own reputation was definitely on the rise. His opera The Abduction from the Seraglio had been premiered with great success in Vienna, and was being produced in several other cities. Haydn would have been 51 at the time, and Mozart 27.

== Playing chamber music ==
Jens Peter Larsen suggests that "quartet playing was central to the contact between Haydn and Mozart", although the documentation of the occasions in which the two composers played or heard quartets or other chamber music together is slim. One report of such an occasion comes from the Reminiscences (1826) of the Irish tenor Michael Kelly, who premiered Mozart's most important operatic lyric tenor roles.

Storace gave a quartet party to his friends. The players were tolerable; not one of them [except for Dittersdorf] excelled on the instrument he played, but there was a little science (Note: Kelly uses the archaic meaning of "science", i.e. "knowledge, learning".) among them, which I dare say will be acknowledged when I name them:

First Violin: Haydn
Second Violin: Baron Dittersdorf
Violoncello: Vanhal
Viola: Mozart.

I was there, and a greater treat, or a more remarkable one, cannot be imagined.

Both Dittersdorf and Wanhal, though little-remembered now, were well-known composers (particularly of symphonies) of the time. (Many, if not most, now believe that Dittersdorf actually played first violin, given his world-class technique, and Haydn second.)

The composer Maximilian Stadler also remembered chamber music performances in which Haydn and Mozart participated: the two of them took the viola parts in performances of Mozart's string quintets, K. 515, 516, and 593.

== Haydn's view of Mozart ==
Haydn freely praised Mozart, without jealousy, to his friends. For instance, he wrote to Franz Rott,

If only I could impress Mozart's inimitable works on the soul of every friend of music, and the souls of high personages in particular, as deeply, with the same musical understanding and with the same deep feeling, as I understand and feel them, the nations would vie with each other to possess such a jewel.

To the musicologist Charles Burney, he said, "I have often been flattered by my friends with having some genius, but he was much my superior." In a letter to his friend Marianne von Genzinger, Haydn confessed to dreaming about Mozart's work, listening happily to a performance of The Marriage of Figaro. (Note: The letter is printed in Geiringer 1982, pp. 90–92.)

== Mozart's view of Haydn ==
Mozart's early biographer Franz Niemetschek, who interviewed Mozart's widow Constanze, describes Mozart's esteem for Haydn. In one passage from his biography he says:

High esteem for true merit, and regard for the individual, influenced his judgment of works of art. He was always very touched when he spoke of the two Haydns or other great masters.

By "Haydns", Niemetschek refers also to Joseph's brother Michael, who was both Leopold and W. A. Mozart's friend and colleague during his many years in Salzburg as organist-choirmaster of the cathedral there.

An often-retold anecdote from Niemetschek is the following:

At a private party a new work of Joseph Haydn was being performed. Besides Mozart there were a number of other musicians present, among them a certain man who was never known to praise anyone but himself. He was standing next to Mozart and found fault with one thing after another. For a while Mozart listened patiently; when he could bear it no longer and the fault-finder once more conceitedly declared: "I would not have done that", Mozart retorted: "Neither would I, but do you know why? Because neither of us could have thought of anything so appropriate.

Niemetschek concludes, "By this remark he made for himself yet another irreconcilable enemy."

However, scholars have questioned the authenticity of Niemetschek's claims regarding Mozart. Niemetschek claimed to have had a long association with Mozart, but the lack of direct quotations or citings of personal conversations leads some scholars to doubt his claims. However, he welcomed Mozart's two surviving sons, Karl and Wolfgang Jr., into his home in the Lesser Quarter and became a foster father figure to them.

== The "Haydn" quartets ==
Mozart's "Haydn" quartets (K. 387, 421, 428, 458, 464, and 465) were written during the early years of their friendship, and were published in 1785. They are thought to be stylistically influenced by Haydn's Opus 33 series, which had appeared in 1781. Mozart's dedication of these six quartets to Haydn was rather unusual, at a time when dedicatees were usually aristocrats:

A father who had decided to send his sons out into the great world thought it his duty to entrust them to the protection and guidance of a man who was very celebrated at the time, and who happened moreover to be his best friend. In the same way I send my six sons to you ... Please, then, receive them kindly and be to them a father, guide, and friend! ... I entreat you, however, to be indulgent to those faults which may have escaped a father's partial eye, and in spite of them, to continue your generous friendship towards one who so highly appreciates it.

Haydn in turn was very impressed with Mozart's new work. He heard the new quartets for the first time at a social occasion on 15 January 1785, at which Mozart performed the quartets with "my dear friend Haydn and other good friends". (Note: Deutsch 1965, p. 234 suggests that on this evening only the first three of the quartets were played.) At a second occasion, on 12 February, the last three were performed. (Note: Deutsch 1965, p. 236 identifies the four players as probably having been the composer, his father Leopold and two Barons: Anton and Bartholomäus Tinti, who were Masonic brothers of Mozart.) Mozart's father Leopold was present, having come from Salzburg to visit. At that time Haydn made a remark to Leopold that is now widely quoted:

Before God and as an honest man I tell you that your son is the greatest composer known to me either in person or by name; he has taste, and, furthermore, the most profound knowledge of composition. (Note: Leopold Mozart's 16 February 1785 letter to his daughter Maria Anna ("Ich sage Ihnen vor Gott, als ein ehrlicher Mann, ihr Sohn ist der größte Componist, den ich von Person und den Nahmen nach kenne: er hat Geschmack, und über das die größte Compositionswissenschaft."))

Mozart would have likely appreciated this testimony, in light of his father's frequently-expressed doubts about his career path.

== Freemasonry ==
It may have been Mozart who was responsible for bringing Haydn into Freemasonry. (Note: Thomson 1976, p. 28 writes, "[T]he close friendship between the two composers makes it almost certain that this was due to Mozart's influence".) Mozart joined the lodge called "Zur Wohltätigkeit" ("Beneficence") on 14 December 1784, and Haydn applied to the lodge "Zur wahren Eintracht" ("True Concord") on 29 December 1784 probably convinced by Mozart. Lodge records show that Mozart frequently attended "Zur wahren Eintracht" as a visitor. Haydn's admission ceremony was held on 11 February 1785; Mozart could not attend due to a concert that night. Although Mozart remained an enthusiastic Mason, Haydn did not; in fact, there is no evidence that he ever attended a meeting after his admittance ceremony, and he was dropped from the lodge's rolls in 1787.

== Form of address ==
The German language has two sets of second person pronouns, one (Sie, Ihnen, Ihr, etc.) for relatively formal relationships, the other (du, dich, dir, etc.) for more intimate relationships (see T-V distinction). Otto Jahn, in his 1856 Mozart biography, reported that Haydn and Mozart used the informal du forms in conversation, an unusual practice at the time for two people of such different ages, hence evidence for a close friendship. Jahn relied on the testimony of Mozart's sister-in-law Sophie Haibel as well as Haydn's friend and biographer Georg August Griesinger.

== Haydn's departure for London ==
Haydn last saw Mozart in the days before he departed for London in December 1790. The oft-retold tale of their last interactions can be found in the biography of Albert Christoph Dies, who interviewed the elderly Haydn 15 years after the event:

[Haydn's patron] Prince Anton Esterházy granted permission for the journey at once, but it was not right as far as Haydn's friends were concerned ... they reminded him of his age (sixty years), (Note: Haydn was actually 58 in 1790.) of the discomforts of a long journey, and of many other things to shake his resolve. But in vain! Mozart especially took pains to say, "Papa!" as he usually called him, "you have had no training for the great world, and you speak too few languages."

"Oh," replied Haydn, "my language is understood all over the world!"...

When Haydn had settled ... his household affairs, he fixed his departure and left on 15 December [1790], (Note: The original reads 1791, an error.) in company with Salomon. Mozart on this day never left his friend Haydn. He dined with him, and said at the moment of parting, "We are probably saying our last farewell in this life." Tears welled from the eyes of both. Haydn was deeply moved, for he applied Mozart's words to himself, and the possibility never occurred to him that the thread of Mozart's life could be cut off by the inexorable Parcae within the following year.

Griesinger gives a different (and probably less romanticized) account of the same occasion:

Mozart said to Haydn, at a happy meal with Salomon, "You will not bear it very long and will probably soon come back again, because you are no longer young." "But I am still vigorous and in good health," answered Haydn. He was at that time almost 59, and didn't find it necessary to hide his age. But for Mozart's early death on 5 December 1791, he would have taken Haydn's place in Salomon's concerts in 1794.

== Mozart's death ==
Haydn, still in London a year later when the news of Mozart's death reached him, was distraught; he wrote to their mutual friend Michael Puchberg, "For some time I was quite beside myself over his death, and could not believe that Providence should so quickly have called away an irreplaceable man into the next world". (Note: For Haydn's friendship with Puchberg see Webster & Feder 2001, section iii.4.) Haydn wrote to Constanze Mozart offering musical instruction to her son when he reached the appropriate age, and later followed through on his offer.
