= Tonkünstler-Societät =

Music organisation

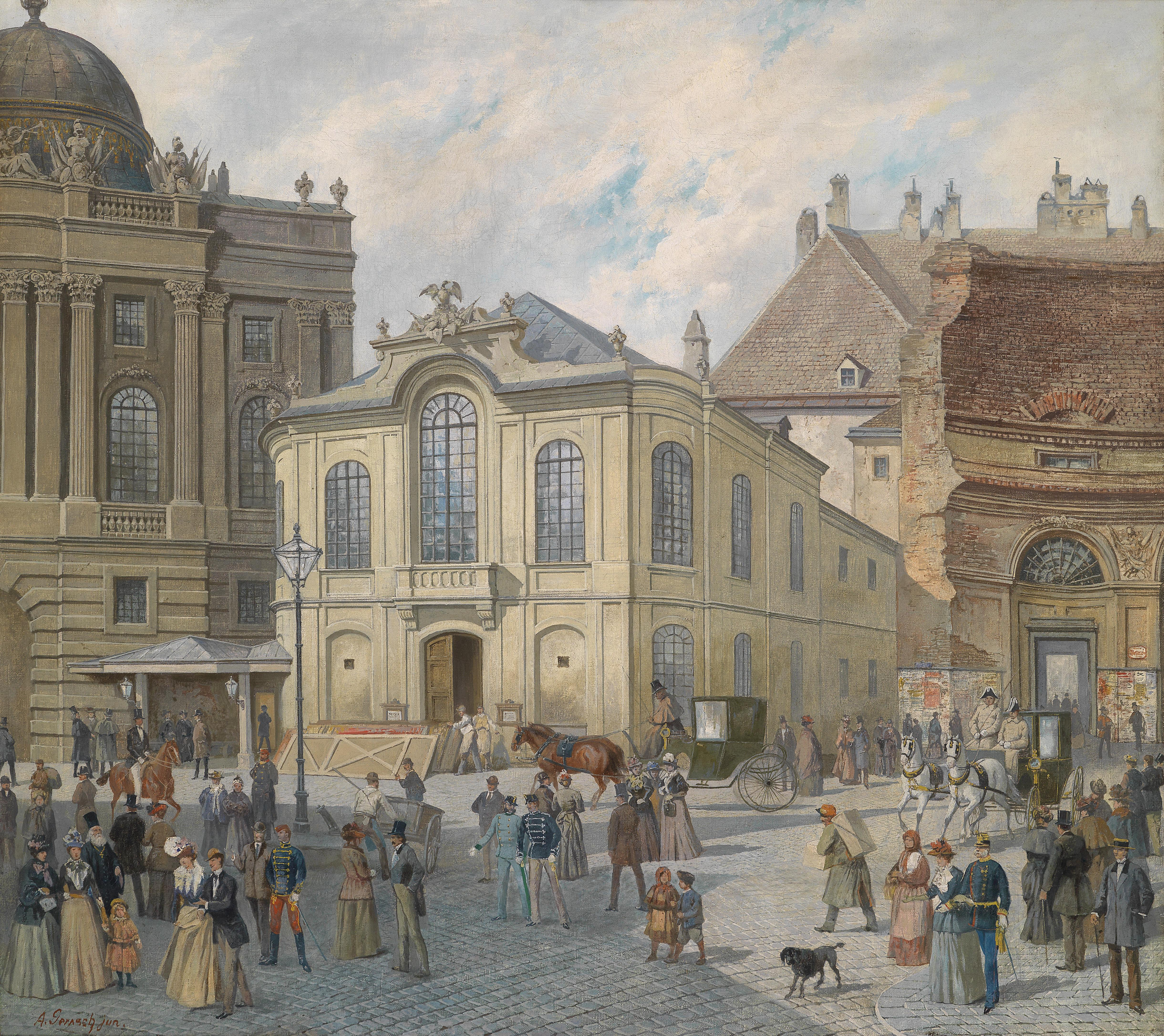
A 19th-century portrayal by August Gerasch of the old Burgtheater, venue of a number of the Tonkünstler-Societät's concerts

The Tonkünstler-Societät ("Society of Musicians") was a benevolent society for musicians in Vienna, which lasted from the mid-18th century to the mid-20th. Its purpose was "to support retired musicians and their families". Beginning in 1772, the Society mounted a series of benefit concerts, often with large forces of performers, at which were performed works by leading Classical-period composers, including Joseph Haydn, Wolfgang Amadeus Mozart, and Ludwig van Beethoven.

== History ==
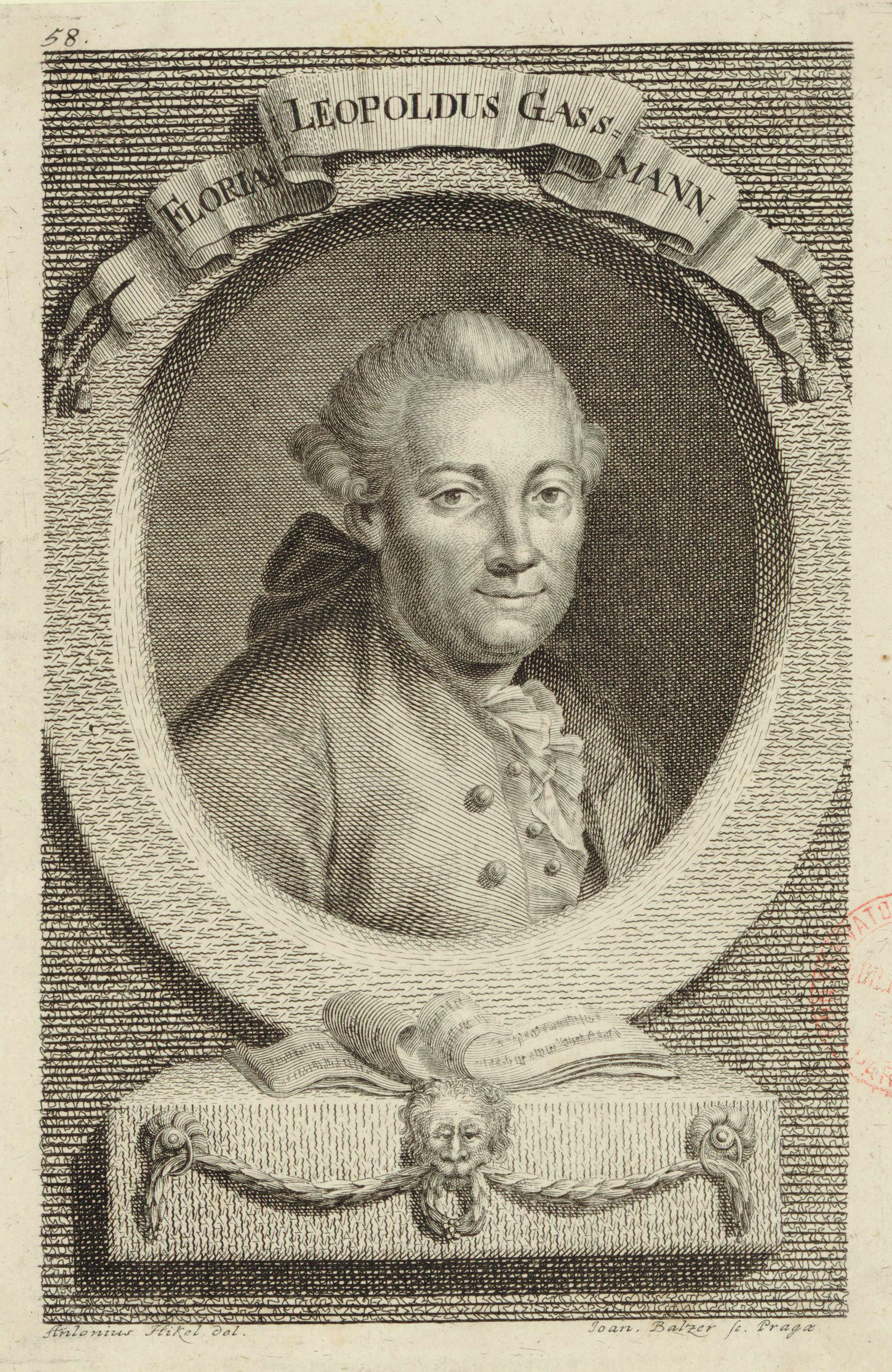
Florian Gassmann, engraving from 1775 by Johann Balzer

The Society was founded by Florian Gassmann in 1771. It was also known as the "Gesellschaft der Wiener Tonkünstler zum Unterhalte ihrer Witwen und Waisen"; i.e. "Society of Viennese Musicians for the Support of their Widows and Orphans." Until 1811 (the year that the Gesellschaft der Musikfreunde was founded), it was the only private organization offering concerts in Vienna.

The Society was strongly supported by the aristocracy (who were, along with the Church, the primary employers of musicians at the time). In her decree (23 February 1771) authorizing the founding of the Society, the empress Maria Theresa also made an initial contribution to the Society's fund in the amount of 500 ducats (about 2000 florins). Later, the diarist Karl von Zinzendorf observed that attendance at the Society's charitable concerts was considered something of a duty for members of the nobility. The Society served as a model for comparable organizations, not just in the Austrian Empire but also in Berlin (1801) and St. Petersburg (1802).

The performances of the Society were given on a schedule that remained fairly consistent across the years: two performances at Easter time, and two just before Christmas. In its earlier years, the organization was fairly adventurous, mounting performances of new or recent works. Around 1800, traditionalism set in, and the programs now emphasized music that had come to be revered, including many performances (initially led by the composer) of Haydn's two great oratorios, The Creation and The Seasons. Indeed, in 1862 the organization renamed itself after Haydn: ("Haydn", Witwen- und Waisen-Versorgungs-Verein der Tonkünstler in Wien = "Haydn: Musician's society for the care of widows and orphans in Vienna").

The Society endured until 1939 when on 9 March the National Socialist government of Germany abolished it; Germany had annexed Austria in the previous year (the Anschluss).

From the viewpoint of the history of music, the greatest significance of the Society falls in its early period, up to the early 1800s, when it played an important role in premiering or disseminating works of music still acclaimed to this day. For the later period, after public concerts elsewhere had come to flourish and the Society's own programming had become conservative, the historical significance of the Society became less, and mentions of the organization in the work of music scholars are few.

== The performing forces of the Society ==
The Society was unusual in the sheer size of the orchestras and choruses that performed in their concerts. For the concerts of 1 and 3 April 1781, where Mozart made his first appearance with the Society (see below), there were 40 violins, 8 violas, 9 cellos, 11 contrabasses, 2 flutes, 7 oboes, 6 bassoons, 2 English horns, 4 horns, 2 trumpets, and 1 timpanist, a total of 92. The chorus had a combined total of 28 sopranos and altos (all boys), 13 tenors, and 13 basses; thus overall a total of 146 performers. Comparable numbers were employed in other years. In a letter written home to his father Leopold, Mozart expressed wonderment at the size of the orchestra and delight in how well his symphony had come off at the concert.

These numbers were made possible by the fact that participation in the Society's concerts was obligatory for all members (else they had to pay a small fee in compensation). In addition, some prospective Society members also performed.

Edge suggests that one should not assume that such forces were used for all numbers on the program; concertos in particular may have just used a subset of the musicians for better balance.

== Relations to the great Classical-era composers ==
Although the Society is frequently mentioned in biographies of Haydn, Mozart, and Beethoven, only Haydn ever actually belonged to it, and that in exceptional circumstances. Haydn first composed a work for the Society to perform in 1773 (Il ritorno di Tobia; see below). In 1778, he signed up for membership and duly paid his enrollment fee, but was asked on top of this to write further compositions for free at the Society's command. Haydn refused, and he then was rejected for membership. Relations between Haydn and the Society remained cold for some time. In 1781, they were unable to come to an agreement for a repeat performance of Il ritorno di Tobia, though for the Spring 1784 concerts they were able to arrive at an accommodation. Haydn's works continued thereafter to appear on Society programs. Haydn did not finally become a member until 1797; at this point his many contributions to the Society's charitable concerts over the years led the Society to make him an honorary member.

Mozart attempted to become a member in 1785, around the time his Davidde Penitente was performed by the Society (see below). His application procedure stalled because of the requirement that Mozart produce his birth certificate (he had been born in faraway Salzburg, making it harder to do so). Mozart promised twice to provide it but never did. His dilatoriness was unwise, since when he died in 1791 he left both many debts and a wife (Constanze Mozart) with two young children. Fortunately, Constanze proved an astute businesswoman and eventually managed to achieve prosperity from the publication of her husband's works.

Although his works were performed by the Society, Beethoven was never enrolled as a member. He was, however, honored by the Society for his services (as was Haydn) with a free pass to all of its concerts.

== Haydn, Mozart, Beethoven, Mendelssohn in the Society's concerts ==
Most often, a concert of the Society would program a large work (typically an oratorio), supplementing it with smaller works, often for solo or small ensembles. The smaller works usually were chosen to be different on the two nights a concert was given. Haydn was represented multiple times as composer of the large work and sometimes of the smaller works; in their lifetimes Mozart and Beethoven were the composers of the large work just once each, and several times of the smaller works.

=== Haydn ===
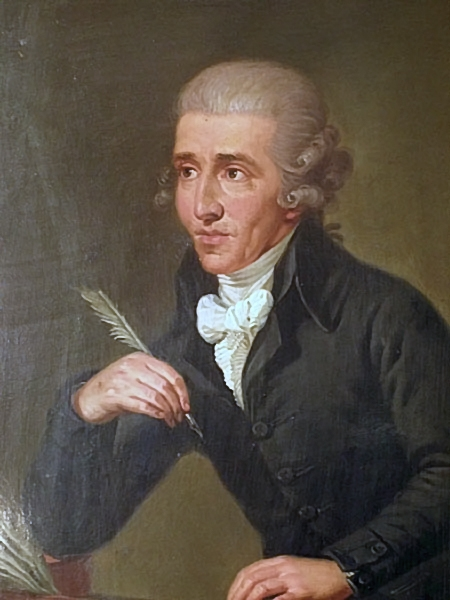
Haydn as portrayed by Ludwig Guttenbrunn. The portrait dates from c. 1791–1792, but depicts Haydn c. 1770, based on an earlier version.

- 2 and 4 April 1775: Joseph Haydn led the premiere performances of his oratorio Il ritorno di Tobia; the work was commissioned by the Society. The libretto of the work is in Italian; this reflected the practice of the society in its early years, following the tradition of the imperial court; later the Society was to shift toward German-language works. Haydn brought most of the vocal soloists for his oratorio with him from the Esterházy court, and also his colleagues to play concertos as the shorter works: his concertmaster Luigi Tomasini played a violin concerto on the 2nd, Xavier Marteau a cello concerto on the 4th. Smither writes, "The oratorio was enormously successful and called the attention of the Viennese to Haydn's extraordinary ability."
- 17 March 1777. A variety of works were performed, including a chorus from Il ritorno di Tobia.
- 12 and 14 March 1780. A variety of works, including on the 14th a "grand new symphony" by Haydn.
- 23 and 23 December 1783: "symphonie" and chorus by Haydn, thought perhaps to be from Il ritorno di Tobia. Mozart's work was also represented; see below. This concert is conjectured to be the occasion on which Haydn and Mozart, who became good friends, first met.
- 28 and 30 March 1784: Haydn led his Il ritorno di Tobia in a revised version with two new choruses. This time, the vocal soloists were eminent singers based in Vienna, including Caterina Cavalieri and Nancy Storace.
- 13 and 17 March 1785: The first part included a Haydn symphony. For the main programming, see the same date under "Mozart" below.
- 15 and 16 April 1792: A program by a variety of composers, including a symphony and a chorus by Haydn, at the time away from Vienna in the first of his two visits to London.
- 23 and 24 March 1793: Haydn, now back in Vienna, led performances of three of his recently completed London symphonies.
- 12 and 13 April 1794: A program by various composers, including Haydn's Surprise Symphony. Haydn was again away in London on his second trip.
- 1 and 2 April 1798: Haydn led his The Seven Last Words of Christ in the public premiere of the new version with choral parts. On the first night Beethoven had a share in the program; see below.
- 22 and 23 December: Premiere of Haydn's concert aria Solo et pensoso, performed by the soprano, "Demoiselle Flamm". The Military Symphony was also performed.
- 17 and 18 March 1799: The Seven Last Words was again performed under Haydn's direction.
- 22 and 23 December 1799: The first performance by the Society of Haydn's The Creation, under the direction of the composer. The work was evidently so popular that the Society could increase its fundraising by doubling the normal ticket price.
- 1800: All four performances during this year were of The Creation. Haydn, whose health was becoming precarious, passed the task of directing the December performances to Paul Wranitzky.
- Spring, 1801: Again The Seven Last Words under Haydn's direction.
- 22 and 23 December 1801: The first performance by the Society of Haydn's The Seasons, under the direction of the composer.
- 1802: All four performances during this year were of The Seasons.
- 1808: Haydn's Il ritorno di Tobia made a third appearance, this time in a revised version by the elderly composer's pupil, Sigismund Neukomm. The performance of 22 December required the labors of most of the highly qualified musicians in Vienna, with regrettable consequences for a now-famous concert taking place in Vienna on the same evening, a benefit for Ludwig van Beethoven.

Haydn died in 1809. The Creation and The Seasons continued over the decades as frequent choices for performance by the Society.

=== Mozart and his colleagues ===
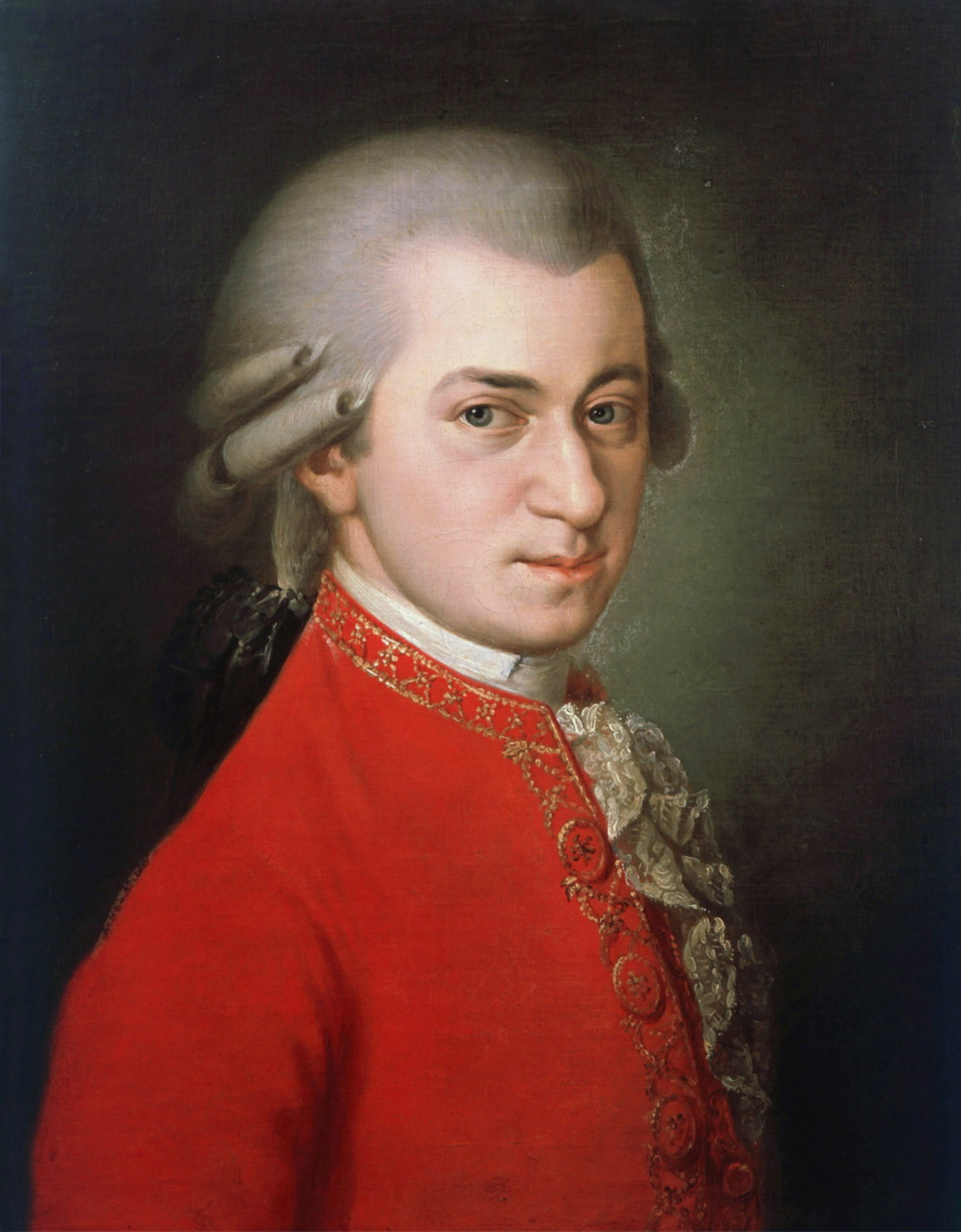
Posthumous portrait of Mozart by Barbara Kraft (1819), after originals painted in his lifetime

- 21 and 25 March 1773. The main work on the program was Santa Elena al Calvario, an oratorio by Johann Adolf Hasse. The concert also included the public debut in Vienna of the two clarinettist brothers Anton and Johann Stadler, who were to perform in many of Mozart's works after he moved to Vienna in the 1780s; see in particular 22 and 23 December 1789 below.
- 1 and 3 April 1781: The music drama Die Pilgrime auf Golgatha by Johann Georg Albrechtsberger. The vocal soloists were Caterina Cavalieri, Therese Teyber, Valentin Adamberger, and Ludwig Fischer, all members of the Emperor's German opera company who would take leading roles at the premiere of Mozart's Die Entführung aus dem Serail the following year. For the April 3 performance only, the program was augmented; this was the adult Mozart's first public appearance in Vienna. A symphony by Mozart was played, which Deutsch conjectures was No. 34. He also improvised at the piano. Mozart had only recently arrived in Vienna, where he was to spend the rest of his career; and was still in the service of Archbishop Colloredo. The Society had to lobby the Archbishop to obtain Mozart's services.
- 23 and 23 December 1783: The program included "a new rondo" by Mozart sung by Adamberger; Deutsch suggests this work was "Misero! o sogno!/Aura che intorno", K. 431. On the 22nd only, the program also included a piano concerto by Mozart with the composer as soloist. This concert is conjectured to be the occasion on which Haydn and Mozart, who became good friends, first met.
- 13 and 17 March 1785: In the second part was performed the premiere of Mozart's Davide penitente, K. 469, which was commissioned by the Tonkünstler-Societät. Most of the music is derived from the unfinished Great Mass in C minor, K. 427 (1782–83). The performance took place in the Burgtheater. Unusually, these performances were poorly attended; the first night yielded only 733 florins (216 paid by the Emperor), and the second night only 163 florins from an audience of about 200.
- 22 and 23 December 1785. The oratorio Esther by Carl Ditters von Dittersdorf, conducted by Antonio Salieri. Between the two parts, the Dec. 22 concert featured a violin concerto played by Joseph Otter; on the 23rd Mozart filled this time slot, playing one of his piano concertos (not identified). The critic for the Wiener Zeitung wrote, "the favorable reception of [Mozart's concerto] we forbear to mention, since our praise is superfluous in view of the deserved fame of this master."
- 22 and 23 December 1789: The cantata Il natale d'Apollo by Vincenzo Righini was performed in the Burgtheater. Mozart's sister-in-law Josepha Hofer, who later sang as the first Queen of the Night in The Magic Flute, was one of the vocal soloists; other Mozart colleagues who sang were Cavalieri (see above) and Vincenzo Calvesi (the first Ferrando in Così fan tutte). In the December 22 concert was also heard the first known performance of Mozart's Clarinet Quintet. The clarinettist was Mozart's friend Anton Stadler.
- 16 and 17 April 1791: In a concert with music by several composers, Mozart's music is again represented: an aria was sung by his sister-in-law Aloysia Lange, and a "grand symphony" performed. Rushton suggests the latter was the 40th Symphony, in its revised version with clarinet parts.

Mozart died in 1791.

- 22 and 23 December 1815. The main work was Handel's oratorio Alexander's Feast, in the revised scoring by Mozart with additional wind parts.
- 27 and 28 March 1836. The main work was Handel's oratorio Messiah, in the revised scoring by Mozart with additional wind parts.

=== Beethoven ===
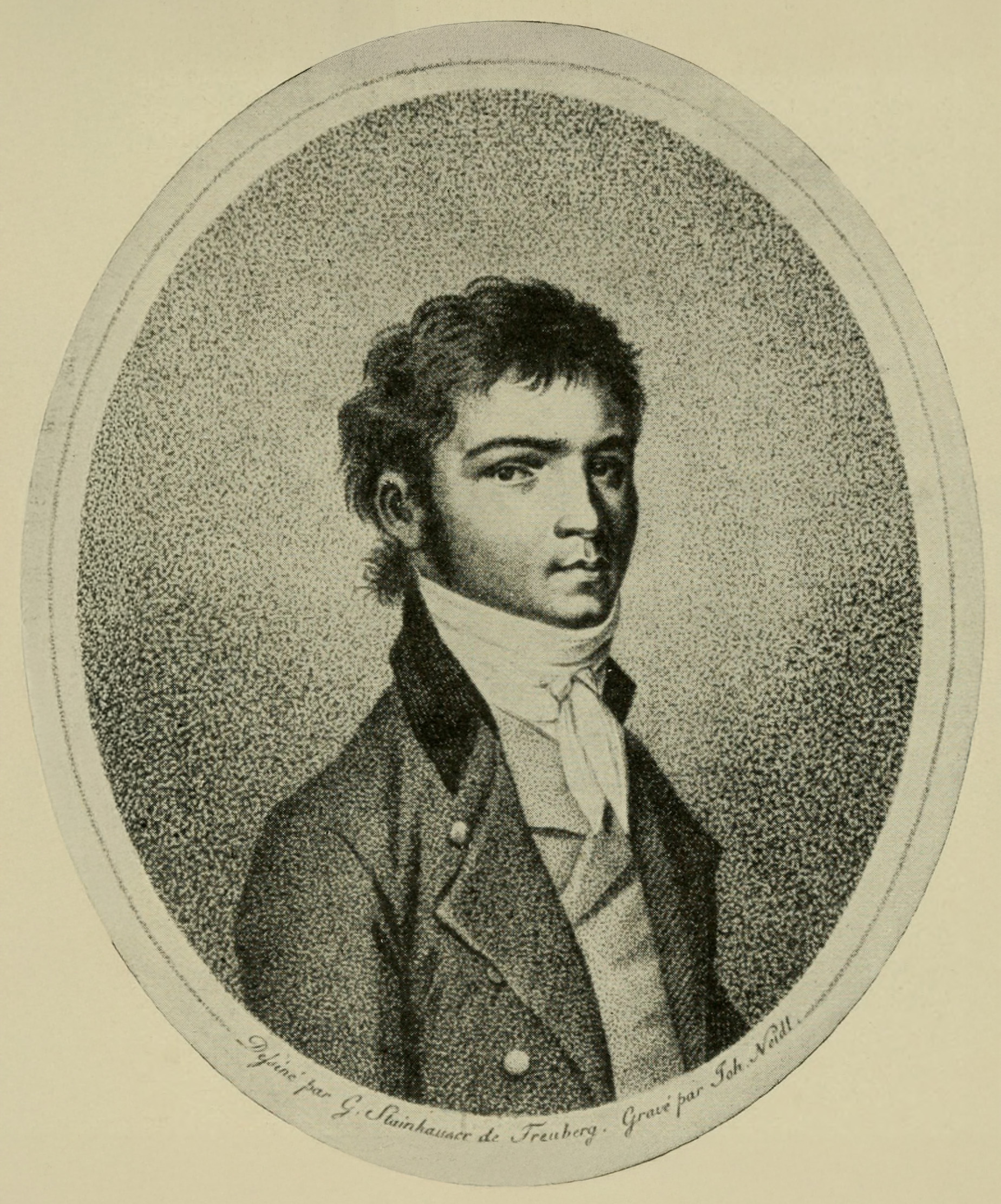
1801 engraving by Johann Joseph Neidl after a now-lost portrait of Beethoven by Gandolph Ernst Stainhauser von Treuberg, ca. 1800

- 29 March 1795: Beethoven's first public concert appearance in Vienna. He played one of his first two piano concertos; which one is not known. Première of the oratorio Gioas re di Giuda by Antonio Casimir Cartellieri in an addition to two of his symphonies in C minor and E-flat major.
- 23 December 1797: on the program was Beethoven's set of variations on 'Là ci darem la mano' from Mozart's opera Don Giovanni, for two oboes and English horn.
- 1 and 2 April 1798: In a concert whose main work was Haydn's The Seven Last Words of Christ (see above), Beethoven had a share in the first night's program, performing the piano part in his Quintet for Piano and Winds.
- 30 and 31 March 1817: Works by the now-celebrated Beethoven: his Seventh Symphony and his oratorio Christus am Ölberge.
- 24 and 26 March 1839: the program included works of Beethoven, who had died in 1827: the second movement of the Seventh Symphony and his cantata Der glorreiche Augenblick, performed to a text by Friedrich Rochlitz with the title Preis der Tonkunst ("In praise of music").

=== Mendelssohn ===
- 22 and 23 December 1857: Elijah by Felix Mendelssohn (1809–1847). The work, premiered elsewhere in 1846, had joined the ranks of classic works suitable for performance by an oratorio society.
