= Friedrich Noack =

German cultural historian and author

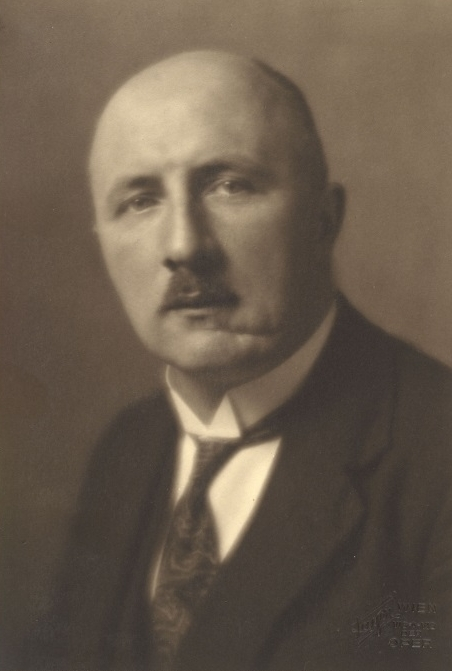
Friedrich Noack Portrait

Friedrich Noack, who wrote under the pseudonym F. Idus, (20 April 1858, Gießen – 1 February 1930, Freiburg im Breisgau) was a German cultural historian and author, who wrote several articles for the Künstlerlexikon (arts dictionary) Thieme-Becker.

In 1886, he translated Sebastian Brant's "Narrenschiff" and published it with his own illustrations.

For his work on the Germans in Rome in the 18th century, he devised a comprehensive archive of notes. On 18,000 slips of paper, it contains over 11,000 entries on artists active in Rome and their clients, usually in Gabelsberger shorthand, but also in newspaper cuttings and archive statements. Today the material is stored in the archive of the Bibliotheca Hertziana in Rome and is accessible online.

== Works ==
- Des alten Sebastian Brand Neues Narrenschiff. Entdeckt und herausgegeben von Dr. F. Idus. Düsseldorf: Bagel 1886.
- Deutsches Leben in Rom 1700 bis 1900. Stuttgart 1907
- Das Deutsche Rom. Rome 1912
- Das Deutschtum in Rom seit dem Ausgang des Mittelalters. 2 volumes., Stuttgart 1927.
