= Andreas Spering =

German conductor and harpsichordist (born 1966)

Andreas Spering (born in 1966) is a German conductor and harpsichordist, who specializes in Early music. He is the younger brother of the conductor Christoph Spering.

== Recordings ==
- Kantaten für Esterhazy by Joseph Haydn
- Siroe, by Georg Friedrich Händel.
- Imeneo by Georg Friedrich Händel.
- Gera: die Feuerbrunst by Joseph Haydn
- Erwin und Elmire by Johann Friedrich Reichardt.
- Serenades op. 11 and op. 16 by Johannes Brahms
- The Creation by Joseph Haydn.
- Il ritorno di Tobia by Joseph Haydn.
- Applausus by Joseph Haydn.
