= Johann Christian Reinhart =

German painter (1761–1847)

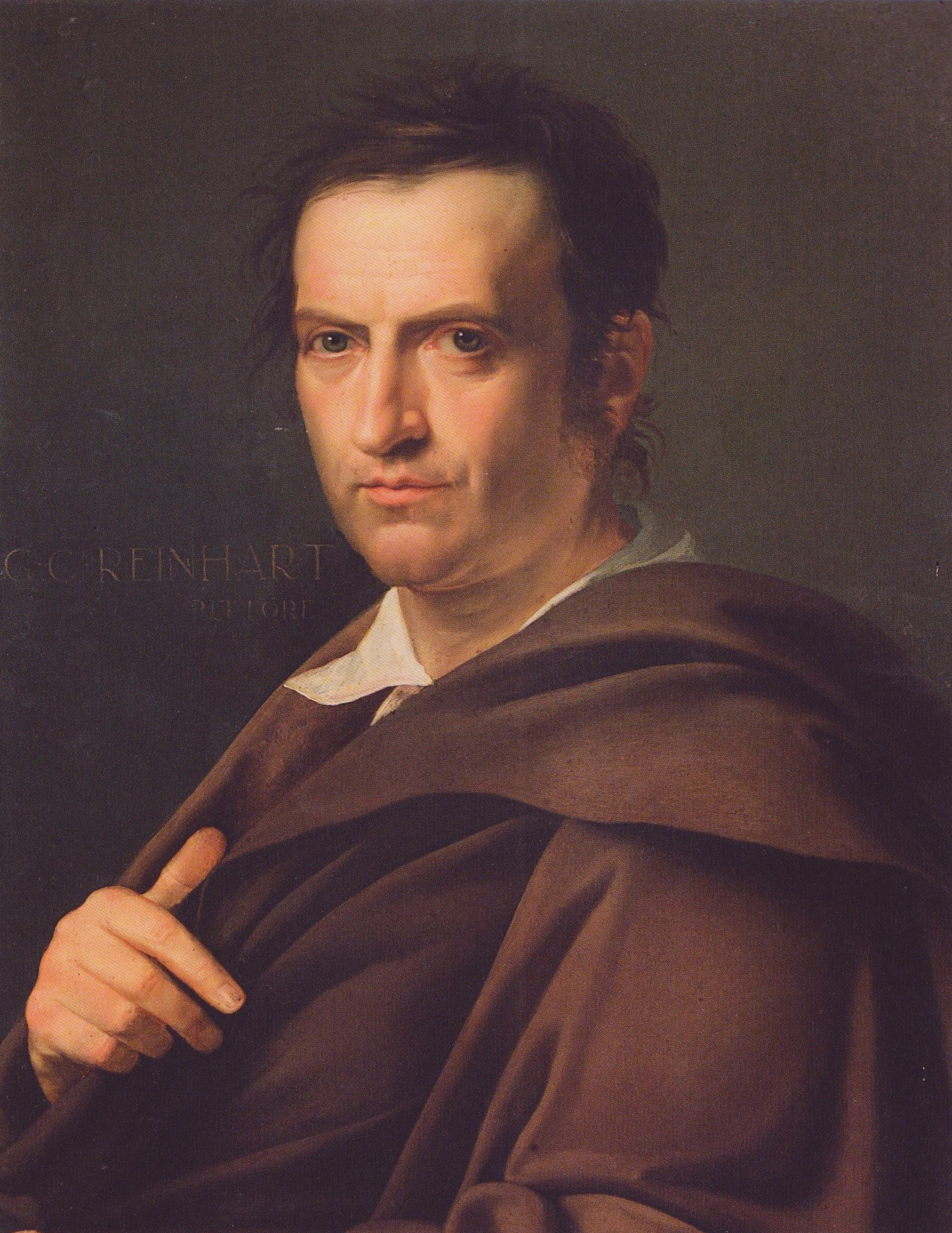
Portrait of Reinhart 1812, by José de Madrazo y Agudo

Johann Christian Reinhart (24 January 1761 – 9 June 1847) was a German painter and engraver. He was one of the founders, along with Joseph Anton Koch, of German romantic classical landscape painting.

== Biography ==
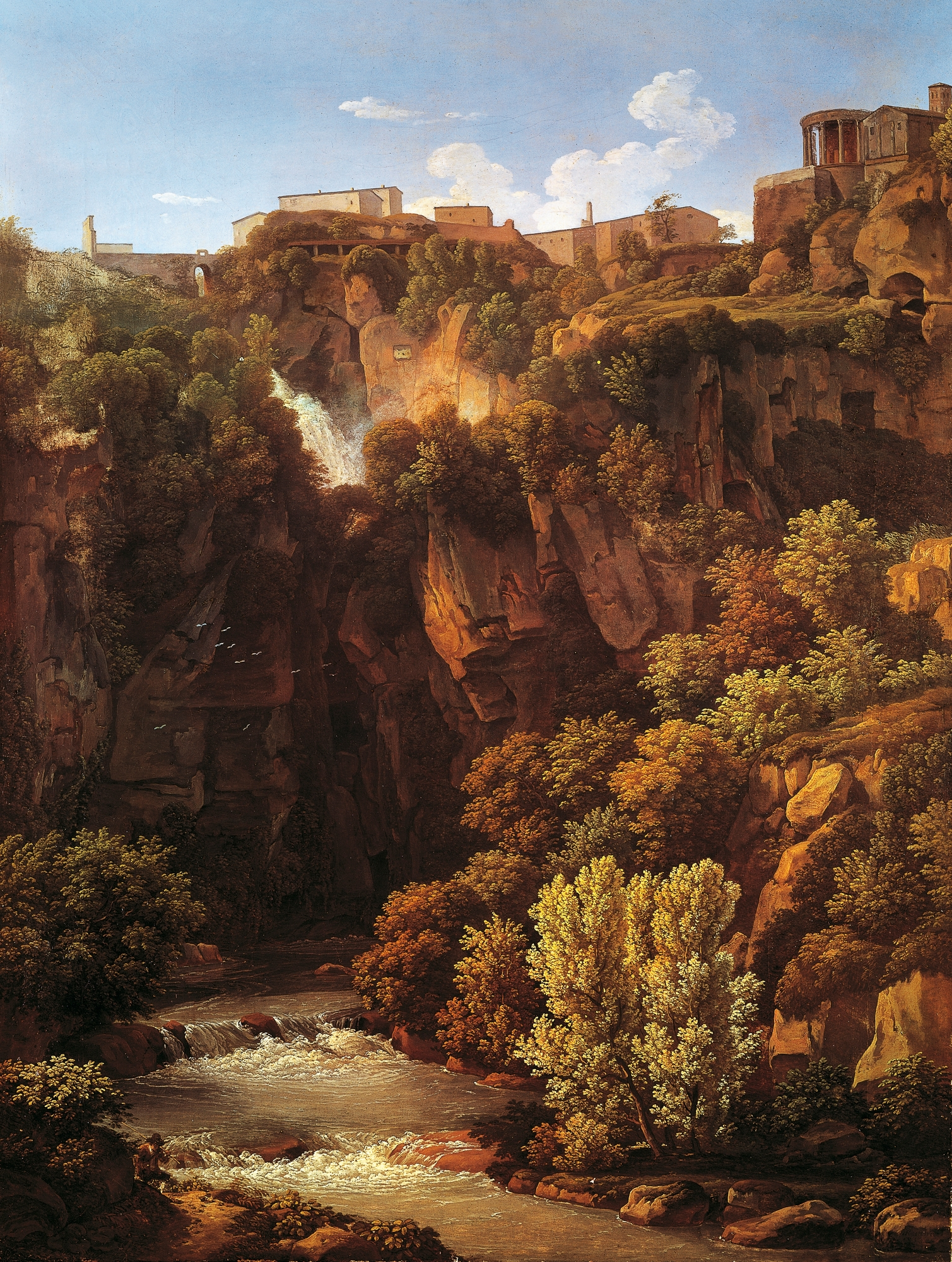
Wasserfälle bei Tivoli (1813)

Reinhart was born in Hof, Bavaria, and attended the gymnasium in Hof where he was encouraged to draw by one of his teachers. His artistic career was divided between his early years in Germany and a career as a professional artist in Italy and France.

=== Early years in Germany ===
Following in his father's footsteps, Johann Christian started to study theology but turned more and more to art. He studied under Adam Friedrich Oeser in Leipzig. In 1783 he moved to Dresden where he furthered his studies under Johann Christian Klengel who taught him chiefly after the Dutch masters. On the death of his mother in 1784, he spent a short time in Hof before returning to Dresden. He struck up a friendship with Friedrich Schiller in 1785.

=== Professional artist in Italy ===
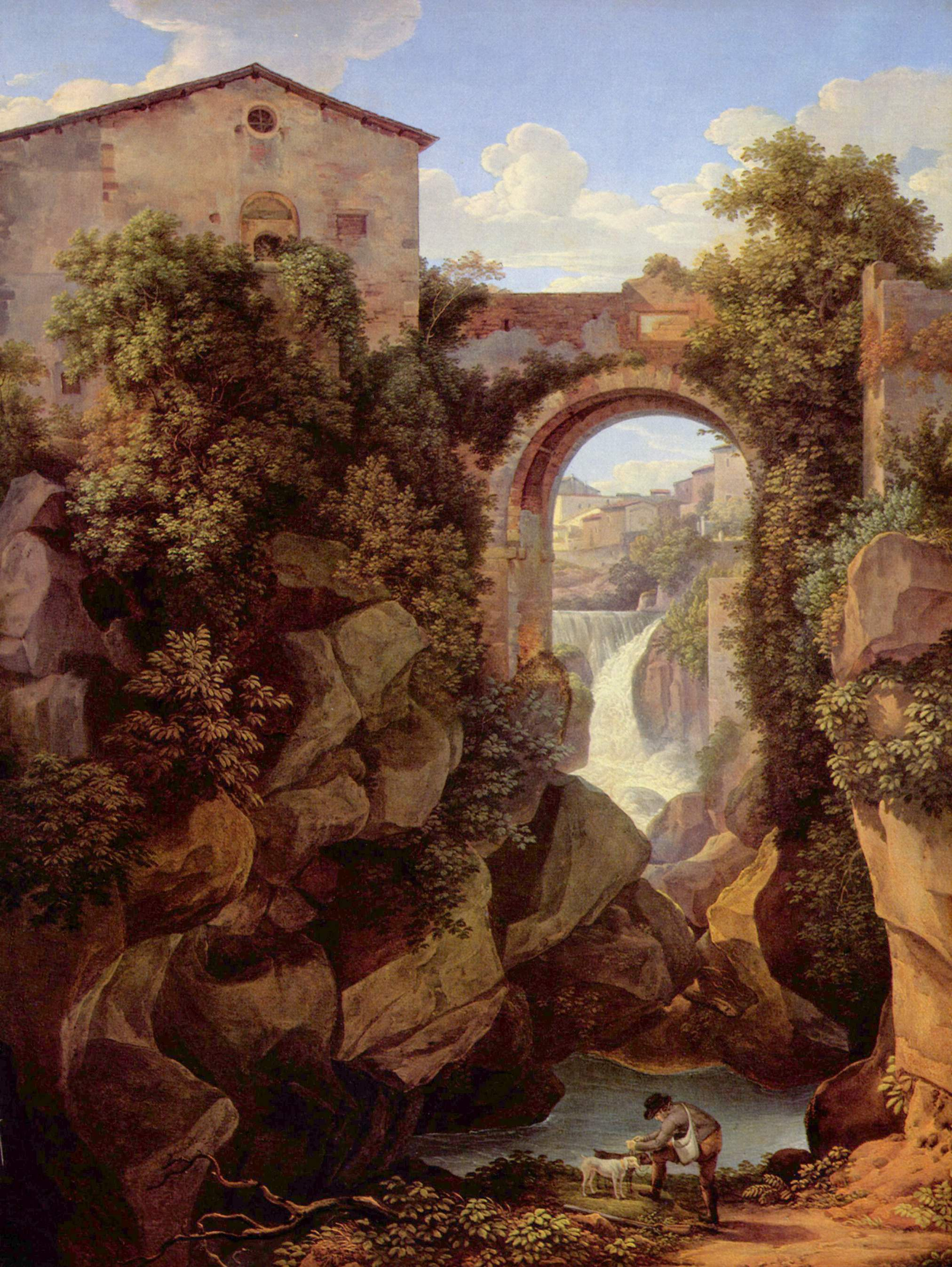
Blick auf Tivoli (1813)

In 1789, supported by the hereditary Prince of Coburg-Gotha, he got a grant from the Margrave of Ansbach-Bayreuth, and, aged 28, he left Dresden and moved to Rome. The grant continued until 1791/92 when the Margravate of Ansbach-Bayreuth became part of Prussia. Reinhart came under the influence of the classicist German painters Asmus Jacob Carstens and Koch and became a conspicuous exponent of the historic landscape. He devoted himself more particularly to landscape painting and to aquatint engraving. His paintings, drawings and etchings, of which he made many prints, brought him artistic recognition and financial success and he was eventually able to support a family. In 1801, he married an Italian Anna Caffo and together they had three children.

In 1829 he was asked by the future King Ludwig I of Bavaria to paint the view of Rome to the north, the south, the east and the west of the royal villa, high up on the Pincio. The paintings that resulted measure roughly 67 by 106 inches apiece and show a remarkable steadiness of hand and eye. These works are now housed in the Neue Pinakothek.

=== Assessment ===
Reinhart's originality lay not so much in radical inventions but rather in new combinations of known styles, themes, and patterns. By merging these with a noble theme, Reinhart revitalised the heroic landscape.

He developed a new, more sensitive approach to landscape. Even though this emotional tendency contains element of the early romantic, Reinhart's way of painting is still immersed in the classical and is meticulous and detailed.

== Works ==
His best known work is represented by the "Eight Historic Landscapes" (1825), in the Palazzo Massimi, Rome, and "Four Views from Villa Malta," in tempera, painted for King Ludwig I of Bavaria. The New Pinakothek in Munich contains "Four Views Near Rome" (two dated 1836, 1846), the Leipzig Museum a "Wood on Seashore in a Storm" (1824) and "Landscape with Psyche" (1829), the Städel Institute, Frankfurt, a landscape with "Cain and Abel," and the Cologne Museum a "View from Tivoli." To a collection of 72 etchings of prospects in Italy, published conjointly with Dies and Mechan under the title Malerisch radirte Prospecte aus Italien (1792–98) Reinhart contributed 24 plates. Besides these he etched many other Italian landscapes, and 38 animal studies, in all 170 plates.
