= Jens Peter Larsen =

Danish musicologist (1902–1988)

- Born: 14 June 1902
- Died: 22 August 1988 (aged 86)
- Occupations: Musicologist; scholar
- Style: Baroque; classical

Jens Peter Larsen (14 June 1902 – 22 August 1988) was a Danish musicologist and Joseph Haydn scholar. In addition to serving as general editor of two major editions of Haydn's music, he researched and published important papers on the works of George Frideric Handel's music and on the stylistic authenticity of Baroque and Classical performances.
