= Georg Solti discography =

Recording discography of the conductor Sir Georg Solti

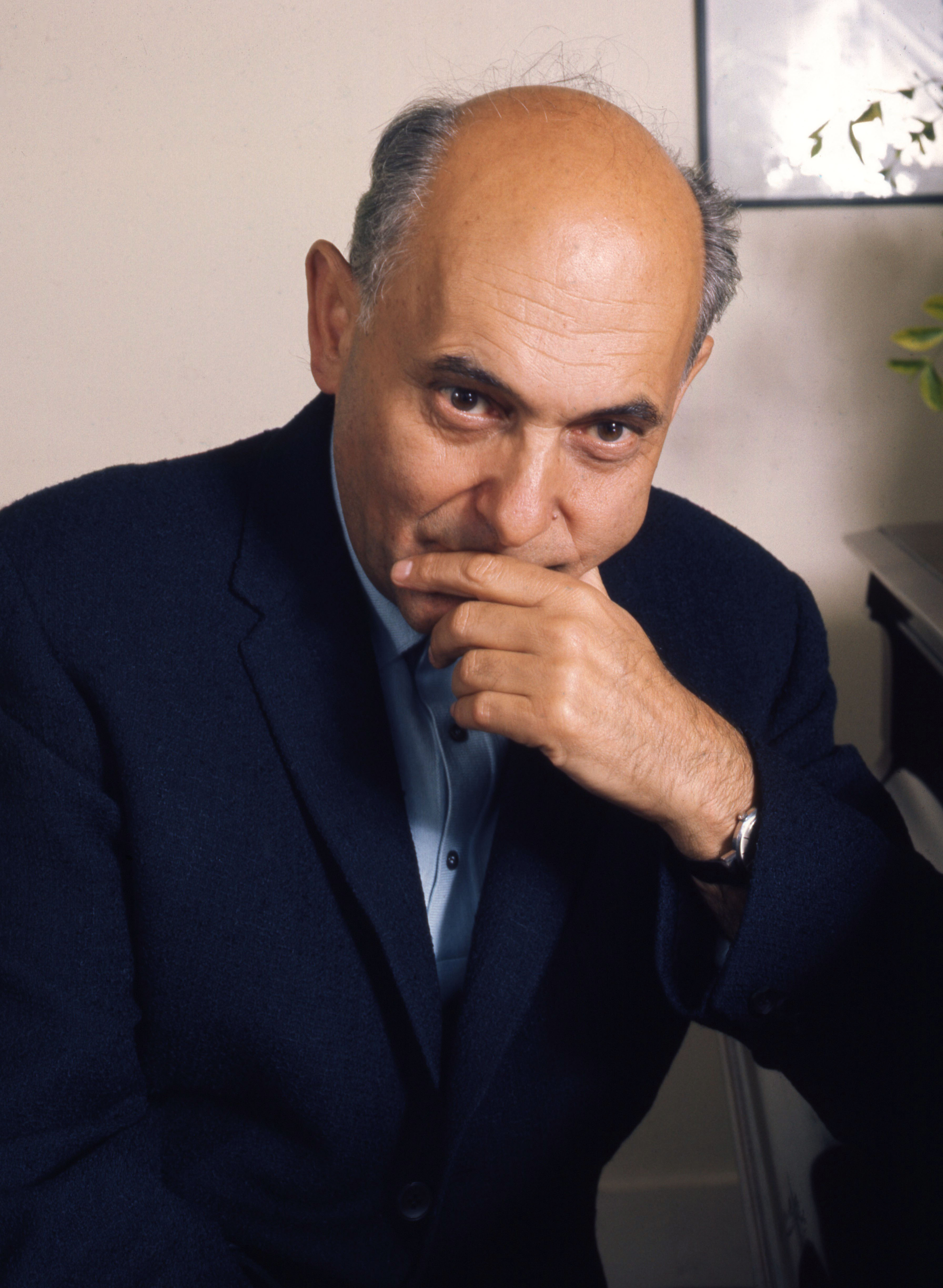
Solti in 1975

The conductor Sir Georg Solti recorded throughout his career for the British Decca Record Company. During the 1950s and 1960s, Decca had an alliance with RCA Victor in the United States; some of Solti's Decca recordings were first issued on the RCA Victor label.

== Overview ==
Solti's first recordings were as a piano accompanist, playing at sessions in Zürich for the violinist Georg Kulenkampff in 1947. Decca's senior producer, Victor Olof, did not much admire Solti as a conductor (nor did Walter Legge, Olof's opposite number at EMI's Columbia Records), but Olof's younger colleague at Decca John Culshaw held Solti in high regard. With Culshaw, and later James Walker, producing his recordings, Solti's career as a recording artist flourished.

Solti's most celebrated recording was Wagner's Der Ring des Nibelungen made in Vienna, with Culshaw producing, between 1958 and 1965. It has twice been voted the greatest recording ever made, the first poll being of readers of Gramophone magazine in 1999, and the second of professional music critics in 2011, carried out for the BBC.

For Decca, Solti made more than 250 recordings, including 45 complete opera sets. Among the international honours given for his recordings were 31 Grammy awards – more than any other recording artist, whether classical or popular.

== Discography ==
In entries below for operas, only the singers of the leading roles are listed. Where Solti appears as pianist rather than a conductor his name is given in the soloists column. Recording dates are shown by year followed by month, to enable sorting, using the arrows in the column headings.

Abbreviations:

- BPO – Berlin Philharmonic
- CSC – Chicago Symphony Chorus
- CSO – Chicago Symphony Orchestra
- LPC – London Philharmonic Choir
- LPO – London Philharmonic Orchestra
- LSC – London Symphony Chorus
- LSO – London Symphony Orchestra
- ROHC – Royal Opera House Chorus
- ROHO – Royal Opera House Orchestra
- VPO – Vienna Philharmonic

Awards:

- G - Grammy Award
- N - Grammy Nominee

Composer	Work	Soloists	Chorus	Orchestra	Date	Awards	Notes
Brahms	Violin Sonata No. 1	Georg Kulenkampff, Georg Solti			1947-01		
Beethoven	Violin Sonata No. 9	Georg Kulenkampff, Georg Solti			1947-06		
Schubert	Schwanengesang	Max Lichtegg, Georg Solti			1947-06		
Beethoven	Egmont Overture			Tonhalle Orchester Zürich	1947-06		
Brahms	Violin Sonata No. 2	Georg Kulenkampff, Georg Solti			1948-07		
Brahms	Violin Sonata No. 3	Georg Kulenkampff, Georg Solti			1948-07		
Mozart	Violin Sonata K454	Georg Kulenkampff, Georg Solti			1948-07		
Haydn	Symphony No. 103			LPO	1949-08		
Verdi	La forza del destino Overture			LPO	1949-08		
Beethoven	Symphony No. 4			LPO	1950-11		
Suppé	Die Leichte Kavallerie Overture			LPO	1951-04		
Suppé	Pique Dame Overture			LPO	1951-04		
Suppé	Ein Morgen, ein Mittag, ein Abend in Wien			LPO	1951-04		
Suppé	Dichter und Bauer Overture			LPO	1951-04		
Haydn	Symphony No. 102			LPO	1951-11		
Strauss, R	Elektra – Ich will nichts hören; Was willst du, fremder Mensch?	Christel Goltz, Elisabeth Höngen, Ferdinand Frantz		Bayerisches Staatsorchester	1952-08		Deutsche Grammophon by arrangement with Decca
Bartók	Dance Suite			LPO	1952-11		
Kodály	Dances of Galánta			LPO	1952-11		
Mendelssohn	Symphony No. 3			LSO	1952-11		
Haydn	Symphony No. 100			LPO	1954-04		
Mozart	Symphony No. 38			LSO	1954-04		
Mozart	Symphony No. 25			LSO	1954-04		
Kodály	Psalmus Hungaricus	William McAlpine	LPC	LPO	1954-04 & 05		Naxos Classical Archives 9.80303
Kodály	Variations on a Hungarian Folksong "The Peacock"	William McAlpine	LPC	LPO	1954-04 & 05		
Brahms	Requiem	Lore Wissmann, Theo Adam	Frankfurt Opera Chorus	Frankfurt Opera Orchestra	1954-11		Capitol Records by arrangement with Decca
Bartók	Music for Strings, Percussion and Celesta			LPO	1955-02		
Kodály	Háry János Suite			LPO	1955-02		
Rossini	L'italiana in Algeri Overture			LPO	1955-02 & 04		
Rossini	Il barbiere di Siviglia Overture			LPO	1955-02 & 04		
Beethoven	Violin Concerto	Mischa Elman		LPO	1955-04		
Tchaikovsky	Symphony No. 2			Paris Conservatoire Orchestra	1956-05		
Tchaikovsky	Eugene Onegin – Letter Scene	Renata Tebaldi		Chicago Lyric Opera	1956-11		Live
Boito	Mefistofele – L'altra notte	Renata Tebaldi		Chicago Lyric Opera	1956-11		Live
Ponchielli	La gioconda – L'amo come il fulgor	Renata Tebaldi, Giulietta Simionato		Chicago Lyric Opera	1956-11		Live
Mozart	Le nozze di Figaro – Voi che sapete	Giulietta Simionato		Chicago Lyric Opera	1956-11		Live
Saint-Saëns	Samson et Dalila – Mon cœur	Giulietta Simionato		Chicago Lyric Opera	1956-11		Live
Mascagni	Cavalleria rusticana – Voi lo sapete	Giulietta Simionato		Chicago Lyric Opera	1956-11		Live
Giordano	Andrea Chénier – Nemico della patria	Ettore Bastianini		Chicago Lyric Opera	1956-11		Live
Rossini-Respighi	La boutique fantasque			Israel Philharmonic Orchestra	1957-03		
Dukas	L'apprenti sorcier			Israel Philharmonic Orchestra	1957-03		
Wagner	Die Walküre Act II (excerpt); Act III	Kirsten Flagstad, Set Svanholm, Otto Edelmann, Marianne Schech		VPO	1957-05		
Strauss, R	Arabella	Otto Edelmann, Ira Malaniuk, Lisa Della Casa, Hilde Gueden, George London, Anton Dermota	Vienna State Opera Chorus	VPO	1957-05 & 06		
Mendelssohn	Symphony No. 4			Israel Philharmonic Orchestra	1958-05		
Schubert	Symphony No. 5			Israel Philharmonic Orchestra	1958-05		
Tchaikovsky	Serenade for Strings			Israel Philharmonic Orchestra	1958-05		
Mozart	Serenade No. 13			Israel Philharmonic Orchestra	1958-05		
Rachmaninoff	Piano Concerto No. 2	Julius Katchen		LSO	1958-06		
Offenbach	Les contes d'Hoffmann – Barcarolle			ROHO	1958-06		
Ponchielli	La gioconda – Dance of the Hours			ROHO	1958-06		
Rossini	L'italiana in Algeri Overture			ROHO	1958-06		
Rossini	Semiramide Overture			ROHO	1958-06		
Verdi	La traviata Preludes to Acts I and III			ROHO	1958-06		
Beethoven	Symphony No. 5			VPO	1958-09 & 10		
Beethoven	Symphony No. 7			VPO	1958-09 & 10		
Wagner	Das Rheingold	George London, Set Svanholm, Gustav Neidlinger, Paul Kuen, Kirsten Flagstad, Claire Watson		VPO	1958-09 & 10		
Tchaikovsky	Piano Concerto No. 1	Clifford Curzon		VPO	1958-10		
Beethoven	Symphony No. 3			VPO	1959-05		
Suppé	Dichter und Bauer Overture			VPO	1959-05		
Suppé	Pique Dame Overture			VPO	1959-05		
Suppé	Ein Morgen, ein Mittag, ein Abend in Wien			VPO	1959-05		
Suppé	Die Leichte Kavallerie Overture			VPO	1959-05		
Borodin	Prince Igor Overture			BPO	1959-06		
Glinka	Russlan and Ludmilla Overture			BPO	1959-06		
Mussorgsky	Khovanshchina Prelude			BPO	1959-06		
Mussorgsky	Khovanshchina – Dance of the Persian Slaves			BPO	1959-06		
Mussorgsky	Night on the Bare Mountain			BPO	1959-06		
Gounod	Faust – Ballet Music			ROHO	1960-01		
Offenbach, arr. Rosenthal	Gaîté parisienne			ROHO	1960-05		
Verdi	Un ballo in maschera	Birgit Nilsson, Sylvia Stahlman, Giulietta Simionato, Carlo Bergonzi, Cornell MacNeil, Fernando Corena	Santa Cecilia Academy Chorus	Santa Cecilia Academy Orchestra	1960-07 and 1961-07		
Wagner	Tristan und Isolde	Fritz Uhl, Birgit Nilsson, Arnold van Mill, Tom Krause, Regina Resnik	Vienna Singverein	VPO	1960-09		
Mahler	Symphony No. 4	Sylvia Stahlman		Concertgebouw Orchestra	1961-02		
Verdi	Aida	Leontyne Price, Rita Gorr, Jon Vickers, Robert Merrill	Rome Opera Chorus	Rome Opera Orchestra	1961-06 & 07		
Wagner	Tannhäuser Overture and Venusberg Music			VPO	1961-10		
Wagner	Rienzi Overture			VPO	1961-10		
Wagner	Der fliegende Holländer Overture			VPO	1961-10		
Strauss, R	Salome	Birgit Nilsson, Gerhard Stolze, Grace Hoffman, Eberhard Waechter, Waldemar Kmentt		VPO	1961-10		
Wagner	Siegfried	Wolfgang Windgassen, Hans Hotter, Birgit Nilsson, Gerhard Stolze		VPO	1962-05 & 10 & 11		
Verdi	Falstaff	Geraint Evans, Robert Merrill, Alfredo Kraus, Ilva Ligabue, Mirella Freni, Giulietta Simionato	RCA Italiana Chorus	RCA Italiana Orchestra	1963-07		Rome Opera Chorus and Orchestra performing pseudonymously
Stravinsky	The Rite of Spring			VPO	1963-09		Unpublished
Bartók	Music for Strings, Percussion and Celesta			LSO	1963-12		
Bartók	The Miraculous Mandarin – Ballet			LSO	1963-12		
Mahler	Symphony No. 1			LSO	1964-01 & 02		
Wagner	Götterdämmerung	Wolfgang Windgassen, Dietrich Fischer-Dieskau, Gustav Neidlinger, Gottlob Frick, Birgit Nilsson, Claire Watson, Christa Ludwig	Vienna State Opera Chorus	VPO	1964-10 & 11		
Bartók	Concerto for Orchestra			LSO	1965-02		
Bartók	Dance Suite			LSO	1965-05		
Verdi	Don Carlos	Carlo Bergonzi, Nicolai Ghiaurov, Dietrich Fischer-Dieskau, Martti Talvela, Renata Tebaldi, Grace Bumbry	ROHC	ROHO	1965-06 & 07		
Bruckner	Symphony No. 7			VPO	1965-10		
Wagner	Die Walküre	James King, Gottlob Frick, Hans Hotter, Régine Crespin, Birgit Nilsson, Christa Ludwig		VPO	1965-10 & 11		
Wagner	Siegfried Idyll			VPO	1965-11		
Borodin	Prince Igor Overture			LSO	1966-01 & 02		
Glinka	Russlan and Ludmilla Overture			LSO	1966-01 & 02		
Mussorgsky	Khovanshchina Prelude			LSO	1966-01 & 02		
Mussorgsky	Night on the Bare Mountain			LSO	1966-01 & 02		
Brahms	Symphony No. 1			LSO	1966-01 & 02		Unpublished
Borodin	Prince Igor, Polovtsian Dances			LSO	1966-05		
Liadov	The Enchanted Lake			LSO	1966-05		
Mahler	Symphony No. 2	Heather Harper, Helen Watts	LSC	LSO	1966-05		
Strauss, R	Elektra	Birgit Nilsson, Regina Resnik, Marie Collier, Gerhard Stolze, Tom Krause	Vienna State Opera Chorus	VPO	1966-06 & 09 & 11 and 1967-02 & 06		
Bruckner	Symphony No. 8			VPO	1966-11 &12		
Mahler	Symphony No. 9			LSO	1967-04 & 05		
Verdi	Requiem	Joan Sutherland, Marilyn Horne, Luciano Pavarotti, Martti Talvela	Vienna State Opera Chorus	VPO	1967-11		
Schumann	Symphony No. 3			VPO	1967-11		
Schumann	Symphony No. 4			VPO	1967-11		
Mahler	Symphony No. 3	Helen Watts	Wandsworth School Boys' Choir, Ambrosian Opera Chorus	LSO	1968-01		
Britten	A Midsummer Night's Dream – Helena! Hermia!	Anne Howells, Elizabeth Robson, Kenneth McDonald, Delme Bryn-Jones		ROHO	1968-02		Covent Garden 21st Anniversary Gala
Beethoven	Fidelio – Mir ist so wunderbar	Gwyneth Jones, John Dobson, Elizabeth Robson, David Kelly		ROHO	1968-02		Covent Garden 21st Anniversary Gala
Bizet	Carmen Prelude to Act I			ROHO	1968-02		Covent Garden 21st Anniversary Gala
Britten	Billy Budd – O Beauty	Forbes Robinson		ROHO	1968-02		Covent Garden 21st Anniversary Gala
Mozart	Le nozze di Figaro – Dove sono	Joan Carlyle		ROHO	1968-02		Covent Garden 21st Anniversary Gala
Strauss, R	Der Rosenkavalier – Herr Kavalier!	Yvonne Minton, Michael Langdon		ROHO	1968-02		Covent Garden 21st Anniversary Gala
Verdi	Otello – Fuoco di gioia	Tito Gobbi, John Lanigan, John Dobson		ROHO	1968-02		Covent Garden 21st Anniversary Gala
Wagner	Kinderkatechismus		Wiener Sängerknaben	VPO	1968-03 & 04		
Strauss, R	Der Rosenkavalier	Régine Crespin, Manfred Jungwirth, Yvonne Minton, Otto Wiener, Helen Donath	Vienna State Opera Chorus	VPO	1968-10 & 11 and 1969-01& 06		
Gluck	Orfeo ed Euridice	Marilyn Horne, Pilar Lorengar, Helen Donath	ROHC	ROHO	1969-06 & 07		
Schumann	Symphony No. 1			VPO	1969-09		
Schumann	Symphony No. 2			VPO	1969-09		
Schumann	Overture, Scherzo and Finale			VPO	1969-09		
Schumann	Julius Cäsar – Overture			VPO	1969-09		
Mozart	Die Zauberflöte	Martti Talvela, Stuart Burrows, Dietrich Fischer-Dieskau, Cristina Deutekom, Pilar Lorengar	Wiener Sängerknaben, Vienna State Opera Chorus	VPO	1969-09 & 10		
Mahler	Symphony No. 5			CSO	1970-03 & 04		
Mahler	Des Knaben Wunderhorn – Four Songs	Yvonne Minton		CSO	1970-03 & 04		
Mahler	Lieder eines fahrenden Gesellen	Yvonne Minton		CSO	1970-03 & 04		
Mahler	Symphony No. 6 In A Minor			CSO	1970-03 & 04		
Wagner	Tannhäuser	Hans Sotin, René Kollo, Victor Braun, Werner Hollweg (de), Helga Dernesch, Christa Ludwig	Wiener Sängerknaben, Vienna State Opera Chorus	VPO	1970-10		
Beethoven	Piano Concerto No. 5	Vladimir Ashkenazy		CSO	1971-05		
Beethoven	Piano Concerto No. 3	Vladimir Ashkenazy		CSO	1971-05		
Mahler	Symphony No. 7			CSO	1971-05		
Mahler	Symphony No. 8	Heather Harper, Lucia Popp, Arleen Auger, Yvonne Minton, Helen Watts, René Kollo, John Shirley-Quirk, Martti Talvela	Wiener Sängerknaben, Vienna Singverein, Vienna State Opera Chorus	CSO	1971-08 & 09		
Wagner	Parsifal	René Kollo, Dietrich Fischer-Dieskau, Hans Hotter, Gottlob Frick, Zoltán Kélémen, Christa Ludwig	Wiener Sängerknaben, Vienna State Opera Chorus	VPO	1971-12 and 1972-02 & 06 & 11		
Elgar	Symphony No. 1			LPO	1972-02		
Mahler	Das Lied von der Erde	Yvonne Minton, René Kollo		CSO	1972-05		
Strauss, R	Don Juan			CSO	1972-05		
Wagner	Die Meistersinger – Prelude to Act I			CSO	1972-05		
Beethoven	Leonore Overture No. 3			CSO	1972-05		
Beethoven	Egmont Overture			CSO	1972-05		
Rossini	Il barbiere di Siviglia Overture			CSO	1972-05		
Beethoven	Piano Concerto No. 1	Vladimir Ashkenazy		CSO	1972-05		
Beethoven	Piano Concerto No. 2	Vladimir Ashkenazy		CSO	1972-05		
Beethoven	Piano Concerto No. 4	Vladimir Ashkenazy		CSO	1972-05		
Beethoven	Symphony No. 9	Pilar Lorengar, Yvonne Minton, Stuart Burrows, Martti Talvela	CSC	CSO	1972-05 & 06		
Berlioz	Symphonie fantastique			CSO	1972-05 & 06		
Mozart	Così fan tutte	Ryland Davies, Tom Krause, Gabriel Bacquier, Pilar Lorengar, Teresa Berganza, Jane Berbié	ROHC	LPO	1973-07 & 10 and 1974-02		
Puccini	La bohème	Plácido Domingo, Montserrat Caballé, Sherrill Milnes, Judith Blegen, Ruggero Raimondi	Wandsworth School Boys' Choir, John Alldis Choir	LPO	1974 ?		Released 1974-10
Beethoven	Symphony No. 5			CSO	1974-05		
Beethoven	Symphony No. 3			CSO	1974-05		
Beethoven	Symphony No. 8			CSO	1974-05		
Weber	Oberon Overture			CSO	1974-05		
Berlioz	Les Francs-Juges (fr) Overture			CSO	1974-05		
Beethoven	Symphony No. 1			CSO	1974-05		
Beethoven	Symphony No. 2			CSO	1974-05		
Beethoven	Symphony No. 4			CSO	1974-05		
Stravinsky	The Rite of Spring			CSO	1974-05		
Bach	Suite No. 3 – Air			CSO	1974-05		
Elgar	Enigma Variations			CSO	1974-05		
Liszt	Tasso, lamento e trionfo			Paris Orchestra	1974-05 & 06		
Liszt	Von der Wiege bis zum Grabe (de)			Paris Orchestra	1974-05 & 06		
Tchaikovsky	Eugene Onegin	Anna Reynolds, Teresa Kubiak (pl), Julia Hamari, Bernd Weikl, Stuart Burrows, Nicolai Ghiaurov	John Alldis Choir	ROHO	1974-06 & 07		
Beethoven	Symphony No. 6			CSO	1974-09		
Beethoven	Symphony No. 7			CSO	1974-09		
Beethoven	Coriolan Overture			CSO	1974-09		
Elgar	Symphony No. 2			LPO	1975-02	N	
Strauss, R	Till Eulenspiegel			CSO	1975-05		
Strauss, R	Also sprach Zarathustra			CSO	1975-05	G	
Schoenberg	Variations for Orchestra			CSO	1975-05		
Tchaikovsky	Symphony No. 5			CSO	1975-05		
Bizet	Carmen	Tatiana Troyanos, Kiri Te Kanawa, Plácido Domingo, José van Dam	Haberdashers' Aske's Boys' School Choir, John Alldis Choir	LPO and National Philharmonic	1975-07 & 12	N	The LPO was unavailable for some sessions and the Nat Phil played instead
Wagner	Die Meistersinger	Norman Bailey, Kurt Moll, Bernd Weikl, René Kollo, Adolf Dallapozza, Hannelore Bode, Julia Hamari	Vienna State Opera Chorus	VPO	1975-09 & 10 and 1976-03		
Bartók	Violin Concerto No. 2	Kyung-Wha Chung		LPO	1976-02		
Elgar	Cockaigne Overture			LPO	1976-02		
Stravinsky	Oedipus Rex	Alec McCowen, Peter Pears, Kerstin Meyer, Donald McIntyre, Stafford Dean	John Alldis Choir	LPO	1976-03		
Wagner	Der fliegende Holländer	Norman Bailey, Martti Talvela, Janis Martin, René Kollo	CSC	CSO	1976-05		
Ravel	Boléro			CSO	1976-05	G,N,N	
Debussy	La mer			CSO	1976-05		
Debussy	Prélude à l'après-midi d'un faune			CSO	1976-05	N	
Tchaikovsky	Symphony No. 6			CSO	1976-05		
Wagner	Die Meistersinger Prelude to Act I			CSO	1976-06		
Wagner	Tannhäuser Overture			CSO	1976-06		
Wagner	Der fliegende Holländer Overture			CSO	1976-06	N	
Wagner	Tristan und Isolde Prelude and Liebestod			CSO	1976-06		
Mendelssohn	Symphony No. 4			CSO	1976-06		
Strauss, R	Arabella	Hans Kraemmer, Margarita Lilowa, Gundula Janowitz, Sona Ghazarian, Bernd Weikl, René Kollo	Vienna State Opera Chorus	VPO	1977-01 & 02		Video
Elgar	Violin Concerto	Kyung-Wha Chung		LPO	1977-02		
Elgar	Pomp and Circumstance Marches 1–5			LPO	1977-02 & 03		
Walton	Belshazzar's Feast	Benjamin Luxon	LPC	LPO	1977-03	N	
Walton	Coronation Te Deum		Choirs of Chichester, Salisbury and Winchester Cathedrals	LPO	1977-03		
Strauss, R	Ein Heldenleben			VPO	1977-03 and 1978-03		
Verdi	Quattro pezzi sacri	Jo Ann Pickens	CSC	CSO	1977-03 and 1978-05		
Elgar (arr)	God Save the Queen			LPO	1977-04		
Liszt	Les Préludes			LPO	1977-04 & 06		
Liszt	Prometheus			LPO	1977-04 & 06		
Liszt	Festklänge			LPO	1977-04 & 06		
Beethoven	Missa Solemnis	Lucia Popp, Yvonne Minton, Mallory Walker, Gwynne Howell	CSC	CSO	1977-05	G	
Wagner	Tristan und Isolde – Prelude and Liebestod			CSO	1977-05		
Wagner	Tannhäuser Overture			CSO	1977-05		
Brahms	Variations on a Theme of Haydn			CSO	1977-05		
Verdi	Requiem	Leontyne Price, Dame Janet Baker, Veriano Luchetti, José van Dam	CSC	CSO	1977-06	G	Recorded and issued by RCA by arrangement with Decca
Verdi	Otello	Carlo Cossutta, Gabriel Bacquier, Peter Dvorský, Margaret Price, Jane Berbié	Wiener Sängerknaben, Vienna State Opera Chorus	VPO	1977-09		
Berlioz	Roméo et Juliette, excerpts			CSO	1977-10		Video, Live
Strauss	Tod und Verklärung			CSO	1977-10		Video, Live
Strauss	Till Eulenspiegel			CSO	1977-10		Video, Live
Strauss, R	Vier letzte Lieder	Lucia Popp		CSO	1977-10		Video, Live
Mussorgsky	Khovanshchina Prelude			CSO	1977-10		Video, Live
Prokofiev	Classical Symphony			CSO	1977-10		Video, Live
Shostakovich	Symphony No. 1			CSO	1977-10		Video, Live
Strauss, R	Ariadne auf Naxos	Tatiana Troyanos, Edita Gruberová, René Kollo, Barry McDaniel, Walter Berry		LPO	1977-11 & 12 and 1978-02 & 10		
Mozart	Piano Concerto No. 27	Alicia de Larrocha		LPO	1977-12		
Mozart	Piano Concerto No. 25	Alicia de Larrocha		LPO	1977-12		
Bartók	Piano Concerto No. 3	Vladimir Ashkenazy		LPO	1978-02		
Holst	The Planets		LPC	LPO	1978-02	N	
Humperdinck	Hänsel und Gretel	Brigitte Fassbaender, Lucia Popp, Walter Berry, Julia Hamari, Anny Schlemm	Wiener Sängerknaben	VPO	1978-02 & 03 & 06 & 09		
Brahms	Ein deutsches Requiem	Kiri Te Kanawa, Bernd Weikl	CSC	CSO	1978-05	G	
Brahms	Symphony No. 3			CSO	1978-05	G,G	
Brahms	Symphony No. 4			CSO	1978-05	G,G	
Brahms	Academic Festival Overture			CSO	1978-05		
Brahms	Tragic Overture			CSO	1978-05		
Beethoven	Symphony No. 1			CSO	1978-09		Video. Live
Bruckner	Symphony No. 7			CSO	1978-09		Video. Live
Verdi	Falstaff	Gabriel Bacquier, Richard Stilwell, Max-René Cosotti, Karan Armstrong, Jutta-Renate Ihloff, Márta Szirmay (hu)	Deutsche Oper Berlin Chorus, Vienna State Opera Chorus	VPO	1978-10		Soundtrack for video
Mozart	Don Giovanni	Bernd Weikl, Gabriel Bacquier, Margaret Price, Kurt Moll, Stuart Burrows, Sylvia Sass, Lucia Popp, Alfred Sramek (de)	London Opera Chorus	London Philharmonic Orchestra	1978-10 & 11		
Rossini	Il barbiere di Siviglia Overture			CSO	1978-12		Video
Rossini	La gazza ladra Overture			CSO	1978-12		Video
Rossini	L'italiana in Algeri Overture			CSO	1978-12		Video
Rossini	La scala di seta Overture			CSO	1978-12		Video
Rossini	Semiramide Overture			CSO	1978-12		Video
Rossini	Le siège de Corinthe Overture			CSO	1978-12		Video
Brahms	Symphony No. 1			CSO	1979-01	G,G	
Bartók	Bluebeard's Castle	Kolos Kováts, Sylvia Sass, István Sztankay (hu)		LPO	1979-03	N	
Beethoven	Fidelio	Hildegard Behrens, Theo Adam, Peter Hofmann, Hans Sotin	CSC	CSO	1979-03		
Bartók	Piano Concerto No. 2	Vladimir Ashkenazy		LPO	1979-03 and 1980-02		
Bruckner	Symphony No. 6			CSO	1979-05	G,N	
Tippett	Symphony No. 4			CSO	1979-06 & 10		
Strauss	Eine Alpensinfonie			Bavarian Radio Symphony Orchestra	1979-09		
Mozart	Symphony No. 40			Bavarian Radio Symphony Orchestra	1979-09		Unpublished
Mozart	Symphony No. 41			Bavarian Radio Symphony Orchestra	1979-09		Unpublished
Brahms	Symphony No. 2			CSO	1979-1	G,G	
Mendelssohn	Violin Concerto	Kyung-Wha Chung		CSO	1979-10		Video. Live
Mendelssohn	Symphony No. 3			CSO	1979-10		Video. Live
Bruckner	Symphony No. 6			CSO	1979-10		Video. Live
Del Tredici	Final Alice	Barbara Hendricks		CSO	1979-10 and 1980-01		
Britten	The Young Person's Guide to the Orchestra			CSO	1979-10 and 1980-01		Unpublished
Elgar	In the South			LPO	1979-12		
Elgar	Falstaff			LPO	1979-12		
Haydn	Symphony No. 96			LPO	1979-12		
Haydn	Symphony No. 101			LPO	1979-12		
Bach	Brandenburg Concerto No. 1			CSO	1980-01		Unpublished
Bach	Brandenburg Concerto No. 2			CSO	1980-01		Unpublished
Bruckner	Symphony No. 5			CSO	1980-01		
Mahler	Symphony No. 2	Isobel Buchanan, Mira Zakai	CSC	CSO	1980-05	G,G	
Mussorgsky–Ravel	Pictures at an Exhibition			CSO	1980-05		
Ravel	Le tombeau de Couperin			CSO	1980-05		
Humperdinck	Hänsel und Gretel	Brigitte Fassbaender, Edita Gruberová, Hermann Prey, Helga Dernesch, Sena Jurinac	Wiener Sängerknaben	VPO	1980-06 & 09		Soundtrack for video
Liszt	Les préludes			Bavarian Radio Symphony Orchestra	1980-12		Video. Live
Smetana	Má Vlast No. 2 "Vltava"			Bavarian Radio Symphony Orchestra	1980-12		Video. Live
Strauss, R	Don Juan			Bavarian Radio Symphony Orchestra	1980-12		Video. Live
Bartók	Dance Suite			CSO	1981-01		
Bartók	Concerto for Orchestra			CSO	1981-01		
Tippett	Suite for the Birthday of Prince Charles			CSO	1981-01		
Bruckner	Symphony No. 4			CSO	1981-01		
Bartók	Piano Concerto No. 1	Vladimir Ashkenazy		LPO	1981-04		
Berlioz	La damnation de Faust	Frederica von Stade, Kenneth Riegel (de), José van Dam	CSC	CSO	1981-05	G,N	For details, see La damnation de Faust (Georg Solti recording)
Mozart	Le nozze di Figaro	Thomas Allen, Kiri Te Kanawa, Lucia Popp, Samuel Ramey, Frederica von Stade	London Opera Chorus	LPO	1981-05 & 06 & 12	G	For details, see Le nozze di Figaro (Georg Solti recording)
Schubert	Symphony No. 9			VPO	1981-06		
Haydn	Die Schöpfung	Norma Burrowes, Rüdiger Wohlers (de), James Morris, Sylvia Greenberg (de), Siegmund Nimsgern	CSC	CSO	1981-11	G	
Haydn	Symphony No. 102			LPO	1981-12		
Haydn	Symphony No. 103			LPO	1981-12		
Mozart	Symphony No. 38			CSO	1982-04 & 05		
Mozart	Symphony No. 39			CSO	1982-04 & 05		
Mahler	Symphony No. 9			CSO	1982-05	G,G,G	
Prokofiev	Symphony No. 1			CSO	1982-05		
Prokofiev	Romeo and Juliet – excerpts			CSO	1982-05		
Verdi	Un ballo in maschera	Margaret Price, Kathleen Battle, Christa Ludwig, Luciano Pavarotti, Renato Bruson	London Opera Chorus	National Philharmonic Orchestra	1982-05 & 06 and 1983-05	N	
Brahms	Variations on a Theme by Haydn	Murray Perahia, Sir Georg Solti			1982-09		CBS recording by arrangement with Decca
Wagner	Das Rheingold – Entrance of the Gods into Valhalla			VPO	1982-10		
Wagner	Die Walküre – Ride of the Valkyries			VPO	1982-10		
Wagner	Die Walküre – Wotan's Farewell and Magic Fire Music			VPO	1982-10		
Wagner	Siegfried – Forest Murmurs			VPO	1982-10		
Wagner	Götterdämmerung – Siegfried's Funeral March, and Finale			VPO	1982-10		
Mahler	Symphony No. 3	Helga Dernesch	Glen Ellyn Children's Chorus, CSC	CSO	1982-11		
Dvořák	Symphony No. 9			CSO	1983-01		
Mahler	Symphony No. 4	Kiri Te Kanawa		CSO	1983-04	N	
Wagner	Der Ring des Nibelungen	Hildegard Behrens, Siegfried Jerusalem et al.	Bayreuth Festival Chorus	Bayreuth Festival Orchestra	1983-07 & 08		Live.
Bartók	Violin Concerto No. 1	Kyung-Wha Chung		CSO	1983-10		
Mahler	Symphony No. 1			CSO	1983-10		
Berg	Violin Concerto	Kyung-Wha Chung		CSO	1983-10		
Haydn	Symphony No. 94			LPO	1983-11 & 12		
Puccini	Tosca	Kiri Te Kanawa, Giacomo Aragall, Leo Nucci, Malcolm King	Welsh National Opera Chorus	National Philharmonic Orchestra	1984-02 & 03 & 05		
Schoenberg	Moses und Aron	Franz Mazura, Philip Langridge, Aage Haugland, Barbara Bonney	Glen Ellyn Children's Chorus, CSC	CSO	1984-04 & 05	G	
Tchaikovsky	Symphony No. 4			CSO	1984-05		
Mozart	Piano Quartet K478	Sir Georg Solti, Melos String Quartet			1984-06		
Mozart	Symphony No. 40			Chamber Orchestra of Europe	1984-06		
Mozart	Symphony No. 41			Chamber Orchestra of Europe	1984-06		
Schubert	Symphony No. 5			VPO	1984-09		
Schubert	Symphony No. 8			VPO	1984-09		
Handel	Messiah	Kiri Te Kanawa, Anne Gjevang, Keith Lewis, Gwynne Howell	CSC	CSO	1984-10		
Mozart	Die Entführung aus dem Serail	Edita Gruberová, Kathleen Battle, Gösta Winbergh, Heinz Zednik, Martti Talvela	Vienna State Opera Concert Choir	VPO	1984-11 and 1985-12	N	
Mozart	Piano Concerto No. 24	Alicia de Larrocha		Chamber Orchestra of Europe	1985-03		
Mozart	Piano Concerto No. 26	Alicia de Larrocha		Chamber Orchestra of Europe	1985-03		
Mendelssohn	Symphony No. 3			CSO	1985-04	N	
Mendelssohn	Symphony No. 4			CSO	1985-04	N	
Haydn	Symphony No. 104			LPO	1985-05		
Bruckner	Symphony No. 9			CSO	1985-09 &10		
Mozart	Piano Quartet, K493	Sir Georg Solti, Melos String Quartet			1985-10		
Tchaikovsky	Piano Concerto No. 1	András Schiff		CSO	1985-10		
Dohnányi	Variations on a Nursery Song	András Schiff		CSO	1985-10		
Wagner	Lohengrin	Plácido Domingo, Jessye Norman, Siegmund Nimsgern, Eva Randová, Hans Sotin, Dietrich Fischer-Dieskau	Vienna State Opera Concert Choir	VPO	1985-11 & 12 and 1986-06	G,N	
Liszt	A Faust Symphony	Siegfried Jerusalem	CSC	CSO	1986-01	G	
Sousa	The Stars and Stripes Forever			CSO	1986-01		
Smith-Stock	The Star-Spangled Banner		CSC	CSO	1986-01		
Downs	Bear Down, Chicago Bears		CSC	CSO	1986-01		
Tchaikovsky	Romeo and Juliet			CSO	1986-01		
Tchaikovsky	1812 Overture			CSO	1986-01		
Tchaikovsky	The Nutcracker Suite			CSO	1986-01		
Beethoven	Symphony No. 9	Jessye Norman, Reinhild Runkel, Robert Schunk, Hans Sotin	CSC	CSO	1986-09	G,N	
Beethoven	Symphony No. 5			CSO	1986-10		
Bruckner	Symphony No. 7			CSO	1986-10	N	
Haydn	Symphony No. 99			LPO	1986-11		
Schubert, arr Liszt	Wanderer Fantasie	Jorge Bolet		LPO	1986-7		
Liszt	Piano Concerto No. 1	Jorge Bolet		LPO	1986-7		
Liszt	Piano Concerto No. 2	Jorge Bolet		LPO	1986-7		
Bach	St Matthew Passion	Kiri Te Kanawa, Anne Sofie Von Otter, Anthony Rolfe Johnson, Hans Peter Blochwitz, Olaf Bär, Tom Krause	Glen Ellyn Children's Chorus, CSC	CSO	1987-03	N	
Haydn	Symphony No. 93			LPO	1987-04 & 05		
Beethoven	Symphony No. 4			CSO	1987-09		
Tchaikovsky	Symphony No. 5			CSO	1987-09		
Bartók	Sonata for Two Pianos and Percussion	Murray Perahia, Sir Georg Solti			1987-10(?)	G	CBS recording by arrangement with Decca
Brahms	Variations on a Theme by Schumann	András Schiff, Sir Georg Solti			1988-04		
Brahms	Piano Concerto No. 1	András Schiff		VPO	1988-04		
Beethoven	Symphony No. 6			CSO	1988-05		
Beethoven	Leonore Overture No. 3			CSO	1988-05		
Beethoven	Symphony No. 7			CSO	1988-05 and 1988-10	N	
Beethoven	Symphony No. 8			CSO	1988-05 and 1988-10	N	
Tchaikovsky	Swan Lake Suite			CSO	1988-10		
Verdi	Simon Boccanegra	Leo Nucci, Kiri Te Kanawa, Giacomo Aragall, Paata Burchuladze, Paolo Coni (it)	La Scala Chorus	La Scala Orchestra	1988-12		
Shostakovich	Symphony No. 8			CSO	1989-02		Live
Strauss, R	Die Frau ohne Schatten	Plácido Domingo, Júlia Várady, José van Dam, Hildegard Behrens, Sumi Jo	Wiener Sängerknaben, Vienna State Opera Chorus	VPO	1989-03 & 04 & 09 &10 and 1991-10		
Beethoven	Symphony No. 3			CSO	1989-05		
Bartók	The Miraculous Mandarin Suite			CSO	1989-05 & 11 and 1990-02		
Bartók	Music for Strings, Percussion and Celesta			CSO	1989-05 & 11 and 1990-02		
Mozart	Triple Piano Concerto K242	Daniel Barenboim, András Schiff, Sir Georg Solti		English Chamber Orchestra	1989-06		
Mozart	Double Piano Concerto K365	Daniel Barenboim, Sir Georg Solti		English Chamber Orchestra	1989-06		
Mozart	Piano Concerto No. 20	Sir Georg Solti		English Chamber Orchestra	1989-06		
Berlioz	La damnation de Faust	Anne Sofie von Otter, Keith Lewis, José van Dam, Peter Roser	CSC	CSO	1989-08		Video
Haydn	Symphony No. 100			LPO	1989-10		
Haydn	Symphony No. 97			LPO	1989-10		
Verdi	Fifteen operatic choruses		CSC	CSO	1989-11		
Verdi	Requiem – Sanctus		CSC	CSO	1989-11		
Bruckner	Symphony No. 8			CSO	1989-11		Unpublished
Beethoven	Egmont Overture			CSO	1989-11 and 1990-01		
Beethoven	Symphony No. 1			CSO	1989-11 and 1990-01		
Beethoven	Symphony No. 2			CSO	1989-11 and 1990-01		
Debussy	Nocturnes		CSC	CSO	1990-01		Live
Bartók	Divertimento			CSO	1990-01		
Bach	Mass in B minor	Felicity Lott, Anne Sofie von Otter, Hans Peter Blochwitz, William Shimell, Gwynne Howell	CSC	CSO	1990-01	G	Live
Beethoven	Symphony No. 5			VPO	1990-05		Live
Shostakovich	Symphony No. 9			VPO	1990-05		Live
Mozart	Die Zauberflöte	Kurt Moll, Uwe Heilmann, Andreas Schmidt, Sumi Jo, Ruth Ziesak, Michael Kraus, Lotte Leitner	Wiener Sängerknaben, Vienna State Opera Concert Choir	VPO	1990-05 & 12		
Strauss, R	Lieder Op. 10/1,3 and 8, Op. 15/1, Op. 17/2, Op. 21/1, Op. 27/2 and 4, Op. 36/3, Op. 43/2, Op. 69/5 and Av72	Kiri Te Kanawa, Georg Solti			1990-06		
Strauss, R	Vier letzte Lieder	Kiri Te Kanawa		VPO	1990-06		
Various	"Orchestra!" Music from the Channel 4 documentary series	Dudley Moore		Schleswig-Holstein Festival Orchestra	1990-06		Video
Shostakovich	Symphony No. 10			CSO	1990-10		Live
Debussy	Prélude à l'après-midi d'un faune			CSO	1990-10		Live
Mahler	Symphony No. 5			CSO	1990-11		Live
Bartók	Concerto for Orchestra			VPO	1990-11		Video. Live
Bartók	Piano Concerto No. 3	András Schiff		VPO	1990-11		Video. Live
Bartók	Dance Suite			VPO	1990-11		Video. Live
Bruckner	Symphony No. 8			CSO	1990-11		Live
Mozart	Mass in C minor K427	Elizabeth Norberg-Schulz, Anne Sofie von Otter, Uwe Heilmann, René Pape	Vienna State Opera Chorus	VPO	1990-12		
Haydn	Symphony No. 98			London Philharmonic Orchestra	1991-02		
Verdi	Otello	Luciano Pavarotti, Leo Nucci, Anthony Rolfe Johnson, Kiri Te Kanawa, Elzbieta Ardam	Metropolitan Opera Children's Chorus	CSO	1991-04		Live
Tippett	Byzantium	Faye Robinson		CSO	1991-04		Live
Shostakovich	Symphony No. 1			Royal Concertgebouw Orchestra	1991-09		Live
Stravinsky	The Rite of Spring			Royal Concertgebouw Orchestra	1991-09		Live
Debussy	La mer			CSO	1991-10		Live
Bruckner	Symphony No. 2			CSO	1991-10		
Verdi	Simon Boccanegra	Alexandru Agache, Kiri Te Kanawa, Michael Sylvester, Roberto Scandiuzzi, Alan Opie	ROHC	ROHO	1991-11		Video. Live
Mozart	Requiem	Arleen Auger, Cecilia Bartoli, Vinson Cole, René Pape	Vienna State Opera Chorus	VPO	1991-12		Live. Video
Haydn	Die Jahreszeiten	Ruth Ziesak, Uwe Heilmann, René Pape	CSC	CSO	1992-05		Live
Berlioz	Symphonie fantastique			CSO	1992-06		Live
Liszt	Les préludes			CSO	1992-06		Live
Strauss, R	Die Frau ohne Schatten	Thomas Moser, Cheryl Studer, Bryn Terfel, Robert Hale, Eva Marton	Salzburg Children's Choir, Vienna State Opera Chorus	VPO	1992-08	G,G,N	Video. Live
Bruckner	Symphony No. 3 In D Minor (1877)			CSO	1992-11		
Mahler	Das Lied von der Erde	Marjana Lipovšek, Thomas Moser (de)		Royal Concertgebouw Orchestra	1992-12		Live
Mendelssohn	Symphony No. 4			VPO	1993-02		Live
Shostakovich	Symphony No. 5			VPO	1993-02		Live
Verdi	Falstaff	José van Dam, Paolo Coni (it), Luca Canonici, Luciana Serra, Elizabeth Norberg-Schulz, Marjana Lipovšek	Berlin Radio Chorus	BPO	1993-03		Live
Haydn	Die Schöpfung	Ruth Ziesak, Herbert Lippert, René Pape, Anton Scharinger	CSC	CSO	1993-10 & 11		Live
Stravinsky	Symphony in Three Movements			CSO	1993-11		
Stravinsky	Petrushka			CSO	1993-11		Live
Stravinsky	A Card Game			CSO	1993-11		Live
Liszt	Mephisto Waltz No. 1			CSO	1993-11		
Liszt	Hungarian Rhapsody			CSO	1993-11		
Kodály	Háry János Suite			CSO	1993-11		
Weiner	Csongor És Tünde – Introduction and Scherzo			CSO	1993-11		
Bartók	Romanian Folk Dances			CSO	1993-11		
Bartók	Hungarian Sketches			CSO	1993-11		
Beethoven	Missa Solemnis	Júlia Várady, Iris Vermillion, Vinson Cole, René Pape	Berlin Radio Chorus	BPO	1994-03		Live
Mozart	Così fan tutte	Frank Lopardo, Olaf Bär, Michele Pertusi (it), Renée Fleming, Anne Sofie von Otter, Adelina Scarabelli	London Voices	Chamber Orchestra Of Europe	1994-05		Live
Wagner	Die Meistersinger Prelude to Act I			Solti Orchestral Project	1994-06		Live
Shostakovich	Symphony No. 9			Solti Orchestral Project	1994-06		Live
Smetana	The Bartered Bride Overture			Solti Orchestral Project	1994-06		Live
Brahms	Variations on a Theme of Haydn			Solti Orchestral Project	1994-06		Live
Strauss	Don Juan			Solti Orchestral Project	1994-06		Live
Beethoven	Immortal Beloved Soundtrack			LSO	1994		
Verdi	La traviata	Angela Gheorghiu, Frank Lopardo, Leo Nucci, Gillian Knight	ROHC	ROHO	1994-12		Video. Live
Bruckner	Symphony No. 1			CSO	1995-02		
Shostakovich	Symphony No. 13	Sergei Aleksashkin	CSC	CSO	1995-02		Live
Bartók	Romanian Folk Dances			VPO	1995-04		Video. Live
Kodály	Háry János Suite			VPO	1995-04		Video. Live
Weiner	Csongor És Tünde – Introduction and Scherzo			VPO	1995-04		Video. Live
Beethoven	Symphony No. 7			VPO	1995-04		Video. Live
Berlioz	La Damnation de Faust – Marche Hongroise			VPO	1995-04		Video. Live
Bartók	Concerto For Orchestra			World Orchestra for Peace	1995-07		Video. Live
Beethoven	Fidelio Finale			World Orchestra for Peace	1995-07		Video. Live
Rossini	Guillaume Tell Overture			World Orchestra for Peace	1995-07		Video. Live
Wagner	Die Meistersinger	José van Dam, René Pape, Ben Heppner, Herbert Lippert (de), Karita Mattila, Iris Vermillion	CSC	CSO	1995-09	G,N	Live
Bruckner	Symphony No. 0			CSO	1995-10		Live
Strauss, R	Till Eulenspiegel			BPO	1996-01		Live
Strauss, R	Also sprach Zarathustra			BPO	1996-01		Live
Strauss, R	Salome – Dance of the Seven Veils			BPO	1996-01		Live
Elgar	Enigma Variations			VPO	1996-04		Live
Kodály	Variations on a Hungarian Folksong, "The Peacock"			VPO	1996-04		Live
Blacher	Variations on a Theme of Paganini			VPO	1996-04		Live
Tchaikovsky	Symphony No. 6 – excerpts			St. Petersburg Philharmonic Orchestra	1996-04 & 05		Recorded for Anna Karenina film soundtrack
Tchaikovsky	Swan Lake – excerpts			St. Petersburg Philharmonic Orchestra	1996-04 & 05		Recorded for Anna Karenina film soundtrack
Tchaikovsky	Eugene Onegin – excerpts	Galina Gorchakova		St. Petersburg Philharmonic Orchestra	1996-04 & 05		Recorded for Anna Karenina film soundtrack
Tchaikovsky	Violin Concerto – excerpts	Maxim Vengerov		St. Petersburg Philharmonic Orchestra	1996-04 & 05		Recorded for Anna Karenina film soundtrack
Prokofiev	Alexander Nevsky		St. Petersburg Chamber Choir	St. Petersburg Philharmonic Orchestra	1996-04 & 05		Recorded for Anna Karenina film soundtrack|
Mozart	Don Giovanni	Michele Pertusi (it), Renée Fleming, Bryn Terfel, Mario Luperi, Herbert Lippert (de), Ann Murray, Monica Groop, Roberto Scaltriti	London Voices	LPO	1996-10	N	Live
Britten	Peter Grimes – Embroidery in Childhood	Renée Fleming, Jonathan Summers		LSO	1996-12		
Mozart	Le nozze di Figaro – Porgi amor and Dove sono	Renée Fleming		LSO	1996-12		
Strauss, R	Daphne – Ich komme	Renée Fleming		LSO	1996-12		
Tchaikovsky	Eugene Onegin – Letter Scene	Renée Fleming, Larissa Diadkova		LSO	1996-12		
Verdi	Otello – Era più calmo?	Renée Fleming, Larissa Diadkova		LSO	1996-12		
Verdi	La forza del destino – Pace, pace, mio dio	Angela Gheorghiu		LSO	1997-01		Unpublished
Verdi	Otello – Piangea cantando and Ave Maria	Angela Gheorghiu		LSO	1997-01		Unpublished
Verdi	Rigoletto – Caro nome	Angela Gheorghiu		LSO	1997-01		Unpublished
Verdi	Simon Boccanegra – come in quest'ora	Angela Gheorghiu		LSO	1997-01		Unpublished
Stravinsky	Symphony of Psalms		Glen Ellyn Children's Chorus	CSO	1997-03		
Stravinsky	Symphony in C			CSO	1997-03		
Mussorgsky	Khovanshchina Prelude			CSO	1997-03		
Mussorgsky	Songs and Dances of Death	Sergei Aleksashkin		CSO	1997-03		
Shostakovich	Symphony No. 15			CSO	1997-03		
Bartók	Cantata Profana	Tamás Daróczy (hu)	Hungarian Radio and Television Choruses	Budapest Festival Orchestra	1997-06	N,N	
Kodály	Psalmus Hungaricus	Tamás Daróczy (hu)	Hungarian Radio and Television Choruses	Budapest Festival Orchestra	1997-06		
Weiner	Serenade Op. 3	Alexandru Agache	Schola Cantorum Budapestiensis	Budapest Festival Orchestra	1997-06		
Mahler	Symphony No. 5			Tonhalle Orchester Zürich	1997-07		Live. Solti's last recording
