= Marga Schiml discography =

Mezzo-soprano Marga Schiml participated in several recordings in concert and opera.

Recordings with Marga Schiml
Composer	Work	Role	Conductor Choir Orchestra	Soloists	Date	Reissue	OCLC
Bach	Christmas Oratorio Parts I–III		Helmuth Rilling Gächinger Kantorei Bach-Collegium Stuttgart	Martina von Bargen-Meister; Alison Browner; Adalbert Kraus; Wolfgang Schöne	1984		
Beethoven	Symphony No. 9		Herbert Blomstedt: Dresden State Opera Chorus; MDR Rundfunkchor; Staatskapelle Dresden	Helena Döse; Peter Schreier; Theo Adam	1980	2009	704904121
Bruckner	Mass No. 1		Eugen Jochum Chor und BRSO	Edith Mathis; Wieslaw Ochman; Karl Ridderbusch; Elmar Schloter	1972	1995	34354010
Debussy	Pelléas et Mélisande	Geneviève	Rafael Kubelik Chor und BRSO	Nicolai Gedda; Helen Donath; Dietrich Fischer-Dieskau; Peter Meven	1971	1994	38078400
Cornelius	Der Barbier von Bagdad	Bostana	Ferdinand Leitner WDR Chor WDR Sinfonieorchester	Helen Donath; Dale Duesing; Rolf Dieter Krull; Horst Laubenthal; Anton Maxen; Fritz Peter; Andre Peysang; Ferdinand Schnelle	1974	2009	611585065
Dvořák	Stabat Mater		Jiří Bělohlávek: Prague Philharmonic Chorus; Bambini Di Praga; Czech Philharmonic	Livia Aghova; Aldo Baldin; Ludek Vele	1991	2007	259591710
Gluck	Le cinesi	Tangia	Lamberto Gardelli BRSO	Kaaren Erickson; Alexandrina Milcheva; Thomas Moser	1983		21492349
Handel	Solomon		Heinz Rögner Radio-Chor und Radio-Symphonie-Orchester Berlin	Eva-Maria Bundschuh; Eberhard Buchner; Hermann Christian Polster; Sibylle Suske; Helga Termer; Joachim Vogt; Regina Werner	1986	2008	704903117
Kiel	Der Stern von Bethlehem		Roland Bader Choir of St. Hedwig's Cathedral Radio-Symphonie-Orchester Berlin	Horst Laubenthal	1991		35728190
Mozart	La clemenza di Tito	Annio	Karl Böhm Rundfunkchor Leipzig Staatskapelle Dresden	Peter Schreier; Julia Varady; Teresa Berganza; Edith Mathis; Theo Adam	1979	1993	28134680
Mozart	Mass in C major, K. 258 "Piccolomini"; Mass in C major, K. 262 "Missa longa"		Herbert Kegel Rundfunkchor Leipzig Dresdner Philharmonie	Hermann-Christian Polster; Mitsuko Shirai; Armin Ude	1984		780944973
Nicolai	Te Deum		Gerd Albrecht RIAS Kammerchor Radio-Symphonie-Orchester Berlin	Victor von Halem; Rüdiger Wohlers	1981	1991	785977071
Puccini	Suor Angelica	La Badessa	Giuseppe Patanè: Chor des Bayerischen Rundfunks; Munich Boys Choir; BRSO	Lucia Popp; Marjana Lipovšek; Birgit Calm; Maria Gabriella Ferroni; Diane Jennings	1988		19949311
Righini	Cantata on the Death of King Frederick II		Gerd Albrecht RIAS Kammerchor Radio-Symphonie-Orchester Berlin	Victor von Halem; Georgine Resick; Rüdiger Wohlers	1983		13761931
Schnebel	Dahlemer Messe		Zoltán Peskó: RIAS Kammerchor; Südfunk-Chor; SWF-Sinfonieorchester Baden-Baden	Bernhard Gärtner; Zigmond Szatmary; Christine Whittlesey; Kurt Widmer	1993		312047962
Schubert	Part songs			Helen Donath; Peter Schreier; Hermann Prey; Robert Holl; Leonard Hokanson (piano)	1978		9172375
Schumann	Das Paradies und die Peri		Wolf-Dieter Hauschild Rundfunkchor Leipzig MDR Sinfonieorchester	Eberhard Buchner; Magdalena Hajossyova; Klaus König; Rosemarie Lang; Siegfried Lorenz; Carola Nossek; Hermann Christian Polster; Christian Vogel	1997	2009	611332116
Strauss	Salome	Page	Ferdinand Leitner Bavarian State Orchestra	Leonie Rysanek; Dietrich Fischer-Dieskau; Wieslaw Ochmann; Gerhard Stolze; Astrid Varnay	1971	1991	39326556
Wagner	Der fliegende Holländer	Mary	Pinchas Steinberg Budapest Radio Chorus Austrian Radio Symphony Orchestra	Peter Seiffert; Ingrid Haubold; Jörg Hering; Erich Knodt; Alfred Muff	1993		232300625
Wagner	Götterdämmerung	Floßhilde	Pierre Boulez Chorus and Orchestra of the Bayreuth Festival	Gwyneth Jones; Manfred Jung; Franz Mazura; Jeannine Altmeyer; Hermann Becht; Fritz Hübner	1981	2005	29274235
Wagner	Die Meistersinger von Nürnberg (video)	Magdalene	Horst Stein Chorus and Orchestra of the Bayreuth Festival	Graham Clark; MariAnne Häggander; Siegfried Jerusalem; Hermann Prey; Manfred Schenk; Bernd Weikl	1984	2006	70284825
Wagner	Parsifal	Flowermaiden	Georg Solti: Vienna State Opera Chorus; Vienna Boys' Choir; Vienna Philharmonic	René Kollo; Christa Ludwig; Dietrich Fischer-Dieskau; Gottlob Frick; Hans Hotter; Zoltán Kelemen	1973	1986	658253379
Wagner	Parsifal (video)	Flowermaiden	Horst Stein Chorus and Orchestra of the Bayreuth Festival	Siegfried Jerusalem; Eva Randová; Leif Roar; Matti Salminen; Hans Sotin; Bernd Weikl	1981		176903714
Wagner	Das Rheingold (video)	Flosshilde	Pierre Boulez Chorus and Orchestra of the Bayreuth Festival	Hermann Becht; Fritz Hübner; Siegfried Jerusalem; Donald McIntyre; Matti Salminen; Heinz Zednik	1980	2005	62096436
Wagner	Die Walküre	Siegrune	Pierre Boulez Chorus and Orchestra of the Bayreuth Festival	Jeannine Altmeyer; Peter Hofmann; Gwyneth Jones; Donald McIntyre; Matti Salminen; Hanna Schwarz	1981	1988	47765444
Weber	Mass No. 1		Horst Stein Bamberg Symphony Chorus Bamberger Symphoniker	Krisztina Laki; Josef Protschka; Jan-Hendrick Rootering			885066702
Weber	Oberon		Rafael Kubelik Chor und BRSO	Arleen Augér; Plácido Domingo; Franz Gerstacker; Donald Grobe; Julia Hamari; Theodor Hell; Birgit Nilsson; Hermann Prey	1971	2005	836314684
