= Rebeka Bobanj =

Hungarian dramatic coloratura soprano (born 1981)

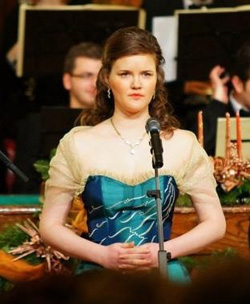
- Bobanj in 2011

Background information
- Born: June 5, 1981 (age 45); Subotica, Yugoslavia
- Origin: Hungarian
- Genre: opera
- Instrument: Vocals (Dramatic coloratura soprano)
- Website: bobanjrebeka.com

Rebeka Bobanj (born June 5, 1981 in Subotica) is a Hungarian dramatic coloratura soprano.

== Early life ==
Rebeka Bobanj was born in 1981, in Subotica. From 1987 to 2001, she studied piano and singing in the Music School in Subotica under Emília Baráth and Éva Heródek. In 2000, she received her secondary school certificate in the Medical School in Subotica. She received her opera singer and teaching degrees between 2006 and 2011 at the Faculty of Music, University of Szeged as the student of Mária Temesi.

As a student, Rebeka won the third prize at the International Simándy Singing Competition, as well as several special prizes. These include, among others, the special prize of the Parsifal Foundation, Palace of Arts, Foundation for Szeged, Csokonai Theatre in Debrecen, and the special prizes of Mária Gregorné dr.Takács and Zsolt Hollósi. Her stagecraft teacher was Attila Toronykői, and her opera repertoire teacher, Pál Tamás. Rebeka also participated in the masterclasses of Ionel Pantera and Krisztina Laki.

In 2008, she was awarded the Scholarship of the Republic from the Ministry of Education and Culture, signed by Dr. István Hiller. During 2009 and 2011, the József Sófi Foundation awarded her the special commendation of the Board of Trustees, then a special prize, and the first prize in 2011, which is one of Hungary's most prestigious awards among university students. In 2011, Rebeka Bobanj's application was one of the best among the 200 incoming applications of the most outstanding students. She performed on several occasions at the Miskolc International Opera Festival and the Cluj Opera Festival.

Between 2009 and 2011, the Philharmonia Budapest Concert Agency invited her to sing the role of Rosina in Rossini's Il barbiere di Siviglia in many parts of Hungary, and the role of the Queen of the Night in Mozart's Die Zauberflöte. In 2011, she received an invitation from the Hungarian State Opera to sing the role of Musette in Puccini's La Bohéme.

== Roles ==
- R.Korsakov: Sadko - Volhova
- Mozart: Loca del Cairo - Celidora
- Mozart: Die Zauberflöte - Königin der Nacht
- Ravel: L'enfant et les Sortiléges - La Princessa
- Rossini: Il barbiere di Siviglia - Rosina
- Puccini: La bohéme - Mimi
- Puccini: La bohéme - Musette

== Awards and commendations ==
- 2012 - Award of the Solti Foundation /Belgium/
- 2011 - first prize of the József Sófi Foundation
- 2011 - special prizes of the International Simándy Singing Competition (prize of the Csokonai Theatre in Debrecen, special prize of the Foundation for Szeged, special prizes of Mária Gregorné Dr. Takács and Zsolt Hollósi)
- 2010 - special prize of the József Sófi Foundation
- 2009 - special commendation of the József Sófi Foundation's Board of Trustees
- 2008 - Scholarship of the Republic
- 2008 - third prize and special prizes at the International Simándy Singing Competition (special prizes of the Palace of Arts and the Parsifal Foundation)
- 2006 - Ministry Scholarship
- 1999 - first prize at the Singing Competition of Music Schools in Serbia

== Recordings ==
- Puccini: La bohème "Sì, mi chiamano, Mimi" Mimi
- Verdi: Ernani "Surta è la notte" Elvira
- Rossini: Il barbiere di Siviglia "Una voce poco fa" Rosina
- Puccini: La bohème "Quando m'en vo" Musette
- Rossini: Il barbiere di Siviglia "Dunque io son" Rosina, Figaro
- Josip Hatze: Serenada
- Liszt: Oh, quand je dors
- Puccini: La rondine "Chi il bel sogno di Doretta" Magda

== Sources ==
- Simándy Singing Competition report
- Interview on the Simándy Singing Competition
- Hungary's most prestigious scholarship
- 2010 - Special prize of the Sófi Foundation
- Szeged Chamber Theatre - R. Korsakov: Sadko / Volhova /
- Opera Viva in Cluj - Mozart: Loca del Cairo / Celidora /
- 2010. Miskolc Opera Festival - Ravel: The child and spells / Princess /
- Invitation of Philharmonia Budapest - Rossini: Il barbiere di Siviglia / Rosina /
