= Klaus Mäkelä =

Finnish conductor and cellist

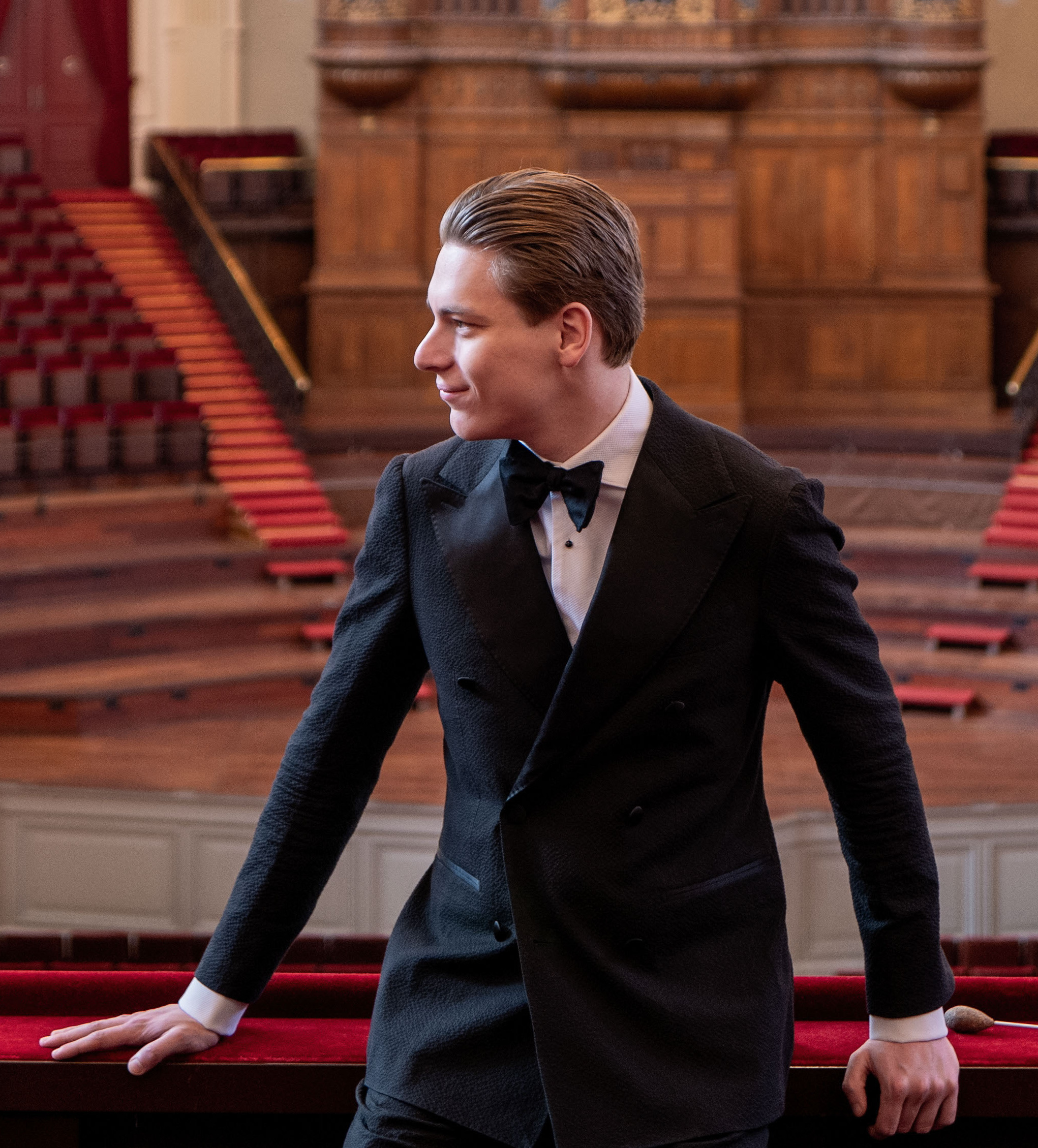
- Klaus Mäkelä at the Concertgebouw in Amsterdam (2022)
- Born: 17 January 1996 (age 30); Helsinki, Finland
- Education: Sibelius Academy
- Occupations: conductor; cellist
- Organizations: Oslo Philharmonic; Orchestre de Paris; Royal Concertgebouw Orchestra; Chicago Symphony Orchestra
- Parents: Sami Mäkelä (father); Taru Myöhänen-Mäkelä (mother)
- Family: Tapio Myöhänen (grandfather); Ellen Mäkelä (younger sister)
- Website: klausmakela.com

Klaus Mäkelä (Finnish: [ˈklɑu̯s ˈmækelæ]; born 17 January 1996) is a Finnish conductor and cellist. He is music director of the Orchestre de Paris, chief conductor-designate of the Royal Concertgebouw Orchestra, and music director-designate of the Chicago Symphony Orchestra.

== Biography ==
Mäkelä was born in Helsinki into a family of musicians; his father is the cellist Sami Mäkelä, and his mother is the pianist Taru Myöhänen-Mäkelä. His grandfather, Tapio Myöhänen, is a violinist and violist. His younger sister, Ellen Mäkelä, is a dancer with the Ballets de Catalunya.

Mäkelä studied conducting at the Sibelius Academy with Jorma Panula and cello with Marko Ylönen, Timo Hanhinen and Hannu Kiiski. He became interested in conducting at age 12, when he sang in the choir of the Finnish National Opera. Mäkelä has been a soloist with Finnish orchestras such as the Lahti Symphony Orchestra, the Kuopio Symphony Orchestra and the Jyväskylä Sinfonia. He has performed at Finnish music festivals such as the Kuhmo Chamber Music Festival and the Naantali Music Festival.

In September 2017, Mäkelä first guest-conducted the Swedish Radio Symphony Orchestra. On the basis of this appearance, in December 2017, the orchestra announced the appointment of Mäkelä as its next principal guest conductor, effective with the 2018–2019 season, with a contract of three years. Mäkelä was the youngest-ever appointment to a titled conductor post with the orchestra.

Mäkelä was the artistic director of the Turku Music Festival from 2018 to 2024. In May 2018, Mäkelä first guest-conducted the Oslo Philharmonic. On the basis of this appearance, in October 2018, the orchestra announced the appointment of Mäkelä as its next chief conductor, effective with the 2020–2021 season, with an initial contract of 3 seasons. This appointment marked the first chief conductorship for Mäkelä. In May 2020, the orchestra announced an extension of Mäkelä's initial contract with the Oslo Philharmonic for an additional four seasons, unusual in its timing before the official start of his tenure with the orchestra. He had been scheduled to conclude his Oslo Philharmonic tenure at the close of the 2026–2027 season. In August 2025, the Oslo Philharmonic announced that Mäkelä is to conclude his tenure with the orchestra at the close of the 2025–2026 season, one season earlier than previously announced.

In June 2019, Mäkelä first guest-conducted the Orchestre de Paris. In June 2020, the Orchestre de Paris announced the appointment of Mäkelä as its next music director, effective with the 2022–2023 season, with an initial contract of five seasons. The original intention had been for Mäkelä to hold the post of musical advisor for the two prior seasons, from 2020 to 2022. However, Mäkelä assumed the role of music director in September 2021, one year earlier than originally planned. He is scheduled to stand down from the Orchestre de Paris at the close of the 2026–2027 season.

In September 2020, Mäkelä first guest-conducted the Royal Concertgebouw Orchestra. Following several additional guest-conducting appearances, in June 2022, the RCO announced the appointment of Mäkelä as an artistic partner for the period of 2022–2027, and subsequently as its next chief conductor, effective with the 2027–2028 season, with an initial contract of five years. Mäkelä's collaboration with the RCO includes appearances in the Mahler Festival in May 2025, in which he conducted Mahler's Symphony No.1 and Symphony No. 8, "Symphony of a Thousand".

In 2022, Mäkelä first guest-conducted the Chicago Symphony Orchestra (CSO), and returned for a guest-conducting appearance in February 2023. In April 2024, the CSO announced the appointment of Mäkelä as its next music director, effective with the 2027–2028 season, with an initial contract of five years.

Mäkelä has an exclusive recording contract with Decca, only the third conductor in Decca's history with an exclusive recording contract. His first recording for Decca was a set of the complete Sibelius symphonies with the Oslo Philharmonic Orchestra, which was followed by recordings of Sibelius and Prokofiev violin concertos with Janine Jansen and Shostakovich Symphonies Nos. 4, 5 and 6. He has also recorded three recordings with the Orchestre de Paris, with music of Berioz, Stravinsky and of Debussy. In June 2024, Mäkelä was named "Conductor of the Year" at the 2024 OPUS Klassik Awards for his 2023 recording with the Orchestre de Paris of Stravinsky's The Rite of Spring and The Firebird. In recognition of his artistic achievements, he has also been awarded the Sibelius Medal (2022) and named a Chevalier de l’Ordre des Arts et des Lettres (2025).

== Discography ==
- Sibelius: Complete Symphonies (Symphonies 1–7); Tapiola; '3 Late Fragments' (with the Oslo Philharmonic) (2022, Decca Classics) OCLC 1324242842
- Stravinsky: The Rite of Spring, The Firebird (with the Orchestre de Paris) (2023, Decca Classics) OCLC 1461920006
- Stravinsky: Petrushka; Debussy: Jeux, Prélude à l'après-midi d'un faune (with the Orchestre de Paris) (2024, Decca Classics) OCLC 1440220403
- Sibelius, Prokofiev: Violin Concertos, with Janine Jansen and the Oslo Philharmonic (2024, Decca Classics) OCLC 1456370355
- Shostakovich: Symphonies 4, 5 & 6 (with the Oslo Philharmonic) (2024, Decca Classics) OCLC 1499431258
- Berlioz: Symphonie fantastique; Ravel: La valse (with the Orchestre de Paris) (2025, Decca Classics) OCLC 1533589127
