= Anima (chorus) =

American vocal ensemble based in Illinois

Anima, formerly the Glen Ellyn Children's Chorus (GECC) is a multiple Grammy Award-winning chorus based in the Glen Ellyn suburb of Chicago.

== History ==
The chorus was founded in 1964 as the Glen Ellyn Children's Theater Chorus by Barbara Born. Dr. Doreen Rao served as Director from 1972 to 1988, with the chorus receiving four of its many Grammy Awards and a Grand Prix du Disque during her tenure. Emily Ellsworth served as artistic director from 1996 to 2018, changing the name of the chorus to Anima in May 2008. Dr. Charles Sundquist served as artistic director from 2018 to 2022. William Buhr has served as Principal Accompanist since 1984. Evan Bruno began serving as artistic director in 2022.

The chorus has performed frequently with the Chicago Symphony Orchestra at Chicago's Symphony Center, the Ravinia Festival, the Music of the Baroque, the Grant Park Music Festival and New York's Carnegie Hall. It has participated in four Grammy Award-winning recordings with the CSO and performed under renowned conductors including Sir Georg Solti, Christoph Eschenbach, Claudio Abbado, James Levine and James Conlon. Recently a small number of singers participated in the Lyric Opera. It has toured throughout the United States as well as internationally to Canada, Europe, Australia, Brazil, China, South Africa, England, Spain, Morocco, Greece, and England.

Ensembles included in the Anima-GECC curriculum include KidSingers, Treble and Treble Plus Chorus, Concert Chorus, and Touring Chorus. All choruses are currently conducted by Evan Bruno.
