= Alexandru Agache =

Romanian operatic baritone

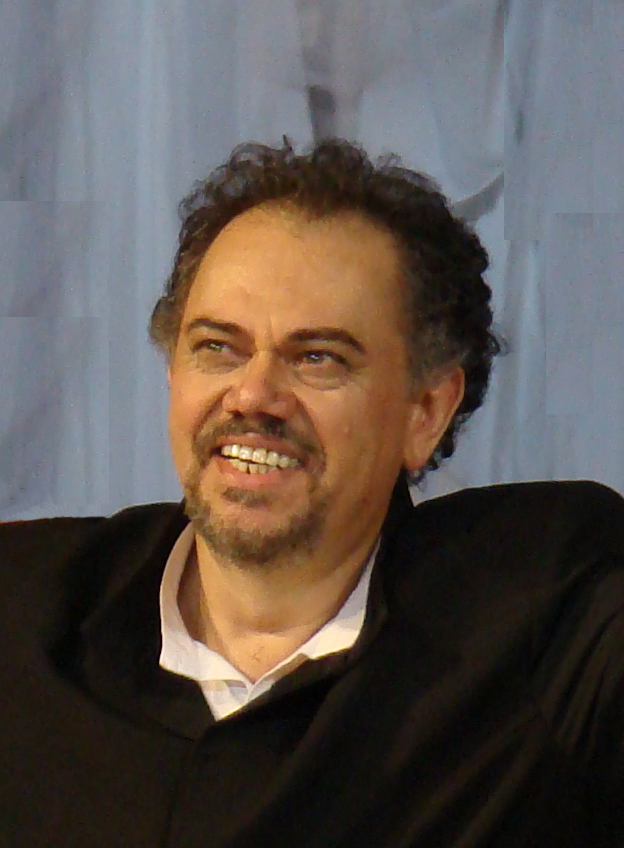
Image of Alexandru Agache

Alexandru Agache (born 16 August 1955) is a Romanian-Hungarian operatic baritone who has had an active international career since 1979. Possessing a powerful and flexible voice, he has drawn particular acclaim in the operas of Giuseppe Verdi.

== Career ==
Born in Cluj, Agache was trained at the Cluj Conservatory. He made his professional opera debut in 1979 at the Cluj-Napoca Romanian National Opera as Silvano in Giuseppe Verdi's Un ballo in maschera. He was active at that house throughout the 1980s, singing roles like the Count di Luna in Verdi's Il trovatore, Germont in Verdi's La traviata, Iago in Verdi's Otello, Malatesta in Gaetano Donizetti's Don Pasquale, Posa in Verdi's Don Carlos, Sharpless in Giacomo Puccini's Madama Butterfly, Schaunard in Puccini's La bohème, and the title roles in Wolfgang Amadeus Mozart's Don Giovanni and Verdi's Nabucco.

In 1987, Agache toured to Tokyo, Japan with the Berlin State Opera where he performed the role of Count Almaviva in Mozart's The Marriage of Figaro. In 1988, he made his debut at the Royal Opera House in London as Renato in Un ballo in maschera. He has since returned there as Amonasro in Verdi's Aida, Enrico Ashton in Donizetti's Lucia di Lammermoor, the Miller in Verdi's Luisa Miller, and in the title roles of Verdi's Rigoletto and Verdi's Simon Boccanegra. In 1989, he made his debut at La Scala in Milan as Belcore in Donizetti's L'elisir d'amore. In 1992, he made his United States debut at the Houston Grand Opera as the Count di Luna. In 1999, he made his debut at the Metropolitan Opera as Simon Boccanegra with Karita Mattila as Amelia, Plácido Domingo as Adorno, and James Levine conducting. In 2000, he made his debut at the Arena di Verona Festival as Don Alvaro in Verdi's La forza del destino. He has also sung leading roles as a guest artist at the Ankara Opera House, the Bavarian State Opera, the Grand Théâtre de Genève, the Hamburg State Opera, the Hungarian State Opera House, the Lyric Opera of Chicago, the Paris Opera, the Semperoper, the Teatro Colón, and the Vienna State Opera among others.
