= Chicago Symphony Orchestra =

Orchestra based in Chicago, Illinois

- Orchestra
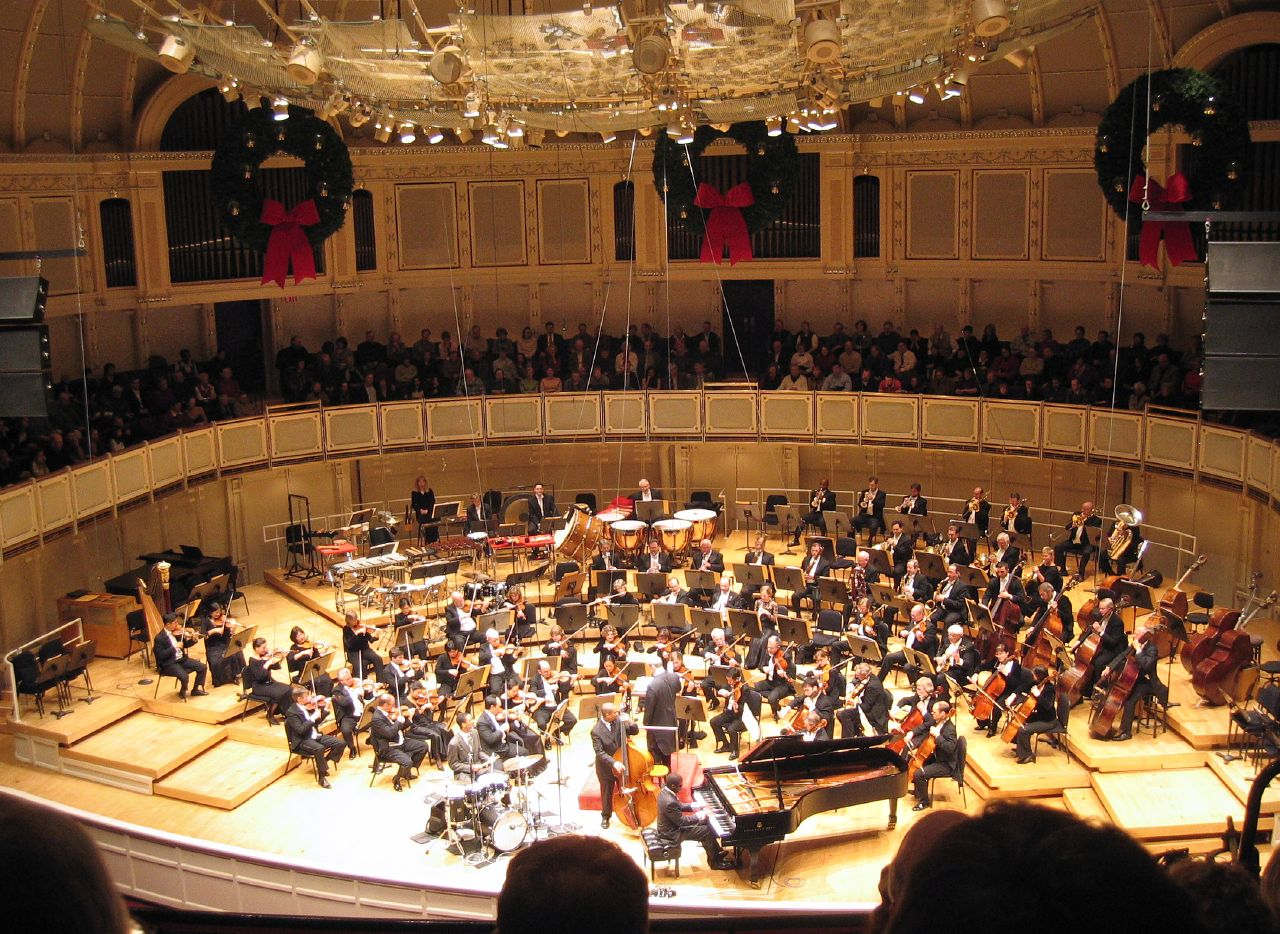
- The Orchestra performs in Orchestra Hall at the Chicago Symphony Center
- Founded: 1891; 135 years ago
- Location: Chicago, Illinois, US
- Concert hall: Symphony Center
- Music director: Klaus Mäkelä (designate, effective 2027)
- Website: cso.org
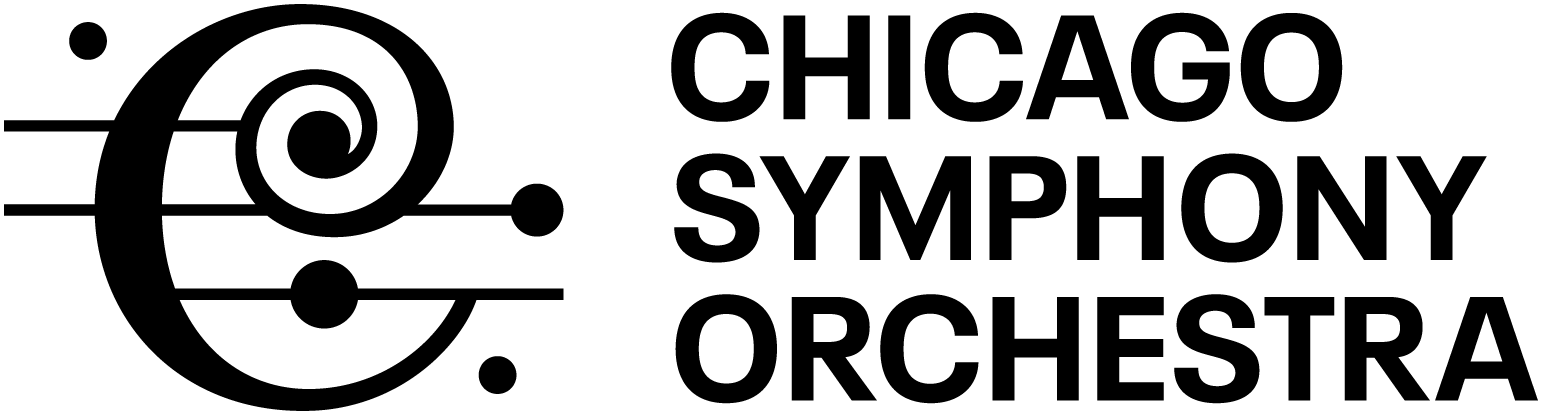

The Chicago Symphony Orchestra (CSO) is an American symphony orchestra based in the Loop community area of Chicago, Illinois, United States. Founded by Theodore Thomas in 1891, the ensemble has been based in the Symphony Center since 1904 and plays a summer season at the Ravinia Festival. It is one of the American orchestras commonly referred to as the "Big Five".

The orchestra's most recent music director is Riccardo Muti, whose tenure spanned the seasons from 2010 to 2023, and he continues to perform on occasion as director-emeritus. In 2024, Klaus Mäkelä was named music director-designate, with his first contractual season to begin in 2027.

== History ==
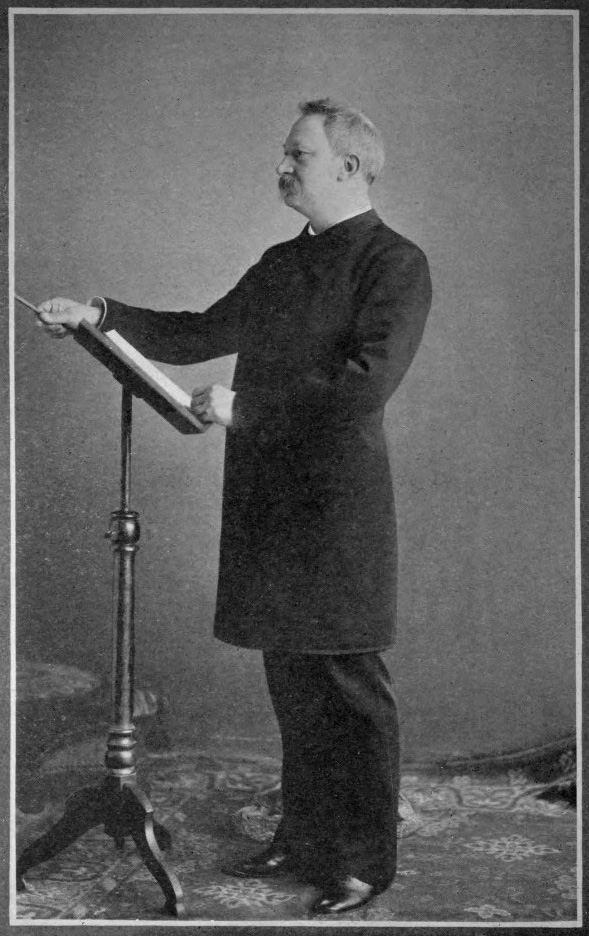
Theodore Thomas, founding father and first conductor of the orchestra

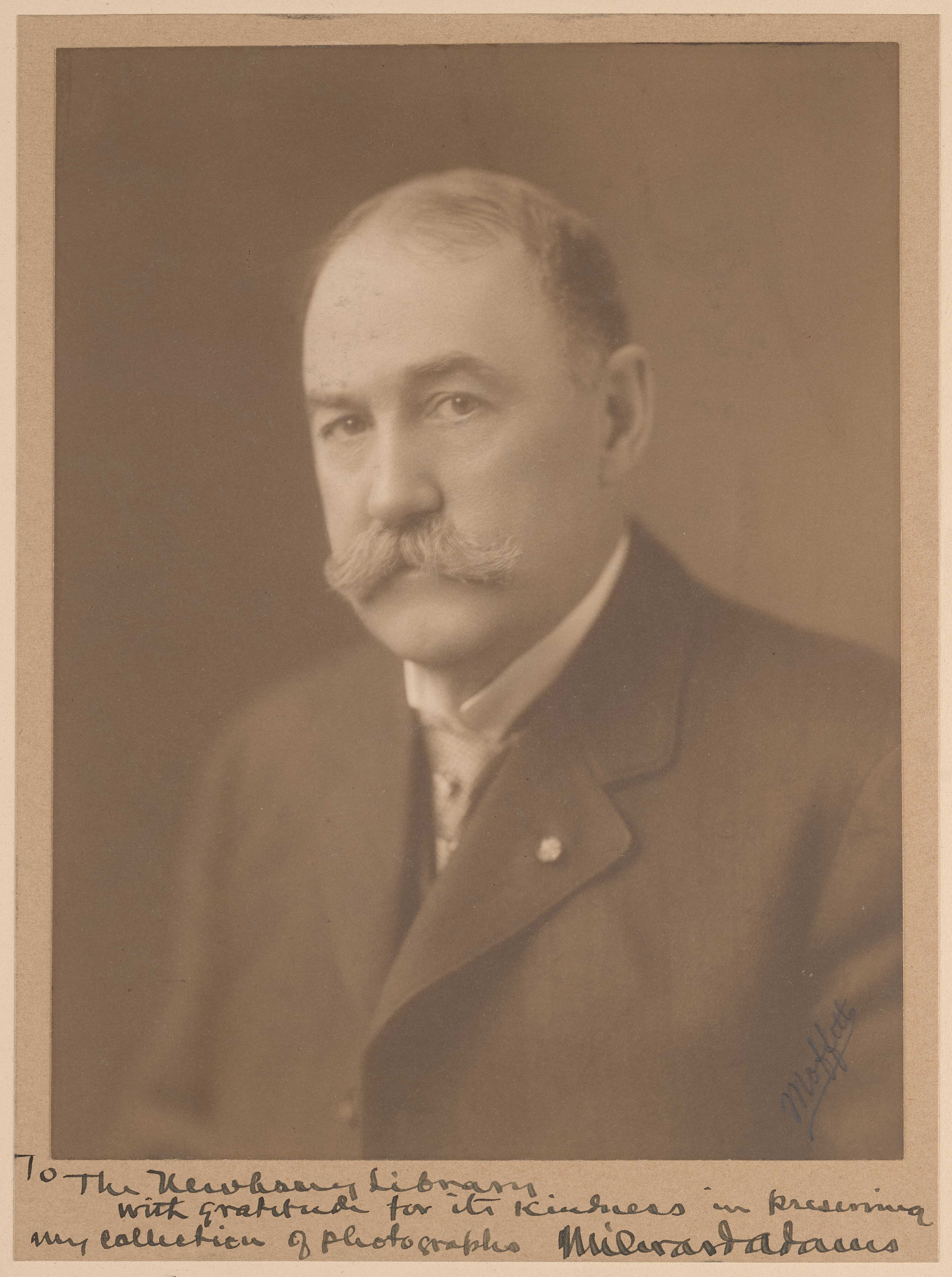
Milward Adams, first manager of the orchestra

In 1890, Charles Norman Fay, a Chicago businessman, invited Theodore Thomas to establish an orchestra in Chicago. Under the name "Chicago Orchestra", the orchestra played its first concert October 16, 1891, at the Auditorium Theater. It is one of the oldest orchestras in the United States, along with the New York Philharmonic, the Boston Symphony Orchestra and the Saint Louis Symphony Orchestra.

Orchestra Hall, now a component of the Symphony Center complex, was designed by Chicago architect Daniel H. Burnham and completed in 1904. Thomas served as music director for thirteen years until his death shortly after Orchestra Hall was dedicated on December 14, 1904. The orchestra was renamed "Theodore Thomas Orchestra" in 1905, and today, Orchestra Hall still has "Theodore Thomas Orchestra Hall" inscribed on its façade.

In 1905, Frederick Stock became music director, a post he held until his death in 1942. The orchestra was renamed the Chicago Symphony Orchestra in 1913.

Subsequent music directors have included Désiré Defauw, Artur Rodziński, Rafael Kubelík, Fritz Reiner, Jean Martinon, Georg Solti, and Daniel Barenboim. Reiner's work with the orchestra included a series of television appearances, the first in its history. He also planned but was unable to bring to fruition its first tour outside the United States. Later, Solti thought it was essential to raise the orchestra's international profile. Solti led the Chicago Symphony in a European tour in 1971, playing in ten countries. It was the first time in its 80-year history that the orchestra had played outside of North America. The orchestra received plaudits from European critics, (Note: After the orchestra played at the Edinburgh Festival the critic William Mann wrote: "I am tempted to describe it as the United States' most completely accomplished orchestra. It has the fine attack of the New York Phil under Bernstein, the radiance of the Boston under Leinsdorf, the classic elegance of the Cleveland under Szell, and to these qualities it adds, under Solti, a warm, human musical expressiveness that one associates with European rather than modern American orchestras." After one of the London concerts, Alan Blyth wrote, "nobody could doubt that this is about the most formidably-equipped orchestra in the world at present".) and was welcomed home at the end of the tour with a ticker-tape parade.

On May 5, 2008, the CSO announced the appointment of Riccardo Muti as its 10th music director, starting with the 2010–2011 season After extending his stay several times, the CSO confirmed that Muti would conclude his active directorship of the orchestra at end of the 2022–2023 season. In September 2023, the orchestra granted Muti the title of music director emeritus for life.

In 2022, Klaus Mäkelä first guest-conducted the CSO, and returned for a guest-conducting appearance in February 2023. In April 2024, the CSO announced the appointment of Mäkelä as its next music director, effective with the 2027–2028 season, with an initial contract of five years.

The orchestra has also hosted many distinguished guest conductors, including Thomas Beecham, Leonard Bernstein, Aaron Copland, Edward Elgar, Morton Gould, Paul Hindemith, Erich Kunzel, Erich Leinsdorf, Charles Munch, Eugene Ormandy, André Previn, Sergei Prokofiev, Sergei Rachmaninoff, Maurice Ravel, Arnold Schoenberg, Leonard Slatkin, Leopold Stokowski, James Levine, Richard Strauss, George Szell, Klaus Tennstedt, Michael Tilson Thomas, Bruno Walter, and John Williams. Many of these guests have also recorded with the orchestra. Carlos Kleiber made his only symphonic guest appearances in America with the CSO in October 1978 and June 1983.

The three principal guest conductors of the orchestra have been Carlo Maria Giulini, Claudio Abbado, and Pierre Boulez.

The CSO holds an annual fundraiser, originally known as the Chicago Symphony Marathon, more recently as "Radiothon" and "Symphonython", in conjunction with Chicago radio station WFMT. As part of the event, from 1986 through 2008, the orchestra released tracks from their broadcast archives on double LP/CD collections, as well as two larger sets of broadcasts and rarities (CSO: The First 100 Years, 12 CDs, 1991; CSO in the 20th Century: Collector's Choice, 10 CDs, 2000).

== Ravinia Festival ==
The Chicago Symphony Orchestra maintains a summer home at the Ravinia Festival in Ravinia Park, Highland Park, Illinois. The CSO first performed there on November 20, 1905, during Ravinia Park's second year since its opening in 1904, and continued to appear there on and off through August 1931, after which Ravinia Park closed for four years due to the Great Depression. The year of Ravinia Park's re-opening, the CSO helped to inaugurate the first season of the Ravinia Festival on July 3, 1936, and has been in residence at the festival every summer since. The one exception to this is during the COVID-19 pandemic, when the orchestra did not perform any concerts due to Ravinia announcing that it had cancelled all concerts for the 2020 season.

Many conductors have made their debut with the Chicago Symphony Orchestra at Ravinia, and several have gone on to become music director for the festival, including Seiji Ozawa (1964–68), James Levine (1973–93), and Christoph Eschenbach (1995–2003). James Conlon held the title from 2005 until 2015. The Ravinia Festival created an honorific title for James Levine, "Conductor Laureate", and signed him to a five-year renewable contract beginning in 2018. On December 4, 2017, after Levine was accused of sexual misconduct, the Ravinia Festival severed all ties with Levine, and terminated his five-year contract to lead the Chicago Symphony there. Marin Alsop served as the festival's first artistic curator from 2018 until 2019. She became its chief conductor and curator in 2021, stepping down in 2026.

== Recordings ==
The Chicago Symphony Orchestra has amassed an extensive discography. Recordings by the Chicago Symphony Orchestra and the Chicago Symphony Chorus have earned sixty-five Grammy Awards from the Recording Academy. These include several Classical Album of the Year awards, awards in Best Classical Performance in vocal soloist, choral, instrumental, engineering and orchestral categories.

On May 1, 1916, Frederick Stock and the orchestra recorded the Wedding March from Felix Mendelssohn's music to A Midsummer Night's Dream for Columbia Records. Stock and the CSO made numerous recordings for Columbia and the Victor Talking Machine Company/RCA Victor. The Chicago Symphony's first electrical recordings were made for Victor in December 1925, including a performance of Karl Goldmark's In Springtime overture. These early electrical recordings were made in Victor's Chicago studios; within a couple of years Victor began recording the CSO in Orchestra Hall. Stock continued recording for Columbia and RCA Victor until his death in 1942.

In 1951, Rafael Kubelík made the first modern high fidelity recordings with the orchestra, in Orchestra Hall, for Mercury. Like the first electrical recordings, these performances were made with a single microphone. Philips has reissued these performances on compact disc with the original Mercury label and liner notes.

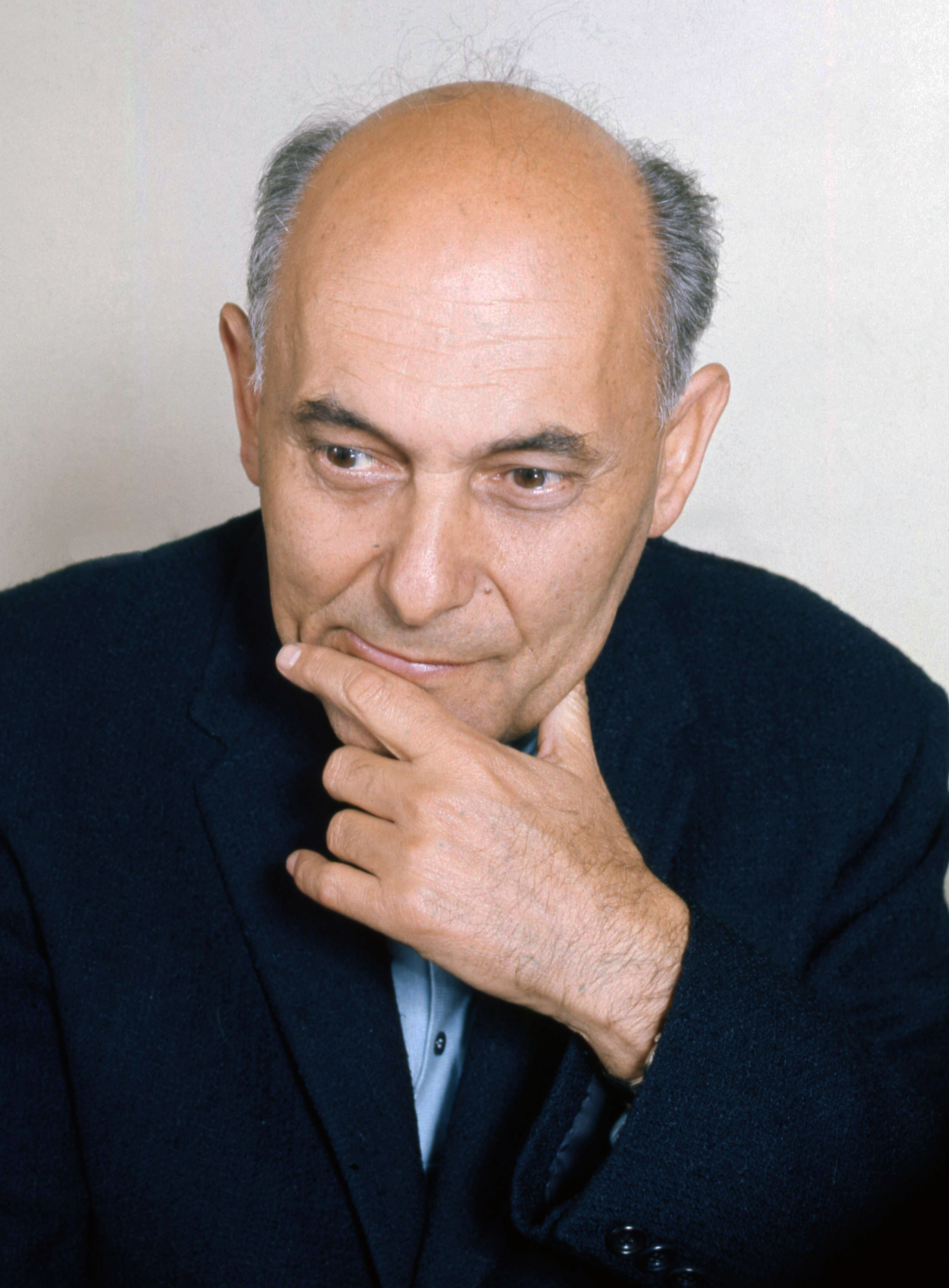
Sir Georg Solti

In March 1954, Fritz Reiner made the first stereophonic recordings with the CSO, again in Orchestra Hall, for RCA Victor, including performances of two symphonic poems by Richard Strauss: Ein Heldenleben and Also sprach Zarathustra. Reiner and the orchestra continued to record for RCA Victor through 1963. These were mostly recorded in RCA Victor's triple-channel "Living Stereo" process. RCA has digitally remastered the recordings and released them on CD and SACD. Jean Martinon also recorded with the CSO for RCA Victor during the 1960s, producing performances that have been reissued on CD.

Sir Georg Solti recorded with the CSO primarily for Decca Records. These Solti recordings were issued in the U.S. on the London label and include a highly acclaimed Mahler series, recorded, in part, in the historic Medinah Temple—some installments were recorded in the Krannert Center for the Performing Arts at the University of Illinois (in Urbana), as well as in the Sofiensaal in Vienna, Austria. Many of the recordings with Daniel Barenboim were released on Teldec.

In 2007, the Chicago Symphony formed its own recording label, CSO Resound. After an agreement was reached with the orchestra's musicians, arrangements were made for new recordings to be released digitally at online outlets and on compact disc. The first CSO Resound CD, a recording of Haitink's rendition of Mahler's Third Symphony, was released in the spring of 2007. Releases that followed included Bruckner's Seventh Symphony, Mahler's Sixth Symphony, and Shostakovich's Fourth Symphony (Grammy winner), all conducted by Haitink; Shostakovich's Fifth Symphony led by Myung-Whun Chung; "Traditions and Transformations: Sounds of Silk Road Chicago" with the orchestra's Judson and Joyce Green Creative Consultant Yo-Yo Ma (Grammy winner); and recordings of Verdi's Requiem (Grammy winner) and Otello, under the direction of Muti.

The Chicago Symphony Orchestra and Chorus have recorded the music for two movies: Fantasia 2000 conducted by James Levine and Lincoln conducted by John Williams. Selections from the orchestra and chorus's recording of Johann Sebastian Bach's St Matthew Passion, conducted by Sir Georg Solti, were used in the movie Casino.

== Broadcasts ==
The Chicago Symphony first broadcast on the radio in 1925. Though often sporadic, there have been broadcasts ever since. With the 1965–1966 season, Chicago radio station WFMT began regular tape-delayed stereo broadcasts of CSO concerts, running through the 1968–1969 season. They resumed from 1976 through the 2000–2001 season before ceasing due to lack of sponsorship. In 2007, the broadcasts once again resumed with a 52-week series. The broadcasts were originally sponsored by BP and air on 98.7 WFMT in Chicago and the WFMT Radio Network. They consist of 39 weeks of recordings of live concerts, as well as highlights from the CSO's vast discography.

The CSO appeared in a series of telecasts on WGN-TV, beginning in 1953. The early 1960s saw the videotaped telecast series Music from Chicago, conducted by Fritz Reiner and guest conductors including Arthur Fiedler, George Szell, Pierre Monteux, and Charles Munch. Many of these televised concerts, from 1953 to 1963, have since been released to DVD by Video Artists International.

Sir Georg Solti also conducted a series of concerts with the Chicago Symphony that were recorded for the European firm Unitel and were broadcast in the 1970s on PBS. They have subsequently been reissued by Decca Video on DVD.

== Civic Orchestra of Chicago ==
Frederick Stock founded the Civic Orchestra of Chicago, the first training orchestra in the United States affiliated with a major symphony orchestra, in 1919. Its goal is to recruit pre-professional musicians and train them as high-level orchestra players. Many alumni have gone on to play for the CSO or other major orchestras.

The Civic Orchestra performs half a dozen orchestral concerts and a chamber music series annually in Symphony Center and in other venues throughout the Chicago area free of charge to the public.

== Music directors and titled positions ==
=== Music Directors ===
- Theodore Thomas (1891–1905)
- Frederick Stock (1905–1942)
- Désiré Defauw (1943–1947)
- Artur Rodziński (1947–1948)
- Rafael Kubelík (1950–1953)
- Fritz Reiner (1953–1962; musical advisor, 1962–1963)
- Jean Martinon (1963–1968)
- Irwin Hoffman (1968–1969, acting music director)
- Sir Georg Solti (1969–1991)
- Daniel Barenboim (1991–2006)
- Riccardo Muti (2010–2023)
- Klaus Mäkelä (designate, effective 2027)

=== Principal Conductor ===
- Bernard Haitink (2006–2010)

=== Other Titled conductors ===
- Carlo Maria Giulini – Principal Guest Conductor (1969–1972)
- Claudio Abbado – Principal Guest Conductor (1982–1985)
- Sir Georg Solti – Music Director Laureate (1991–1997)
- Pierre Boulez – Principal Guest Conductor (1995–2006); Conductor Emeritus (2006–2016)
- Riccardo Muti – Music Director Emeritus for Life (2023–present)

=== Composers-in-residence ===
- John Corigliano (1987–1990)
- Shulamit Ran (1990–1997)
- Augusta Read Thomas (1997–2006)
- Osvaldo Golijov (2006–2010)
- Mark-Anthony Turnage (2006–2010)
- Anna Clyne (2010–2015)
- Mason Bates (2010–2015)
- Elizabeth Ogonek (2015–2018)
- Samuel Adams (2015–2018)
- Missy Mazzoli (2018–2021)
- Jessie Montgomery (2021–2024)

=== Assistant / associate conductors ===
- Arthur Mees – Assistant (1896–1898)
- Frederick Stock – Assistant (1899–1905)
- Eric DeLamarter – Assistant (1918–1933); Associate (1933–1936)
- Hans Lange – Associate, (1936–1943); Conductor (1943–1946)
- Tauno Hannikainen – Assistant (1947–1949); Associate (1949–1950)
- George Schick – Assistant (1950–1952); Associate (1952–1956)
- Walter Hendl – Associate (1958–1964)
- Irwin Hoffman – Assistant (1964–1965); Associate (1965–1968); Conductor (1969–1970)
- Henry Mazer – Associate (1970–1986)
- Kenneth Jean – Associate (1986–1993)
- Michael Morgan – Assistant (1986–1993)
- Yaron Traub – Assistant (1995–1998), Associate (1998–1999)
- William Eddins – Assistant (1995–1998); Associate (1998–1999); Resident (1999–2004)

=== Ravinia Festival ===
- Walter Hendl – Artistic Director (1959–1963)
- Seiji Ozawa – Music Director (1964–1968); Principal Conductor (1969)
- István Kertész – Principal Conductor (1970–1972)
- James Levine – Music Director (1973–1993)
- Christoph Eschenbach – Music Director (1995–2003)
- James Conlon – Music Director (2005–2015)
- Marin Alsop – Artistic Curator (2018–2019); Chief Conductor and Curator (2020–2026)

== Honors and awards ==
The Chicago Symphony Orchestra was voted the best orchestra in the United States and the fifth best orchestra in the world by editors of the British classical music magazine Gramophone in November 2008. The same was said by a panel of critics polled by the classical music website bachtrack in September 2015.

In 2011, the Chicago Symphony Orchestra was inducted into the American Classical Music Hall of Fame.

=== Grammy Awards ===
Recordings by the Chicago Symphony Orchestra and Chorus have earned sixty-five Grammy Awards from the Recording Academy.

Riccardo Muti, former music director, has won two Grammy Awards, both with the Chicago Symphony Orchestra and Chorus, for the recording of Verdi's Messa da Requiem on the CSO Resound label. Duain Wolfe, chorus director, has won two Grammy Awards for his collaboration with the chorus, also for Verdi's Messa da Requiem on the CSO Resound label.

Bernard Haitink, former principal conductor, has won two Grammy Awards, including one with the Chicago Symphony Orchestra for the recording of Shostakovich's Fourth Symphony on the CSO Resound label.

Pierre Boulez, former conductor emeritus and principal guest conductor, won twenty-six Grammy Awards including eight with the Chicago Symphony Orchestra and Chorus. Boulez is the sixth all-time Grammy winner, behind Beyoncé (thirty-two), Sir Georg Solti (thirty-one), Quincy Jones (twenty-eight), Alison Krauss, and Chick Corea (twenty-seven each). Boulez also received the academy's 2015 Lifetime Achievement Award.

Sir Georg Solti, former music director and music director laureate, won thirty-one Grammy Awards. He received seven awards in addition to his twenty-four awards with the Chicago Symphony Orchestra and Chorus. In addition, Sir Georg Solti and producer John Culshaw received the first NARAS Trustees' Award in 1967 for their "efforts, ingenuity, and artistic contributions" in connection with the first complete recording of Richard Wagner's Der Ring des Nibelungen with the Vienna Philharmonic. Solti also received the academy's 1995 Lifetime Achievement Award.

Margaret Hillis, founder and longtime director of the Chicago Symphony Chorus, won nine Grammy Awards for her collaborations with the orchestra and Chorus.

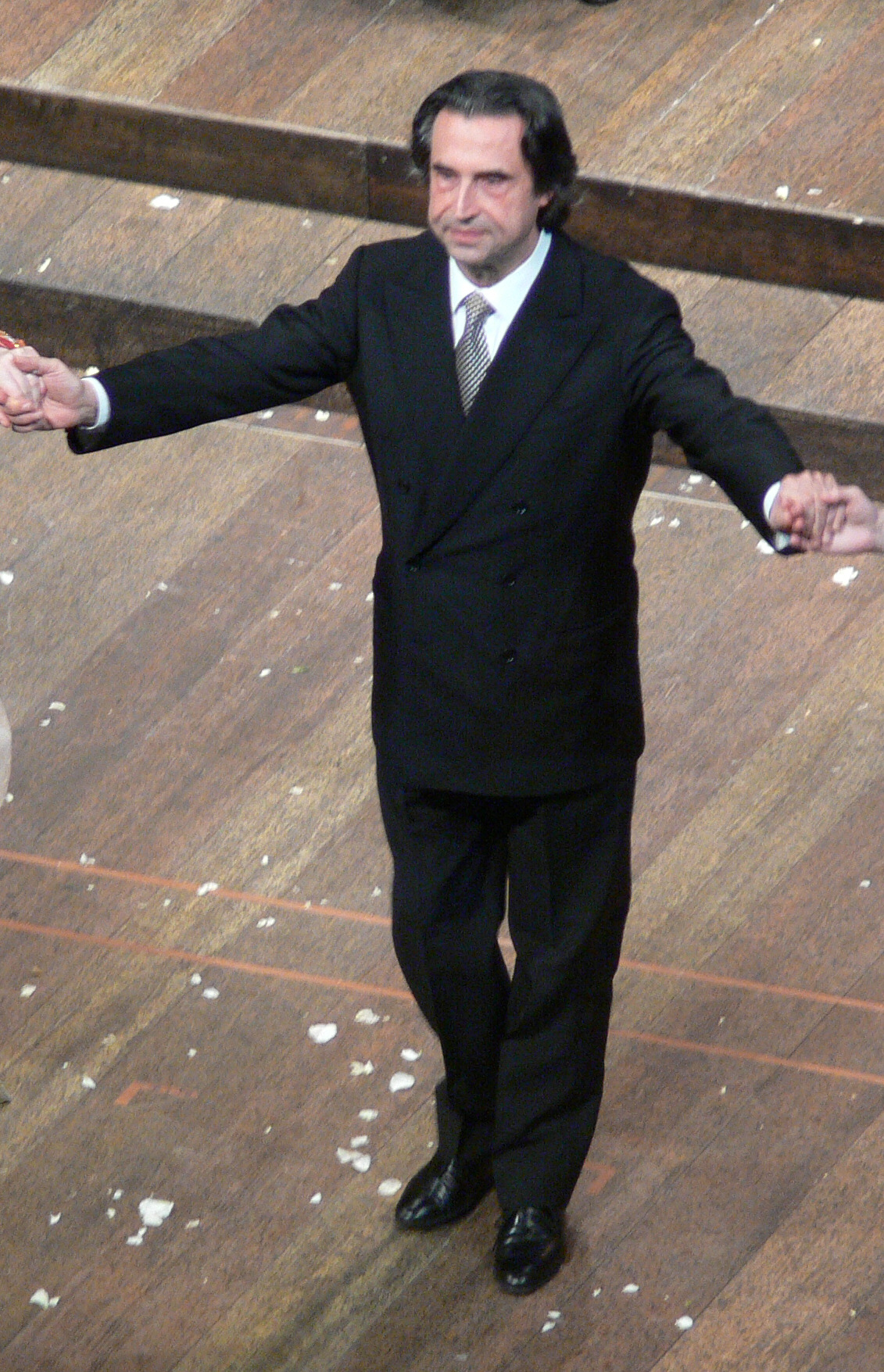
Riccardo Muti

== Volunteer groups ==
- African American Network
- Governing Members (established 1894)
- Latino Alliance
- League of the Chicago Symphony Orchestra Association (formerly the Women's Association, established 1934)
- Overture Council (established 2009)
- Women's Board

== See also ==
- List of museums and cultural institutions in Chicago
- Chicago Symphony Chorus
