= Elizabeth Robson =

British Quaker minister

- Born: 25 June 1771; Bridlington, East Riding of Yorkshire, England
- Died: December 11, 1843 (aged 72); West Derby, Lancashire, England

Elizabeth Robson or Elizabeth Stephenson (25 June 1771 – 11 December 1843) was a British Quaker minister. She travelled to preach including almost four years in America where she visited over 1,000 meetings.

== Life ==
Robson was born in Bridlington, East Riding of Yorkshire in 1771. Her parents were Elizabeth (born Mair) and Isaac Stephenson. Her father was a master mariner and he had been married twice before. Both of her parents were Quakers and they sent her to the Quaker run Ackworth School in Wakefield.

By the time of her marriage in 1796 her parents had died and she had been living with her brother Isaac. She married Thomas Robson and within four years she was acknowledged as a Quaker minister. During their marriage they had six children, but they also spent some time apart as Elizabeth travelled to preach. She and her brother Isaac, who was a miller, had been accepted as ministers in 1810. In 1811, Thomas and Elizabeth made a new home in Sunderland.

A major expedition was to Ireland in 1813 which she completed in the company of her brother. Three years later she set out on a continental tour with William Allen, Charlotte Allen and Elizabeth Fry. They would visit Holland, Germany and Switzerland.

Several women were travelling women preachers but Robson is acknowledged as a leading exponent. In her tour of America over nearly four years she visited 1,134 meetings, she travelled over 18,000 miles and she visited 3,592 families. Robson was preaching the orthodox Quaker view as distinct from the Hicksite group who would cause a schism within the Society of Friends. The American Hicksite preacher Sarah Cadwallader visited every Quaker meeting place in America.

== Death and legacy ==
Robson died in West Derby in 1843 and her husband lived on in Huddersfield until 1852. Her son, Isaac, who was born in 1800 was a successful businessman who in 1844 followed his mother becoming a Quaker minister, Isaac too, would travel internationally to preach.

Some of her records are held by the Quakers and some of her correspondence is held in the National Archives in the UK.
