= Orchestre de Paris =

French symphonic orchestra

- Orchestra
- Founded: 1967; 59 years ago
- Location: Paris, France
- Concert hall: Philharmonie de Paris
- Music director: Klaus Mäkelä
- Website: www.orchestredeparis.com

The Orchestre de Paris (French pronunciation: [ɔʁkɛstʁ də paʁi]) is a French orchestra based in Paris. The orchestra currently performs most of its concerts at the Philharmonie de Paris.

== History ==
In 1967, following the dissolution of the Orchestre de la Société des Concerts du Conservatoire, the French Minister of Culture, André Malraux, and his director of music, Marcel Landowski, engaged conductor Charles Munch to create a new orchestra in Paris. Soon after its creation, Munch died in 1968, and Herbert von Karajan was hired as an interim music advisor from 1969 to 1971. Successive music directors include Sir Georg Solti, Daniel Barenboim, and Semyon Bychkov. Christoph von Dohnányi served as artistic advisor from 1998 to 2000.

During his tenure, Barenboim saw a need for a permanent chorus for the orchestra, and engaged the English chorus master Arthur Oldham to create the Chœur de l'Orchestre de Paris in 1976. Oldham remained with the Chorus till his retirement in 2002. From 2002 to 2011, Didier Bouture and Geoffroy Jourdain shared direction of the Chorus, which is now run by Lionel Sow.

Christoph Eschenbach was music director from 2000 to 2010. He conducted recordings of music of Luciano Berio, Marc-André Dalbavie, and Albert Roussel with the orchestra. In May 2007, Paavo Järvi was named the orchestra's sixth music director, effective from the 2010–11 season. Järvi concluded his tenure in 2016. In June 2015, the orchestra announced the appointments of Daniel Harding as its 9th principal conductor, and of Thomas Hengelbrock as principal guest conductor, effective September 2016. In January 2018, the Orchestre de Paris announced that Harding would stand down as its principal conductor, following the close of the 2018–2019 season.

In June 2019, Klaus Mäkelä first guest-conducted the orchestra. In June 2020, the orchestra announced the appointment of Mäkelä as its next music director, effective with the 2022–2023 season, with an initial contract of 5 seasons. The original intention had been for Mäkelä to hold the post of musical advisor from 2020 to 2022. However, Mäkelä assumed the role of music director in September 2021, one year earlier than originally planned. The orchestra and Mäkelä have recorded commercially for the Decca label. In April 2024, Mäkelä stated his intention to conclude his Orchestre de Paris tenure at the close of the 2026–2027 season.

In September 2025, the orchestra announced the appointment of Esa-Pekka Salonen as its new principal conductor, effective with the 2027-2028 season, with an initial contract of five years. Salonen had first guest-conducted the Orchestre de Paris in 1988.

== Performance venue history ==
In 1998, Crédit Lyonnais, which had control of the Salle Pleyel, sold the hall to the French businessman Hubert Martigny. The Salle Pleyel was closed in 2002, which left the orchestra without a resident hall. The Théâtre des Champs-Élysées and Théâtre du Châtelet both presented the orchestra during the 2001–02 season. By the fall of 2002, the orchestra had secured the Théâtre Mogador, where it played its next four seasons. In 2003, the French government secured a new arrangement whereby Martigny would pay for renovations to the Salle Pleyel, and rent the hall to the Cité de la Musique, which would then be scheduled to purchase the hall in the year 2056. After renovations, the Salle Pleyel reopened in September 2006 and became once more the Orchestre de Paris's home base. The orchestra took up residence at the new Philharmonie de Paris, near the Cité de la Musique in the Parc de la Villette, after the opening of the hall ceremony which took place on 14 January 2015.

== Music directors ==
- Charles Munch (1967–1968)
- Sir Georg Solti (1972–1975)
- Daniel Barenboim (1975–1989)
- Semyon Bychkov (1989–1998)
- Christoph Eschenbach (2000–2010)
- Paavo Järvi (2010–2016)
- Daniel Harding (2016–2019)
- Klaus Mäkelä (2021–present)

=== Other conductors in leadership positions ===
- Herbert von Karajan (musical advisor, 1969–1971)
- Christoph von Dohnányi (artistic advisor, 1998–2000)
- Esa-Pekka Salonen (principal conductor-designate, effective 2027)

== Pop charts ==
The Orchestre de Paris found itself in an unusual situation in 1989, when its performance of Ravel's Boléro became a hit on the Dutch pop chart. The recording, made in 1982 under the direction of Daniel Barenboim, was released as a CD-single to coincide with the success of the song "No more boleros" by the Dutch pop singer Gerard Joling, which included parts of the Ravel work. With its playing time of 17 minutes, the Orchestre de Paris single remains the longest recording ever in the Dutch Top 40.
