= Rüdiger Wohlers =

German tenor (born 1943)

Rüdiger Wohlers (born 4 May 1943) is a German tenor.

== Life ==
Wohlers studied singing at the Hochschule für Musik und Theater Hamburg. He had his first engagements as a soloist from 1968 to 1971 at the Staatstheater Darmstadt. In May 1969 he sang Telemaco in a new production of the opera Il ritorno d'Ulisse in patria by Claudio Monteverdi. 1971 he moved to the Zurich Opera House. There he mainly sang lyrical tenor roles, especially in the operas of Wolfgang Amadeus Mozart: Belmonte in Die Entführung aus dem Serail, Ferrando in Così fan tutte, Don Ottavio in Don Giovanni and Tamino in The magic flute.

From 1974 onwards Wohlers was a member of the Staatstheater Stuttgart. In 1977 he sang Filipeto in the opera I quatro rusteghi in the production by Günther Rennert. In 1984 he sang Don Ottavio on the occasion of the reopening of the restored Stuttgart State Opera. In the 1980s he appeared there in the title role of Harry Kupfer's production of Idomeneo and with Krisztina Laki and Waltraud Meier as Lyonel in the Loriot production of the opera Martha. This production was also shown on television in 1986. He was appointed Kammersänger in recognition of his artistic services to the Stuttgart State Opera.

Regular guest performances led him to the Hamburgische Staatsoper (among others 1984 in L'Ormindo by Francesco Cavalli), to the Bavarian State Opera and to the Vienna State Opera (1973-1980, as Tamino, Belmonte, Ferrando, Don Ottavo, Ernesto in Don Pasquale). From 1977 he sang with Deutsche Oper Berlin. In 1984 he also took part in a tour of Japan with the ensemble of the Hamburg State Opera.

He appeared at the Cologne Opera, at the Opera Frankfurt, at the Schwetzinger Festspiele (1975, as Belmonte), at the Salzburg Festival(1981, as Tamino), at La Scala in Milan (1983, as Ferrando), at the Covent Garden Opera (1990, title role in Idomeneo) and at the Stadttheater Freiburg (1997, as Severin in The Silver Lake by Kurt Weill).

Other important roles of Wohlers were: Fenton in The Merry Wives of Windsor, Lenski in Eugene Onegin, Count Almaviva in The Barber of Seville and Nemorino in L'elisir d'amore.

== Bibliography ==
- Karl-Josef Kutsch, Leo Riemens: Großes Sängerlexikon. Fourth, extended and updated edition. Munich 2003. Volume 7: Suvanny–Zysset, p. 5086, ISBN 3-598-11598-9
