= Krisztina Laki =

Hungarian opera singer and music educator

- Born: 16 September 1944 (age 82); Érd
- Education: Franz Liszt Academy of Music
- Occupation: Operatic coloratura soprano
- Organizations: Deutsche Oper am Rhein

Krisztina Laki (born 16 September 1944) is a Hungarian coloratura soprano who worked mainly on the opera stage in Germany, with guest appearances in major European opera houses. She has held master classes internationally.

== Career ==
Born in Érd, Laki studied voice at the Franz Liszt Academy of Music in Budapest with József Réti. She made her debut in 1971 as Gilda in Verdi's Rigoletto at the Stadttheater Bern, where she also appeared as the Queen of the Night in Mozart's Die Zauberflöte and as Sophie in Der Rosenkavalier by Richard Strauss.

In 1974 to 1979, she sang at the Deutsche Oper am Rhein. She appeared in 1977 at La Scala in Milan as Blonde in Mozart's Die Entführung aus dem Serail, directed by Giorgio Strehler, and alongside Edita Gruberová as Konstanze. From 1980 to 1989 she worked mainly with the Cologne Opera.

Laki retired from the stage in 2001. She has held master classes internationally and has been a juror at music competitions.

== Selected recordings ==
Laki has recorded several little known works, including by composers such as Gottfried von Einem, Pal Esterhazy, Niccolò Jommelli, Josef Mysliveček, Giovanni Paisiello, Antonio Salieri (Lieder), parts in Singspiele by Ernst Theodor Amadeus Hoffmann and Felix Mendelssohn, and notably Zemina in Wagner's early opera Die Feen.

== Awards ==
- Austrian Decoration for Science and Art, 2001
- Verdienstorden of Hungary, 2011
- Honorary Professor of the Hochschule für Künste Bremen, 2011
