= Franz Mazura =

Austrian opera singer and actor (1924–2020)

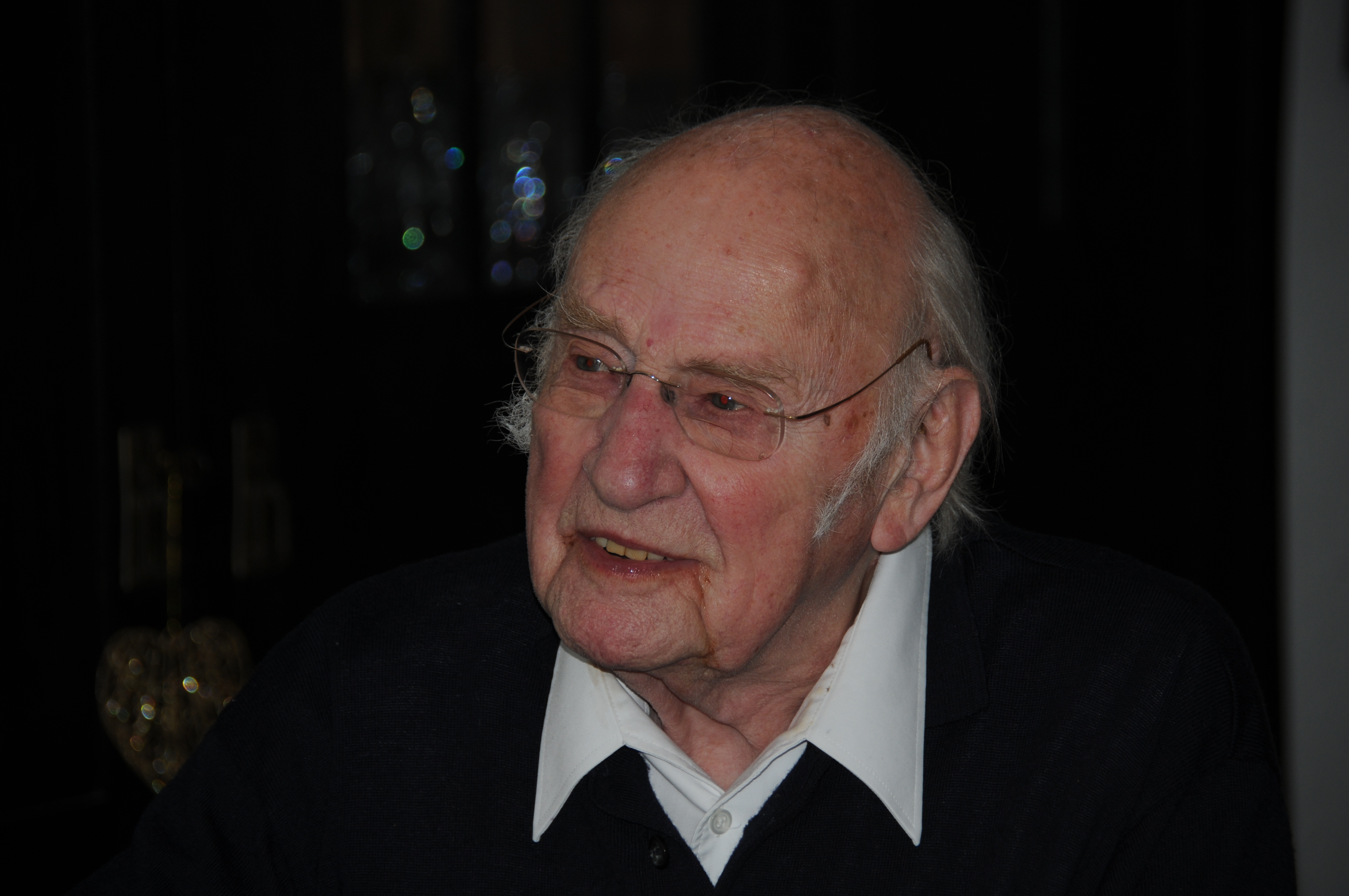
- Franz Mazura in 2015
- Born: 22 April 1924; Salzburg, Austria
- Died: 23 January 2020 (aged 95); Mannheim, Germany
- Education: Hochschule für Musik Detmold
- Occupation: Operatic bass-baritone
- Organizations: Nationaltheater Mannheim; Deutsche Oper Berlin
- Title: Kammersänger
- Spouse: Elisabeth Friedmann (m. 1957; died 2016)
- Children: 2
- Awards: Grammy Awards; Order of Merit of the Federal Republic of Germany

Franz Mazura (22 April 1924 – 23 January 2020) was an Austrian bass-baritone opera singer and actor. He performed at the Bayreuth Festival from 1971 for 25 years and at the Metropolitan Opera for 15 years. He was made a Kammersänger in 1980 and an Honorary Member of the Nationaltheater Mannheim in 1990. He most often played villains and strange characters, with signature roles including Klingsor in Wagner's Parsifal. Mazura took part in world premieres, such as the double role of Dr. Schön and Jack the Ripper in the world premiere of the completed version of Alban Berg's Lulu at the Paris Opera in 1979, and as Abraham in Giorgio Battistelli's Lot in 2017. Two of his recordings received Grammy Awards. His voice was described as with dark timbre, powerful and like granite ("dunkel gefärbt, kräftig und wie Granit"), with perfect diction. His acting ability was described as "well-supplied with vivid imaginative touches, whether deployed in comic roles or characters of inexorable malevolence. Mazura could achieve more impact with a lifted eyebrow or a belligerently thrust chin than many artists could with a ten-minute monologue." He had a long career, appearing at the Staatsoper Berlin the night before his 95th birthday.

== Life ==
Born in Salzburg, Mazura was the son of Maria, a homemaker, and Franz Mazura, a tax inspector. He first studied mechanical engineering. He was drafted in 1942. After World War II, he studied with Frederick Husler at the Hochschule für Musik Detmold, and worked during his studies as an actor at the Landestheater Detmold. He made his debut on the opera stage as a bass at the Staatstheater Kassel in 1949. He then worked at the Staatstheater Mainz, Staatstheater Braunschweig, and Nationaltheater Mannheim, where he was a member of the ensemble from 1958 to 1963. In Mannheim, he was cast more in baritone roles. He recalled the time there as especially pleasant, singing a repertoire of 60 roles and enjoying the collaboration among colleagues. He was a member of the Deutsche Oper Berlin from 1963.

From 1960, he performed at the Salzburg Festival, first as Cassandro in Mozart's La finta semplice, then from 1970 as Pizarro in Beethoven's Fidelio. He had a guest contract with the Hamburg State Opera from 1973. At the Vienna State Opera, he appeared as the Komtur (Commendatore) in Mozart's Don Giovanni, as Pizarro, as La Roche in Capriccio by Richard Strauss and as Jochanaan in Salome, among others. Mazura appeared at the Bayreuth Festival from 1971 for 25 years. He sang the roles of Alberich and Gunther in Der Ring des Nibelungen, Biterolf in Tannhäuser, Marke in Tristan und Isolde, and finally Klingsor in Parsifal. His other Mozart roles included the Speaker of the Temple of Wisdom in Die Zauberflöte.

In 1976, Mazura performed as Alberich in Wagner's Das Rheingold under Georg Solti, staged by Peter Stein. On 24 February 1979, he appeared in the double role of Dr. Schön and Jack the Ripper in the world premiere of the completed version of Alban Berg's Lulu at the Paris Opera, conducted by Pierre Boulez and directed by Patrice Chéreau. In the same opera and theatre, he appeared as Schigolch, first in 2003. He also performed roles such as Scarpia in Puccini's Tosca, the Doctor in Berg's Wozzeck, and in Viktor Ullmann's Der Kaiser von Atlantis. Although he was typecast as a villain, he appeared at Bayreuth a few times in other roles, such as Gurnemanz in Parsifal in 1973, with Eugen Jochum conducting, and Wanderer in Siegfried in 1988, conducted by Daniel Barenboim.

Mazura first appeared at the Metropolitan Opera in New York City in 1980, at age 56, as Dr. Schön/Jack the Ripper in Lulu. He returned regularly for 15 years. A reviewer wrote:

Mazura is a man of commanding stature, both physically and vocally. In the role of Jack the Ripper he brings the opera to its bloody denouement, with an adamant dramatic power that provides the opera's most memorable moment.

Among Mazura's roles at the Met was Alberich in Der Ring des Nibelungen in 1981, conducted by Erich Leinsdorf. In Siegfried, reviewer Donal Henahan found him and Heinz Zednik as Mime the most interesting in their character roles. The same year, he appeared as Creon in Stavinsky's Oedipus Rex. He performed as Gurnemanz and Pizarro in 1983, as Count Waldner in Arabella by Richard Strauss in 1984, alongside Kiri Te Kanawa in the title role and conducted by Marek Janowski, and as the Doctor in Wozzeck in 1995. After repeating Lulu and Parsifal, he was Frank in a new production of Die Fledermaus by Johann Strauss in 1986, and Mr. Flint in Britten's Billy Budd in 1989. His last performances at the Met were again in Lulu, now in the role of Schigolch for three performances in April 2002.

Mazura appeared in 2006 in the narrating role of Charon in Henze's Das Floß der Medusa, which was performed for the composer's 80th birthday at the Berliner Philharmonie, conducted by Simon Rattle, and with Christian Gerhaher as Jean-Charles and Camilla Nylund as La Mort.

Mazura's career as an opera singer was extremely long. He performed in 2017 in the world premiere of Giorgio Battistelli's opera Lot, in the role of Abraham, at age 93. In April 2019, he performed as Meister Hans Schwarz in Wagner's Die Meistersinger von Nürnberg at the Staatsoper Berlin. The final performance of this run was on 21 April, the night before Mazura's 95th birthday.

Mazura lived in Edingen-Neckarhausen since 1964. He died on 23 January 2020.

== Recordings ==
Mazura can be seen on DVD as Gunther in the Jahrhundertring production of Der Ring des Nibelungen, Klingsor in Parsifal, Biterolf in Tannhäuser, Prison-Warden Frank in Die Fledermaus, and Doktor Schön in Lulu.

=== Discography ===
Year	Title	Role(s)	Cast	Conductor, orchestra	Label
1966	Handel: Tamerlano	Tamerlano	Franz Mazura, Helen Donath, Kieth Engen, Raili Kostia, Kari Nurmela	Ferdinand Leitner, Cappella Coloniensis; Kantorei Barmen-Gemarke	CD: Profil Edition Günter Hänssler; Cat: PH11029 (CD released in 2015)
1978	Wagner: Tannhäuser	Biterolf	Gwyneth Jones, Spas Wenkoff, Hans Sotin, Bernd Weikl, Franz Mazura, John Pickering, Robert Schunk	Colin Davis, Bayreuth Festival orchestra and chorus	VHS: Philips; Cat: 070 828-3, DVD: Deutsche Grammophon; Cat: 073-444-6 (DVD released in 2008)
1979	Berg: Lulu	Dr. Schön / Jack the Ripper	Teresa Stratas, Yvonne Minton, Hanna Schwarz, Franz Mazura, Kenneth Riegel, Toni Blankenheim, Robert Tear, Helmut Pampuch	Pierre Boulez, Paris Opera; Orchestre De L'Opéra De Paris	CD: Deutsche Grammophon; Cat: 463-617-2
1979–80	Wagner: Götterdämmerung in Jahrhundertring	Gunther	Gwyneth Jones, Manfred Jung, Gwendolyn Killebrew, Ortrun Wenkel, Katie Clarke, Gabriele Schnaut, Franz Mazura, Fritz Hübner, et al.	Pierre Boulez, Bayreuth Festival orchestra and chorus	VHS: Philips; Cat: 070 401-3, DVD: Deutsche Grammophon; Cat: 0440 073 4057 8 (8 DVD); Götterdämmerung in DVD #6-7 (DVD released in 2005)
1980	Wagner: Parsifal	Klingsor	Bernd Weikl, Kurt Moll, Matti Salminen, James King, Franz Mazura, Yvonne Minton	Rafael Kubelík, Bavarian Radio Symphony Orchestra and chorus, Tölzer Knabenchor	CD: Arts Archives; Cat: 43027-2 (recorded in May 1980; commercially released in 2003)
1980	Berg: Lulu	Dr. Schön / Jack the Ripper	Julia Migenes, Evelyn Lear, Kenneth Riegel, Franz Mazura, Frank Little, Lenus Carlson, Andrew Földi, Hilda Harris	James Levine, Metropolitan Opera orchestra and chorus	DVD: Sony Classical; Cat: 8869 791009 9 (DVD released in 2011)
1985	Schoenberg: Moses und Aron	Moses	Franz Mazura, Philip Langridge	Georg Solti, Chicago Symphony Orchestra; Chicago Symphony Chorus	CD: Decca; Cat: 414 264-2/475 867 8
1987	Wagner: Parsifal	Klingsor	Peter Hofmann, Waltraud Meier, Hans Sotin, Simon Estes, Franz Mazura, Matti Salminen	James Levine, Bayreuth Festival orchestra and chorus	CD: Philips; Cat: 434 616-2
1992	Wagner: Parsifal	Klingsor	Waltraud Meier, Kurt Moll, Siegfried Jerusalem, Bernd Weikl, Franz Mazura, Jan-Hendrik Rootering	James Levine, Metropolitan Opera orchestra and chorus	DVD: Deutsche Grammophon; Cat: 073-032-9; performance of 28 March 1992
1994	Ullmann: Der Kaiser von Atlantis	Der Lautsprecher	Michael Kraus, Walter Berry, Iris Vermillion, Franz Mazura, Herbert Lippert	Lothar Zagrosek, Leipzig Gewandhaus Orchestra	CD: Decca; Cat: 440 854-2

== Awards ==
Mazura appears on two Grammy Award winning recordings: as Dr. Schön in Lulu, conducted by Pierre Boulez (Best Opera Recording 1980), and as Moses in Schoenberg's Moses und Aron, conducted by Sir Georg Solti (Best Opera Recording 1985).

Mazura was made an honorary member of the Nationaltheater Mannheim in 1990. He was awarded the Officer's Cross of the Order of Merit of the Federal Republic of Germany in 2010. In 2015, he received the German theatre prize Der Faust for Lifetime Achievement.
