= Jahrhundertring =

1976 production of Wagner's Ring cycle

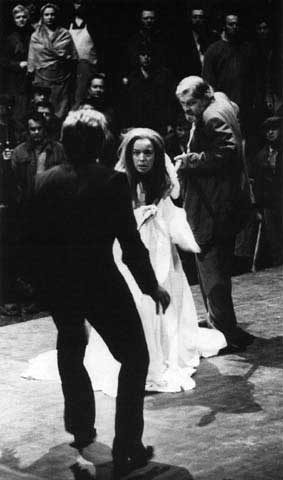
- A scene from Götterdämmerung, the final part of the Ring cycle, in the centenary production at the Bayreuth Festival, conducted by Pierre Boulez and staged by Patrice Chéreau, with Gwyneth Jones as Brünnhilde
- Time: 1976; 1977; 1978; 1979; 1980
- Venue: Bayreuth Festspielhaus

The Jahrhundertring (Centenary Ring) was a production of Richard Wagner's Ring cycle, Der Ring des Nibelungen, first performed at the Bayreuth Festival in 1976. The production was a centennial celebration of both the festival and the first performance of the complete cycle (which took place at the inaugural festival). The production was created by a French team consisting of conductor Pierre Boulez, stage director Patrice Chéreau, stage designer Richard Peduzzi, costume designer Jacques Schmidt, and lighting designer André Diot.

Chéreau ignored the composer's detailed scenic instructions, setting the work in Wagner's time, during the Industrial Revolution, and the production critically treated topics such as capitalism, industrialism, and spirituality. The music interpreted by Boulez was regarded as unusually clear and bright, with light tempos which have been described as "ruthless". The premiere performance provoked controversial reactions, and was said to have nearly started a riot.

The production was run each year from 1976 to 1980, with the performance being filmed for television in 1979 and 1980. After its final showing in 1980, the production received a 45-minute standing ovation. It set a standard for productions of the Ring cycle to follow, and has been called the beginning of Regietheater ('director's theater').

== Centenary ==
Festival director Wolfgang Wagner selected the composer Pierre Boulez as the conductor for the centenary celebration of Wagner's Ring cycle, which had first been performed at the first Bayreuth festival. The conductor's first choice for a stage director was Ingmar Bergman. When he refused, Boulez recommended as stage director Patrice Chéreau. Chéreau brought in the team of stage designer Richard Peduzzi, costume designer Jacques Schmidt and lighting designer André Diot, with all of whom he had collaborated already in his first theatre, the Public-Theatre in the Parisian suburb of Sartrouville, from 1966.

According to Eleonore Büning from the Frankfurter Allgemeine Zeitung, the French team revolutionised the understanding of Wagner in Germany. In an unprecedented choice, the scene was set in the Industrial Revolution, "dressing the gods as capitalists at war with the Nibelung proletariat". Set at the time of the composition, it took a critical view of the time's capitalism, industrialism and spiritual background. The Rhinemaidens appeared as 19th-century cancan dancers and Wotan as a banker in a frock coat. Siegfried enters the hall of the Gibichungs dressed in the "ragged clothes of a mythical hero" and meets Gunther wearing a dinner jacket, visualising how alien the hero is to the world. The director's approach was described as a mix of "a vague sense of 19th-century melodrama with Shaw's messianic socialism and Strindberg's psychodrama.

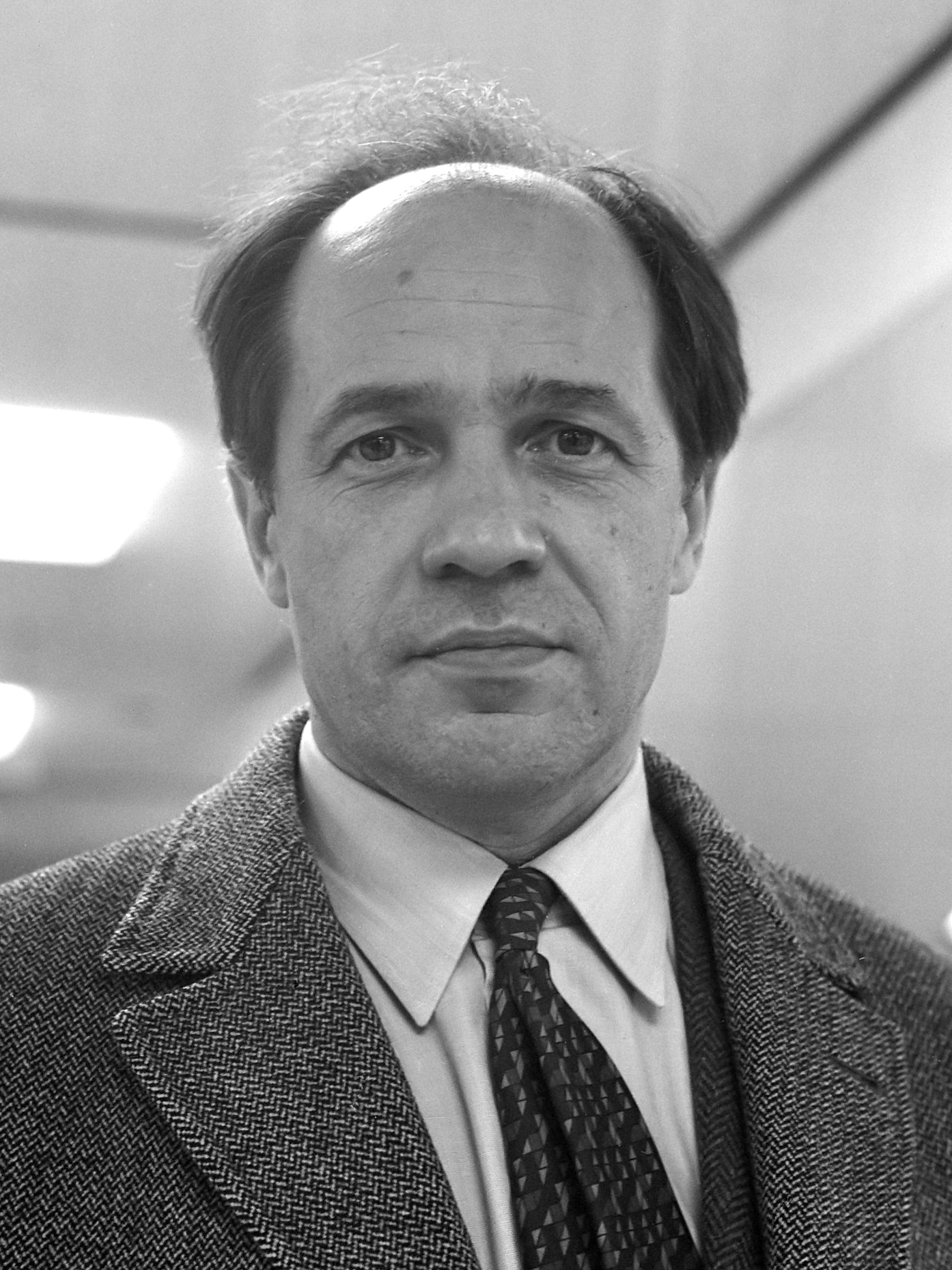
Pierre Boulez
conductor

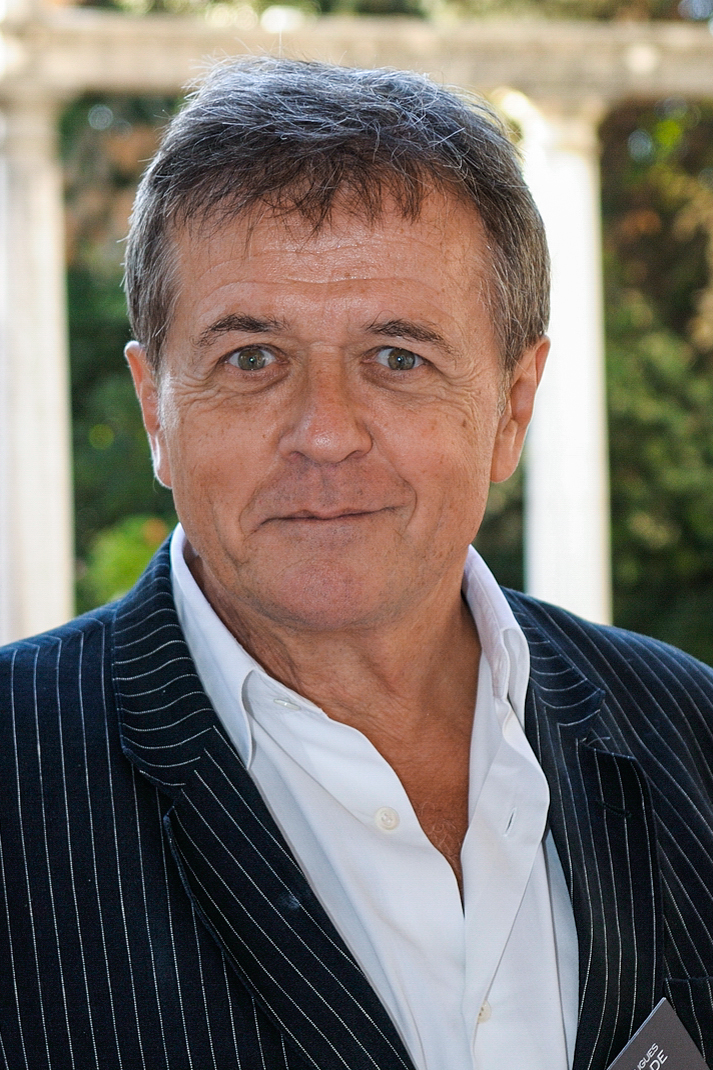
Patrice Chéreau
stage director

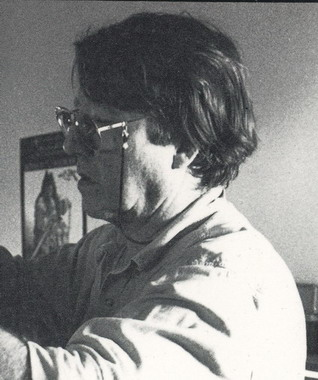
Jacques Schmidt
costume designer

== Singers ==
The following table shows singers from the first year 1976 to the last year, when it was filmed. The parts of Wagner's stage work are abbreviated R for Das Rheingold, W for Die Walküre, S for Siegfried, G for Götterdämmerung.

Singers in Jahrhundertring
Role	In part	Singer 1976	Singer 1977	Singer 1978	Singer 1979	Singer 1980	All
Wotan	R W S	Donald McIntyre	Donald McIntyre	Donald McIntyre	Donald McIntyre	Donald McIntyre	*
Donner	R	Jerker Arvidson	Martin Egel	Martin Egel	Martin Egel	Martin Egel	
Froh	R	Heribert Steinbach	Siegfried Jerusalem	Siegfried Jerusalem	Siegfried Jerusalem	Siegfried Jerusalem	
Loge	R	Heinz Zednik	Heinz Zednik	Heinz Zednik	Heinz Zednik	Heinz Zednik	*
Fricka	R W	Yvonne Minton	Eva Randová	Hanna Schwarz	Hanna Schwarz	Hanna Schwarz	
Freia	R	Rachel Yakar	Carmen Reppel	Carmen Reppel	Carmen Reppel	Carmen Reppel	
Erda	R S	Ortrun Wenkel	Hanna Schwarz	Ortrun Wenkel	Ortrun Wenkel	Ortrun Wenkel	
Alberich	R S G	Zoltán Kelemen	Zoltán Kelemen	Zoltán Kelemen	Hermann Becht	Hermann Becht	
Mime	R	Wolf Appel	Wolf Appel	Helmut Pampuch	Helmut Pampuch	Helmut Pampuch	
Fasolt	R	Matti Salminen	Heikki Toivanen	Heikki Toivanen	Matti Salminen	Matti Salminen	
Fafner	R S	Bengt Rundgren	Matti Salminen	Matti Salminen	Fritz Hübner	Fritz Hübner	
Woglinde	R G	Yoko Kawahara	Norma Sharp	Norma Sharp	Norma Sharp	Norma Sharp	
Wellgunde	R G	Ilse Gramatzki	Ilse Gramatzki	Ilse Gramatzki	Ilse Gramatzki	Ilse Gramatzki	*
Floßhilde	R G	Adelheid Krauss	Cornelia Wulkopf	Marga Schiml	Marga Schiml	Marga Schiml	
Siegmund	W	Peter Hofmann	Robert Schunk	Peter Hofmann	Peter Hofmann	Peter Hofmann	*
Hunding	W	Matti Salminen	Matti Salminen	Matti Salminen	Matti Salminen	Matti Salminen	*
Sieglinde	W	Hannelore Bode	Hannelore Bode	Hannelore Bode	Jeannine Altmeyer	Jeannine Altmeyer	
Brünnhilde	W S G	Gwyneth Jones	Gwyneth Jones	Gwyneth Jones	Gwyneth Jones	Gwyneth Jones	*
Gerhilde	W	Rachel Yakar	Carmen Reppel	Eva Johansson	Carmen Reppel	Carmen Reppel	
Ortlinde	W	Irja Auroora	Astrid Schirmer	Lia Frey-Rabine	Karen Middleton	Karen Middleton	
Waltraute	W	Doris Soffel	Gabriele Schnaut	Silvia Herman	Gabriele Schnaut	Gabriele Schnaut	
Schwertleite	W	Adelheid Krauss	Patricia Payne	Hitomi Katagiri	Gwendolyn Killebrew	Gwendolyn Killebrew	
Helmwige	W	Katie Clarke	Katie Clarke	Eva-Maria Bundschuh	Katie Clarke	Katie Clarke	
Siegrune	W	Alicia Nafé	Cornelia Wulkopf	Linda Finnie	Marga Schiml	Marga Schiml	
Grimgerde	W	Ilse Gramatzki	Ilse Gramatzki	Uta Priew	Ilse Gramatzki	Ilse Gramatzki	
Rossweisse	W	Elisabeth Glauser	Elisabeth Glauser	Hebe Dijkstra	Elisabeth Glauser	Elisabeth Glauser	
Siegfried	S	René Kollo	René Kollo	René Kollo	Manfred Jung	Manfred Jung	
Mime	S	Heinz Zednik	Heinz Zednik	Heinz Zednik	Heinz Zednik	Heinz Zednik	*
Waldvogel (forest bird)	S	Yoko Kawahara	Norma Sharp	Norma Sharp	Norma Sharp	Norma Sharp	
Siegfried	G	Jess Thomas	Manfred Jung	Manfred Jung	Manfred Jung	Manfred Jung	
Gunther	G	Jerker Arvidson	Franz Mazura	Franz Mazura	Franz Mazura	Franz Mazura	
Hagen	G	Karl Ridderbusch	Karl Ridderbusch	Karl Ridderbusch	Fritz Hübner	Fritz Hübner	
Gutrune	G	Irja Auroora	Hannelore Bode	Hannelore Bode	Jeannine Altmeyer	Jeannine Altmeyer	
Waltraute	G	Yvonne Minton	Yvonne Minton	Yvonne Minton	Gwendolyn Killebrew	Gwendolyn Killebrew	
First Norn	G	Ortrun Wenkel	Patricia Payne	Patricia Payne	Ortrun Wenkel	Ortrun Wenkel	
Second Norn	G	Dagmar Trabert	Gabriele Schnaut	Gabriele Schnaut	Gabriele Schnaut	Gabriele Schnaut	
Third Norn	G	Hannelore Bode	Katie Clarke	Katie Clarke	Katie Clarke	Katie Clarke	

Alternate singers were in 1976 Hans Sotin as Wotan and Karl Ridderbusch as Hunding, Roberta Knie as Brünnhilde in Götterdämmerung and Bengt Rundgren as Hagen. In 1977, Patrice Chéreau acted the part of Siegfried in one performance of Siegfried, because singer René Kollo had broken his leg. In 1978, Astrid Schirmer performed Sieglinde in Walküre, Jean Cox sang the part of Siegfried in one performance of Siegfried. The singers for the production had to act as much as to sing, especially for the filming in 1980.

== Reception ==
The Ring production was initially met with controversial reactions, provoking "a near-riot", due to its controversial setting of the saga in the Industrial revolution, with the Rhinemaidens as prostitutes. Later it was understood as "a thoughtful allegory of man's exploitation of natural resources". Winifred Wagner, the then elderly matriarch of the Wagner dynasty, disliked the production but asked rhetorically "isn't it better to be furious than to be bored?". After its final performance on 25 August 1980 the production was celebrated in a 45-minute standing ovation. It set a standard for productions of the Ring cycle to follow. Called the beginning of Regietheater ('director's theater'), the production influenced directors and designers.

While opera critic Michael Tanner from the BBC criticised Boulez's "ruthless tempi" and "pervasive lack of expressiveness", James Leonard noted: "... more controversial than Chéreau's dramatic conception was Boulez's musical execution. With startlingly clear textures, spectacularly bright colors, and stunningly light tempos, Boulez obtains a Wagner sound like no other. And for those with ears to hear, it works. Wagner's music doesn't have to be murky to be metaphysical or massive to be overwhelmingly moving and Boulez gets playing from the too-often turgid Bayreuth Festival Orchestra that makes the music crackle and blaze with musical and dramatic meaning." Edward Rothstein wrote for the New York Times: "Aspects of the score emerge with unexpected clarity. In the opening of 'Die Walküre', he deliberately understates the bass line, giving the music's aggressive restlessness an eerie disembodied character. Throughout 'The Ring', filigree and details are crisply articulated without undue stress on the leitmotifs; nothing is made sentimental or obvious. Particularly drawn to the intricately shifting sound world of the late, last opera, Mr. Boulez gives it a dramatic sweep along with a crystalline gleam."

The production was filmed for television in 1979 and 1980. Die Walküre was shown in the ARD on 28 August 1980. The cycle was shown completely in 1983, in commemoration of the composer's death, and also presented in cinemas internationally. For the television broadcasts, directed by Brian Large, prior to their repeat on BBC2 in 1983 Rodney Milnes commented that the "television realization, too, is enormously skilful in a largely unobtrusive fashion", adding "Dr Large has faithfully caught the 'feel' of the Chéreau staging with all its strengths and possible weaknesses".
