= Bernd Weikl =

Austrian operatic baritone (born 1942)

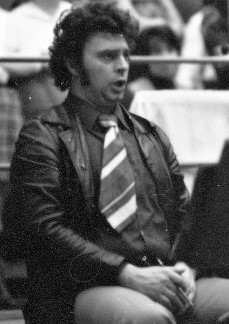
- Weikl singing with the Staatskapelle Dresden in 1973
- Born: 29 July 1942 (age 83); Vienna
- Education: Peter Cornelius Conservatory; Musikhochschule Hannover
- Occupation: Operatic baritone

Bernd Weikl (born 29 July 1942) is an Austrian operatic baritone, particularly known for his performances in the stage works by Richard Wagner. He also has written books and directed operas.

== Career ==
Born in Vienna, he moved with his family to Mainz when he was ten years old. Weikl studied first in Mainz, national economics, and from 1962 to 1965 at the conservatory. He then studied voice at the Musikhochschule Hannover with Naan Pöld und William Reimer). He made his stage debut as Ottokar in Weber's Der Freischütz at the Staatsoper Hannover. From 1970 to 1973 he was a member of the company at the Düsseldorf Opera.

Weikl made his debut at the Salzburg Festival in 1971 as Melot in Wagner's Tristan und Isolde, at the Bayreuth Festival in 1972 as Wolfram in Tannhäuser, at the Royal Opera House in London in 1975 as Figaro in Rossini's The Barber of Seville, at the Metropolitan Opera in 1977 as Wolfram, and at La Scala in Milan in 1980 as Ford in Verdi's Falstaff.

== Roles ==
Weikl has performed around 120 roles during his career, in five languages. He is known for Hans Sachs in Wagner's Die Meistersinger von Nürnberg, which he has sung in major opera houses of the world. Other roles include:

- The title roles in Mozart's Don Giovanni, Verdi's Rigoletto, Tchaikovsky's Eugene Onegin and Wagner's Der fliegende Holländer
- Count Almaviva in Mozart's Il nozze di Figaro
- Amfortas in Wagner's Parsifal
- Belcore in Donizetti's L'elisir d'amore
- Luna in Verdi' sIl trovatore
- Eisenstein in Die Fledermaus by Johann Strauss
- Ford in Verdi's Falstaff
- Golaud in Debussy's Pelléas et Mélisande
- Guglielmo in Mozart's Così fan tutte
- Jochanaan in Salome by Richard Strauss
- Mandryka in Arabella by Richard Strauss
- Cardinal Morone in Pfitzner's Palestrina
- Rodrigo in Verdi's Don Carlos
- Tomsky in Tchaikovsky's Pique Dame
- Zurga in Bizet's Les pêcheurs de perles
- Wolfram in Wagner's Tannhäuser

== Recordings ==
- Orff's Carmina Burana, with James Levine conducting the Chicago Symphony Orchestra and Chorus, with June Anderson and Philip Creech (1984) (DG)
- Eugene Onegin, title role with Georg Solti conducting the orchestra of the Royal Opera House, with Teresa Kubiak, Stuart Burrows, Julia Hamari, and Nicolai Ghiaurov, also used as the score of Petr Weigl's filming of the opera
- Die Fledermaus, with Carlos Kleiber conducting the Orchestra of the Bavarian State Opera, with Hermann Prey, Julia Varady, Lucia Popp, René Kollo, and Ivan Rebroff (1975) (DG)
- Der fliegende Holländer, with Giuseppe Sinopoli conducting the Berlin State Opera Orchestra, with Cheryl Studer, Hans Sotin, Plácido Domingo, Peter Seiffert, and Uta Priew (1991)
- Der Freischütz, with Carlos Kleiber conducting the Staatskapelle Dresden, with Gundula Janowitz, Edith Mathis, Peter Schreier, Theo Adam, Siegfried Vogel, Franz Crass, (1973) (DG)
- Wagner's Götterdämmerung, with Levine conducting the Metropolitan Opera Orchestra, with Hildegard Behrens, Reiner Goldberg, Matti Salminen, Hanna Schwarz, Cheryl Studer, Bernd Weikl, Ekkehard Wlaschiha (1991) (1992 Grammy Award for Best Opera Recording)
- Wagner's Lohengrin, with Woldemar Nelsson conducting the Bayreuth Festival, with Peter Hofmann, Karan Armstrong (1982) (CBS)
- Die Meistersinger von Nürnberg, with Horst Stein conducting the Orchester der Bayreuther Festspiele, Siegfried Jerusalem, Hermann Prey, Mari Anne Häggander, Graham Clark. Staged by Wolfgang Wagner, Video Director Brian Large, (1984) (Unitel), VHS
- Parsifal, with Rafael Kubelík conducting the Bavarian Radio Symphony Orchestra, with James King, Kurt Moll and Yvonne Minton, (1980) (Arts Archives, stereo)
- Rigoletto, with Lamberto Gardelli, conducting the Münchner Rundfunkorchester, with Giacomo Aragall and Lucia Popp (1984) (RCA)
- Ermanno Wolf-Ferrari's Il segreto di Susanna, with Lamberto Gardelli, conducting the Orchestra of the Royal Opera House Covent Garden, with Maria Chiara and Omar Godknow (1977) (Decca)
- Eugen d'Albert's Tiefland, Marek Janowski, conducting the Münchner Rundfunkorchester, with Eva Marton and René Kollo (1983) (ARTS 47501-2)
- Ruggero Leoncavallo's La Bohème, with Heinz Wallberg conducting the Munich Symphony Orchestra, with Lucia Popp and Franco Bonisolli. (1982) (Orfeo)
- Johann Rudolf Zumsteeg (1760-1802) Balladen with Wolfgang Sawallisch on piano Die Entführung (The Abduction), Des Pfarrers Tochter von Taubenhain (The Pastor's Daughter of Taubenhain) (1983) (Orfeo)

== Book publications ==
Weikl has published books about German music, including Swastikas on Stage and Freispruch für Richard Wagner? (Acquittal for Richard Wagner?).
