= Hannelore Bode =

German operatic soprano

- Born: 2 August 1941 (age 84); Berlin, Germany
- Education: Salzburg Mozarteum
- Occupation: Operatic soprano
- Organizations: Theater Bonn; Deutsche Oper am Rhein; Bayreuth Festival

Hannelore Bode (born 2 August 1941) is a German operatic soprano. She performed at the Bayreuth Festival from 1968 to 1978, including Elsa in Lohengrin, Eva in Die Meistersinger von Nürnberg, and several parts in the 1976 Jahrhundertring, including Sieglinde in Die Walküre. She performed internationally and recorded operas with conductors such as Eugen Jochum, Silvio Varviso and Pierre Boulez.

== Career ==
Bode was born in Berlin. She studied there for two years with Ria Schmitz-Gohr in Berlin, then at the Salzburg Mozarteum and with Fred Husler. She was first engaged at the Theater Bonn in 1964. In the 1967/68 season, she sang with the Theater Basel, the following season with the Deutsche Oper am Rhein.

Bode performed at the Bayreuth Festival from 1968 to 1978, including Elsa in Lohengrin (from 1971) and Eva in Die Meistersinger von Nürnberg (from 1973). She performed several parts in the Jahrhundertring, the 1976 centenary performance of Wagner's Der Ring des Nibelungen, staged by Patrice Chéreau, Sieglinde in Die Walküre, and Gutrune and the third Norn in Götterdämmerung.

She appeared internationally, performing Sieglinde also at the Vienna State Opera in 1976, conducted by Horst Stein, staged by Herbert von Karajan in a set by Emil Preetorius, with Hans Beirer as Siegmund, Hans Sotin as Hunding, Theo Adam as Wotan, and Ute Vinzing as Brünnhilde. She sang in Washington in 1975 as Elsa in a production of the Deutsche Oper Berlin and at Covent Garden in 1977 the leading part of Agathe in Weber's Der Freischütz, She appeared as Elisabeth in Wagner's Tannhäuser at the Cologne Opera in 1980, alongside Jean Cox in the title role and conducted by Hans Wallat. She performed Eva both at the Teatro Colón in Buenos Aires in 1980 and at the San Francisco Opera in 1981.

In 1996, she sang in the contemporary opera Amandas Traum by Harold Weiss.

== Recordings ==
Bode appears as a Flower Maiden on a 1971 live recording of Parsifal in Bayreuth, conducted by Eugen Jochum. She is Eva in Die Meistersinger von Nürnberg in a 1974 live recording from Bayreuth, conducted by Silvio Varviso, in a cast with Karl Ridderbusch as Sachs, Jean Cox as Stolzing and Anna Reynolds as Magdalene. A review noted: "Hannelore Bode as Eva has a somewhat light voice but for once spares us the maternal flavor that seems to affect many an Eva." She appears in the part again in 1975, with Norman Bailey as Sachs and René Kollo as Stolzing, and with Georg Solti conducting Wiener Philharmoniker. In 1970, she performed again a Flower Maiden in Parsifal, now with Pierre Boulez conducting the Bayreuth Festival Orchestra, with James King in the title role and Gwyneth Jones as Kundry.
