= Silvio Varviso =

Swiss conductor (1924-2006)

Silvio Varviso reads the placard advertising his debut performance at the Metropolitan Opera, in 1961.

Silvio Varviso (26 February 1924 – 1 November 2006) was a Swiss conductor who spent most of his career devoted to conducting opera. He began his conducting career working in minor opera houses in Switzerland in the mid-1940s. He became the principal conductor of the opera house in Basel in 1956 where he served for six years. In the late 1950s he began appearing with major opera houses on the international stage as a guest conductor. During the 1960s, he became a fixture at the Metropolitan Opera in New York City and at the Royal Opera House in London. In 1965 he became the music director of the Royal Swedish Opera, and later in his career served as the music director of the Staatsoper Stuttgart and the Paris Opera. During the early 1990s he became a permanent guest conductor at the Vlaamse Opera where he remained active up until his death.

== Early life and career ==
Although Silvio Varviso's father was a voice teacher, Varviso avoided this art. While attending the Zurich Conservatory he studied the piano, violin, clarinet, trumpet and percussion instruments. He continued his study of conducting after graduating with the Austrian conductor Clemens Krauss in Vienna.

Varviso made his conducting debut at age 20 leading Mozart's The Magic Flute at the Stadttheater in St. Gallen, Switzerland. Over the next several years he worked as a guest conductor with minor houses throughout Switzerland. He became principal conductor of the Theater Basel (1956–1962) where he led several productions of operas by Mozart and works from the bel canto repertory. He also conducted the first German-language performance of Prokofiev's The Fiery Angel.

== Early international success ==
During the late 1950s Varviso made a number or notable guest conducting debuts, including the Deutsche Oper Berlin (1958), Paris Opera (1958), and the San Francisco Opera (1959), the latter being his first conducting assignment in the United States. In 1958 he conducted the world premiere of Heinrich Sutermeister's Titus Feuerfuchs at the Brussels World Fair. On 10 October 1961 he returned to San Francisco to conduct the United States premiere of Britten's A Midsummer Night's Dream. He conducted The Marriage of Figaro for his first performance at the Glyndebourne Festival in 1962 followed by a production of Der Rosenkavalier for his debut with Covent Garden later that year. He returned often to the Royal Opera throughout the rest of his career, conducting a wide repertoire which ranged from standard works by Mozart, Puccini, Strauss, and Wagner, to less frequently performed operas like Debussy's Pelléas et Mélisande.

== Working at the Met ==
On 26 November 1961, Varviso made his conducting debut at the Metropolitan Opera in a production of Donizetti's Lucia di Lammermoor. The evening also marked the occasion of Dame Joan Sutherland's debut at the house, portraying Lucia opposite Richard Tucker's Edgardo. Varviso became a regular conductor at the Met during the 1960s, conducting 142 performances at the house through 1969. The operas he conducted at the Met included Puccini's Madama Butterfly with Dorothy Kirsten as Cio-Cio-San, Johann Strauss II's Die Fledermaus with Theodor Uppman as Eisenstein and Jeanette Scovotti as Adele, Cilea's Adriana Lecouvreur with Renata Tebaldi in the title role and Franco Corelli as Maurizio, La sonnambula with Sutherland as Amina and Nicolai Gedda as Elvino, Tosca with Gabriella Tucci in the title role and Anselmo Colzani as Scarpia, The Magic Flute with Anna Moffo as Pamina and Gianna D'Angelo as the Queen of the Night, Ariadne auf Naxos with Gladys Kuchta in the title role and Roberta Peters as Zerbinetta, Aida with Birgit Nilsson in the title role, Don Pasquale with Fernando Corena in the title role, The Tales of Hoffmann with William Dooley playing the four villains, The Barber of Seville with Reri Grist in her house debut as Rosina opposite George Shirley's Count Almaviva, Don Giovanni with Cesare Siepi in the title role and Martina Arroyo as Donna Anna, and Faust with Pilar Lorengar as Marguerite.

== Later life and career ==
In 1965, Varviso was appointed music director at the Royal Swedish Opera in Stockholm, a position held for six years. During that time he also frequently conducted at the Bavarian State Opera, the Hamburg State Opera, and the Vienna State Opera. Up until this point he had conducted no Wagner and in 1969 he embarked on an ambitious campaign to add several core Wagnerian works, beginning with The Flying Dutchman at the Bayreuth Festival. He returned to the Bayreuth Festival many times, conducting Wagner works during the 1970s and 1980s. (His recorded live performance of Die Meistersinger von Nürnberg from the Bayreuth Festival 1974, starring Jean Cox, Karl Ridderbusch, and Hans Sotin is one of the standard-setting recordings of this work, and has been available since the vinyl days.) In 1972, he became the artistic director of the Staatsoper Stuttgart where he served for eight years. In 1974, he took on the same role at the Paris Opera, as well. He worked with the Paris Opéra until 1985. In 1983 he returned to the Met for one last assignment after a 14-year absence at the house. He conducted his final and 147th performance at the house on 2 April 1983 with a production of Wagner's Die Walküre with Dame Gwyneth Jones as Brünnhilde and Manfred Jung as Siegmund.

In 1991 Varviso became a permanent guest conductor at the Vlaamse Opera in Antwerp, where he remained until the end of his career. While there he largely moved away from the German repertory that had been his focus since 1969 and back into the Italian repertory. He spent the last years of his career working especially on the seminal operas by Puccini. His last appearances on the podium was conducting Puccini's Tosca on 19 September 2006 in Antwerp.

Varviso lived in Basel and on the Côte d'Azur. He died in Antwerp on 1 November 2006 at the age of 82.

Among his studio recordings are, for Decca, L'italiana in Algeri (with Teresa Berganza and Luigi Alva, 1963), Il barbiere di Siviglia (with Berganza, 1964), Cavalleria rusticana (with Elena Souliotis, Mario del Monaco, and Tito Gobbi, 1966), Norma (with Souliotis and del Monaco, 1967), and Anna Bolena (with Souliotis, Marilyn Horne, and John Alexander, 1968–69).

Among live recordings he has conducted the live performance of Die Meistersinger von Nürnberg at the Bayreuth Festival in 1974 (with Karl Ridderbusch, Jean Cox, Hannelore Bode, and Klaus Hirte), issued by Philips.
