= Astrid Schirmer =

German operatic soprano

- Astrid Schirmer, in the 1980s
- Born: 8 November 1942; Berlin, Germany
- Died: 8 September 2024 (aged 81)
- Education: Musikhochschule Berlin
- Occupation: Operatic soprano
- Organizations: Staatsoper Hannover; Essen Opera; Nationaltheater Mannheim; Musikhochschule Hannover
- Title: Kammersängerin

Astrid Schirmer (8 November 1942 – 8 December 2024) was a German operatic soprano and an academic teacher. She sang mostly dramatic roles at major German opera houses, including the title roles of Verdi's Aida and Arabella by R. Strauss, and of Puccini's Tosca and Turandot. At the Bayreuth Festival, she appeared as both Ortlinde and Sieglinde in the Jahrhundertring.

== Career ==
Schirmer studied voice at the Musikhochschule Berlin with Johanna Rakow and Elisabeth Grümmer. She made her debut at the Landestheater Coburg in 1967 as Senta in Wagner's Der fliegende Holländer. She was a member of the Staatsoper Hannover, the Essen Opera and the Nationaltheater Mannheim.

Her roles were mostly leading roles as a dramatic soprano, such as Leonore in Beethoven's Fidelio and Wagner's Sieglinde in Die Walküre, Brünnhilde in Siegfried, and both Elisabeth and Venus in Tannhäuser. She also appeared in Verdi operas, in the title role of Aida, as Amelia in Un ballo in maschera, and as Leonore in La forza del destino. She performed the title roles of Ariadne auf Naxos and Arabella by Richard Strauss, and of Puccini's Tosca and Turandot. At the Staatsoper Hannover, she appeared as Miss Wingrave in Britten's Owen Wingrave, conducted by George Alexander Albrecht, with Gerhard Faulstich in the title role. A versatile singer, she also appeared as Donna Anna in Mozart's Don Giovanni, Santuzza in Mascagni's Cavalleria rusticana, Bess in Gershwin's Porgy and Bess, and Lady Billows in Britten's Albert Herring. She also sang concerts and oratorios.

Schirmer sang as a guest at major opera houses in Germany such as the Deutsche Oper Berlin, Deutsche Oper am Rhein, Oper Frankfurt, the Cologne Opera and the Stuttgart State Opera. She performed at the Teatro Liceo in Barcelona and the Opernhaus Zürich.

She appeared as a guest at the Bayreuth Festival, in 1977 as Ortlinde in Wagner's Die Walküre, and in 1978 in the same work in the leading part of Sieglinde. Both performances were part of the production Jahrhundertring, staged by Patrice Chéreau and conducted by Pierre Boulez.

Schirmer was awarded the title Kammersängerin in Mannheim on 7 July 1981, together with Michael Davidson and Franz Mazura. She was a voice teacher at the Musikhochschule Hannover. Among her students was Daniel Eggert.

=== Personal life ===
Schirmer was married to the conductor Carl von Pfeil; their son Alexander von Pfeil became an opera director.

Schirmer died on 8 December 2024, at the age of 81.
