= Norma Sharp =

American operatic soprano (born 1943)

- Born: July 20, 1943 (age 81); Shawnee, Oklahoma, US
- Education: University of Kansas; Musikhochschule Hamburg; Musikhochschule Köln
- Occupations: Operatic soprano; Academic voice teacher
- Organizations: Badisches Staatstheater Karlsruhe; Bayreuth Festival; Hochschule für Musik "Hanns Eisler"

Norma Sharp (born July 20, 1943) is an American operatic soprano. She is known for singing Mozart and Richard Strauss, but also sang Wagner roles at the Bayreuth Festival. She worked mostly in Germany, made an international career, and has been a professor of voice at the Hochschule für Musik "Hanns Eisler" from 1992.

== Career ==
Sharp was born in Shawnee, Oklahoma, and studied voice and musicology at the University of Kansas. She continued her studies on a scholarship at the Musikhochschule Hamburg with Helmut Melchert and at the Musikhochschule Köln with Peter Witsch. She was a member of the Badisches Staatstheater Karlsruhe. Her voice, termed lyric and "jugendlich-dramatisch" (spinto), led to preferred interpretation of roles in operas by Mozart and Richard Strauss.

She appeared in London at Covent Garden, in Glasgow at the Scottish Opera and in 1978 at the Glyndebourne Festival as Donna Anna in Mozart's Don Giovanni. She sang the part of the countess in Mozart's Le nozze di Figaro at her debut at La Scala in Milan.

Sharp performed at the Bayreuth Festival from 1977 to 1981, singing parts in the Jahrhundertring, the centenary performance of Wagner's Der Ring des Nibelungen staged by Patrice Chéreau in 1976. She appeared as the Rhine Maiden Woglinde in Das Rheingold and Götterdämmerung, and Waldvogel (Voice of a forest bird) in Siegfried, also in the version filmed in 1980. In Parsifal, she sang one of the flower maidens.

In recital, she is focused on German romantic and contemporary Lieder, accompanied by pianists such as Irwin Gage, Wilhelm von Grunelius and Wolfram Rieger.

From 1992 she has been a professor of voice at the Hochschule für Musik "Hanns Eisler" in Berlin.

== Selected recordings ==
Sharp appeared in her Bayreuth performances on film – the Ring cycle filmed in 1980 and Parsifal in 1982. She sang Waldvogel and Gutrune in the 1983 Ring digital recording with Marek Janowski conducting the Staatskapelle Dresden, with Theo Adam as Wotan, Jessye Norman as Sieglinde, Siegfried Jerusalem as Siegmund, and René Kollo as Siegfried.
