= Jacques Schmidt =

French costume designer

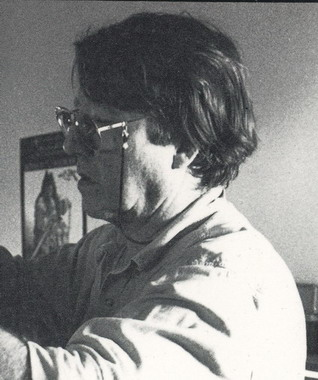
- Born: 16 March 1933; Briançon, Hautes-Alpes, France
- Died: 8 September 1996 (aged 63); Paris, France
- Occupation: Costume designer

Jacques Schmidt (16 March 1933 – 8 September 1996) was a French costume designer, who collaborated regularly with stage directors Antoine Bourseiller, Patrice Chéreau and Roger Planchon.

== Early life and education ==
Schmidt was born in Briançon, Hautes-Alpes, on 16 March 1933. From age 16, he studied at the school for Haute Couture in Paris. He worked for the troupe at the Sorbonne as both actor and costume designer.

== Career ==
In 1952, He participated in the production of Die Perser by Aeschylus in Freiburg im Breisgau. From 1953 he worked exclusively as costume designer.

From the 1960s he worked for Patrice Chéreau, the artistic director of the Public-Theatre in the Parisian suburb of Sartrouville. The team there included stage designer Richard Peduzzi and lighting designer André Diot. They collaborated in many later productions, including in 1976 the Jahrhundertring, to celebrate the centenary of Wagner's cycle Der Ring des Nibelungen and the Bayreuth Festival, conducted by Pierre Boulez. In a collaboration with the same team, he designed the costumes for the first performance of the three-act version of Alban Berg's Lulu, completed by Friedrich Cerha, at the Paris Opera on 24 February 1979, again conducted by Boulez and with sets by Richard Peduzzi, with Teresa Stratas in the title role.

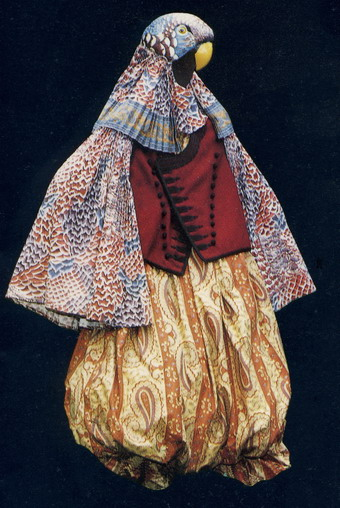
Costume by Schmidt for Les Oiseaux by Aristophanes, 1985

In film, Schmidt created in 1975 the costumes for La Chair de l'orchidée, an adaptation of the 1948 novel The Flesh of the Orchid by mystery writer James Hadley Chase, for Chéreau's first film. Schmidt also created the costumes for 1976 Roman Polanski's film The Tenant (Le locataire) and the 1978 film Perceval le Gallois by Éric Rohmer.

In 1985 he designed in collaboration with Emmanuel Peduzzi costumes for Aristophanes' Les Oiseaux, staged by Jean-Louis Barrault at the Théâtre Renaud-Barrault in Paris. He worked at Chéreau's Théâtre des Amandiers, for example in 1985 in a production of Paul Claudel's La Ville staged by Bernard Sobel. In 1991 he designed with Emmanuel Peduzzi for the San Francisco Opera 650 "historically appropriate costumes" (including "uniforms recycled from Hollywood") for a large-scale production of Serge Prokofiev's opera Voina y Mir (War and Peace), staged by Jérôme Savary and conducted by Valery Gergiev. Again with Emmanuel Peduzzi, Schmidt designed in 1995 the costumes for Mozart's Le nozze di Figaro at the Salzburg Festival, conducted by Nikolaus Harnoncourt (1995) and staged by Luc Bondy in sets by Richard Peduzzi.

Schmidt died of cancer in Paris on 8 September 1996, at the age of 63.

== Awards ==
- 1988 Molière Award for best costumes: George Dandin (staged by Roger Planchon)
- 1989 Molière Award for best costumes: Hamlet (staged by Patrice Chéreau)
- Chevalier des Arts et des Lettres
