= Elisabeth Grümmer =

German soprano (1911-1986)

- Born: Elisabeth Schilz; 31 March 1911; Niederjeutz, Alsace-Lorraine, German Empire
- Died: 6 November 1986 (aged 75); Warendorf, North Rhine-Westphalia, West Germany
- Occupations: Soprano singer; teacher
- Years active: 1940–1986
- Organisation: Berlin Musikhochschule
- Spouse: Detlev Grümmer (died 1944)

Elisabeth Grümmer (née Schilz; 31 March 1911 – 6 November 1986) was a German soprano. She has been described as "a singer blessed with elegant musicality, warm-hearted sincerity, and a voice of exceptional beauty".

== Life ==
Elisabeth Schilz was born in Niederjeutz [now Yutz, near Diedenhofen (Thionville), Alsace-Lorraine] to German parents. In 1918, her family was expelled from Lorraine, and they settled in Meiningen, where she studied theater and made her stage debut as Klärchen in Goethe's Egmont.

She married the concertmaster of the theater orchestra, Detlev Grümmer, and became a mother. The family moved to Aachen, where they met Herbert von Karajan under whose encouragement she made her operatic debut in 1940, in the role of First Flowermaiden in a 1940 performance of Wagner's Parsifal. She went on from Aachen to perform in Duisburg and Prague.

Her husband was killed in their house during the bombing of Aachen in 1944. After the war, she settled in Berlin, singing at the Städtische Oper Berlin. She performed in the major opera houses in Europe and the United States, restricting herself to a small number of roles, primarily sung in German. She was also active in song recitals and concert performances, particularly of Brahms' German Requiem.

The Kammersängerin became a professor at the Berlin Musikhochschule. Among her students were Astrid Schirmer, Gillian Rae-Walker, and Janis Kelly.

Grümmer died in Warendorf, Westphalia on 6 November 1986.

== Work and critical reception ==
Grümmer was acclaimed both as an opera singer and as a lieder interpreter. The book, The Grove Book of Opera Singers, referred to her "beautiful voice, clarity of diction and innate musicianship" evidenced by her legacy on record.

She appeared in two videotaped performances as Donna Anna in Don Giovanni, one conducted by Wilhelm Furtwängler and the other in German translation conducted by Ferenc Fricsay.

== Discography ==
=== Operas ===
- Carmen by Georges Bizet, conductor Eugen Jochum, Bavarian Radio Chorus and Orchestra (1954, in German, highlights: Micaëla).
- Hänsel und Gretel by Engelbert Humperdinck, conductor Herbert von Karajan, EMI 5670612 2CD-Album (1953)
- Hänsel und Gretel by Engelbert Humperdinck, conductor Otto Matzerath, live radio performance 1956, Ponto 2CD-Album (2004)
- Don Giovanni by Wolfgang Amadeus Mozart, conductor Wilhelm Furtwängler, EMI 7638602 3CD-Album (live recording 1954, tapes of the 1953 performance have also been issued).
- Don Giovanni by Wolfgang Amadeus Mozart, conductor Dimitri Mitropoulos, live recording 1956, Sony 3CD-Album (1994)
- Don Giovanni by Wolfgang Amadeus Mozart, conductor Wolfgang Sawallisch, live recording in German 1960, Deutsche Grammophon (Universal) 3CD-Album (2009)
- Don Giovanni by Wolfgang Amadeus Mozart, conductor Hans Zanotelli, highlights in German 1960, EMI CDZ 25 2217 2.
- Don Giovanni by Wolfgang Amadeus Mozart, conductor Ferenc Fricsay, live recording 1961, Golden Mel (2007)
- Die Hochzeit des Figaro by Wolfgang Amadeus Mozart, conductor Ferenc Fricsay, RELIEF B0001M64VQ 2CD-Album (1951)
- Idomeneo by Wolfgang Amadeus Mozart, conductor Ferenc Fricsay, live recording from Salzburg 1961, DG (1995)
- Le Nozze di Figaro by Wolfgang Amadeus Mozart, conductor Karl Böhm, live recording from Tokyo 1963, Ponto (2010)
- Die Zauberflöte by Wolfgang Amadeus Mozart, conductor Georg Solti, live radio performance 1955, GALA 2CD-Album (2004)
- Der Rosenkavalier by Richard Strauss (live recording Munich 1952: Octavian), conductor Erich Kleiber, MYTO CD-Album (2007)
- Der Rosenkavalier by Richard Strauss (live recording Berlin 1959: Marschallin), conductor Silvio Varviso, Gala CD-Album (2005)
- Der Rosenkavalier by Richard Strauss, conductor Wilhelm Schüchter,(Octavian, highlights) EMI 8264302 CD-Album (1956)
- Der Rosenkavalier by Richard Strauss (live recording Cologne 1972: Marschallin), conductor Siegfried Köhler, Opera Depot
- Pique Dame by Pyotr Ilyich Tchaikovsky (live radio performance Berlin 1947: Lisa), conductor Artur Rother, Gala CD-Album
- Lohengrin by Richard Wagner, conductor Rudolf Kempe, EMI 567415 3CD-Album (1963)
- Lohengrin by Richard Wagner, conductor Lovro von Matačić, live recording 1959, Orfeo (2006)
- Die Meistersinger von Nürnberg by Richard Wagner, conductor Rudolf Kempe, EMI 3CD-Album (1956)
- Die Meistersinger von Nürnberg by Richard Wagner, conductor André Cluytens, live recording 1957, Walhall (2008)
- Die Meistersinger von Nürnberg by Richard Wagner, conductor Erich Leinsdorf, live recording 1959, Myto (2010)
- Das Rheingold by Richard Wagner (live radio recording 1953: Freia) conductor Wilhelm Furtwängler, EMI (1990)
- Das Rheingold by Richard Wagner (live recording Bayreuth 1957 and 1958 : Freia) conductor Hans Knappertsbusch, various labels
- Götterdämmerung by Richard Wagner (live recording Bayreuth 1957 and 1958: Gutrune) conductor Hans Knappertsbusch, various labels
- Tannhäuser by Richard Wagner, conductor Franz Konwitschny, EMI 3CD-Album (1960)
- Der Freischütz by Carl Maria von Weber, conductor Wilhelm Furtwängler, live recording from Salzburg 1954, EMI 5674192 2CD-Album (2000)
- Der Freischütz by Carl Maria von Weber, conductor Joseph Keilberth, EMI 2CD-Album (1959)
- Der Freischütz by Carl Maria von Weber, conductor Erich Kleiber, live radio performance 1955, Opera D'oro 2CD-Album (1998)

=== Sacred music ===
- Matthäus-Passion BWV 244 by Johann Sebastian Bach, conductor Wilhelm Furtwängler, EMICLASSICS 5655092 2CD-Album (1995)
- Johannes-Passion BWV 245 by Johann Sebastian Bach, conductor Karl Forster, EMICLASSICS 7642342 2CDs-Album (1992)
- Kantaten - Cantatas by Johann Sebastian Bach, conductor Kurt Thomas, BERLINCLASSICS B000024WMM CD (1996)
- Bach MADE IN GERMANY Vol. II Kantaten, Motetten, Weihnachtsoratorium, conductor Kurt Thomas, BERLINCLASSICS B000031W6B 8CD-Album (1999)
- Die Schöpfung by Joseph Haydn, conductor Karl Forster, EMI 2 CD-Album (1989)
- Stabat mater by Gioacchino Rossini, conductor Ferenc Fricsay, Melodram (1994)
- Messa Da Requiem by Giuseppe Verdi, conductor Ferenc Fricsay, live recording 1951, Andromeda (2007)
- Ein Deutsches Requiem Op. 45, by Johannes Brahms, conductor Rudolf Kempe, EMICLASSICS 7647052 (1955)
- Ein Deutsches Requiem Op. 45, by Johannes Brahms, conductor Otto Klemperer, 1956 radio performance, ICA CLASSICS 5002 (2011)

=== Lieder ===
- Elisabeth Grümmer, Lieder by Schubert, Brahms, Grieg und Verdi, conductor Hugo Diez and Richard Kraus, TESTAMENT B000003XJQ (1996)
- Elisabeth Grümmer, Liederabend, Lieder by Mendelssohn, Schumann, Schoeck, Wolf, ORFEO 506001B CD (2000)
- Recital 1970, Lieder by Beethoven, Brahms, Mozart, Reger, Schubert, Schumann, Strauss, Wolf, Dirigent Richard Kraus, GALA B000028CLY 2CD-Album (2001)
- Elisabeth Grümmer sings Mozart, Schubert, Brahms, Wolf , Historic recordings 1956/1958. Hänssler Classics (2009)

=== Video ===
- Don Giovanni by Wolfgang Amadeus Mozart, conductor Wilhelm Furtwängler, film directed by Paul Czinner, Deutsche Grammophon 073 019-9 DVD-Video (2001)
- Don Giovanni by Mozart, sung in German translation, conductor Ferenc Fricsay, Deutsche Oper Berlin 24 September 1961, with Dietrich Fischer-Dieskau, Josef Greindl, Legato Classics LCV 022

== Bibliography ==
- The Last Prima Donnas, by Lanfranco Rasponi, Alfred A Knopf, 1982. ISBN 0-394-52153-6
