= André Diot =

French cinematographer (born 1935)

- Born: 1935 (age 89–90)
- Occupations: cinematographer; lighting designer

André Diot (born 1935) is a French cinematographer and lighting designer. During his career, he designed the lighting for the 1976 Bayreuth Jahrhundertring, staged by Patrice Chéreau, the opening and closing ceremony of the 1992 Winter Olympics in Albertville, and in 2013 Così fan tutte at the Paris Opera.

== Career ==
While a director of photography in television, Diot was introduced by Bernard Sobel to Patrice Chéreau, with whom he subsequently worked extensively. Their first joint creation was in 1967, for Les Soldats by Jakob Michael Reinhold Lenz. Diot then introduced Hydrargyrum medium-arc iodide lamp (HMI) theater projectors, usually reserved for the cinema or sports events. Until the mid-1980s, he used techniques such as black-and-white, backlighting and shadows to create an onstage environment of chiaroscuro, or of twilight, a poetic atmosphere that eventually became their joint trademark: Diot-Chéreau.

They worked together in Chéreau's first theatre, the Théâtre de Sartrouville, from 1966, in a team with together with stage designer Richard Peduzzi and costume designer Jacques Schmidt.

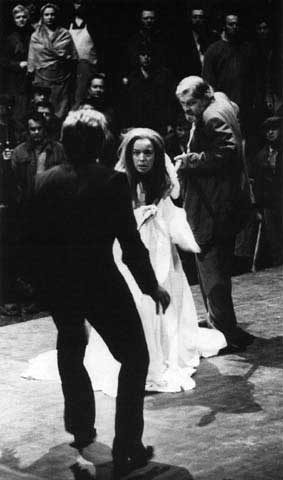
Götterdämmerung, part of the Ring Cycle, in the centenary production at the Bayreuth Festival, conducted by Pierre Boulez and staged by Patrice Chéreau, with Gwyneth Jones as Brünnhilde

As part of this team, he designed the lighting for the Jahrhundertring (Centenary Ring), the production of Richard Wagner's Ring Cycle, Der Ring des Nibelungen, at the Bayreuth Festival celebrating the centenary of the festival and the cycle. In 1992, he designed the lighting for Philippe Découflé at the opening and closing ceremony of the 1992 Winter Olympics in Albertville.

He has collaborated with other directors, including Philippe Avron, Jean Jourdheuil, Roger Planchon, Jean-Pierre Vincent and Jacques Weber. He designed the lighting for Peter Zadek's 1988 staging of Shakespeare's Der Kaufmann von Venedig at the Burgtheater, which took the action to a Wall Street background. The artist's conversations with Zadek are part of a 2012 book Peter Zadek und seine Bühnenbildner (Peter Zadek and his stage directors), edited by Elisabeth Plessen. In 2011, he designed the lighting for Janáček's Katya Kabanova at the Vienna State Opera, staged by André Engel. In 2013, he designed the lighting for Mozart's Così fan tutte at the Paris Opera, staged by Ezio Toffolutti and conducted by Michael Schønwandt.

== Awards ==
Diot received the Molière Award in the category Best Lighting Design, in 2001 for Brecht's Le Cercle de craie caucasien, in 2004 for L'Hiver sous la table, directed by Zabou Breitman at the Théâtre de l'Atelier, in 2005 for Ödön von Horváth's Le Jugement dernier, and in 2006 for Shakespeare's Le Roi Lear, directed by André Engel. He was nominated in 2007 for Blanc by Emmanuelle Marie, staged again by Breitman.

== Filmography ==
=== Selected theatre productions ===
- 1967: Les Soldats by Jakob Lenz, staged by Patrice Chéreau
- 1973: La Dispute by Marivaux, staged by Chéreau
- 1979: No Man's Land by Harold Pinter, staged by Roger Planchon at the Théâtre national populaire at Villeurbanne (French premiere)
- 1986: Elvire Jouvet 40, written and staged by Brigitte Jaques
- 1998:
  - Le Mari, la Femme et l'Amant de Sacha Guitry, staged by Bernard Murat at the Théâtre des Variétés.
  - Les Poubelles Boys et l'École des Maris, staged by Benno Besson
- 2001: Le cercle de craie caucasien by Bertolt Brecht, staged by Besson
- 2002: Jeux de scène by Victor Haïm, staged by Marcel Bluwal at the Théâtre de l'Œuvre (Premiere)
- 2004: L'Hiver sous la table by Roland Topor, staged by Zabou Breitman at the Théâtre de l'Atelier
- 2005: Célébration by Pinter, staged by Planchon at the Théâtre du Rond-Point
- 2006: Le Roi Lear by Shakespeare, staged by Engel
- 2009: Minetti (de) de Thomas Bernhard, staged by Engel at the Théâtre de la Colline
- 2010: La Tragédie du roi Richard II by Shakespeare, staged by Jean-Baptiste Sastre at the Festival d'Avignon

=== Selected film productions ===
- 1973: L'École des femmes, telefilm by Raymond Rouleau
- 1975: Lily aime-moi by Maurice Dugowson
- 1976:
  - F... comme Fairbanks by Dugowson
  - Le Jeu du solitaire by Jean-François Adam
- 1985: Bras de fer by Gérard Vergez
- 1986:
  - Le Paltoquet by Michel Deville
  - Le Passage (fr) by René Manzor
- 1987: Deux minutes de soleil en plus by Vergez
- 1989: La Folle Journée ou Le Mariage de Figaro de Roger Coggio
- 1997: La Divine Poursuite by Deville
- 1999: La Maladie de Sachs (fr) by Deville
