= Robert Schunk =

German operatic tenor (born 1948)

- Born: 5 January 1948; Neu-Isenburg, Hesse, Germany
- Education: Musikhochschule Frankfurt
- Occupation: Operatic tenor
- Organizations: Badisches Staatstheater Karlsruhe; Theater Bonn; Opernhaus Dortmund

Robert Schunk (born 5 January 1948) is a German operatic tenor who appeared in leading roles such as Florestan in Fidelio, Siegmund in Wagner's Die Walküre and the Emperor in Die Frau ohne Schatten by Richard Strauss, at international opera houses and festivals.

== Life and career ==
Born in Neu-Isenburg, Schunk studied at the Musikhochschule Frankfurt with Martin Gründler from 1966 to 1973. From 1973 to 1975 he was a member of the ensemble of the Badisches Staatstheater Karlsruhe, where he made his debut as Jack in Tippett's The Midsummer Marriage.

From 1975 he was engaged at the Theater Bonn. He moved on to the ensemble of the Opernhaus Dortmund in 1977. In 1977, Schunk made his debut at the Bayreuth Festival, first in smaller roles, such as Walther von der Vogelweide in Tannhäuser, Melot and the young sailor in Tristan und Isolde, a Grail Knight in Parsifal and Erik in Der fliegende Holländer. He successfully stepped in for Peter Hofmann as Siegmund in Die Walküre.

From 1979 onwards, he worked as a freelance singer, performing internationally. He appeared at both the Hamburg State Opera and the Vienna State Opera in 1981 as the Emperor in Die Frau ohne Schatten by Richard Strauss. In 1983, he appeared as Max in Weber's Der Freischütz at the Bregenz Festival. The same year, he made his U.S. debut as Erik at the Lyric Opera of Chicago. In 1984 he took part in the Hamburg State Opera's tour of Japan. In 1986 he appeared as Florestan in Beethoven's Fidelio at the Metropolitan Opera, opposite Hildegard Behrens in the title role, returning in 1989 as Siegmund and in 1990 as the Emperor, a role which he had also performed for his 1987 debut at the Royal Opera House. In 1996, he appeared as Loge in Wagner's Das Rheingold at the Opéra de Marseille. In addition to his opera activities, Schunk has also performed successfully in concerts. He recorded the tenor solo in Beethoven's Ninth Symphony in 1986, conducted by Georg Solti with the Chicago Symphony Orchestra & Chorus, alongside Jessye Norman, Reinhild Runkel and Hans Sotin.

From 2001 until his retirement in 2013, Schunk was professor of voice at Aachen location of the Musikhochschule Köln.
