= Donald McIntyre =

New Zealand opera singer (1934–2025)

Sir Donald McIntyre CBE
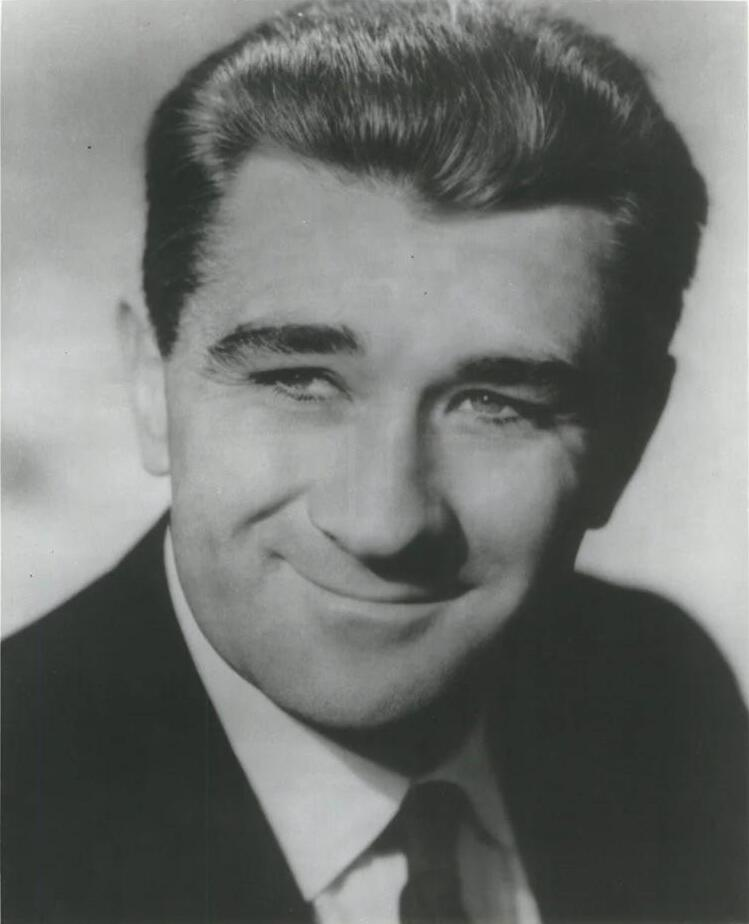
- McIntyre in 1974
- Born: Donald Conroy McIntyre; 22 October 1934; Auckland, New Zealand
- Died: 13 November 2025 (aged 91); Munich, Bavaria, Germany
- Education: Auckland College of Education; Guildhall School of Music
- Occupation: Operatic bass-baritone
- Organizations: Royal Opera House; Bayreuth Festival; Metropolitan Opera

Sir Donald Conroy McIntyre CBE (22 October 1934 – 13 November 2025) was a New Zealand operatic bass-baritone who made an international career, based at the Royal Opera House in London from 1967. He was a versatile singer but became best-known for portraying Wagner characters, especially Wotan in the Bayreuth Jahrhundertring in 1976.

== Life and career ==
=== Early life and education ===
Born in Auckland on 22 October 1934, McIntyre was the son of Hermyn and George McIntyre. His mother played violin, and he listened to music on radio and records. He was educated at Mount Albert Grammar School, and went on to study at Auckland Teachers' Training College to be a teacher. Simultaneously he took singing lessons with Hubert Milverton-Carva in Auckland. and began to perform in oratorios. At age 21, he first watched an opera performance and wanted to become an opera singer. His singing teacher got him a scholarship in England at the Guildhall School of Music in London; he studied with Ellis Keeler, and with Clemens Kaiser-Breme in Essen.

=== Opera career ===
McIntyre made his formal stage debut as Zaccaria in Verdi's Nabucco at the Welsh National Opera in 1959. He belonged to the ensemble of the Sadler's Wells Opera from 1960 to 1967, where he appeared in the title role of Verdi's Attila, as Kaspar in Weber's Der Freischütz and in bass roles of Mozart operas, sung in English. In 1964, he created the role of the Stranger in Menotti's Martin's Lie at the Bath International Music Festival. He joined the Royal Opera House in 1967, performing first as Pizarro in Beethoven's Fidelio. He took part in the world premiere of Bennett's Victory on 13 April 1970. He was successful as Jochanaan in Salome, Barak in Die Frau ohne Schatten, both by R. Strauss, as Scarpia in Puccini's Tosca, and in the title roles of Verdi's Rigoletto and Alban Berg's Wozzeck.

==== Bayreuth ====
Wolfgang Wagner watched McIntyre in London and engaged him for the Bayreuth Festival, where he first appeared in 1967, as Telramund in Lohengrin. He returned to the festival over twenty years, also in the title role of Der fliegende Holländer, as Klingsor and later Amfortas in Parsifal, as Kurwenal in Tristan und Isolde and as Wotan/Wanderer in Der Ring des Nibelungen. A major accomplishment was his Wotan/Wanderer at Bayreuth in the Jahrhundertring (Centenary Ring) in 1976, celebrating the centenary of both the festival and the first performance of the complete cycle, conducted by Pierre Boulez and staged by Patrice Chéreau, recorded and filmed in 1979 and 1980. He portrayed the character with "vocal greatness from the warm-hearted father to the heroic-ruler failure, always paired with the usual outstanding stage appearance".

==== International ====
When Pierre Boulez conducted a recording of Debussy's Pelléas et Mélisande in 1969/70, he engaged McIntyre among world stars for the dark role of Golaud. He first appeared at the Metropolitan Opera in New York City in 1975, as Wotan in Das Rheingold, and performed there until 1996, appearing as Pizarro in Fidelio, as Sarastro in Mozart's Die Zauberflöte and as Orest in Elektra by R. Strauss. He performed in the opening performance of the restored Zürich Opernhaus in 1984 as Hans Sachs in Wagner's Die Meistersinger von Nürnberg, a role that he repeated successfully at the Wellington Opera House. He appeared in 1989 at the Royal Opera House in Berio's Un re in ascolto, repeated in 1991 at the Opéra Bastille. He performed as Telramund at the Teatro San Carlos in Lisbon in 1991, and as Moses in Schoenberg's Moses und Aron in London in 1992, as Sachs at the Metropolitan Opera in 1992, as Gurnemanz in Parsifal at the Antwerp Opera in 1996, and as Trulove in Stravinsky's The Rake's Progress at the Théâtre du Châtelet. He performed at La Scala in Milan as the Old Servant in Elektra in 2014, making the scene of recognising Orest a stunning moment.

=== Personal life and death ===
In 1961, McIntyre married Jill Redington; the couple had three children. The marriage ended in divorce. In 2014, he married Bettina Jablonski.

McIntyre died in Munich on 13 November 2025, at the age of 91.

== Honours and awards ==
McIntyre was appointed an Officer of the Order of the British Empire in the 1977 New Year Honours, for services to opera. In the 1985 Queen's Birthday Honours, he was promoted to Commander of the order. In 1990, McIntyre received the New Zealand 1990 Commemoration Medal. He was appointed a Knight Bachelor, for services to opera, in the 1992 Queen's Birthday Honours. Also in 1992, McIntyre was awarded an honorary Doctor of Music degree by the University of Auckland.

He won a Grammy Award in 1982 for recording the role of Wotan/Wanderer, in the category Best opera recording. In 1989, he was awarded the Fidelio Medal.

In 2004, McIntyre received an Icon Award from the Arts Foundation of New Zealand, an honour limited to 20 living New Zealanders.

== Recordings ==
His discography includes Golaud in Debussy's Pelléas et Mélisande, alongside George Shirley and Elisabeth Söderström, conducted by Pierre Boulez, recorded in 1969. He recorded Klingsor in Wagner's Parsifal, with Gwyneth Jones as Kundry, in 1970. He recorded Telramund in Lohengrin, conducted by Rudolf Kempe, took part in Stravinsky's Oedipus rex, conducted by Georg Solti, with Peter Pears in the title role, in 1976, and performed as Gurnemanz in Parsifal, conducted by Reginald Goodall, in a 1984 recording. He also recorded oratorios by Handel, Messiah and Saul.

Also on DVD are his performances of the title role of Der fliegende Holländer, conducted by Wolfgang Sawallisch in 1974, Orest in Elektra, alongside Birgit Nilsson in the title role, conducted by James Levine and directed by Herbert Graf in 1980, Wagner's Die Meistersinger von Nürnberg, conducted by Charles Mackerras in 1988, Arabella by R. Strauss, alongside Kiri Te Kanawa in the title role, in 1994, as well as another Elektra, conducted by Levine the same year.
