= George Shirley =

American opera singer

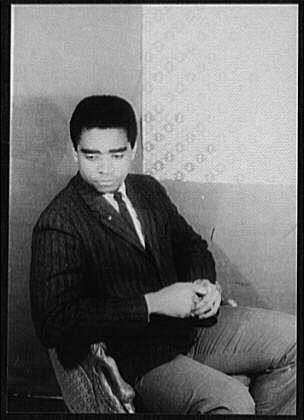
George Shirley, 1961

George Irving Shirley (born April 18, 1934) is an American operatic tenor, and was the first African-American tenor to perform a leading role at the Metropolitan Opera in New York City.

== Early life ==
Shirley was born in Indianapolis, Indiana, and raised in Detroit, Michigan. He earned a bachelor's degree in music education from Wayne State University in 1955 and then was drafted into the Army, where he became the first Black member of the United States Army Chorus. He was also the first African American hired to teach music in Detroit high schools.

== Career ==
After continuing voice studies with Therny Georgi, he moved to New York and began his professional career as a singer. His debut was with a small opera group in Woodstock as Eisenstein in Strauss's Die Fledermaus in 1959, and his European debut in Italy as Rodolfo in Puccini's La bohème. In 1960, at 26, he won a National Arts Club scholarship competition, and the following April he was the first Black singer to win the Metropolitan Opera National Council Auditions scholarship competition. Shirley is the first Black tenor and the second Black male to sing leading roles for the Metropolitan Opera. He sang there for 11 seasons.

Shirley has also appeared at The Royal Opera, London; the Deutsche Oper Berlin; the Teatro Colón in Buenos Aires; the Dutch National Opera in Amsterdam; Opéra de Monte-Carlo; the New York City Opera; the Scottish Opera; the Lyric Opera of Chicago; the Washington National Opera; the Michigan Opera Theatre; the San Francisco Opera; and the Santa Fe Opera and Glyndebourne Festival summer seasons, as well as with numerous orchestras in the United States and Europe. He has sung more than 80 roles.

He was on the faculty of the University of Maryland from 1980 to 1987, when he moved to the University of Michigan School of Music, Theatre & Dance, where he was Director of the Vocal Arts Division. He currently serves as the Joseph Edgar Maddy Distinguished University Professor of Music, and still maintains a studio at the school.

== Awards and recognition ==
In 1968, Shirley won a Grammy Award for his performance in the role Ferrando in the RCA recording of Mozart's Così fan tutte. He has three times been a master teacher in the National Association of Teachers of Singing Intern Program for Young NATS Teachers, and taught dozens of up-and-coming vocalists for ten years at the Aspen Music Festival and School. Shirley produced a series of programs for WQXR-FM radio in New York on Classical Music and the Afro-American and hosted a four-program series on WETA-FM radio in Washington, D.C. called Unheard, Unsung. Shirley has been awarded honorary degrees by Wilberforce University, Montclair State College, Lake Forest College, and the University of Northern Iowa. He is a National Patron of Delta Omicron, an international professional music fraternity. In 2013, Phi Mu Alpha Sinfonia, of which he is a member, named him a Signature Sinfonian, an award recognizing exceptional accomplishment in the fraternity member's chosen field. One his highest honors came in 2015 when Mr. Shirley received the National Medal of Arts, bestowed upon him by US President Barack Obama. The following year in 2016, he was a recipient of the Lifetime Achievement Award during the National Opera Association's annual convention. Shirley was presented with the William Warfield Legacy Award in 2019 for his dedication to the advancement of African American classical vocalists and the legacy of William Warfield.

== Discography ==
[Composer: work (other singers; ensembles; conductor), label, recording or publication date.]

- [various]: George Shirley Vol. 1 (various), Hamburger Archiv für Gesangskunst, various recording dates
- [various]: George Shirley Vol. 2 (various), Hamburger Archiv für Gesangskunst, various recording dates
- Cherubini: Mass in D minor (Patricia Wells, Maureen Forrester, Justino Díaz; chorus and orchestra of the Clarion Concerts; Newell Jenkins), Vanguard, 1971
- Debussy: Pélléas et Mélisande (Elisabeth Söderström, Yvonne Minton, Donald McIntyre, David Ward; chorus and orchestra of the Royal Opera House, Covent Garden; Pierre Boulez), Columbia Records (CBS), December 1969 and January 1970
- Handel: Ode for St. Cecilia's Day (Gwendolyn Bradley; Boys Choir of Harlem, Orchestra of St. Luke's; Walter Turnbull), 127th Street Records, June 1986
- Haydn: Orlando paladino (Arleen Auger, Elly Ameling, Gwendolyn Killebrew, Claes Ahnsjö, Benjamin Luxon, Domenico Trimarchi; Orchestre de Chambre de Lausanne; Antal Doráti), Philips Records, June 1976
- Mozart: Così fan tutte (Leontyne Price, Tatiana Troyanos, Judith Raskin, Sherrill Milnes, Ezio Flagello; Ambrosian Opera Chorus; New Philharmonia Orchestra; Erich Leinsdorf) RCA, 1967
- Mozart: Idomeneo (Margherita Rinaldii, Pauline Tinsley, Ryland Davies, Robert Tear; BBC Symphony Orchestra and Chorus; Colin Davis) Philips, 1968
- Mozart: Requiem (Edith Mathis, Grace Bumbry, Marius Rintzler; New Philharmonia Orchestra and Chorus; Rafael Frühbeck de Burgos) HMV & other labels, (P) 1968
- Puccini: Manon Lescaut (Renata Tebaldi, John Reardon, Raymond Michalski; chorus and orchestra of the Metropolitan Opera; Francesco Molinari-Pradelli, Hamburger Archiv für Gesangskunst, 1967
- Rachmaninov: The Bells (Phyllis Curtin, Michael Devlin; Temple University Concert Choir; Philadelphia Orchestra; Eugene Ormandy) RCA, March 24, 1973
- R. Strauss: Friedenstag (Alessandra Marc, Roger Roloff, William Wilderman; New York City Gay Men's Chorus; Collegiate Chorale and Orchestra; Robert Bass) Koch, live, Carnegie Hall, November 19, 1989
- Stravinsky: Oedipus rex (Shirley Verrett, Loren Driscoll, Donald Gramm, John Reardon, Chester Watson; John Westbrook, narrator; chorus and orchestra of the Washington Opera Society; Igor Stravinsky), Columbia Records (CBS), January 20, 1961
- Stravinsky: Pulcinella (Irene Jordan, Donald Gramm; Columbia Symphony Orchestra; Igor Stravinsky), Columbia Records (CBS), August 23, 1965
- Stravinsky: Renard (Loren Driscoll, Donald Gramm, William Murphy; Columbia Chamber Ensemble, Igor Stravinsky) Columbia Records (CBS), January 26, 1962
