= Ortrun Wenkel =

German operatic contralto (1942–2025)

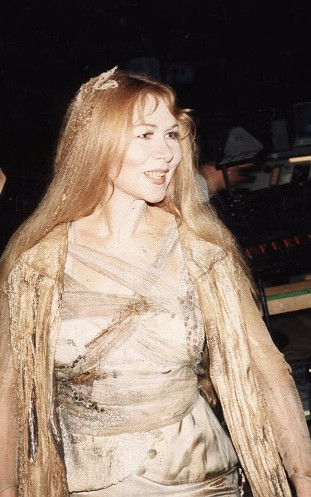
- Wenkel in 1993
- Born: 25 October 1937; Buttstädt, Gau Thuringia, Germany
- Died: 14 December 2025 (aged 88); Hirschberg, Baden-Württemberg, Germany
- Education: Hochschule für Musik Franz Liszt, Weimar; Musikhochschule Frankfurt
- Occupation: Operatic contralto

Ortrun Wenkel-Rothe (25 October 1937 (Note: Some sources state 25 October 1942 as birth date.) – 14 December 2025) was a German operatic contralto. She notably portrayed the role of Erda in the Bayreuth Jahrhundertring (Centenary Ring) in 1976 and was awarded a Grammy Award as a principal soloist in 1983.

== Life and career ==
Wenkel was born in Buttstädt, Gau Thuringia, on 25 October 1937. She started her studies at the Hochschule für Musik Franz Liszt, Weimar. Following her emigration from East Germany to West Germany, she continued at the Frankfurt University of Music and Performing Arts with Paul Lohmann (masterclass) and then with Elsa Cavelti.

She began her career in 1964 as concert and oratorio soloist when she was still a student. Dedicated to Baroque music, she appeared at major international festivals including the English Bach Festival, Festival du Marais, Festival of Flanders, Holland Festival, and for concerts at the Salle Pleyel in Paris, the Royal Festival Hall in London, the Tonhalle in Zürich and the Vienna Musikvereinssaal. In 1971, she made her stage debut at the municipal theatre of Heidelberg in the title role of Glucks Orfeo. In 1975, she became a member of the Bavarian State Opera where she caught the attention of Wolfgang Wagner who immediately engaged her as Erda in the 1976 Bayreuth Festival's Jahrhundertring, celebrating the centenary of both the festival and the first performance of the complete Ring cycle, conducted by Pierre Boulez and staged by Patrice Chéreau, recorded and filmed in 1979 and 1980. For her performance of Erda in Das Rheingold and Siegfried and the First Norn in Götterdämmerung) in this production she was awarded in 1982 a Grammy as a "principal soloist".

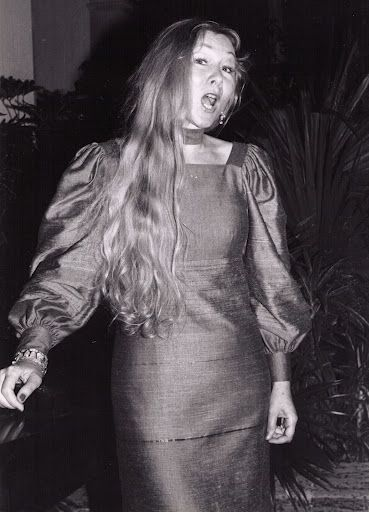
Wenkel in Miami

Wenkel appeared at many important opera houses of the world including Deutsche Oper Berlin, Palais Garnier in Paris, La Scala in Milan, the Royal Opera House in London, the Teatro Colón in Buenos Aires, as well as Rome, the opera houses of Stuttgart, Zurich, Geneva, Lisboa, Venice and Prague, among others, concert halls including the Berliner Philharmonie, Concertgebouw in Amsterdam, Accademia di Santa Cecilia in Rome, the Kennedy Center in Washington, D.C. and Carnegie Hall in New York. During the 1980s, she appeared repeatedly in Marcel Prawy's TV productions Gute Laune mit Musik and Ihre Melodie. Since her concert debut in 1964, Wenkel was continuously performing, and she worked with many of the most prominent conductors, e. g. Riccardo Chailly, Colin Davis, Christoph von Dohnányi, Christoph Eschenbach, Bernard Haitink, Marek Janowski, Erich Leinsdorf, Gerd Albrecht, Riccardo Muti, Václav Neumann, Seiji Ozawa, Giuseppe Sinopoli, Gabriel Chmura, Michael Hofstetter, Ulf Schirmer and Klaus Tennstedt. Her roles included Fricka and Waltraute in the Ring cycle at the Graz Opera, and Klytämnestra in Elektra by R. Strauss at the Budapest Spring Festival and at the Freiburg Opera, In the 2002/03 season she portrayed the title role in Aribert Reimann's Bernarda Albas Haus in the opera's Swiss premiere at the Bern Theatre, and in 2012 Filipjewna in Tchaikovsky's Eugene Onegin) at the Staatstheater Saarbrücken. In contemporary music, she collaborated with composers Hans Werner Henze, Krzysztof Penderecki and Reimann. Henze composed for her his revision of Wagner's Wesendonck Lieder for alto and chamber orchestra, and she performed the premiere under his direction at the Westdeutscher Rundfunk in 1977. In 1999 she portrayed Magda Schneider in the premiere of Tod und Teufel by Gerd Kühr and Peter Turrini during the Steirischer Herbst in Graz. Wenkel is also renowned for giving recitals around the world, accompanied by pianists including Geoffrey Parsons, Rudolf Jansen, Phillip Moll, Erik Werba, Wilhelm von Grunelius, Cord Garben, Helge Dorsch, Burkhard Schaeffer and Felix-Jany Renz.

Wenkel died in December 2025 after a short illness in Hirschberg-Leutershausen at the age of 88.

== Reviews ==
- On 19 April 1971, The Daily Telegraph London wrote about Wenkel's concert at the English Bach Festival: "Each of the soloists sang with some command here but outstanding was the splendid young contralto Ortrun Wenkel, who produced the liveliest and most committed solo of the evening."
- In September 1981, Speight Jenkins wrote in Record World, New York, about the recording of Das Rheingold with Wenkel (Erda), Siegmund Nimsgern (Alberich), Theo Adam (Wotan), Peter Schreier (Loge), Lucia Popp (Woglinde), Yvonne Minton (Fricka) and the Staatskapelle Dresden conducted by Marek Janowski, recorded 1980 in Dresden: "Of the singers the best by far is Ortrun Wenkel, the Erda. She levels her competition on all the other sets. This is a great Erda, a true contralto Mother Earth who inspires terror and commands with authority."
- On 16 October 1984, Donal Henahan wrote in The New York Times about the performance of Glinka's Ivan Susanin in Carnegie Hall, with Wenkel (Vanya), Martti Talvela (Susanin) and Chris Merritt (Sobinin): "... Miss Wenkel, a spunky mezzo with a particularly solid lower register. Easily the most spirited and imaginative actor in the cast, she almost managed to make one take an interest in the intrepid Vanya, Susanin's adopted son."
- On 14 March 1986, Pierre Petit from Le Figaro wrote about the performance of Mahler's Kindertotenlieder with the Orchestre de Paris, conducted by Erich Leinsdorf. "It was Ortrun Wenkel who sang these five great and beautiful songs. A voice of remarkable harmony over a range of two octaves, of warm and dark colour, keeping the same virtues all over in addition to a quite natural sense of phrasing serving the line of the melody without ever damaging her luminous pronunciation."
- In May 1986, Bill Zakariasen wrote in the Daily News, New York, about Daphne at the Richard Strauss Festival at Carnegie Hall with Catherine Malfitano (Daphne) and Wenkel (Gaea): "Ortrun Wenkel's super-contralto voice was an ideal fit for the earth-goddess Gaea – probably the lowest female role in opera."

== Selected recordings ==
- Vivaldi: Psaume 126 "Nisi Dominus", Carissimi: Canzone "No, non si speri", Caldara: Air de Cantate "Mirti, faggi, tronchi", Monteverdi: Lamento d'Arianna; Ortrun Wenkel, Orchestra PRO ARTE München, Conductor: Kurt Redel (LP 1975, Arion, Paris 1976/1979)
- Bach: St Matthew Passion, Evangelische Jugendkantorei der Pfalz, Chamber Orchestra of Heidelberg, cond: Heinz Markus Goettsche (1976 LP Da Camera Magna, 1997 CD Bayer Records)
- Mahler: Symphony No. 3; London Philharmonic Orchestra, cond.: Klaus Tennstedt (EMI Records 1980)
- Wagner: Der Ring des Nibelungen; cond.: Pierre Boulez (1980 LP Philips/ 2005 DVD Deutsche Grammophon)
- Penderecki: Te Deum; NDR Chor, RIAS Kammerchor, Radio-Symphonie-Orchester Berlin, Conductor: Krzysztof Penderecki (1981, Sender Freies Berlin, LP)
- Dvořák: Stabat Mater; Czech Philharmonic Choir, Czech Philharmonic, cond.: Wolfgang Sawallisch (1983, Supraphon)
- Shostakovich: Symphony Nr. 14 / Six Poems by Marina Tsvetaeva, Op. 143a; Júlia Várady, Dietrich Fischer-Dieskau / Wenkel, Concertgebouw Orchestra, cond.: Bernard Haitink (1986, Decca)
- Schreker: Five songs for low voice; Radio-Symphonie-Orchester Berlin, cond.: Karl Anton Rickenbacher (1986, Koch Records)
- Mozart: Requiem; Concentus Musicus Wien, cond.: Nikolaus Harnoncourt (1991, Teldec; DVD 2006, TDK, including Bach: Komm, du süße Todesstunde, BWV 161)
- Mahler: Symphony Nr. 8; Frankfurter Museumsorchester, cond.: Michael Gielen (LP 1981 / CD 1992 Sony)
- Bach: Cantatas Lobe den Herren, den mächtigen König der Ehren, BWV 137 and Ich hatte viel Bekümmernis, BWV 21; Thomanerchor and Neues Bachisches Kollegium Leipzig, cond: Hans-Joachim Rotzsch (1994, Berlin Classics)
- Wagner: Der Ring des Nibelungen; Dresdner Staatskapelle, Conductor: Marek Janowski (1982 LP, Eterna / 1983 LP Ariola-Eurodisc / 1995 CD, RCA)
- Strauss: Daphne; Lucia Popp, Reiner Goldberg, Peter Schreier, Wenkel, Kurt Moll; Choir and Symphony Orchestra of Bayerischer Rundfunk, cond.: Haitink (2011 CD EMI Classics)
