= Jeannine Altmeyer =

American soprano

Jeannine Altmeyer (2 May 1948, Pasadena, California) is an American soprano who had a prolific international opera career during the 1970s through the 1990s. Particularly admired for her portrayal of Wagner and Strauss heroines, she notably sang Brünnhilde under Marek Janowski on the 1982 recording of The Ring Cycle which won a Grammy Award for Best Opera Recording.

== Biography ==
Altmeyer studied with Martial Singher and Lotte Lehmann at the Music Academy of the West in Montecito. In Europe she studied with George London and again with Lehman. After winning the Metropolitan Opera National Council Auditions in 1970 and the Illinois Opera Guild Auditions in 1971, she made her début at the Metropolitan Opera as the Heavenly Voice in Verdi's Don Carlos on 25 September 1971. She sang Freia at the Lyric Opera of Chicago (1972), Salzburg Easter Festival (1973) and Covent Garden (1975). After several seasons at Stuttgart (1975–1979) she appeared as Sieglinde and Gutrune in Patrice Chéreau's centenary production of the Ring cycle (Jahrhundertring, 1979) at the Bayreuth Festival, where she also sang Isolde (1986). Apart from her Wagnerian roles (which also include Elsa, Eva, Elisabeth, Gutrune and Brünnhilde), Altmeyer sang Agathe (Der Freischütz), Strauss's Ariadne, Salome and Chrysothemis, Lisa (The Queen of Spades) and Leonore (Fidelio), which she sang at La Scala in 1990.

== Sources ==
- Eriksson, Erik, Biography: Jeannine Altmeyer, All Music Guide. Accessed 7 October 2009.
- Metropolitan Opera Performance record: Altmeyer, Jeannine (Soprano), MetOpera Database. Accessed 7 October 2009.
