= The English Cat =

1983 opera by Hans Werner Henze

The English Cat Die englische Katze
- Opera by Hans Werner Henze
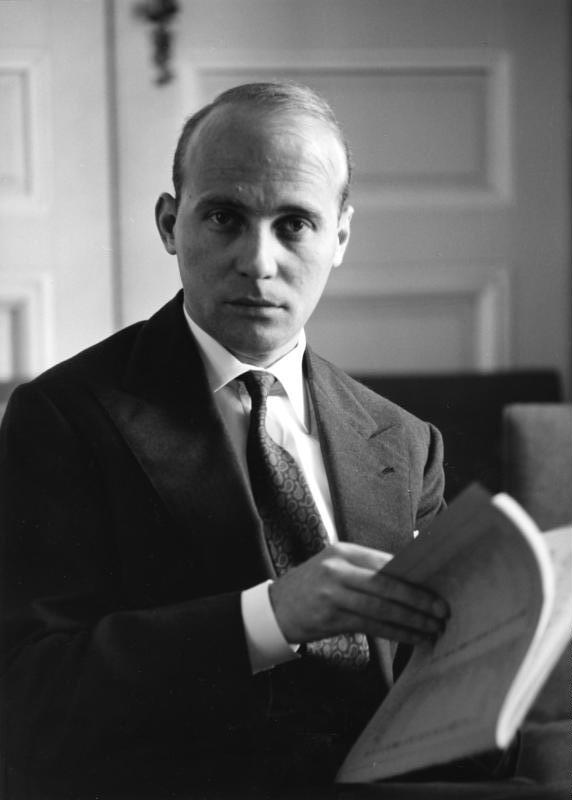
- The composer in 1960
- Librettist: Edward Bond
- Based on: Les peines de coeur d'une chatte anglaise by Honoré de Balzac
- Premiere: 2 June 1983; Schwetzingen Festival

The English Cat (in German, Die englische Katze) is an opera in two acts by Hans Werner Henze to an English libretto by Edward Bond, based on Les peines de coeur d'une chatte anglaise (The heartbreak of an English cat) by Honoré de Balzac. The opera was first performed in a German translation by the Stuttgart Opera at the Schlosstheater Schwetzingen at the Schwetzingen Festival on 2 June 1983. The French premiere was at the Opéra-Comique, Paris in 1984. The first performance using the original English text was at Santa Fe on 13 July 1985. The UK premiere was at the Leith Theatre, Edinburgh, on 19 August 1987. A revised version was performed at Montepulciano in 1990 and this was given in London in 1991.

== Roles ==
Role	Voice type	Premiere Cast, 2 June 1983 (Conductor: Dennis Russell Davies)
Lord Puff	tenor	Martin Finke
Minette, Lord Puff's wife	soprano	Inga Nielsen
Tom, Minette's lover	baritone	Wolfgang Schöne
Arnold	bass	Roland Bracht
Babette, Minette's sister	mezzo-soprano	Elisabeth Glauser
Louise	soprano	Regina Marheineke
Miss Crisp	soprano	Melinda Liebermann
Lady Toodle	mezzo-soprano	Ursula Sutter
Peter	tenor	Helmut Holzapfel
Plunkett	bass	Arend Baumann
Jones	baritone	Karl-Friedrich Dürr

== Synopsis ==
The opera is set in London in the 1890s.

A group of bourgeois cats has formed the Royal Society for the Protection of Rats. Avowed pacifists as well, the society has been raising a young orphan mouse, Louise. There is a love triangle between Lord Puff, his wife Minette, and Tom.

== Instrumentation ==
- Woodwind: 2 flutes, (both also treble recorders and piccolos), 2 oboes (both also English horn, 2nd doubling on Heckelphone), 2 clarinets (1st doubling on E flat clarinet, 2nd on bass clarinet and contrabass clarinet), 2 bassoons (2nd doubling on double bassoon)
- Brass: 2 horns, 1 trumpet, 1 trombone
- Percussion (3 players): 2 glass bars, 9 Chinese gongs, suspended cymbals, African wood drum, 8 log drums, tumba, maracas, claves, güiro, 2 sistrums, wood block, cabaça, 5 temple blocks, switches, American slat clacks, bass metallophone (or bass xylophone), 9 finger cymbals, slide whistle, 14 small bells
- harp, piano (also 4 hands), celesta, small organ, zither, strings (6.4.3.3.1)

== Recording ==
- Wergo WER 62042: Richard Berkeley-Steele (Lord Puff), Mark Coles (Arnold), Louisa Kennedy (Minett), Gunvor Nilsson (Babette/Der Mond), Ian Platt (Tom); Parnassus Orchestra London; Markus Stenz, conductor
