= Elisabeth Glauser =

Swiss opera singer (born 1943)

- Born: 1 June 1943 (age 83); Interlaken, Switzerland
- Education: Bern Conservatory
- Occupation: Operatic mezzo-soprano
- Organizations: Stadttheater Pforzheim; Stadttheater Freiburg; Theater Dortmund; Staatsoper Stuttgart; Bern Conservatory

Elisabeth Glauser (born 1 June 1943) is a Swiss operatic mezzo-soprano and an academic teacher of voice. She was engaged at opera houses in Germany and has appeared at international festivals including the Bayreuth Festival and the Glyndebourne Festival. She has focused on roles by Richard Strauss and Richard Wagner, and has created roles in contemporary opera, such as Babette in Henze's Die englische Katze.

== Career ==
Born in Interlaken, Glauser studied at the Bern Conservatory with Felix Loeffel, and continued her studies in Stockholm with Arne Sunnegårdh. She was a member of the Stadttheater Pforzheim from 1971 and 1973, then at the Stadttheater Freiburg to 1975, at the Theater Dortmund to 1982, and at the Staatsoper Stuttgart to 1988. In Dortmund, she appeared in the title role of Antonio Bibalo's Fräulein Julie in 1975 in the first performance in German.

She appeared at the Bayreuth Festival as Rossweisse in the Jahrhundertring, staged by Patrice Chéreau and conducted by Pierre Boulez, from 1976 to 1980. In 1983, she created the role of Babette in Henze's Die englische Katze at the Schwetzingen Festival. She performed the role of Adelaide in Arabella by Richard Strauss at the 1985 Glyndebourne Festival. She appeared as Herodias in his Salome in 1988 in Rome, as Annina in his Der Rosenkavalier in 1989 in Nice, and as the Mother in Hänsel und Gretel in 1990 at the Opéra national du Rhin in Strasbourg.

Glauser has performed at the opera houses La Fenice, Teatro Comunale di Bologna, Komische Oper Berlin, Deutsche Oper am Rhein, Cologne Opera, Staatsoper Hannover, Opernhaus Zürich, Grand Théâtre de Genève, and Teatro San Carlos in Lisbon.

She has also sung in concert and oratorio. She was appointed professor of voice at the University of the Arts Bern from 1988. Among her students is Maria Riccarda Wesseling.

== Roles ==
Glauser's roles have included:

- Alban Berg, Lulu – Gräfin Geschwitz
- Benjamin Britten, The Rape of Lucretia – Lucretia
- Hans Werner Henze, Die englische Katze – Babette (premiere)
- Mozart, Le nozze di Figaro – Marcellina
- Strauss, Arabella – Adelaide
- Strauss, Elektra – Klytämnestra
- Strauss, Der Rosenkavalier – Annina, Octavian
- Strauss, Salome – Herodias
- Verdi, Falstaff – Mrs. Quickly
- Verdi, Rigoletto – Maddalena
- Verdi, Il trovatore – Azucena
- Wagner, Das Rheingold – Rossweisse, Fricka, Erda
- Wagner, Die Walküre – Fricka
- Wagner, Siegfried – Rossweisse, Erda
- Wagner, Götterdämmerung – Waltraute
- Wagner, Parsifal – Kundry

== Bibliography ==
- Bayreuth: "Elisabeth Glauser". Bayreuth Festival.
- Cummings, David Michael, ed. (2003). International Who's Who in Classical Music 2003. Vol. 19. London, New York: Taylor & Francis Group. p. 282. ISBN 1-85743-174-X.
- Kutsch, Karl-J.; Riemens, Leo (2003). "Glauser, Elisabeth". Großes Sängerlexikon (in German). Vol. 1 (4th ed.). Walter de Gruyter. p. 1752. ISBN 3-598-11598-9.
- Wesseling: "Maria Ricarda Wesseling". Kulturportal.
