= Martin Egel =

German bass-baritone (born 1944)

- Born: 17 January 1944 (age 81); Freiburg im Breisgau, Germany
- Occupations: Operatic bass-baritone; Speaker
- Organizations: Theater Basel; Bayreuth Festival
- Mother: Marga Höffgen

Martin Egel (born 17 January 1944) is a German bass-baritone in opera and concert, who made an international career. He appeared at the Bayreuth Festival from 1975 to 1986. He is also a speaker for television and recordings.

== Life ==
Egel was born in Freiburg im Breisgau as the son of the contralto singer Marga Höffgen and the choral conductor Theodor Egel. He studied voice in Frankfurt and Basel and made his stage debut at the Theater Basel in Mozart's Le nozze di Figaro in 1973, and remained a member of the ensemble to 1980.

At the Bayreuth Festival, Egel appeared from 1975 to 1986, including as Donner in the Jahrhundertring from 1977 to 1980. He was a guest at major opera houses in Germany and Europe. He appeared as Melot in Wagner's Tristan und Isolde at the Opera of Monte Carlo in 1983. The following year, he performed the title role of Mozart's Le nozze di Figaro at the Liceu in Barcelona. He appeared in Dallapiccola's Ulisse at the Teatro Regio in Turin in 1987. The following year as Music Master in Ariadne auf Naxos by Richard Strauss. In 1990, he performed the title role in Wagner's Der fliegende Holländer at the Staatstheater Mainz, and as Telramund in Wagner's Lohengrin at the Staatstheater Wiesbaden. He appeared as Wotan in Wagner's Das Rheingold at the Théâtre Graslin in Nantes in 1992. In 1996, he performed in Cimarosa's at Il mercato del Malmantile.

Egel appeared in a number of television productions as a speaker, and also took part in recordings of classical music. He also worked as a narrator of modern children's literature, such as for the record Onkel Martin singt und erzählt zur guten Nacht ("Uncle Martin sings and tells stories for a good night").
