= Ilse Gramatzki =

German opera singer (born 1939)

- Born: 1939 (age 85–86); Kiel, Germany
- Education: Musikhochschule Hamburg
- Occupations: Operatic mezzo-soprano and contralto
- Organizations: Cologne Opera; Frankfurt Opera; Bayreuth Festival

Ilse Gramatzki (born 1939) is a German operatic mezzo-soprano and contralto who performed at major European opera houses. A member of both the Cologne Opera and the Oper Frankfurt she is known for performing roles by Mozart, contemporary opera and roles by Wagner at the Bayreuth Festival including the Jahrhundertring.

== Career ==
Born in Kiel, Gramatzki studied voice in Hamburg, with the soprano Erna Schlüter, among others. In 1964 she was engaged at the Landestheater Detmold, from 1966 at the Staatstheater Braunschweig. She was a member of the Cologne Opera from 1968 to 1983, where she performed in Jean-Pierre Ponnelle's Mozart cycle. From 1974 to 2001, she was also a member of the Oper Frankfurt. She appeared there as Cornelia in Handel's Giulio Cesare, staged by Horst Zankl in 1977. She performed in 1983 the role of Charlotte in Zimmermann's Die Soldaten in a production conducted by Michael Gielen which was also shown at La Monnaie. In 1986 she participated in the premiere of Hans Zender's Stephen Climax at the Oper Frankfurt.

Gramatzki performed regularly at the Bayreuth Festival from 1972 to 1980, singing roles in the music dramas by Richard Wagner. In his Der Ring des Nibelungen, she appeared as two of the Rhinemaidens: as Floßhilde from 1972 to 1974, and as Wellgunde from 1976 to 1980 in the production Jahrhundertring staged by Patrice Chéreau and conducted by Pierre Boulez, also as the valkyrie Grimgerde in all almost all these seasons. She performed the role of Magdalene in Die Meistersinger von Nürnberg in 1976, and appeared in Parsifal as a Flowermaiden and as the First Esquire.

Gramatzki appeared at the Salzburg Festival of 1967 as Dritte Dame in Mozart's Die Zauberflöte. She performed the title role of Der Rosenkavalier by Richard Strauss at the Vienna State Opera in 1977. Roles at the festival Wiener Festwochen included in 1976 Annius in Mozart's La clemenza di Tito, and in 1986 Dorabella in Mozart's Così fan tutte in a production of La Monnaie directed by Luc Bondy.

Other major roles were Orfeo in Gluck's Orfeo ed Euridice, Cherubino in Mozart's Le nozze di Figaro, Hänsel in Humperdinck's Hänsel und Gretel, and the emperor in Henze's We Come to the River. She appeared at the opera houses of Rome and Amsterdam, and London's Royal Opera House.
