= Gabriele Schnaut =

German classical singer (1951–2023)

- Schnaut in c. 2000
- Born: 24 February 1951; Mannheim, Baden-Württemberg, West Germany
- Died: 19 June 2023 (aged 72)
- Education: Peter Cornelius Conservatory; University of Mainz; Frankfurt University of Music and Performing Arts
- Occupations: Classical singer (mezzo-soprano and dramatic soprano)
- Years active: 1976–2019
- Organizations: Bayreuth Festival; Hamburgische Staatsoper; Bayerische Staatsoper; Universität der Künste
- Title: Kammersängerin
- Awards: Bavarian Order of Merit

Gabriele Schnaut (24 February 1951 – 19 June 2023) was a German classical singer who started her operatic career as a mezzo-soprano in 1976 and changed to dramatic soprano in 1985. She performed at the Bayreuth Festival from 1977, in the filmed Jahrhundertring, to 2000. After a breakthrough performance as Wagner's Isolde at the Hamburgische Staatsoper in 1988, she became a leading dramatic soprano on the stages of the world in roles such as Wagner's Brünnhilde and Strauss' Elektra. From 2008, she ventured into dramatic mezzo-soprano character roles such as Klytämnestra in Elektra, Herodias in Salome and Kostelnicka Buryjovka in Janáček's Jenufa.

She performed and recorded works by composers of the 20th century and appeared in the world premieres of operas by Wolfgang Rihm and Jörg Widmann. She portrayed her roles with "dramatic conviction".

== Life and career ==
Gabriele Ruth Maria Schnaut was born in Mannheim on 24 February 1951, the daughter of a physician, Schnaut grew up in Mainz. She received violin and singing lessons as a child. She had also lessons in both ballet and expressionist dance, trained rowing for two years and took part in a theatre group. She studied first at the Peter Cornelius Conservatory of Mainz, majoring in violin, and at the same time musicology at the University of Mainz. At the conservatory, she had to take a second subject and chose voice because she wanted to avoid piano. Her teacher sent her to Musikhochschule Frankfurt, where she studied with Elsa Cavelti from 1971. Cavelti trained her as a contralto but predicted soon that she would be Sieglinde some day. Her studies were supported by a scholarship from the Studienstiftung des deutschen Volkes. She achieved, together with Uta-Maria Flake, a first prize at the 1975 Deutscher Musikwettbewerb in Bonn. She also studied with Aga Zah-Landzettel in Darmstadt. During her studies, she appeared as an alto soloist with the Gächinger Kantorei in Bach cantatas, conducted by Helmuth Rilling.

=== Mezzo-soprano ===
Schnaut's first permanent engagement was as a mezzo-soprano in 1976 at the Staatsoper Stuttgart. She had only small roles there, and was advised by Catarina Ligendza to move to a smaller house to gain experience with heavier roles. In 1978, made her debut at the Staatstheater Darmstadt as Hänsel in Humperdinck's Hänsel und Gretel, and became a member of the ensemble.

In 1977 Schnaut performed at the Bayreuth Festival for the first time, as Waltraute and the Second Norn in the Jahrhundertring staged by Patrice Chéreau and conducted by Pierre Boulez. She appeared in these roles in its filmed version Der Ring des Nibelungen. She performed at the festival in 1980 as Wellgunde in Götterdämmerung, and in 1985 as Venus in Tannhäuser and the Third Norn.

Schnaut was a member of the Nationaltheater Mannheim from 1980, where she performed the role of Ophelia in the premiere of Wolfgang Rihm's Die Hamletmaschine. She performed Marie in Alban Berg's Wozzeck in an authorised version, which was a step on her way into the soprano range.

=== Soprano ===
In private study with Hanne-Lore Kuhse in East Berlin, Schnaut developed to a dramatic soprano. She travelled once a month for several days of training. In 1985 she sang the title role of Wagner's Tristan und Isolde at the Theater Dortmund. She portrayed major roles at the Bayreuth Festival, in 1986 Sieglinde in Die Walküre, and in 1987 as Ortrud in Lohengrin. In 1988 she appeared as Isolde at the Hamburgische Staatsoper in the production by Ruth Berghaus which was her international breakthrough.

From 1986 to 1990 she was a member of the Deutsche Oper am Rhein, from 1995 a member of the Hamburgische Staatsoper, and then at the Bayerische Staatsoper. She made her debut in Munich in 1982 as Marie in Wozzeck. In 1992 she appeared on the occasion of the Summer Olympics in Barcelona, both as Venus in Wagner's Tannhäuser in a Hamburg production staged by Harry Kupfer, and in the role of Waldvogel in Arnold Schönberg's Gurre-Lieder. In 1994 she appeared at La Scala in the title role of Elektra by Richard Strauss and as Brünnhilde in Die Walküre. She made her debut at the Metropolitan Opera in New York City in 1996 as Brünnhilde. Reviewer Allan Kozinn from The New York Times wrote about her performance, with Plácido Domingo as Siegmund, Deborah Voigt as Sieglinde, Robert Hale as Wotan, and conducted by James Levine:

"Gabriele Schnaut, a German soprano making her Met debut as Brünnhilde, gave a performance that was not unblemished vocally, but her characterization was so finely detailed that one happily overlooked the few flaws. Ms. Schnaut's Brünnhilde undergoes a real transformation: she is unusually spirited in her second-act discussions with Wotan, thoroughly regal at the start of her encounter with Siegmund and disconsolate, but not entirely repentant, in the finale, when she is condemned to life as a mortal."

She performed as Kundry in Wagner's Parsifal at the Wiener Staatsoper from 1996. In Hamburg she sang both the Nurse and the Dyer's Wife in Die Frau ohne Schatten by Richard Strauss. In Munich, she appeared as Elektra in a production staged by Herbert Wernicke, identifying with the role. In 2000, she was Brünnhilde in Der Ring des Nibelungen at the Bayreuth Festival. She performed the title roles of Puccini's Tosca and Turandot, recorded on DVD at the Salzburg Festival in 2002.

In 1997, the magazine Die Deutsche Bühne named her "the only real dramatic singer-actor of our time ("die einzige, echte hochdramatische Sängerdarstellerin unserer Zeit"), for her "impressive stage presence, based on scenic detailed work and psychological insight in her characters".

=== Character roles ===
Schnaut changed to character roles in the mezzo-soprano range from 2008. In Munich she appeared as Emilia Marty in Janáček's Věc Makropulos and mezzo roles Klytämnestra in Elektra and Herodias in Salome. In 2006 she sang the premiere of Wolfgang Rihm's Das Gehege, a monodrama commissioned by the State Opera to be combined in a double bill with Salome, both directed by William Friedkin.

Schnaut appeared as Euphrat in the world premiere of Jörg Widmann's Babylon in October 2012, conducted by Kent Nagano. In 2013 she portrayed the desperate character of the sacristan Kostelnicka Buryjovka in Janáček's Jenufa like a heroine from ancient tragedy, but with tentative gestures of affection, as a review noted. She appeared at the Staatsoper Berlin, in the Schillertheater, in 2014 as Widow Begbick in Weill's Aufstieg und Fall der Stadt Mahagonny, and a reviewer noted that she "sang with relish and dramatic conviction and the rough quality of her aging voice was an excellent match for hard-edged sentimentality of Weill's music". In 2019 she portrayed Herodias at the Deutsche Oper Berlin as a distinctive character profile.

=== Teaching ===
Schnaut was a professor of voice at the Universität der Künste in Berlin between 2005 and 2014.

=== Personal life ===
The last residence of Schnaut and her husband Walter Knirim was Rottach-Egern.

Schnaut died on 19 June 2023, at age 72, after a short severe illness.

== Recordings ==
In the 1970s, Schnaut recorded with Helmuth Rilling and the Gächinger Kantorei sacred and secular cantatas by Johann Sebastian Bach and his St Matthew Passion, singing alto parts and one soprano part (in BWV 114). She appears as Waltraute and Second Norn in the film of the Jahrhundertring, filmed in 1980. In 1988 she recorded works by Paul Hindemith conducted by Gerd Albrecht, namely the role of Die Dame in Cardillac with Siegmund Nimsgern in the title role, and the role of the Woman in Mörder, Hoffnung der Frauen with Franz Grundheber as the Man. In 1989 she recorded Schreker's Der Schatzgräber, possibly the first recording of the opera, with Josef Protschka in the title role, again conducted by Albrecht.

Schnaut recorded Leonore in Beethoven's Fidelio with Christoph von Dohnányi (1990). A review devotes a paragraph to her performance, noting:

Her vocal acting is excellent: an example is her eruption after the on-stage plotting ... She starts with steady, controlled recitative before moving into her truly dramatic soprano with some fairly horrible leaps which she hits well. If there is a suggestion of a lack of vocal strength in her lower register and a slight diminishing of tonal beauty on high, it is more than made up for by her evenness of head to chest transfers, her assurance of vocal line and the believable drama with which she invests the role.

Schnaut recorded Brünnhilde in Die Walküre with Dohnányi and the Cleveland Orchestra for Decca. Alan Blyth wrote:

Bright and forceful in her war cry, she shows suitable concern at her father's distress, is wise and dignified in her colloquy with Siegmund, the phrase starting "So wenig achtest du" as inward as it should be. In Act 3 her appeal to Wotan "War es so schmählich?" is lovingly projected ... Even better is the phrase later in the scene, "zu lieben, was du geliebt", where Schnaut's basically bright tone takes on a softer timbre.

Schnaut appeared as Iocaste in Stravinsky's Oedipus Rex with Paavo Järvi, Ortrud in Lohengrin on a DVD of the Bayreuth Festival with Peter Schneider (1990) and Puccini's Turandot on a DVD of the Salzburg Festival with Valery Gergiev (2002).

== Awards ==
Schnaut was honoured with the title Kammersängerin in Hamburg in 1995. In 2003 she was appointed a Bavarian Kammersängerin by the Bavarian Minister of Culture Hans Zehetmair. She was also a recipient of the Bavarian Order of Merit.
