= Hermann Becht =

German opera singer

Hermann Becht (19 March 1939, Karlsruhe – 12 February 2009, Marxzell) was a German operatic bass-baritone. He notably portrayed the role of Alberich in the 1983 recording of Richard Wagner's The Ring Cycle which won a Grammy Award for Best Opera Recording. He also portrayed Alberich in the centennial Ring under conductor Pierre Boulez, directed by Patrice Chéreau in 1980.
