= Heinz Zednik =

Austrian opera singer

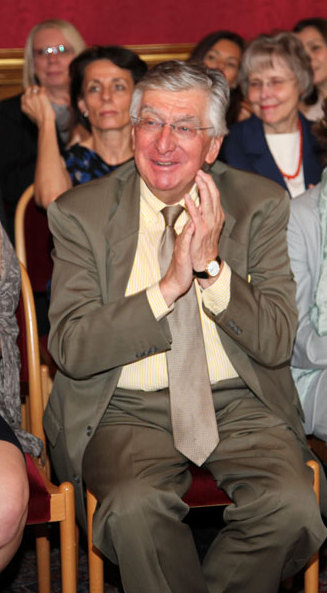
Heinz Zednik

Heinz Zednik (born 21 February 1940) is an Austrian operatic buffo tenor, closely associated with the character tenor roles of Wagner such as Mime and Loge (Der Ring des Nibelungen) and David (Die Meistersinger von Nürnberg). He is also distinguished in roles such as Valzacchi (Der Rosenkavalier), Monostatos (The Magic Flute), Pedrillo (Die Entführung aus dem Serail), the Scribe (Khovanshchina), the Captain in Wozzeck, and the Director (Luciano Berio's Un re in ascolto).

Zednik studied singing in Vienna before making his professional opera début in 1964 at Graz as Maestro Trabuco in La forza del destino. Shortly thereafter he was engaged by the Vienna State Opera where he remains a member to this day. He appeared at the Bayreuth Festival annually from 1970 through 1980, and was seen as the successor to Gerhard Stolze. During his time at the festival, he sang Loge and Mime in the Jahrhundertring (Centenary Ring) in 1976, celebrating the centenary of both the festival and the first performance of the complete cycle, conducted by Pierre Boulez and staged by Patrice Chéreau, recorded and filmed in 1979 and 1980.

Zednik made his debut at the Metropolitan Opera in 1981 as Mime in Das Rheingold. He returned to that house numerous times through 1998 in such roles as Don Basilio in The Marriage of Figaro, the Dancing Master in Ariadne auf Naxos, Monostatos, Pedrillo, and Prince Shuisky in Boris Godunov.

He played Mime in the 1990 PBS broadcast from the Metropolitan Opera, for the largest viewing-audience (world-wide) of the Ring in history.

He won two Grammy Awards, in 1982 and 1989, both for recording Wagner roles.
