= Uta Priew =

German mezzo-soprano

Uta Priew (born 3 August 1944) is a German operatic mezzo-soprano.

== Life ==
Born in Karlsbad, Priew began as a chorist at the Carl-Maria-von-Weber-Theater in Bernburg. She took singing lessons with Wolfgang Rainer and Erna Feierabend at the "Georg Friedrich Händel" Conservatory in Halle and with Maria Croonen at the University of Music and Theatre Leipzig.

In 1970, she was engaged by opera director Harry Kupfer at the Deutsches Nationaltheater und Staatskapelle Weimar and sang there in works by Mozart, Giuseppe Verdi, Johann Strauss, Christoph Willibald Gluck, Georges Bizet, Siegfried Matthus and Paul Dessau.

Since 1980, she was a member of the ensemble of the Staatsoper Unter den Linden in Berlin with roles such as Dorabella, Cherubino, Annius (La clemenza di Tito), Idamante, Selika (L'Africaine), Amneris, Cenerentola, Carmen, Jeanne in the opera The Devils of Loudun, Marie in Wozzeck, Klytämnestra, Herodias, Küsterin, Ortrud, Venus, Brangäne, Fricka, Waltraute and Kundry.

In 1984, she was appointed Kammersängerin. From 1988 to 2006, she was a permanent guest at the Bayreuth Festival with roles such as Kundry, Ortrud, Venus, Waltraute. From 1991 to 1996, she was a frequent guest at the Wiener Staatsoper with roles such as Kundry, Ortrud, Venus, Waltraute, Fricka and Brangäne.

Guest performances and concerts took place, among others also in Munich, Dresden, Düsseldorf, Hamburg, Paris, Milan, Copenhagen, Chicago, New York, Tokyo, Moscow, Tel Aviv, Nice, Monte Carlo, Sevilla under conductors such as Claudio Abbado, Daniel Barenboim, Pierre Boulez, Christoph von Dohnányi, Heinrich Hollreiser, James Levine, Kent Nagano, Peter Schneider, Giuseppe Sinopoli, Horst Stein, Otmar Suitner, and Marek Janowski.

Priew worked with directors such as Ruth Berghaus, Dieter Dorn, Adolf Dresen, Erhard Fischer, Claus Guth, Pet Halmen, Harry Kupfer and Peter Mussbach. From 1983 to 1992, as successor to Anny Schlemm, she played the boulotte in Walter Felsenstein's production of Barbe-bleue in 94 performances at the Komische Oper Berlin.

There have also been countless performances as a concert, oratorio and song interpreter, including works by Johann Sebastian Bach, Georg Friedrich Händel, Ludwig van Beethoven, Felix Mendelssohn Bartholdy, Pjotr Iljitsch Tschaikowski, Johannes Brahms, Franz Schubert, Robert Schumann, Hanns Eisler, Ottorino Respighi, Arnold Schoenberg and Gustav Mahler.

Priew gave master classes in Beijing and in St. Petersburg. Since 2000 she has been a lecturer at the Hochschule für Musik "Hanns Eisler", since 2007 honorary professor there.

== Recordings ==
- das Rheingold, Die Walküre, die Götterdämmerung.

== Video recording ==
- Brangäne in Tristan und Isolde 1995
- Dritte Norne Götterdämmerung 1992
