= Jean Cox =

American opera singer

Jean Cox (January 16, 1922 – June 24, 2012) was an American tenor.

== Early years ==
Cox was born in Gadsden, Alabama. He served in the United States Army Air Forces during World War II era as a pilot. After obtaining a degree in Music from the University of Alabama, he studied singing with Marie Sundelius at the New England Conservatory. He was subsequently awarded a Fulbright Scholarship which enabled him to study in Rome for a year.

== Opera career ==
Cox made his Italian debut at the Festival dei Due Mondi in Spoleto, where he appeared as Rodolfo in La bohème. He then relocated to Germany, singing at Kiel, Braunschweig and Mannheim.

He made his Bayreuth debut as the Steersman in The Flying Dutchman in 1956. He subsequently sang the heavier roles there in many seasons from 1967 until 1984, mainly Siegfried in Siegfried and Götterdämmerung. His international career extended mostly to Europe. He made his Covent Garden debut in October 1975, singing the title role in Siegfried. His Metropolitan Opera debut came in April 1976, when he appeared as Walther von Stolzing in Die Meistersinger von Nürnberg.

In 1977 he was nominated Kammersänger by the city of Mannheim.

He is known for Heldentenor roles including Siegfried, Tristan, Walther, Lohengrin, and Tannhäuser. He also sang Otello in Verdi's opera.

== Personal life and later years ==
Cox was married to the mezzo-soprano Anna Reynolds, whom he had met at Bayreuth and with whom he later ran a successful academy for aspiring singers. He died on June 24, 2012, in Bayreuth, aged 90.

== Partial discography ==
- Der fliegende Holländer (Daland's steersman). Bayreuth Festival, 1956, cond. Joseph Keilberth. Audio 2xCD. Walhall WLCD0190.
- Die Meistersinger von Nürnberg (Walther von Stolzing). Bayreuth Festival, cond. Silvio Varviso. Audio 4xCD. Philips PHI 434611 FC.
- "Der Ring des Nibelungen" 1977 Munich conducted Sawallisch complete live radio recording with Jean Cox as Siegfried OD 11681-12 Operadepot (2017)
