= Manfred Jung =

German opera singer

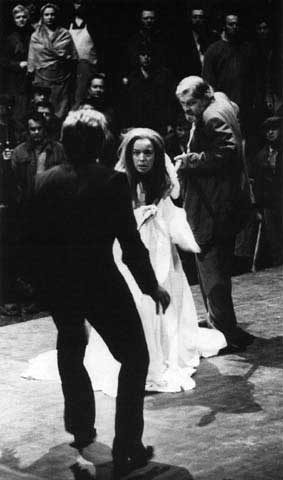
- Jung as Siegfried in the Jahrhundertring, with Gwyneth Jones, filmed in 1979
- Born: 9 July 1940; Oberhausen, Germany
- Died: 14 April 2017 (aged 76); Essen, Germany
- Education: Folkwangschule
- Occupation: Operatic tenor
- Organizations: Deutsche Oper am Rhein; Junge Musiker-Stiftung
- Awards: Grammy Award for Best Opera Recording (1982)
- Website: www.jung-manfred.de/opernsaenger/saenger

Manfred Jung (9 July 1940 – 14 April 2017) was a German operatic tenor, who performed Wagner's heldentenor roles internationally, including the Metropolitan Opera and the Bayreuth Festival where he was Siegfried in the Jahrhundertring, but he also sang all other tenor roles in Der Ring des Nibelungen.

== Biography ==
Born in Oberhausen, Jung worked as a lighting technician at the Grillo-Theater in Essen. He studied voice at the Folkwang-Hochschule with Hilde Wesselmann, completing the Staatsexamen in 1968. He was engaged at the Kammeroper (Chamber Opera) in Cologne, from 1971 to 1975 at the Opernhaus Dortmund, where he appeared in 27 lyrical tenor roles, including leading roles such as Tamino in Mozart's Die Zauberflöte and Hans in Smetana's Die verkaufte Braut. He then moved to the Pfalztheater in Kaiserslautern, where he performed more dramatic roles such as Max in Weber's Der Freischütz and Don José in Bizet's Carmen.

He made his debut in Bayreuth in 1967 at the Bayreuther Jugendfestspiele as Arindal in Wagner's Die Feen, and sang in the festival choir there from 1970 to 1973. In 1975, he appeared as a guest at the Salzburg Easter Festival with Herbert von Karajan. He sang as a guest at the Deutsche Oper am Rhein in 1976 and was engaged until 1988. When he appeared as a guest in Berlin in November 1976, he was recommended to the Bayreuth Festival, and appeared there as Siegfried in Götterdämmerung from 1977, in the Jahrhundertring staged by Patrice Chéreau for the centenary of the festival and the stage work, alongside Gwyneth Jones as Brünnhilde, and conducted by Pierre Boulez. He sang in Bayreuth several heldentenor roles, including three different cycles of The Ring.

He appeared internationally, such as 1980 in New York's Carnegie Hall, in 1981 at the Vienna State Opera and the Metropolitan Opera in New York. Jung and the rest of the cast received the Grammy Award for Best Opera Recording for their recording of the Jahrhundertring conducted by Pierre Boulez, as Siegfried in both Siegfried and Götterdämmerung at the 25th Annual Grammy Awards. He was one of few singers who performed all tenor parts in Der Ring des Nibelungen.

Jung was from c. 2005 the artistic director of the Junge Musiker-Stiftung, a Bayreuth foundation running the singing competition Cantilena Gesangswettbewerb for young singers in the categories opera, concert and operetta. He died in Essen.

== Bibliography ==
- Ulrike Gondorf: Erleben ist wichtiger als Singen. Der Wagner-Tenor Manfred Jung; in: fermate. Rheinisches Musikmagazin, 2/1983, Verlag Dohr, 1983
