= Karl Ridderbusch =

German operatic singer (1932–1997)

Karl Ridderbusch (29 May 1932 – 21 June 1997) was a German operatic bass, associated in particular with the music of Wagner. He was recognised as a notable exponent of the role of Hans Sachs.

== Background and early career ==
Karl Ridderbusch was born in Recklinghausen, Germany, and was discovered at an amateur music competition by the tenor Rudolf Schock who helped pay for the younger singer's training. Ridderbusch had previously planned to work as an engineer for his father. After studying at the conservatoire in Duisburg and the Folkwang Hochschule in Essen, he made his debut at the State Theatre in Münster in 1961. Roles he sang there included the Commendatore and Phillip II. Ridderbusch's next post was in Essen where he added major roles by Verdi, Strauss and Wagner to his repertoire. In 1965, he joined the Deutsche Oper am Rhein, where he was based for the rest of his career. Roles there included Phillip II, Henry VIII, Sparafucile, Boris Godunov and Hunding.

== Maturity ==
Ridderbusch's voice ranged over two octaves, allowing him to sing bass-baritone roles, such as Hans Sachs and Don Pizarro, and not just bass parts. Its qualities have been described as "firm clear sonorous and rich in timbre" and as "magnificently resonant [and] dark-coloured". He was known for his ability to maintain beauty of tone even at his loudest. He also had a formidable stage presence.

Ridderbusch appeared at many of the world's major opera houses, including La Scala (from 1966), the Metropolitan Opera (1967), the Vienna State Opera (1968), and the Royal Opera House, Covent Garden (1971). He made his Bayreuth Festival debut in 1967 as Henry the Fowler. Between then and his last appearance there in 1977, Ridderbusch sang the roles of Fasolt, Hunding, and Hagen in the Ring, Pogner and Hans Sachs in the Mastersingers, Daland in The Flying Dutchman, Titurel in Parsifal and King Marke in Tristan und Isolde. He also sang Hans Sachs at the 1974 and 1975 Salzburg Easter Festivals, and at the Met and at the Chicago Lyric Opera. Gurnemanz was another Wagnerian role which he sang at several houses during the 1980s.

Away from Wagner, other parts he sang included Rocco, the Doctor in Wozzeck, Caspar, and Sarastro. Among Ridderbusch's comic roles were Baron Ochs, Kecal, and Dr Bartolo. Although he was successful in these, it was the dramatic roles which he excelled. He was honoured as a Kammersänger by the Vienna State Opera in 1978. He also appeared in the concert hall, especially in sacred choral works.

== Personal life ==
Karl Ridderbusch died at his home in Wels, Austria, from heart problems and liver disease. He married twice and had three children.

== Recordings ==
Several of Karl Ridderbusch's studio recordings were in collaboration with Herbert von Karajan. These include the Ring, Mastersingers, Tristan, "Fidelio", Lohengrin and J. S. Bach's Mass in B minor following performances at the Salzburg Easter Festival. Karl Böhm was another frequent studio partner. Their recordings together include Strauss's Capriccio, Beethoven's 9th Symphony and Mozart's Requiem. Other studio collaborations include the Saint Matthew Passion with Nikolaus Harnoncourt, Leonore with Herbert Blomstedt, and Bruckner's Mass in D minor with Eugen Jochum. Among all these, his obituarists have selected Ridderbusch's portrayal of the goldsmith Veit Pogner, the wealthiest of the Mastersingers, and of the impresario La Roche in Capriccio as his most memorable work in the studio.

Recordings from the Bayreuth Festival include Mastersingers under both Böhm and Silvio Varviso, Dutchman under Böhm, Lohengrin under both Rudolf Kempe and Alberto Erede and Parsifal under both Pierre Boulez and Jochum. Live recordings also exist of Ridderbusch singing another role with which he is associated - that of Baron Ochs in Der Rosenkavalier. Ridderbusch's stage presence survives on two commercial videos; as Fafner in Karajan's filming of his Salzburg Rheingold and as Kecal, the marriage broker, in a German-language version of The Bartered Bride.

Solo recordings include Karl Ridderbusch: a portrait and an eponymous double album, both listed by German vendors, and a Loewe recital on LP for Deutsche Grammophon, since anthologised as part of a double CD release of the composer.
