= Richard Peduzzi =

French scenographer (born 1943)

- Born: January 28, 1943 (age 82); Argentan, France
- Occupation: scenographer

Richard Peduzzi (born 1943 in Argentan, Orne) is a French scenographer. He was the director of the French Academy in Rome from September 2002 to August 2008.

Since 1969, he has decorated the sets designed by Patrice Chéreau, and together they have put on several dramatic texts by Bernard-Marie Koltès. In the theatre, they participated in the centennial productions of Wagner's Der Ring des Nibelungen at the Bayreuth Festival conducted by Pierre Boulez. For the Opéra National de Paris, they presented Alban Berg's Lulu, and Offenbach's The Tales of Hoffmann, and for the La Scala, Milan, they collaborated on Wagner's Tristan und Isolde (2007). Peduzzi also created films with Chéreau, such as La Reine Margot and Ceux qui m'aiment prendront le train. He was nominated for a César Award for Best Production Design in 1976 for his work on La Chair de l'orchidée.

Peduzzi's sets are often formed of large vertical masses symbolising the dangers that threaten the characters.
