= Hanna Schwarz =

German mezzo-soprano and contralto

- Born: 15 August 1943 (age 81); Germany
- Education: Folkwang Hochschule; Musikhochschule Hannover
- Occupation(s): Classical mezzo-soprano and contralto
- Organizations: Staatsoper Hannover; Hamburg State Opera

Hanna Schwarz (born 15 August 1943) is a German mezzo-soprano and contralto singer in opera and concert. In 1976 she performed the roles of Fricka and Erda in the centenary Jahrhundertring production at the Bayreuth Festival, directed by Patrice Chéreau.

== Career ==
Schwarz studied psychology and voice in Hamburg and continued at the Folkwang Hochschule and at the Musikhochschule Hannover. She became a member of the Staatsoper Hannover and made her debut as Siegrune in Wagner's Die Walküre. Her first major success was Maddalena in Verdi's Rigoletto. In 1972 she appeared in the title role of Bizet's Carmen at the Eutiner Festspiele. From 1973 she was a member of the Hamburg State Opera, where she performed for more than 30 years.

Schwarz made her debut at the Bayreuth Festival in 1975 in the role of Floßhilde in Der Ring des Nibelungen and performed there until 1998. In 1976 she appeared as Fricka and Erda in the centenary Jahrhundertring production directed by Patrice Chéreau, in the repertoire until 1980, recorded for television and published on DVD. In Bayreuth, she appeared also as Brangäne in Tristan und Isolde from 1981 and Waltraute in Götterdämmerung from 1984, as well as Roßweiße and Second Norn in the Ring, and Blumenmädchen and Knappe in Parsifal.

Schwarz made her US debut in 1977 as Fricka with the San Francisco Opera. She appeared as Cherubino in Mozart's Le nozze di Figaro at Deutsche Oper Berlin. In 1979 she appeared in three roles, Theatre Dresser, Schoolboy and Groom, in the Paris premiere of Alban Berg's Lulu in the version completed by Friedrich Cerha. In 1980 she performed as Waltraute in the 1980 Covent Garden Ring cycle. She appeared as Herodias in Salome by Richard Strauss in 1982 at the Salzburg Festival and in 1996 at the Metropolitan Opera. In the premiere of Alfred Schnittke's Historia von D. Johann Fausten on 22 June 1995, she performed as Mephistophela. She sang Erda in Das Rheingold in Basel in September 2023.

She has made many appearances as a concert artist, and features in a large number of recordings. As an interpreter of lieder, she often performed with pianist Sebastian Peschko. Hanna Schwarz is a professor at Hochschule für Musik und Theater Hamburg.

== Sources ==
- "Hanna Schwarz (Mezzo-soprano, Contralto)". Bach Cantatas Website. 2001.
