= Siegfried Jerusalem =

German operatic tenor (born 1940)

- Born: 17 April 1940 (age 85); Oberhausen
- Education: Folkwangschule
- Occupations: Operatic tenor; Academic voice teacher
- Awards: Federal Cross of Merit

Siegfried Jerusalem (born 17 April 1940) is a German operatic tenor. Closely identified with the heldentenor roles of Richard Wagner, he has performed Siegfried, Siegmund, Lohengrin, Parsifal, and Tristan to wide acclaim. Since the 1990s, he has focused on lieder, particularly those by Strauss, Mahler and Schumann.

== Beginnings ==
Jerusalem was born at Oberhausen, and studied piano, violin and bassoon at the Folkwangschule in Essen. He began his career as bassoonist, being engaged in Hof in 1961 and for the next ten years in Reutlingen: from 1971 until 1977, he was attached to the Radio Symphony Orchestra of the South-German Radio in Stuttgart. In 1971, he also began taking voice lessons with Hertha Kalcher of Stuttgart. In 1975, when due to perform in the orchestra of a television production of Der Zigeunerbaron, he stood in for the tenor Franco Bonisolli at the last minute.

== Operatic singer ==
Thenceforth Jerusalem made singing his career. His first major role was Lohengrin in 1976, a role in which he soon appeared at Darmstadt, Aachen, Hamburg, and at the Zürcher Festspiele, and later in Munich and the New York Metropolitan Opera. He followed this with Max in Der Freischütz at Stuttgart. His Bayreuth career opened in 1977, where, by 1981, he had performed Froh (Das Rheingold), the Young Sailor (Tristan und Isolde) and then Lohengrin, Parsifal and Walter von Stolzing (Die Meistersinger von Nürnberg).

His Parsifal was also heard in Vienna at that time, and his Siegmund (Die Walküre) (with Jessye Norman, Theo Adam and Yvonne Minton) in Dresden (1981). In addition to stage appearances he gave various concert performances which, like the Dresden Walküre or the Rome Lohengrin were broadcast internationally. From 1978, he became a regular member of the Deutsche Oper Berlin, and had permanent contract with the companies in Stuttgart, Zürich, Munich, and Vienna as well as making international guest appearances.

His Bayreuth career continued with Siegfried in 1988 (Siegfried) and 1989 (Götterdämmerung). In 1990, he appeared at the Metropolitan Opera with James Levine, singing both Siegfrieds, as well as the difficult role of Loge. The production was televised, and is available on DVD. In 1992, his Bayreuth-Siegfried was made as a DVD again. On this performance, Jerusalem was singing with Graham Clark, Anne Evans and John Tomlinson, and 1993 he debuted as Tristan at the Bayreuth Festival, and took the role to most of the major houses in Europe.

== Awards ==
On 9 October 1997, he was presented with the German Federal Cross of Merit. His last performance at Bayreuth was in 1999 as Tristan. He currently teaches at the College of Music in Nuremberg.

== Recordings ==
Jerusalem performs in a series of audio and video recordings of Wagner operas conducted by James Levine at the Met, Daniel Barenboim and Pierre Boulez at Bayreuth, and others made in the 1980s and 1990s.

Jerusalem has also made an attempt at some crossover music in two albums The Glory of Love (1996) and Avalon (2002).
