= Peter Hofmann =

German tenor (1944–2010)

- Hofmann as Siegmund at the Metropolitan Opera in 1986
- Born: 22 August 1944; Marienbad
- Died: 30 November 2010 (aged 66); Bayreuth, Bavaria, Germany
- Occupations: Operatic tenor; Pop singer
- Organizations: Bayreuth Festival

Peter Hofmann (22 August 1944 – 30 November 2010) was a German tenor who had a successful performance career within the fields of opera, rock, pop, and musical theatre. He first rose to prominence as a heldentenor at the Bayreuth festival's Jahrhundertring (Centenary Ring) in 1976, where he drew critical acclaim for his performance of Siegmund in Wagner's Die Walküre. He was active as one of the world's leading Wagnerian tenors over the next decade, performing roles such as Lohengrin, Parsifal, and Tristan at major opera houses and festivals internationally.

Hofmann's busy and demanding schedule in combination with an "imperfect vocal technique", led to intermittent vocal problems which became more prominent in the singer's opera performances in the late 1980s. These difficulties led him to completely abandon his opera career in 1989 in favor of pursuing a full-time career in popular music. Hofmann had already spent portions of his opera career performing and recording popular music, and he had already achieved success with tours and recordings of classic rock during the mid to late 1980s. He continued to perform pop and rock songs until his retirement from performance for health reasons in 1999. He had been diagnosed with Parkinson's disease in 1994.

== Early life and education ==
Hofmann was born in Marienbad, German Sudetenland (now Mariánské Lázně, Czech Republic), and grew up in Darmstadt. In his youth, before receiving any training in classical music, he was a singer in a rock band. He was a youth decathlon competitor and served seven years in the Bundeswehr, during which time he began studying singing privately. After being honorably discharged with a financial bonus, he entered the Hochschule für Musik Karlsruhe where he was trained as an opera singer. |

== Opera career ==
Hofmann made his professional opera debut in 1972 as Tamino in Mozart's Die Zauberflöte at Theater Lübeck. He first appeared as Siegmund in Wagner's Die Walküre, to become his signature role, at the Wuppertal Opera in 1974. It was as Siegmund that Hofmann first drew international acclaim when he performed the role in the historic Jahrhundertring (Centenary Ring) at the Bayreuth Festival in 1976, celebrating the centenary of both the festival and the first performance of the complete Ring cycle, conducted by Pierre Boulez and staged by Patrice Chéreau, recorded and filmed in 1979 and 1980. He also performed in Bayreuth as Tristan in Tristan und Isolde (1986), Walther in Die Meistersinger von Nürnberg (1988). and the title heroes in Parsifal (both 1976 and 1978) and Lohengrin (1979 and 1982),

He subsequently appeared in Stuttgart, Paris, Vienna, London, Chicago, and San Francisco. He was best known for singing Wagnerian tenor roles. He appeared at the Metropolitan Opera from 1980 to 1988, in Lohengrin, Parsifal, Die Meistersinger and Die Walküre.

== Light music career ==
At the same time as singing classic roles in opera, Hofmann was also busy performing and recording popular music. He performed concerts of Elvis Presley songs and other classic rock songs on tour across Europe. He made a number of pop albums which sold well in Europe such as Rock Classics (1982) and Love Me Tender: Peter Hofmann Sings Elvis Presley (1992). In 1987, Hallmark released Songs for the Holidays, an album featuring Hofmann and his wife Deborah Sasson née O'Brien, who was Miss Massachusetts in 1971.

By the late 1980s, Hofmann had abandoned opera completely in favour of musical theatre. From 1990 to 1991, he played the title role in The Phantom of the Opera, in the original Hamburg production, making 300 appearances in the show. He also hosted a TV show in Germany.

== Personal life and later years ==
Hofmann was married to Deborah Sasson from 1983 to 1990 and to Sabine Zimmerer from 2007 to 2010. His divorce cost him a fortune, and he lived the last years of his life in relative poverty.

Hofmann moved to Bayreuth and spent his time writing his autobiography and supporting research through the Peter Hofmann Parkinson Project.

After battling Parkinson's disease for more than a decade, he died of pneumonia in November 2010 at the age of 66.

== Recordings ==
From Bayreuth, Hofmann appeared as Siegmund in the 1980 Die Walküre, alongside Gwyneth Jones as Brünnhilde (Deutsche Grammophon), and in the title role of the 1982 Lohengrin, alonside Karan Armstrong as Elsa conducted by Woldemar Nelsson in Götz Friedrich's production (EuroArts).

In the studio, he made a 1978 recording of Die Zauberflöte conducted by Alain Lombard with Kiri Te Kanawa and Kathleen Battle, then as Florestam in Beethoven's Fidelio, conducted by Georg Solti in 1979, as Parsifal alongside Dunja Vejzovic's Kundry, led by Herbert von Karajan (1979–80), and alongside Waltraud Meier's Kundry, led by James Levine, live in 1985. He appeared in a recording of Gluck's Orfeo ed Euridice in 1982 and as Erik in Wagner's Der fliegende Holländer, with José van Dam in the title role and Vejzovic, conducted by Karajan (1981–83). A 1986 performance as Lohengrin at the Metropolitan Opera, conducted by Levine, was released on Pioneer Classics in 2000. Hofmann also performed in Leonard Bernstein's live recording of Tristan und Isolde in 1981.

== Sources ==
- The Oxford Dictionary of Opera, by John Warrack and Ewan West (1992), 782 pages, ISBN 0-19-869164-5
