= Hans Sotin =

German operatic bass

Hans Sotin (born 10 September 1939) is a German operatic bass.

He was born in Dortmund and studied at the Dortmund Hochschule für Musik. He made his operatic debut in 1962 in Essen as the Police Commissioner in Strauss's Der Rosenkavalier. He joined the Hamburg State Opera in 1964 where he was made a Kammersänger. He had a long career in which he sang most of the major bass roles in many opera houses, both in Europe and America. He made numerous appearances at the Bayreuth Festival over several decades.

His signature roles were Sarastro and the major Wagnerian noble-bass roles, including King Marke, Gurnemanz, the Landgrave, and Veit Pogner. He occasionally played Baron Ochs, and Hunding. He played Wotan a few times.

Sotin made numerous recordings of operatic, sacred, and symphonic works, including the Verdi Requiem, the Rossini Stabat Mater, Beethoven's Choral Symphony, Missa Solemnis and Mass in C, Mahler's Symphony of a Thousand, Mozart's Mass in C minor, Haydn's Paukenmesse, and Creation, Bach's Saint Matthew Passion, and the roles of Sarastro and the Second Armed Man in two recordings of The Magic Flute, King Marke in Tristan und Isolde, King Heinrich der Vogler in Lohengrin, and Don Alfonso in Cosi fan tutte. He can be seen on video as Sarastro as Gurnemanz, and as the Landgrave.

He sang, and recorded, some of the heroic ballads and odes by Carl Loewe.

Since 1992, he has been a professor at the Hochschule für Musik Köln. His retirement from the stage was celebrated on 1 June 2012 at the Richard Wagner Festival in Wels.
