= Yvonne Minton =

British opera singer (born 1938)

Yvonne Fay Minton CBE (born 4 December 1938) is an Australian-born but mostly British-resident opera singer. She is variously billed as a soprano, mezzo-soprano or contralto.

A native of Sydney, she studied voice while on a scholarship at the New South Wales Conservatorium of Music. She won the £1000 Shell Aria, run in conjunction with the 1960 National Eisteddfod, Canberra. By this stage she had become one of the country's leading contraltos, often appearing on radio and television and with the Sydney and Queensland orchestras.

Minton left Australia in 1961 to pursue her studies in London. The same year, she won the Kathleen Ferrier Prize for the best contralto at the International Vocal Competition 's-Hertogenbosch in the Netherlands. Her first major part in England was as Maggie Dempster in the premiere of Nicholas Maw's One Man Show. She sang the role of Clotilde on the 1965 Decca recording of Bellini's Norma.

Shortly thereafter, she became a regular member of the company of the Royal Opera House, Covent Garden, appearing in such roles as Lola in Cavalleria rusticana. She created the role of Thea in Tippett's The Knot Garden (1970) and appeared at the Cologne Opera from 1969 (début as Sesto in La clemenza di Tito). She has since appeared with most of the major English orchestras and in opera houses throughout Europe and the United States. She has also appeared at Bayreuth (Brangäne in Tristan und Isolde) and the Salzburg Festival 1978 (Octavian). In 1973, she made her Metropolitan Opera debut as Octavian in Strauss's Der Rosenkavalier. She sang the role of Countess Geschwitz in Lulu in Paris in 1979. She has also made many concert appearances, notably with Sir Georg Solti and the Chicago Symphony Orchestra.

Her recordings include Parsifal (Armin Jordan), Der Rosenkavalier (Georg Solti), The Marriage of Figaro (Colin Davis), Bach's Mass in B minor (Karl Münchinger), Rossini's Stabat Mater (István Kertész), Elgar's The Dream of Gerontius, Mahler's The Song of the Earth, Lieder eines fahrenden Gesellen, Des Knaben Wunderhorn (all with Solti), Tristan und Isolde (Leonard Bernstein), and Béatrice et Bénédict (Daniel Barenboim).

In the New Year Honours 1980, she was appointed Commander of the Order of the British Empire (CBE) for services to music.

== Sources ==
- New York Times review of Eugene Onegin at Glyndebourne, 4 June 1994, accessed 21 January 2010
- Musicweb review of Berlioz recordings, accessed 21 January 2010
