= Hainer Hill =

German scenic designer

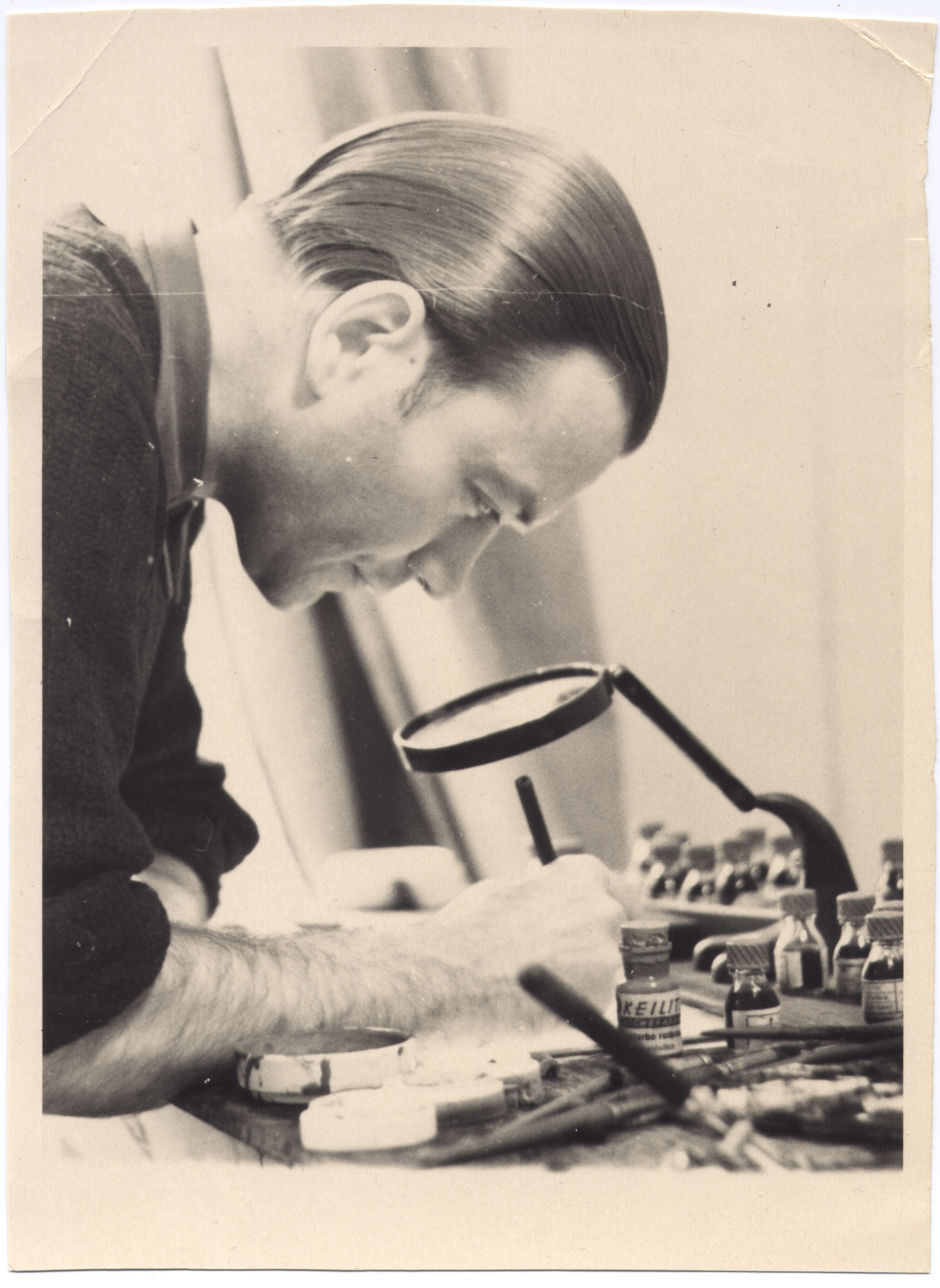
- Hainer Hill at work, c. 1956
- Born: Heinrich Hill; 28 July 1913; Eberstadt, German Empire
- Died: 20 August 2001 (aged 88); Karlsruhe, Germany
- Education: Städel'sche Kunstschule
- Occupations: Scenic designer; Costume designer; Painter; Graphic artist; Theatre photographer
- Organizations: Berliner Ensemble; Opernhaus Dortmund

Hainer Hill (born Heinrich Hill; 28 July 1913 – 20 August 2001) was a German scenic designer, costume designer, painter, graphic artist and theatre photographer who was based in Berlin and worked internationally. After studying painting in Frankfurt, he worked at the Oper Frankfurt, assisting Caspar Neher. Together they moved to Brecht's Berliner Ensemble where Hill created an iconic stage for Mutter Courage and took hundreds of scene photographs now archived at the Akademie der Künste. When the Berlin Wall was erected, Hill, who lived in the West and had worked in the East, began to work freelance, including at the Royal Opera House. In 1966 he became director of scenery (Ausstattunggsleiter) at Opernhaus Dortmund, and there he created the stage for the world premiere of Eli by Walter Steffens, which was followed by 45 other productions. Hill is best remembered for his focus on light projection.

== Life and work ==
=== 1913–1945 ===
Born in Eberstadt (now part of Darmstadt), he was called Hainer at an early age. His mother was a tailor and his father a decoration painter. Beginning in 1927, following elementary school, Hill was trained as a house painter. Simultaneously, he took a course in decoration painting at the Städtischen Gewerbeschule in Darmstadt. Starting in 1931, he continued his education at the Staatsschule für Kunst und Handwerk, studying painting under Richard Throll. He received his diploma in May 1935. While at university, he created many watercolours, drawings, and oil paintings. He then worked as an assistant to Ludwig Sievert, the chief scenic designer at the Städtische Bühnen Frankfurt. In December 1935, with a scholarship, he was a 'master student' (Meisterschüler) of Franz Karl Delavilla at Städel'sche Kunstschule. Hill's focus became the use of lighting, and its influence on the space on stage and its relation to the dynamic of music. At the Oper Frankfurt, he met the designer Caspar Neher, and made projections realising Neher's ideas, for projects in Frankfurt, later also in Berlin, Darmstadt, Hamburg, Glyndebourne, Berlin and Vienna, for 34 productions between 1936 and 1951.

=== 1945–1961 ===
After World War II, Hill worked as scenic designer at the Städtische Bühnen Gera and then at the Schauspiel Leipzig, where he met Bertolt Brecht in 1950. He followed him to Berlin, working until 1953 as scenic designer and assistant director, with Brecht, Therese Giehse, Benno Besson and Egon Monk. He introduced the technique of projections, which impressed the critic Friedrich Luft and the playwright Heiner Müller. He also turned to theatre photography, producing hundreds of photographs of scenes from such Berliner Ensemble plays as Mutter Courage, Urfaust, Dom Juan, Die Gewehre der Frau Carrar and Der Kaukasische Kreidekreis. He worked as a guest at the Schillertheater, the Komische Oper Berlin, the Hamburg State Opera and again in Frankfurt. From 1953, he was chief scenic, light and costumes designer (Ausstattungsleiter) at the Staatsoper Berlin, which then played at the Admiralspalast. He moved to West-Berlin in 1954, which made later international work possible. When the opera house Unter den Linden was reopened, he designed the stage for Alban Berg's Wozzeck, played on 14 December 1955, conducted by Johannes Schüler and staged by Werner Kelch, which became an unexpected success. He created designs for Elektra by Richard Strauss, Gluck's Orpheus und Eurydike, Borodin's Fürst Igor, Egk's Der Revisor, Jean Kurt Forest's Tai Yang erwacht and Mussorgski's Chowanschtschina. In 1959, Hill held a Master class for projection painting at the Bayreuth Festival. He designed the set for the first scenic presentation of Bach's St Matthew Passion in Europe at the Teatro Massimo in Palermo, conducted by Hermann Scherchen

=== 1961–2001 ===
The building of the Berlin Wall in 1961 caused a break in his career. As all positions in West Berlin were taken, he began to work freelance in the world, carrying a mobile workshop. In 1961 he designed for Wagner Der Ring des Nibelungen at the Teatro dell'Opera di Roma, well received by the press. In 1962 he was a guest at the Badisches Staatstheater Karlsruhe, and received a contract the following year. He created, beginning with Tchaikovsky's Pique Dame, scenes for 27 plays and operas. In 1963, he designed stage and costumes for Wagner's Lohengrin at the Royal Opera House in London, conducted by Otto Klemperer, with Sandor Konya in the title role and Régine Crespin as Elsa. In 1966 when the new Opernhaus Dortmund opened, he designed the stage for Hindemith's Mathis der Maler, conducted by Hans Swarowsky. He remained at the house from 1967 to 1976 as Ausstattungsleiter and Erster Bühnenbildner, working with conductors Wilhelm Schüchter, Werner Egk, Hans Wallat and Marek Janowski, and directors Hans Hartleb, Paul Hager, Jan Biczycki and Karl Paryla. Among his 45 projects there, he designed the stage for the world premiere of Eli by Walter Steffens. His last major project was a collaboration with Harry Buckwitz in 1977 at the Schauspielhaus Zürich Schweyk im Zweiten Weltkrieg, with Helmut Lohner and Christiane Hörbiger in the leading roles. He then turned to designs and drawings.

Hill died on 20 August 2001 in Karlsruhe. His gravestone shows his motto: "Die Seele des Bühnenraums ist das Licht. Es gibt der Phantasie des Betrachters die notwendige Orientierung" ("The lighting is the soul of the stage. From it, the imagination of the audience gets the orientation it needs".) His estate is held at three locations, by Deutsches Theatermuseum, in the Generallandesarchiv Karlsruhe, and in the Bertolt-Brecht-Archiv der Akademie der Künste, especially his photographs of Brecht's performances with the Berliner Ensemble.
