= Alfred Vökt =

Swiss operatic tenor

- Born: 21 May 1926; Basel, Switzerland
- Died: 14 June 1999 (aged 73); Basel, Switzerland
- Education: University of Basel
- Occupation: Operatic tenor
- Organizations: Staatstheater Kassel; Opernhaus Dortmund; Oper Frankfurt

Alfred Vökt (German: [fœkt]; 21 May 1926 – 14 June 1999) was a Swiss operatic tenor who made a career at major opera houses, mainly in Germany. He focused on supporting roles and took part in world premieres such as Henze's König Hirsch in Kassel and Hans Zender's Stephen Climax at the Oper Frankfurt in 1986. Vökt appeared at major European opera houses and festivals.

== Career ==
Born in Basel, Vökt first studied law at the University of Basel, being awarded a Doctor of Law in 1955; at the same time, he studied voice with Ernst Reiter. He was a member of a choir in Basel from 1950 to 1958.

He was an ensemble member of Theater Basel from 1955 to 1957. He was then a member of the Städtische Bühnen Oberhausen (1958–1959), Stadttheater Gießen (1959–1960), Opernhaus Kiel (1960–1962) and the Staatstheater Kassel (1962–1965). In Kassel, he appeared as Ceccho in the world premiere of the complete version of Henze's König Hirsch on 10 March 1963, and as the Father in Ján Cikker's Abend, Nacht und Morgen on 5 October 1963. He sang at the Opernhaus Dortmund from 1965 to 1968, where he appeared as Valzacchi in Der Rosenkavalier by Richard Strauss in the opening performance of the new opera house on 3 March 1966. Other roles there included the Narrator in Orff's Der Mond, Goro in Puccini's Madama Butterfly, the Knusperhexe in Humperdinck's Hänsel und Gretel, Wenzel in Smetana's Die verkaufte Braut and Wolfgang Capito in Hindemith's Mathis der Maler. He took part in the premiere of Eli by Walter Steffens in 1967.

Vökt was a member of the Oper Frankfurt from 1968 to 1992 and appeared as a guest thereafter. In Frankfurt, he created the role of the Tanzlehrer (dance master) in Hans Zender's Stephen Climax on 15 June 1986. Other roles there included Bardolfo in Verdi's Falstaff, Hauk-Šendorf in Janáček's Die Sache Makropulos and Monsieur Triquet in Tchaikovsky's Eugen Onegin.

Vökt appeared as a guest in Bordeaux, at La Monnaie in Brussels, the Deutsche Oper am Rhein in Düsseldorf-Duisburg, the Edinburgh Festival, the Hamburgische Staatsoper, the Théâtre Musical de Paris, in Toulouse and at the Theater an der Wien. He sang on radio for the WDR.

Vökt was also active in concert. In 1976, he recorded the part of the Evangelist in Bach's Christmas Oratorio (Parts I to IV) in Düsseldorf, with Ingeborg Reichelt singing the soprano part and E. Wolfram Fürll conducting.

Vökt died on 14 June 1999 in his hometown.

== Roles ==
Vökt's roles also included:

- Jacob Glock in Prokofiev's L’Ange de feu
- Jeroschka in Borodin's Fürst Igor
- Professor von Mucker in Henze's Der junge Lord
- Schwachsinniger (The yuródivïy) in Mussorgsky's Boris Godunow

== Awards ==
- 1987: Kammersänger in Frankfurt am Main
