= Hans Hartleb (director) =

German opera director

Hans Hugo Christian Hartleb (3 May 1910 – ?) was a German opera director who worked internationally, focused on contemporary opera.

== Life ==
Born in Kassel, Hartleb first engaged in theatre studies at the Ludwig-Maximilians-Universität München and received his doctorate there in 1936. In 1935, he became head director at the Volksoper in Berlin. From 1947 to 1956, he worked in a similar position at the Grillo-Theater in Essen, from 1956 to 1961 at the Oper Frankfurt and from 1961 to 1967 at the Bavarian State Opera in Munich. He then worked as a freelance director.

Hartleb's special domain was modern opera as well as the Italian repertoire. He was the director of the national premieres of Berg's Lulu in Germany, the Netherlands and Sweden. In 1967, he directed the world premiere of Eli by Walter Steffens at the Opernhaus Dortmund. He translated several operas from Italian, French, English and Czech into German.

== Publications ==
- Deutschlands erster Theaterbau. Eine Geschichte des Theaterlebens und der englischen Komödianten unter Maurice, Landgrave of Hesse-Kassel. Walter de Gruyter, Berlin among others 1936.
