= Johannes Schüler =

German conductor (1894–1966)

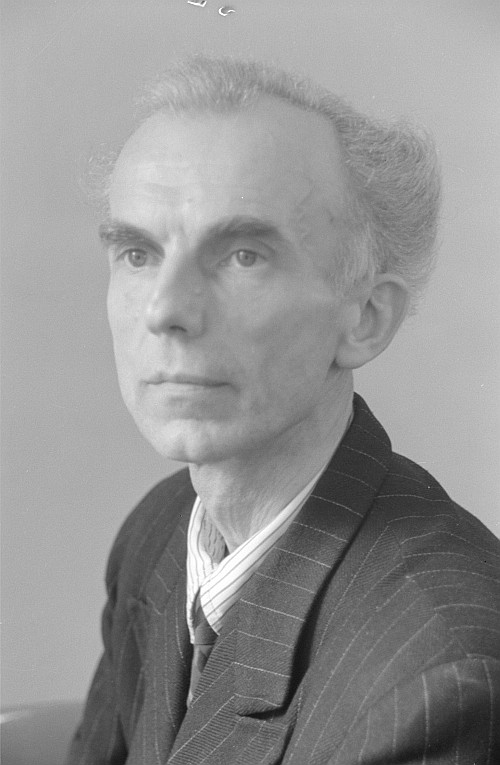
- Born: 21 June 1894; Vietz, German Empire
- Died: 3 October 1966 (aged 72); Berlin, Germany
- Education: University of Berlin; Musikhochschule Charlottenburg
- Occupation: Conductor
- Organizations: Berlin State Opera; Staatsoper Hannover
- Title: Generalmusikdirektor

Johannes Schüler (21 June 1894 – 3 October 1966) was a German conductor. He held leading positions at opera houses such as the Berlin State Opera and the Staatsoper Hannover. He promoted contemporary music, leading the world premieres of Alban Berg's Three Pieces for Orchestra in 1930, and Henze's Boulevard Solitude in 1952.

== Life ==
Schüler was born in Vietz (now Witnica, Poland), the son of an organist. He studied at the University of Berlin and the Musikhochschule Charlottenburg from 1913 to 1914, and again after the World War, in which he served in the military from 1918 to 1920. He studied conducting with Rudolf Krasselt and composition with Paul Juon. In 1920, he began his career as second Kapellmeister at the Stadttheater Gleiwitz in Upper Silesia. In 1922, he changed to the Stadttheater Königsberg, and in 1924 for the first time to the Opernhaus Hannover, where he was Zweiter Kapellmeiser under Krasselt.

In 1928, Schüler became Landesmusikdirektor in Oldenburg where he remained for four years. He became noted for his engagement with contemporary music, becoming one of the first to conduct Alban Berg's Wozzeck. On 14 April 1930, he conducted the world premiere of Berg's Three Pieces for Orchestra, Op. 6, with the Oldenburger Landesorchester. He, along with his predecessor, Werner Ladwig, made Oldenburg a centre of contemporary music in Germany. In 1932, Schüler moved to the Halle Opera House. After the Nazis seized power in 1933, he was municipal music director in Essen to 1936, and was appointed to the Berlin State Opera in 1935.

In 1937, he joined the Nazi Party and in 1938 was appointed by Hitler as "Staatskapellmeister", and the following year Generalintendant. On 3 October 1943, he performed with the Berlin Philharmonic in occupied Kraków. Schüler conducted the first complete recording of Flotow's Martha, with Erna Berger and Peter Anders in the leading roles. He conducted the last performance at the Berlin State Opera on 31 August 1944, Mozart's Figaro, before all German theatres were closed because of World War II. Hitler listed him as Gottbegnadet, which saved him from military duties.

After the war, he was responsible for the opera's rebuilding. He conducted the first Berlin performance of Hindemith's Mathis der Maler at the State Opera in 1948. In 1949, he went to Hanover for the second time, where he was Generalmusikdirektor (GMD) until 1960. He conducted the world premiere of Henze's Boulevard Solitude on 17 February 1952, staged by Jean-Pierre Ponnelle. He maintained relations with the Berlin State Opera as a regular guest conductor. He conducted Verdi's Rigoletto on 20 September 1945, directed by Wolf Völker. In 1954, he took part in the company's first guest appearance in Paris. In Berlin, he conducted Tchaikovsky's Eugen Onegin on 4 October 1955, staged by Erich-Alexander Winds, and Wozzeck on 14 December that year, directed by Werner Kelch with stage design by Hainer Hill.

Schüler died in Berlin at the age of 72.
