= Walter Steffens (composer) =

German composer

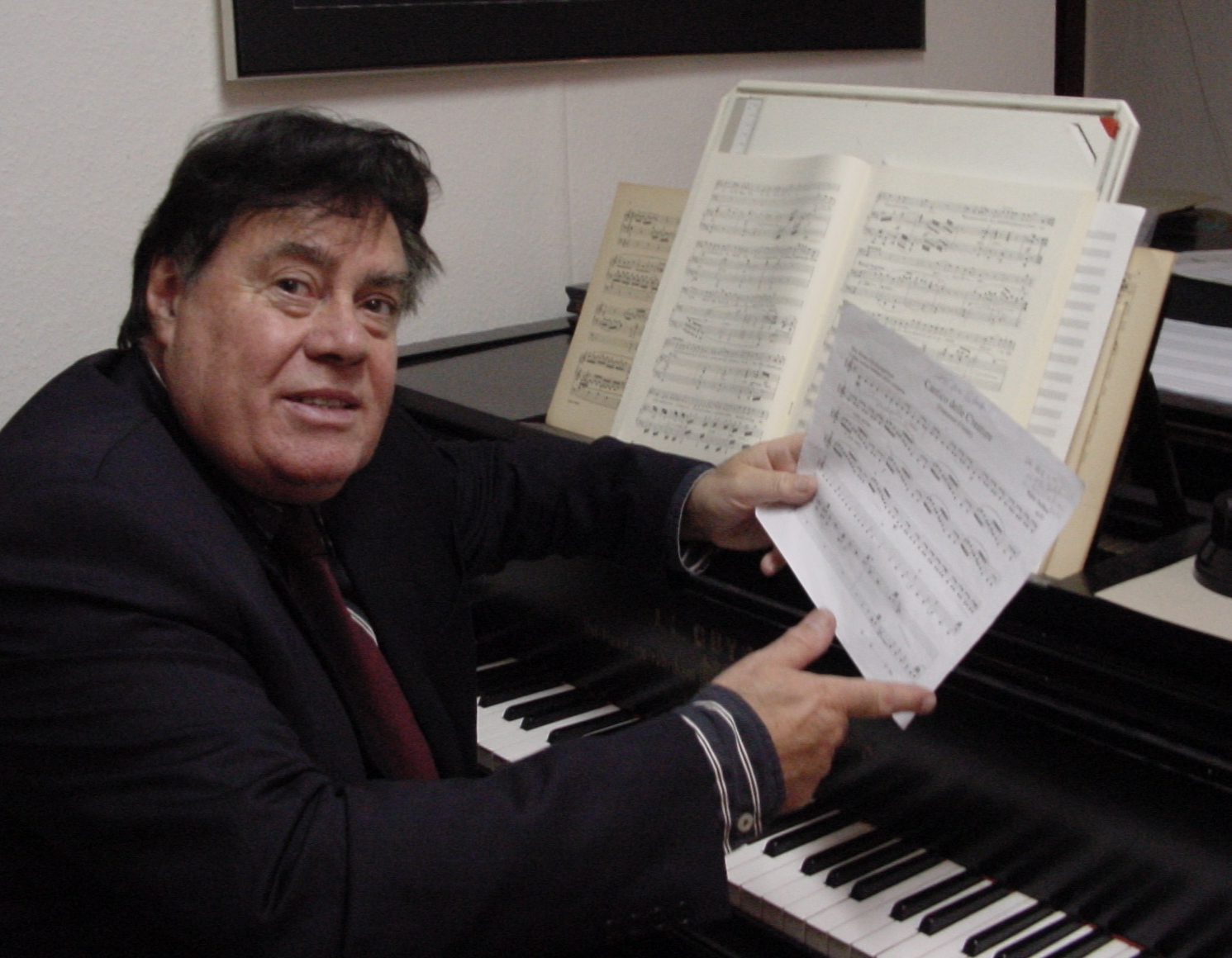
- Walter Steffens in 2005
- Born: 31 October 1934 (age 91); Aachen-Burtscheid, Germany
- Education: Dortmund Conservatory
- Occupation: Composer
- Awards: Freie Akademie der Künste Hamburg; Villa Massimo

Walter Steffens (born 31 October 1934) is a German composer. He is noted for the diversity of his creative works, but has specialised in opera, such as Eli, as well as music inspired by paintings.

== Life ==
The son of a bridge construction engineer, Steffens was born in Aachen-Burtscheid and grew up in Dortmund. His road to music was a bumpy one, especially since his father could not imagine a career in the fine arts as being a respectable way to earn a living. During the Second World War the Ruhrgebiet was being increasingly bombed, and at the age of eight, young Walter was sent, within the Kinderlandverschickung programme — the evacuation of children from war zones to the countryside — to the village of Wollenberg in Baden-Württemberg, and was thus separated from his parents and sister. By the end of the war, the 10-year-old had found a home with his grandparents in Bad Pyrmont.

When the family was re-united again and the family's piano, which had been stored safely in the Sauerland during the war, was returned to their home, the young boy was allowed to accompany his father while singing. Walter was given his first music lessons by a woman from the neighborhood. He received his basic musical education from the music director Max Spindler in Dortmund, and this was supplemented by conducting lessons with Rolf Agop, at the Dortmund Conservatory. In Hamburg he studied composition under Ernst-Gernot Klussmann and the Busoni-pupil Philipp Jarnach as well as music theory under Wilhelm Maler. "I was only able to convince my father about my plans for a musical career after I had finished my school leaving examinations in Münster and passed the entrance examinations for the Hamburg University of Music in 1959", Steffens recalls. He began his teaching career in 1962 at the Hamburg Conservatory.

Eli, Op. 7, after the mystery play by Nelly Sachs, which premiered under the direction of Wilhelm Schüchter in 1967, was commissioned by the City of Dortmund on the occasion of the opening of its new opera house. Under Milk Wood, Op. 14 (Unter dem Milchwald, 1972), based on the "play for voices" by Dylan Thomas, premiered at the Hamburg State Opera in 1973 and staged again by Staatstheater Kassel in 1977 on the occasion of the opening of the documenta 7. His other operas include Der Philosoph, Op. 57 (The Philosopher, Landestheater Detmold 1990), Die Judenbuche, Op. 65 (The Jew's Beech, Opernhaus Dortmund 1992), based on a novel by Annette von Droste-Hülshoff, and Two Cells in Sevilla, Op. 106 on a libretto by his son Marec Béla Steffens (Greenbriar Consortium Houston and Round Top Theatre Forum 2016, on CD: Navona Records 2018).

Steffens has composed numerous works based on paintings (more than 100 single paintings), e.g., Vier Aquarelle nach Paul Klee, Op. 63 (Four Watercolors after Paul Klee). "Mixed concordant working process" (Steffens) is based on the composer's own eight-note scale, with scale-related sound patterns. Impressions of his childhood during the war years and his sadness and grief at all the death and destruction were dealt with by Steffens in his composition Guernica, Op. 32, after the painting by Pablo Picasso. He has received awards from Hamburg, Berlin, and Paris (Cité des Arts).

== Compositions ==
Steffens has noted one essential feature of his musical creativity: "There is always an extra-musical stimulus which has a very intense effect on me, more intense even than only a music-related sensation." He frequently uses literary sources for his compositions—for example works by Nelly Sachs, Ingeborg Bachmann, Clemens Brentano, Dylan Thomas, Federico García Lorca, Friedrich Hölderlin, Juan Ramón Jiménez, Ezra Pound, or Arthur Rimbaud.

"Following the text closely and interpreting it musically, I put it into sounds," Steffens says of his compositional work with literary texts. As an opera composer he tells stories, he experiences, senses, and feels pictorially and in terms of stage settings. In his work with texts by Nelly Sachs he was especially fascinated by the sophistication of her language. Then, when he heard Eli' performed as a radio drama, the message of this mystery play about the suffering of the Jews elicited a deep sense of distress in him. After having visited the author in Stockholm, and after contact with her over period of time, Steffens began working on the libretto himself. The musical expressiveness of this scenic oratorium has been stringently oriented around the text, to pay tribute to the seriousness of the subject matter. In the book Nelly Sachs zu Ehren (In Honor of Nelly Sachs) Steffens gives an account of his work on this opera.

While composing, Steffens maintains an intimate relationship to the instruments and voices he uses. He is intent on projecting "the unalienated sounds of instruments and the human voice in the pure form they have evolved towards over long periods of cultural development and implementation." His own individual system of notation mediates between tonality and atonality, which he says opens up a creative domain "providing for sounds, lines, colors and forms which serve to sensually enhance a desired expression." His style has progressed from an atonal phase, when he was working on the opera Eli and "was unable to endure smiling," to a language of sounds which enable him to express and convey sensibilities, to "make them singable." While Steffens’ occupation with this work by Sachs expanded his spectrum of compositional expression, especially with respect to dramatic components, he considered his second opera Under Milk Wood to be "an opportunity to concentrate on the configuration of comic parts within a basically lyrical style."

In addition to literature, the visual arts also provide Steffens with important sources of inspiration. The book Vom Klang der Bilder, published on the occasion of the exhibition of the same name in the Staatsgalerie Stuttgart from 6 July to 22 September 1985, has an appendix with a list of paintings set to music by Steffens and other composers. Steffens’ orchestral work Guernica, after the painting by Picasso, is a timeless indictment of the terrors of war and violence, expressed in music. The initial silence at the beginning of the work gradually takes on elements of sound, swelling towards a sonorous crescendo, an ominous audio-pictorial intimation of the approaching fighter-bombers, before the viola intones its elegiac theme. Because of its graphic qualities, the score pages of Guernica were included in the 1986 exhibition Linien, Briefe, Notationen (Lines, Letters, Notations) at the Städtischen Galerie Lüdenscheid. The pictures of Ju 52 bombers incorporated into the score, together with the inclusion of background sounds of "extreme brutality," transpose traumatic experiences into visual impressions. In the afterword to the score Steffens writes,

As a child I lived through bombing raids on Dortmund, the menacing drone of bomber formations and the jarring terror of low-level strafing attacks. I know well the patterns of horror in La muerte de Guernica by Pablo Picasso and the poem La Victoire de Guernica by Paul Éluard. In my Elegy for Viola and Orchestra I have tried to recreate in my imagination that haunting feeling—fear, terror, and grief—and to put that all into my music. The suffering is universal and timeless, and so I have acted pluralistically: Everything I could find of historical importance was integrated into the work, to portray the dramatic sense of terror, fear, chaos, hopelessness, sadness and hope.

The musicologist Monika Fink, who has been pursuing the topic of her doctoral thesis Musik nach Bildern (Music after Pictures) for over three decades, writes that she knows of no other composer who has so intensively and consistently dedicated himself to setting pictorial images to music. Under the supervision of Fink a project was initiated at the Department of Music at the University of Innsbruck to develop and maintain a comprehensive website devoted to the subject area “Music after Pictures”. Numerous works by Steffens, especially those from recent years, are listed in this database, e.g., musical compositions on pictures by Peter Paul Rubens, Rembrandt van Rijn, and Emil Schumacher.

== Awards ==
- 1963: Bach Prize of the Free and Hanseatic City of Hamburg (scholarship)
- 1966: Felix Mendelssohn Bartholdy Prize
- 1969: Scholarship from the Cité internationale des arts in Paris
- 1974: Member of the Freie Akademie der Künste Hamburg
- 1977: Annette von Droste-Hülshoff Prize
- 1987 and 1989: Villa Massimo
- 2017: Villa Romana, Florence
