= Symphony: Mathis der Maler =

Symphony by Paul Hindemith

Symphony Mathis der Maler
- by Paul Hindemith
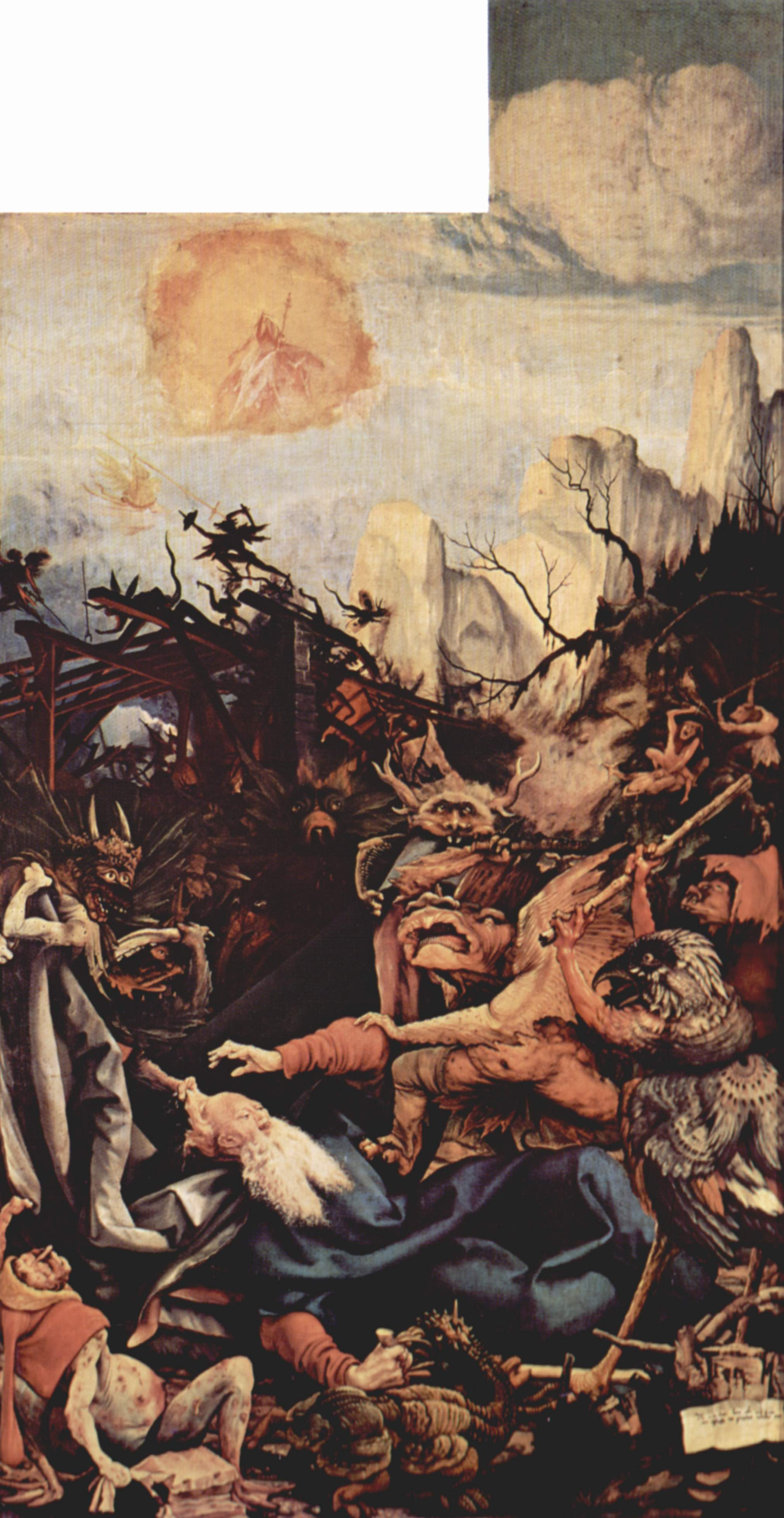
- The Temptation of Saint Anthony, on which the third movement is based
- Related: Mathis der Maler (opera)
- Based on: paintings by Matthias Grünewald
- Composed: 1934
- Performed: 12 March 1934: Berlin
- Movements: three

Symphony: Mathis der Maler (Matthias the Painter) is among the most famous orchestral works of German composer Paul Hindemith. Music from the symphony was incorporated into, or reworked for, Hindemith's opera Mathis der Maler, which concerns the painter Matthias Grünewald (or Neithardt).

== History ==
Hindemith composed the symphony in 1934, while plans for the opera were in their preliminary stages. The conductor Wilhelm Furtwängler asked him at that time for a new work to perform on an upcoming Berlin Philharmonic concert tour, and Hindemith decided to compose symphonic movements that could serve as instrumental interludes in the opera, or be drawn upon or elaborated into various scenes. Furtwängler and the Berlin Philharmonic gave the first performance on 12 March 1934. The first performance outside Germany was given by the New York Philharmonic-Symphony Orchestra in October 1934, conducted by Otto Klemperer. Other early performances include the Leningrad Philharmonic Orchestra in 1936, conducted by Daniel Sternberg.

The symphony was well received at its first performances, but Furtwängler faced severe criticism from the Nazi government for performing the work, given that other Hindemith scores had been denounced by the party as "degenerate" and "Jewish connected." Moreover the opera's plot, which turned on an artist's duty to pursue his vision irrespective of political considerations, was anathema to Nazi ideology. Hindemith completed the full opera by 1935 but because of the political climate it could not be staged in Germany, and only in 1938 was it at last premiered, in Zürich, Switzerland.

== Structure ==
The symphony is in three movements:

1. Engelkonzert (Angelic Concert)
2. Grablegung (Entombment)
3. Versuchung des heiligen Antonius (The Temptation of Saint Anthony)

which correspond to the opera as follows:

- Overture
- Orchestral interlude from the last act
- Orchestral piece reworked and amplified into a visionary scene in Scene 6 of the Opera

Each movement relates to a tableau painted by Grünewald for the Isenheim Altarpiece, an elaborate construction of panels behind panels, which presents different views as its various levels are unfolded. The Concert of Angels is seen when the outer wings of the altarpiece are opened; the Entombment remains always visible at the base of the altarpiece below the wings; and the Bosch-like Temptation of St. Anthony is uncovered when the inner wings are opened. Grünewald juxtaposed religious serenity with depictions of suffering grounded in the tensions that wracked 16th century Germany during the peasant uprising prompted by the Reformation. These contrasts are faithfully mirrored in Hindemith's score, which offers at once a portrait of a turbulent historical era and an urgent contemporary statement born amid political strife.

Hindemith's principle of harmonic fluctuation is readily apparent in this work. For example, the second movement opens on a perfect fifth sonority and gradually introduces more dissonant pitches. The result is an implied tonal center, although in much of his harmony the functional tonality of tradition plays no governing role.

== List of themes ==
=== I. Engelkonzert ===
Introduction: "Es sungen drei Engel" (folk song) m. 9–16

Theme 1 m. 39–47

Theme 2 m. 98–106

Theme 3 m. 135–142

Three chord motive m. 54

=== II. Grablegung ===
Theme 1 m. 1–4

Theme 2 m. 16–20

=== III. Versuchung des heiligen Antonius ===
Introduction m. 1–3

Theme 1 m. 19–26

Theme 2 m. 87–102

Descending motive m. 141–142

Slow section theme m. 195–199

"Lauda Sion Salvatorem" (plain chant) m. 468–480

"Alleluia" m. 520–525

== Scoring and duration ==
The symphony is scored for these instruments: piccolo, 2 flutes, 2 oboes, 2 clarinets, 2 bassoons, 4 horns, 2 trumpets, 3 trombones, tuba, timpani, 3 percussion, strings. Duration: 25 minutes in three movements (with pauses).
