= Bernd Aldenhoff =

German opera singer

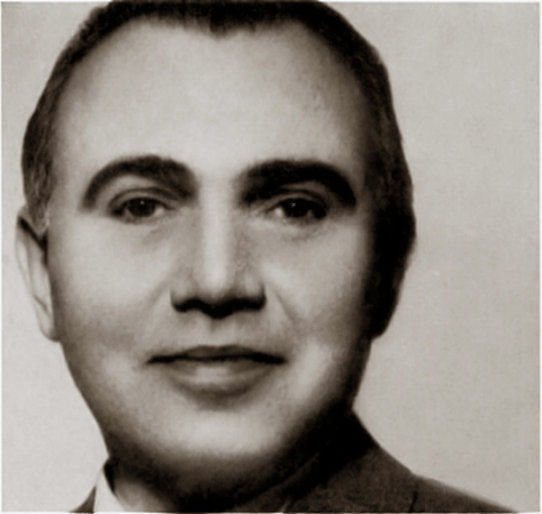
- Born: 14 June 1908; Duisburg
- Died: 8 October 1959 (aged 51); München
- Occupation: Heldentenor
- Years active: 1938–1957

Bernd Aldenhoff (14 June 1908, in Duisburg – 8 October 1959, in München) was a German heldentenor.

== Career ==
He was born in 1908 in Duisburg, and raised in an orphanage in the Rhineland. Despite his humble beginnings, he managed to secure an engagement in the Cologne Opera chorus. While in Cologne he continued his vocal studies with a Professor Lenz, and was eventually promoted to soloist in the Cologne theater.

After engagements in Darmstadt and Erfurt, he first came to national prominence at the Deutsche Oper am Rhein, Düsseldorf, where he sang from 1938 to 1944. During this period he made several guest appearances at the Oper Frankfurt, where he made a strong impression in the Verdi spinto roles of Manrico and Riccardo.

During the war he sang in a number of German provincial houses, and from 1944 to 1952 he was a member of the Dresden Semperoper, where he developed into a Heldentenor. He first appeared at the Bayreuth Festspielhaus in 1951 as Siegfried in "Der Ring des Nibelungen" under both Knappertsbusch and Karajan, and returned there to repeat the role several times until 1957.

He appeared in Bavarian State Opera Munich between 1950 and 1958 in operas by Weber and Verdi, and in Richard Strauss's Die ägyptische Helena, and sang Siegfried in Götterdämmerung at Covent Garden in 1957. He made his Met debut as Tannhäuser, and also appeared at La Scala, the Paris Opéra and the Opernhaus Zürich.

Knappertsbusch called him the most "human Heldentenor" of his time. As an interpreter, he has been called the most precise and sensitive Wagner tenor of his generation although some have found his singing on complete recordings of Weber and Wagner operas in the early 1950s rough and harsh.

He died in Munich on 8 October 1959 at the peak of his career from food poisoning.

== Roles ==
- d’Albert: "Tiefland", Pedro
- Beethoven: "Fidelio", Florestan
- Flotow: "Martha", Lyonel
- Kienzl: "Der Evangelimann", Matthias
- Offenbach: "Hoffmanns Erzählungen", Hoffmann
- Pfitzner: "Der arme Heinrich", Heinrich
- Puccini: "La Bohème", Rudolfo
- Puccini "Madame Butterfly", Pinkerton
- Strauss: "Salome", Herodes
- Strauss: "Elektra", Ägisth
- Strauss: "Ariadne auf Naxos", Bacchus
- Strauss: "Arabella", Matteo
- Strauss: "Die ägyptische Helena", Menelaos
- Verdi: "Il Trovatore", Manrico
- Verdi: "Un ballo in maschera", Riccardo
- Verdi: "Otello", Otello
- Wagner: "Der fliegende Holländer", Erik
- Wagner: "Tannhäuser", Tannhäuser
- Wagner: "Lohengrin", Lohengrin
- Wagner: "Meistersinger von Nürnberg", Walther von Stolzing
- Wagner: "Tristan und Isolde", Tristan
- Wagner: "Walküre", Siegmund
- Wagner: "Siegfried", Siegfried
- Wagner: "Götterdämmerung", Siegfried
- Wagner: "Parsifal", Parsifal
- Wagner (Siegfried) "Der Heidenkönig", Radoma
- Wagner-Régeny: "Der Günstling", Fabiano
- Weber: "Der Freischütz", Max

== Discography ==
- D'Albert: Tiefland – Orchestra of the NDR, Rudolf Alberth, 1953
- Beethoven: Ninth Symphony – Gewandhausorchester Leipzig, Hermann Abendroth, 1950
- Beethoven: Fidelio – Staatskapelle Dresden, Joseph Keilberth, 1948
- Pfitzner: Die Rose vom Liebesgarten – Symphonieorchester of the Bayerische Rundfunk, Robert Heger, 1953
- Strauss: Salome – Staatskapelle Dresden, Joseph Keilberth, 1948
- Strauss: Elektra – Bayerische Staatsoper, Hans Knappertsbusch 1956
- Strauss: Die ägyptische Helena – Bayerische Staatsoper, Joseph Keilberth, 1956
- Wagner: Der fliegende Holländer – Orchester of the NDR, Wilhelm Schüchter, 1951
- Wagner: Die Meistersinger von Nürnberg – Sächsische Staatskapelle Dresden, Rudolf Kempe, 1951
- Wagner: Siegfried – Bayreuther Festspiele, Herbert von Karajan, 1951
- Wagner: Siegfried – Bayreuther Festspiele, Joseph Keilberth, 1952
- Wagner: Siegfried – Bayreuther Festspiele, Hans Knappertsbusch 1957
- Wagner: Siegfried – Opernhaus Zürich, Robert F. Denzler 1959
- Wagner: Götterdämmerung – Bayreuther Festspiele, Knappertsbusch, 1951
- Wagner: Götterdämmerung – Bayerische Staatsoper, Hans Knappertsbusch, 1955
- Wagner: Parsifal – Sinfonieorchester of the Kölner Rundfunk, Richard Kraus, 1949
- Weber: Der Freischütz – Sächsischer Staatskapelle Dresden, Rudolf Kempe, 1949
- Lebendige Vergangenheit – Bernd Aldenhoff (Aufnahmen 1946–1949)
- Waldoper Zoppot – Das Bayreuth des Nordens und seine Sänger
- "A Portrait of Marianne Schech" - Highlights of the 2. act Parsifal, Orchester der Bayerischen Staatsoper, Eugen Jochum
- "Georg Hann Arias 1942-43 Recordings" - Highlights of Rheingold
- "Leonie Rysanek sings Beethoven/Wagner/Verdi" - Highlights of Aida
- "Josef Metternich - Rare and Unreleased Recordings" - Highlights of Otello

== Audio examples ==
- Richard Wagner: 2. Act Götterdämmerung

Brünnhilde: Astrid Varnay; Siegfried: Bernd Aldenhoff; Hagen: Ludwig Weber; Alberich: Heinrich Pflanzl; Gunther: Hermann Uhde; Gutrune: Martha Mödl; Dirigent: Hans Knappertsbusch Festspielhaus; Bayreuth, 04. August 1951

- Richard Wagner: Schmiedelied aus 1. Act Siegfried

Siegfried: Bernd Aldenhoff; Mime: Paul Kuën; Dirigent: Joseph Keilberth; Festspielhaus Bayreuth, 14. August 1952

- Richard Wagner, Siegfried 1. Act: „He, Mime! Geschwind! Wie heißt das Schwert?“

Siegfried: Bernd Aldenhoff; Mime: Paul Kuën; Dirigent: Joseph Keilberth; Festspielhaus Bayreuth, 14. August 1952

- Richard Wagner, Siegfried 1. Act: „Hoho! Hoho! Hohei!“

Siegfried: Bernd Aldenhoff; Mime: Paul Kuën; Dirigent: Joseph Keilberth; Festspielhaus Bayreuth, 14. August 1952

- Richard Wagner: Der fliegende Holländer - 1. act
- Richard Wagner: Der fliegende Holländer - 2. act
- Richard Wagner: Der fliegende Holländer - 3. act

Daland: Kurt Böhme, Senta: Helene Werth, Erik: Bernd Aldenhoff, Mary: Res Fischer, Steuermann: Helmut Krebs, Holländer: Hans Hotter - Chor und Sinfonieorchester des Norddeutschen Rundfunks - Wilhelm Schüchter - Hamburg 1951
