= Eli (opera) =

Opera by Walter Steffens, 1966

- Opera by Walter Steffens
- Language: German
- Based on: Play by Nelly Sachs
- Premiere: 1967; Opernhaus Dortmund

Eli, Op. 7, is a German-language opera in three acts with music by Walter Steffens to a libretto based on a play by Nelly Sachs. The world premiere was in 1967 at the Opernhaus Dortmund.

== History ==
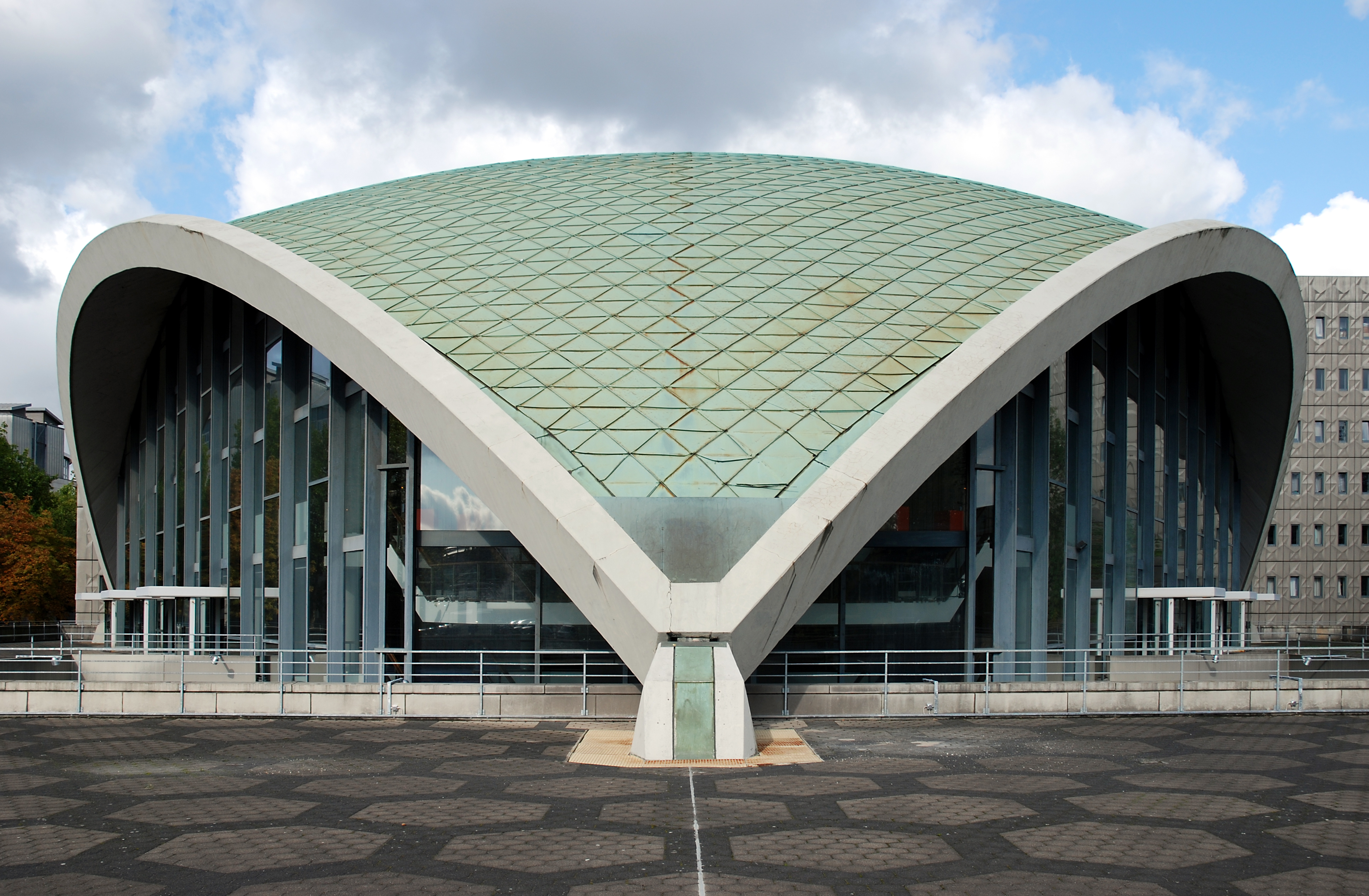
Opernhaus Dortmund

Eli was a commission from the city of Dortmund as the first world premiere to be performed at the new Opernhaus Dortmund which was inaugurated in 1966. The composer wrote the libretto for the opera in three acts (12 scenes) based on a 1943 mystery play by Nelly Sachs. The city of Dortmund awards a literature prize in her name, the Nelly Sachs Prize. Her play was first entitled Eli: Ein Legendenspiel vom Leiden Israels (Eli: A mystery play of the sufferings of Israel), later changed to Eli: Ein Mysterienspiel ... It was premiered by Theater Dortmund on 14 March 1962. The opera was published by Bärenreiter.

The action is in single episodes, without a plot. It is set in a Polish village right after World War II, where a Jewish boy, Eli, was slain by a German soldier during a pogrom, and is remembered in various ways. Walter Steffens, a resident of Dortmund, worked on the composition from 1964 to 1966.

The world premiere of the opera was on 5 March 1967 in the Opernhaus Dortmund, directed by Hans Hartleb, with Hainer Hill as designer of stage and costumes, and Wilhelm Schüchter conducting.

== Roles ==
The first performance was at the Opernhaus Dortmund on 5 March 1967, conducted by Wilhelm Schüchter. Many singers take more than one role:

Roles, voice types, premiere cast
Role	Voice type	Performer
Michael	heldenbaritone	
A Baker / A Woman / An Old Woman	dramatic soprano	
Ester / The Mother	coloratura soprano	
A Young Woman	coloratura soprano	
A Girl / A Woman	soprano	
Ester / The Mother	coloratura soprano	
A Washing Woman	dramatic contralto	
Second Tree	contralto	
Jossele / First Voice / Scherenschleifer / Beggar / A Man	high lyric tenor	Alfred Vökt
Ein Verwachsener	tenor	
Mendel	tenor	
First Bricklayer / Voice of a Star / A Chimney	tenor	
The Old Bricklayer / A Man / The Man With the Mirror Glass / A Rabbi	serious bass-baritone	
Second Bricklayer	baritone	
A Being / A Baker	low bass	
Samuel	silent role	
Second Voice / A Blind Girl / A Carpenter / A Child / A Postman / First Tree / A Doctor / A Voice	speaking roles	
Brick layers / Praying Group / Voice from the Chimney / Voices of the Fingers / Voice of the Lecturer's Finger / Choir in the orchestra	choir	
Rough Man's Voice / Hissing Sounds / A Finger / A Long Bony Finger / Voice of the Lecturer's Finger	tape	

== Reception ==
A reviewer from Süddeutsche Zeitung noted that Steffens transports the poetry to a different level of emotional intensity. He described the vocal and instrumental lines as expressive and melodic ("Expressiv-melodische Diktion"), and the electro-acoustic parts as unreal voices.
