= Daniel Sternberg =

American classical composer

Daniel Arie Sternberg (29 March 1913 – 26 August 2000) was a Polish conductor, pianist, composer, and educator. He lived and worked in Central and Eastern Europe until 1939, when he emigrated to the United States to escape World War II.

== Biography ==
Sternberg was born on 29 March 1913 in Lemberg, Austria-Hungary. The son of music-loving parents, he began piano lessons at age five and added the cello. He graduated at the top of his class from the Vienna Conservatory, where he studied conducting. Upon graduation, he became assistant conductor (under Fritz Stiedry) of the Leningrad Opera and the Leningrad Philharmonic Orchestra. It was in Leningrad, in 1935, that Sternberg first met cellist Lev Aronson, whom he recommended for the post of principal cellist. It was also in Leningrad, in 1936, that he conducted the first performance outside Germany of Paul Hindemith's Mathis der Maler symphony. After serving as music director of the Tbilisi State Symphony Orchestra, he lived in Vienna, Riga, and Stockholm.

After the German invasion of Poland ignited World War II in the fall of 1939, Sternberg and his wife, the Romanian-born Felicitas Gobineau Sternberg, emigrated to the United States. Sternberg lived for a year in New York and then moved to Dallas, Texas, where he became head of the piano department and conductor of chorus and opera at the Hockaday Institute of Music (a short-lived division of the Hockaday School that operated only from 1937 to 1946). He joined the Baylor University School of Music in 1942 and was made its chair the following year. Shortly afterward he was given the newly created title of Dean. Sternberg founded the Baylor Symphony in 1944 and conducted it until he retired from teaching in 1980. In Waco, he founded the Waco Symphony in 1962 and conducted it until 1987. When Lev Aronson came to the United States in 1948, he became principal cellist of the Dallas Symphony for almost twenty years, teacher of Lynn Harrell, Ralph Kirshbaum, and other prominent American cellists, and a close friend and ally of Sternberg, who lured him onto the Baylor faculty.

As a composer, Sternberg won a film music prize in Austria, a first prize for vocal composition from the Texas Federation of Music Clubs, and the Dallas Symphony Orchestra's Harold J. Abrams Memorial Award for his Concert Overture. In August 2009, the International Percy Grainger Society awarded him posthumously its 50th and final Grainger Medallion. An accomplished linguist, he was fluent in several languages, and he created many opera translations, often collaborating with his wife, who was active as an opera director.

Sternberg died in Waco, Texas, on 26 August 2000.
