= Liselotte Hammes =

German operatic soprano (born 1933)

- Born: 1933 (age 92–93); Siegburg, North Rhine-Westphalia, Germany
- Education: Musikhochschule Köln
- Occupations: Operatic soprano; Voice teacher
- Organizations: Cologne Opera; Musikhochschule Köln

Liselotte Hammes (born 1933) is a German operatic soprano and academic voice teacher. While based at the Cologne Opera, she performed internationally. One of her signature roles is Sophie in Der Rosenkavalier by Richard Strauss, which she performed at the Glyndebourne Festival, among other European opera houses.

== Career ==
Hammes was born in Siegburg, probably in 1933. She studied at the Musikhochschule Köln, first piano, then voice.

In 1957, she made her debut at the Cologne Opera, as Amor in Gluck's Orfeo ed Euridice. She remained a member of the opera house until 1968 when she married, but still appeared there as a guest until the mid-1970s.

She appeared as a guest in Germany and internationally, at the Staatsoper Stuttgart, the Hamburgische Staatsoper, the Deutsche Oper Berlin, the Teatro Verdi di Trieste and the Teatro San Carlo in Naples in 1962, at La Fenice and the Teatro Nacional de São Carlos in Lisbon in 1964 and 1967, at La Scala in Milan and the Rome Opera in 1968, and at the Paris Opera in 1971. She appeared as Sophie in Der Rosenkavalier by Richard Strauss for the opening performance of the Opernhaus Dortmund on 3 March 1966, alongside Teresa Żylis-Gara in the title role, Elisabeth Grümmer as the Marschallin, and Kurt Böhme as Ochs, conducted by Wilhelm Schüchter. She also performed the role at the 1965 Glyndebourne Festival in a production that was recorded. Conducted by John Pritchard, she sang again with Żylis-Gara, this time with Montserrat Caballé as the Marschallin and Otto Edelmann as Ochs.

Her repertoire of about 70 roles included the major roles of Susanna in Mozart's Le nozze di Figaro, both Papagena and Pamina in his Die Zauberflöte, Marzelline in Beethoven's Fidelio, Mimì in Puccini's La bohème and the title role in his Manon Lescaut, Nedda in Leoncavallo's Pagliacci, Marie in Smetana's Die verkaufte Braut and Ann Truelove in Stravinsky's The Rake's Progress.

Hammes also appeared as a concert singer. In 1973, she turned to teaching, first in Bonn and Siegburg, and from 1985 was a professor at the Musikhochschule Köln.

== Recording ==
In 1966, she recorded the role of Zdenka in Arabella by Richard Strauss live at La Fenice in Venice, alongside Melitta Muszely in the title role and with Meinhard von Zallinger as conductor.
