= Old Synagogue (Dortmund) =

Synagogue in Dortmund, North Rhine-Westfalia, Germany

- German: Alte Synagoge
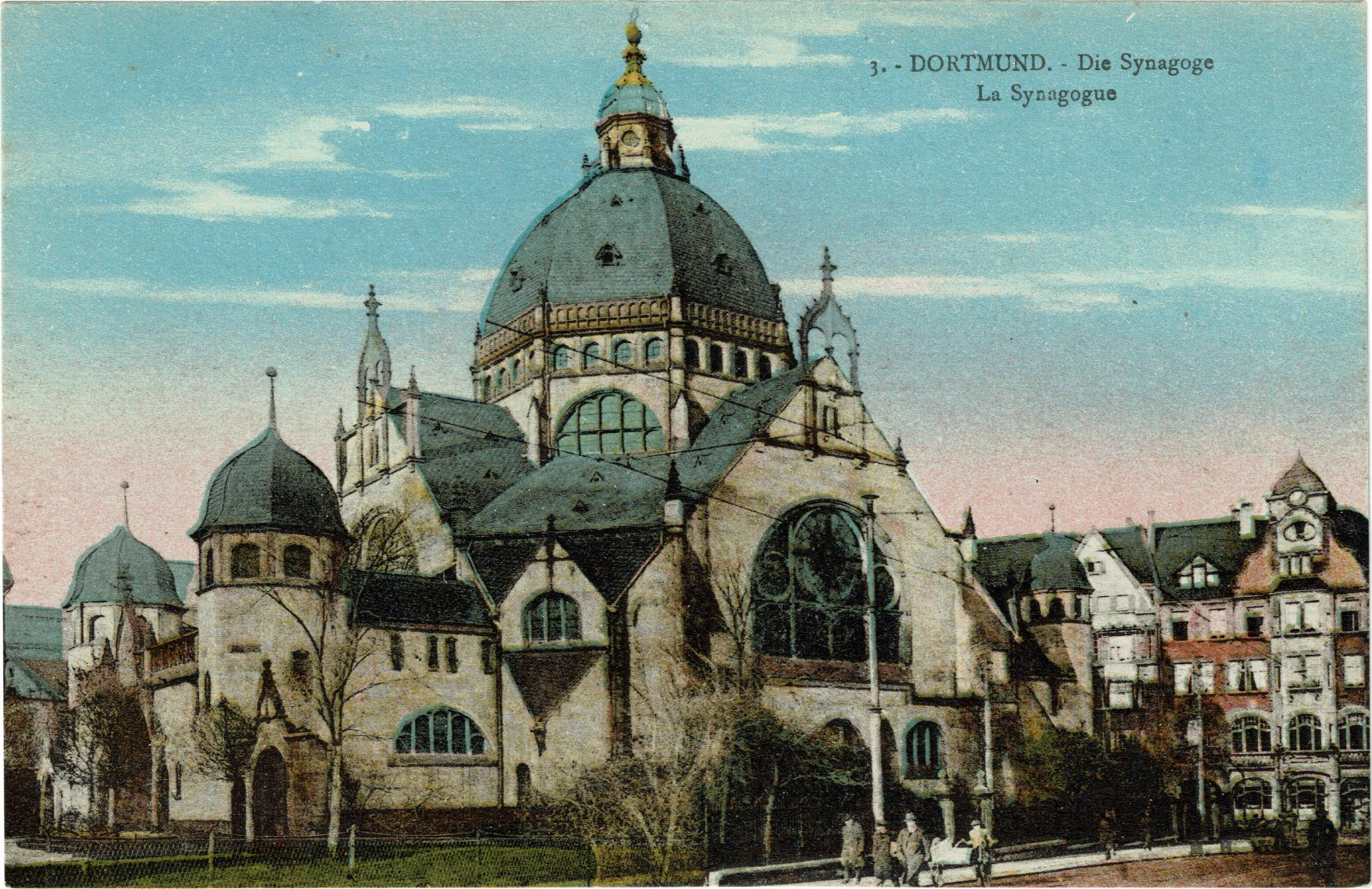
- Postcard of the former synagogue, c. 1925

- Location of the destroyed synagogue in North Rhine-Westphalia

Religion
- Affiliation: Judaism (former)
- Ecclesiastical or organizational status: Synagogue (1900–1933)
- Status: Destroyed

Location
- Location: Dortmund, North Rhine-Westphalia
- Country: Germany
- Interactive map of Old Synagogue
- Coordinates: 51°30′39″N 7°27′42″E

Architecture
- Completed: 1900
- Demolished: December 1938; (following Kristallnacht)
- Capacity: 1,300 seats

The Old Synagogue (German: Alte Synagoge) was a former Jewish congregation and synagogue, located in Dortmund, in the state of North Rhine-Westphalia, Germany. Completed in 1900, the synagogue was abandoned in 1933 and demolished in 1938. Prior to its abandonment, the synagogue was the largest synagogue and cultural center of the Jewish community in Dortmund.

== History ==
The synagogue was opened in 1900. With a capacity of 1,300 seats it was one of the largest Jewish houses of worship in Germany.

After the Nazi Party gained power in 1933, the local government forced the Jewish community to sell the property and decided to demolish the synagogue. The proceeds from the sale were seized by the Nazi regime. Demolition works began a few weeks before the Kristallnacht and were finished in December 1938.

In 1958–1965 the new Opernhaus Dortmund was built on the site where the synagogue once stood. Since 1998 the forecourt is officially known as Platz der Alten Synagoge ("Place of the Old Synagogue") and a memorial stone as well as a memorial plaque was erected.

== See also ==
- History of the Jews in Germany
- List of synagogues in Germany (in German)
