= Dortmunder Philharmoniker =

German symphony orchestra

- Orchestra
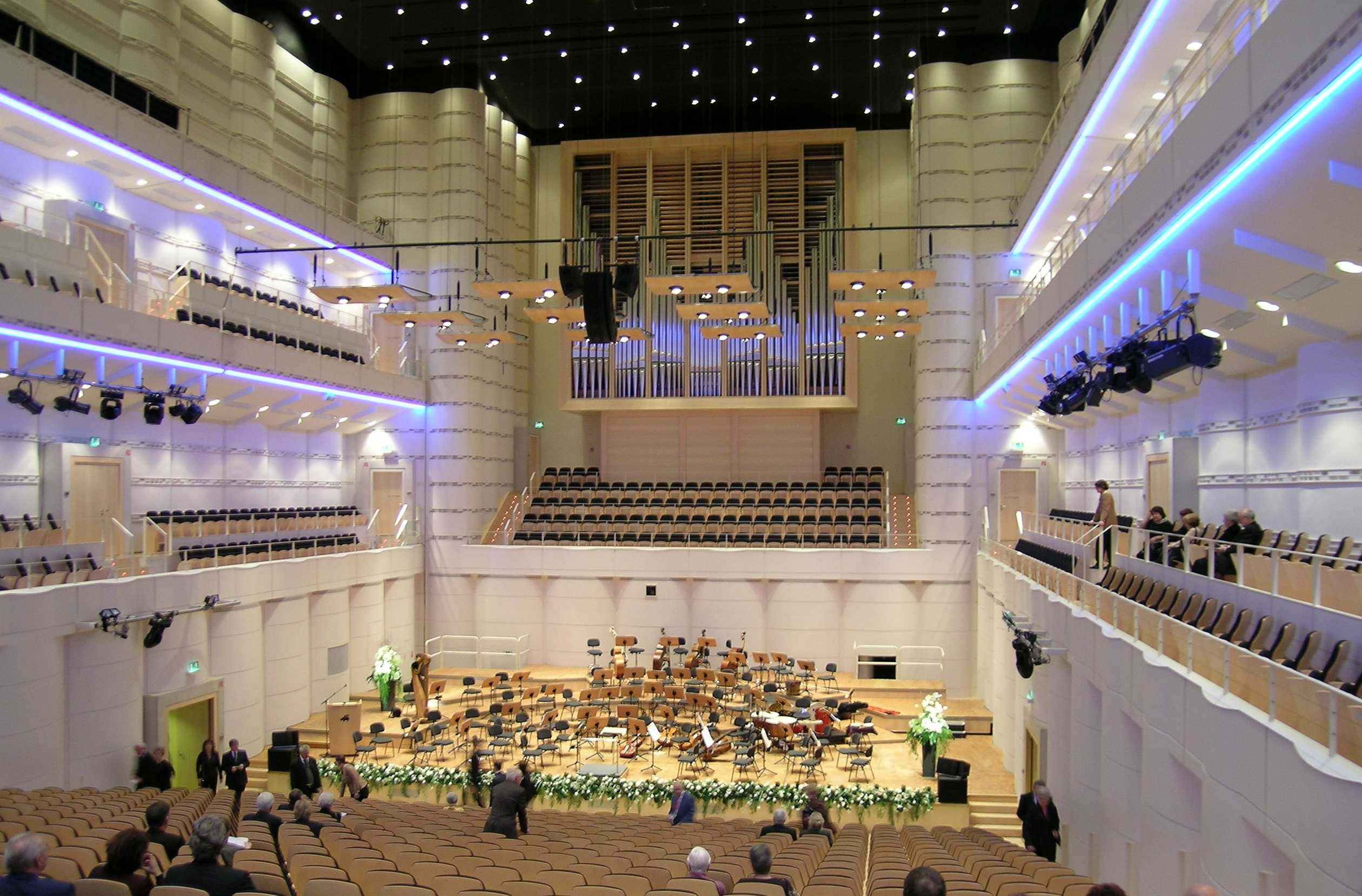
- Konzerthaus Dortmund
- Former name: Philharmonisches Orchester Dortmund
- Founded: 1887
- Location: Dortmund, Germany
- Concert hall: Opernhaus Dortmund; Konzerthaus Dortmund
- Principal conductor: Jordan de Souza
- Website: Homepage

The Dortmunder Philharmoniker (Dortmund Philharmonic) is a German symphony orchestra based in Dortmund. The orchestra of the Theater Dortmund performs opera in the Opernhaus Dortmund and concerts in the Konzerthaus Dortmund.

== History ==
The orchestra was founded as an orchestral society (Orchesterverein) in 1764. The orchestra played at different locations until the Stadttheater was opened in 1904.

The name of the orchestra changed with organisational and functional changes, including Hüttner Kapelle, Städtisches Orchester (Orchestra of the city), Philharmonisches Orchester der Stadt Dortmund, Philharmonisches Orchester Dortmund, until its current name, the Dortmunder Philharmoniker. The concert venue after World War II was the Kleine Westfalenhalle. In 1966, they opened the new opera house Opernhaus Dortmund with a performance of Der Rosenkavalier, conducted by Wilhelm Schüchter. Its hall was also used for symphony concerts until 2002, when the Konzerthaus Dortmund opened as the orchestra's home.

== Music ==
The Dortmunder Philharmiker perform regular concerts and also concerts for young listeners, Familienkonzerte (family concerts) for people from five years up, and Konzerte für junge Leute (concerts for young people).

In 2010, the orchestra participated in the Festival Klangvocal with music of Hans Werner Henze and Richard Wagner. Henze's Symphony No. 5, Wagner's Wesendonck Lieder in Henze's version, and the first act of Die Walküre were performed with soloists Angela Denoke and Stig Andersen, conducted by Jac van Steen. This was part of a project begun in 2009 to perform the complete symphonies of Henze (whose mother was born in nearby Witten).

The current principal conductor of the orchestra is Jordan de Souza, as of 1 August 2025.

The Dortmunder Philharmoniker has commercially recorded works of Antonín Dvořák, including his Symphony No. 6 and concert overtures.

== Principal conductors ==
- Georg Hüttner (1887–1919)
- Wilhelm Sieben (1920–1951)
- Rolf Agop (1952–1962)
- Wilhelm Schüchter (1963–1974)
- Marek Janowski (1975–1979)
- Hans Wallat (1980–1985)
- Klaus Weise (1985–1990)
- Moshe Atzmon (1991–1994)
- Anton Marik (1996–2000)
- Arthur Fagen (2002–2007)
- Jac van Steen (2008–2013)
- Gabriel Feltz (2013–2025)
- Jordan de Souza (2025–present)
