= Wallenberg (opera) =

2001 opera by Erkki-Sven Tüür

Wallenberg is an opera by the Estonian composer Erkki-Sven Tüür to a libretto by Lutz Hübner. The plot is developed from events in Raoul Wallenberg's personal life. The opera premiered at the Opernhaus Dortmund on May 5, 2001. It premiered at the Estonian National Opera on June 1, 2007, directed by Dmitry Bertman.

== Roles ==
Roles, voice types, premiere cast
Role	Voice type	Premiere cast, 5 May 2001 Conductor: Alexander Rumpf
Raoul Wallenberg, Swedish diplomat, rescuer tens of thousands Jews	bass-baritone	Hannu Niemelä
Adolf Eichmann, German Nazi SS-Obersturmbannführer	bass	Thomas Mehnert
Wallenberg second	tenor	Hannes Brock
Ronald Reagan, the 40th President of the United States	baritone	Andreas Becker
Jacob Wallenberg, Swedish banker, a member of the Wallenberg family	tenor	Michael-Silvan Scheel
American General	bass-bariton	Bernhard Modes
American Soldier	baritone	Johannes Knecht
German Officer	baritone	Andreas Becker
The First Survivor	mezzo-soprano	Margarita Malevska
The Second Survivor	tenor	Jae-Seok Lee
The Third Survivor	bass	Hanno Kreft
The First Guest	tenor	Michael-Silvan Scheel
The Second Guest	bass-baritone	Bernhard Modes
The Third Guest	baritone	Hans-Werner Trede
The First Diplomat	soprano	Gundula Schneider
The Second Diplomat	mezzo-soprano	Andrea Rieche
The Third Diplomat	contralto	Karin Robben
Dame	mezzo-soprano	Susan Benkin
Woman	soprano	Barbara Dobrzanska
The First Russian Officer	tenor	Martin Müller-Görgner
The Second Russian Officer	tenor	Darius Scheliga
The Three Gulag Prisoners	bariton, bass, bariton	Lothar Becher; Thomas Günzler; Georg Kirketerp
Jews, guests, Gulag's prisoners	Choir	Choir of Theater Dortmund

== Synopsis ==
=== Act 1 ===
1. Prologue. Nameless Voices asked questions — after Wallenberg's deeds and his fate: "Do we doing honour a living person or a dead person?"

2. The Conference I.

Sweden in 1944. A reception. Three guests whispering about the professional misses of the young Wallenberg. But three diplomats give his life new meaning. You go to entrust your with the mission to Hungary, to save "as many Jews as possible". The warnings of a lady, not to be exploited for foreign targets, can not stop Wallenberg. After initial hesitation, he accepts the order.

3. Railway Station I.

Hungary 1944. Wallenberg must helplessly watch as running a German officers and his men the order of the Nazi regime, "thousands of Jews every day ..."

4. The Plan I

Wallenberg takes a promising tactic: Swedish protective passports "Will make Jews like Sweden" and keep them from being deported.

5. Railway Station II

Wallenberg again meets the German officer. He manages to rescue some people from the brutality of the Nazis. "Passport hits gun"

6. The rescued.

A group of those saved by Wallenberg shows the fragility of their destiny in mind: "Life is not just being more than dead." Wallenberg realizes that there is every life is individual and very expensive.

7. The Plan II

Wallenberg is struggling with self-reproach: "Not enough! I have not acted enough!" He decides to face the evil.

8. Eichmann I.

Wallenberg meets Adolf Eichmann. He confronts him with the goal of his saving deeds. But Eichmann is a bureaucrat and behaves like a gentleman. With relish, he shows the Wallenberg's limits of its possibilities in mind. And even the diplomat start to doubt the mission of Wallenberg. This time he runs away.

9. Station III.

Wallenberg throws himself into the work. But an encounter with a woman he has rescued leaves him utterly disappointed in the meaning of his deeds. She returns her protective passport to Wallenberg — so unbearably she feels the guilt to have survived "by chance".

10. The Plan III.

Wallenberg gets in panic about the immensity of his task. Once again, he encounters a woman who advises him to pause and reflect on it.

11. The death march.

Hungary, January 1945 — "And He made me pass by them round about, and lo! they were exceedingly many on the surface of the valley, and lo! they were exceedingly dry." Old Testament, Book of Ezekiel (37, 2).

The last time Eichmann demonstrates his superiority. The war ends. Wallenberg hopes for a fresh start. But at the moment of the freeing appear two Russian soldiers. They summon Raoul Wallenberg for the questioning ...

=== Act 2 ===
12. SMERSH.

Moscow 1945. Wallenberg has got into the clutches of SMERSH, the Russian counter-intelligence. He is held prisoner in the infamous Moscow state prison Lubjanka. Two Russian officers denied knowing the whereabouts of Wallenberg: "We do not have him!"

13. The Conference II

Three diplomats visited Wallenberg. But instead of freeing him, they tell him about his new mission: "Only half of the war is now won". As a hero he was caught in the Cold War and more useful than a free man.

14. Gulag I.

Kolyma, uncertain time. Wallenberg is subjected to a brutal interrogation. Meanwhile, the inmates of the Gulag tell each other about their fate and the arbitrariness of the judicial authorities. There are circulating rumors contradictory: "The Swede is alive. The Swede is dead."

15. Gulag II

Three Gulag prisoners believes Wallenberg recognizable as one of their fellow prisoners. His survival also maintains their hope. But Wallenberg not remember — neither of his time in the camp, even to his own identity. "There is a hole in my head". The other prisoners reacted with aggression to Wallenberg refusal to accept his role as savior.

Intermezzo.

Traces of Wallenberg are erased.

16. The struggle.

From nothing appears Wallenberg 2, a masterful bugbear of the acts complained of by Wallenberg, "I'm your hero, you will not get rid of me."

17. Eichmann II

Eichmann is preparing for the penalty. For the last time he taunted Wallenberg: While Eichmann was granted was "clean finish", Wallenberg would fail to be granted such a death. Eichmann is hanged.

18. The conference III.

Wallenberg hopes explanations to find about his destiny with three diplomats. But these dismiss his doubts about the sense of the history as "child questions". Wallenberg is silent. But his "For which?" does not remain in entirety unanswered. Two survivors remember their rescue.

19. Wallenberg circus.

Future generations takes the heritage of Raoul Wallenberg. The public sings praises of heroism. And Ronald Reagan appoints him as an honorary citizen of the United States. Wallenberg 2 takes the honors of the crowd with pride: "No trace of a doubt!"

The voice of a woman remembers the dead.

== Awards ==
- Cultural Prize of the Republic of Estonia
- Annual Award of Estonian Theatre in the category of musical stagings.
