= Gliwice Theatre =

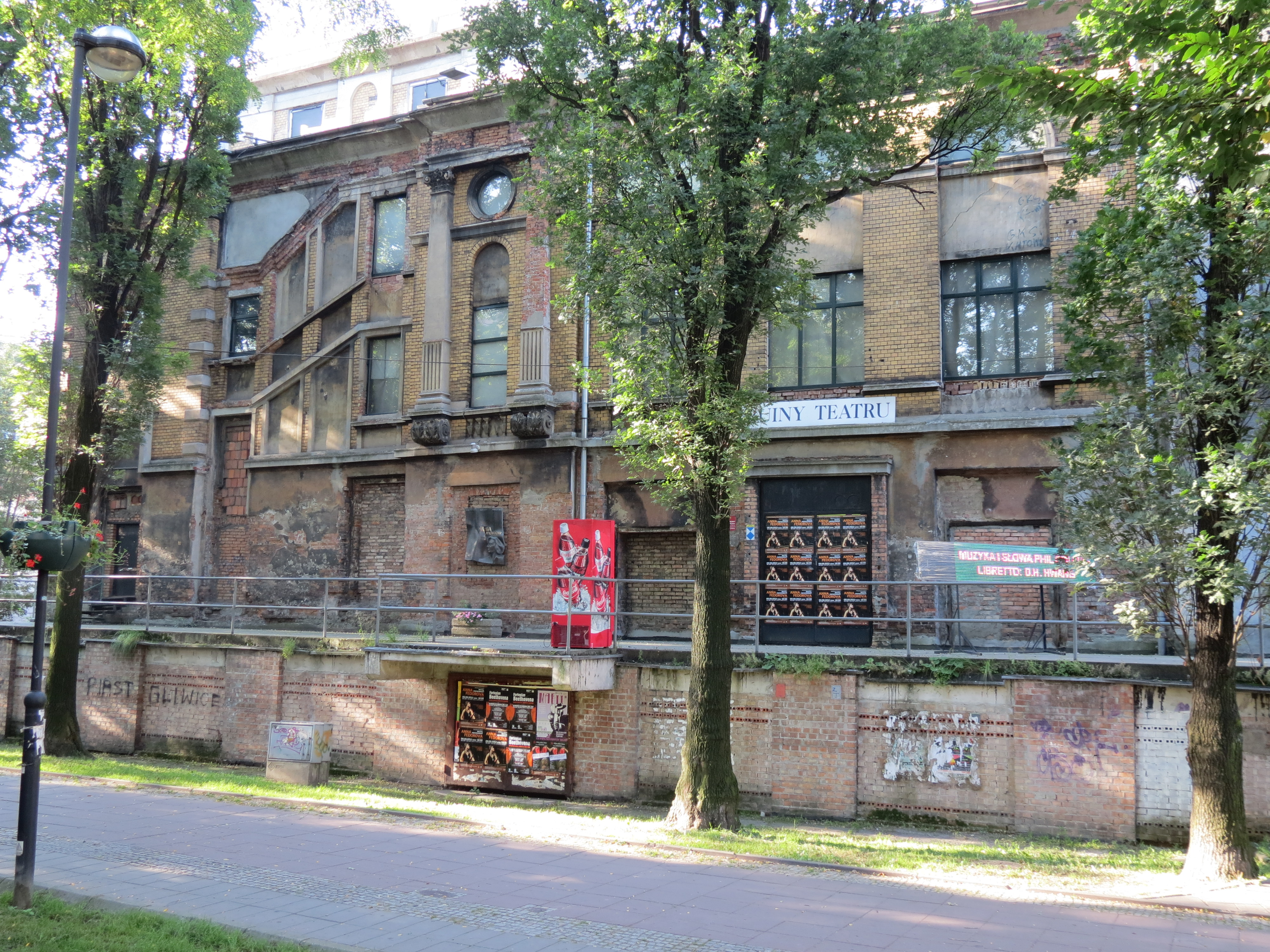
The ruins of the city theatre

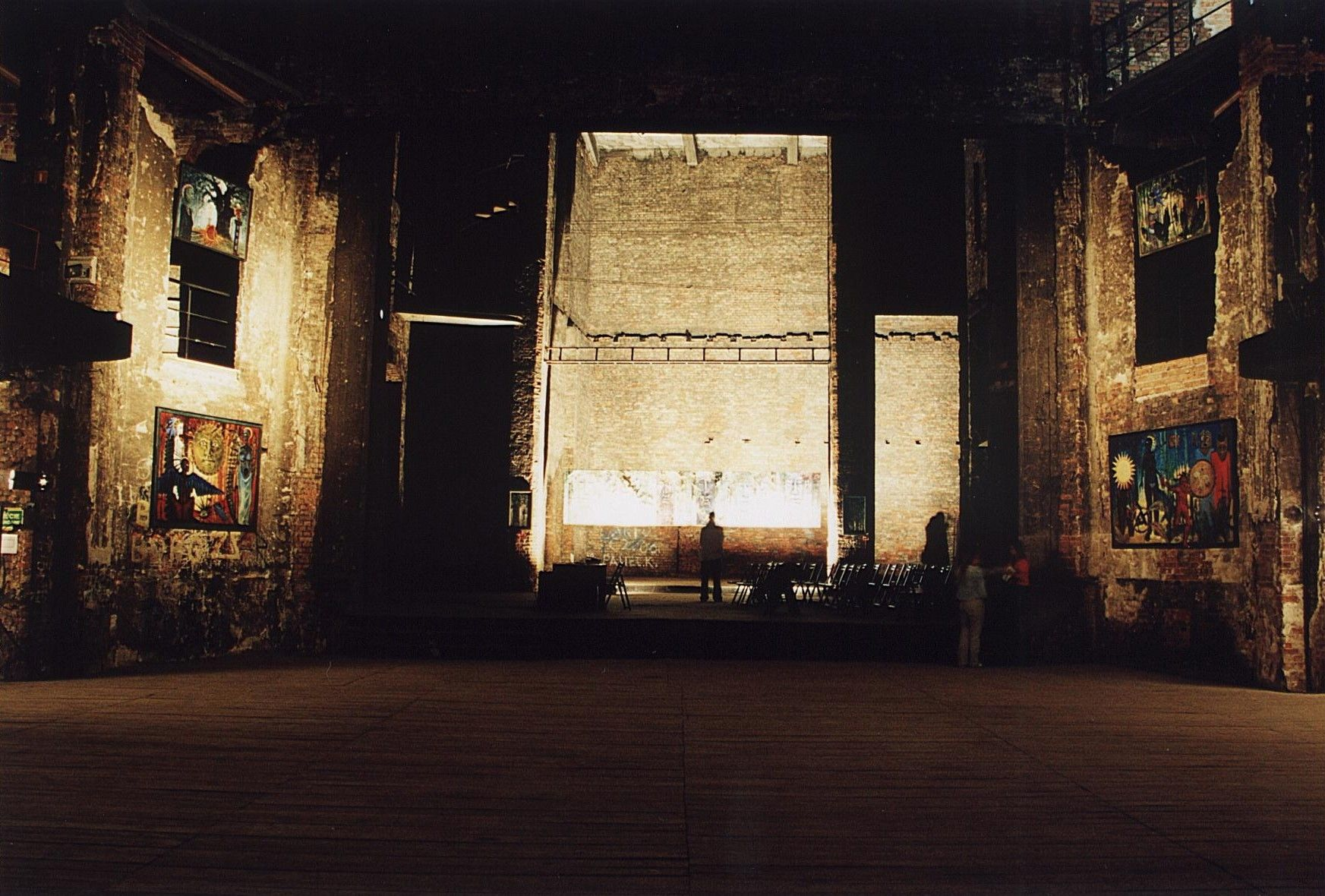
Interior view

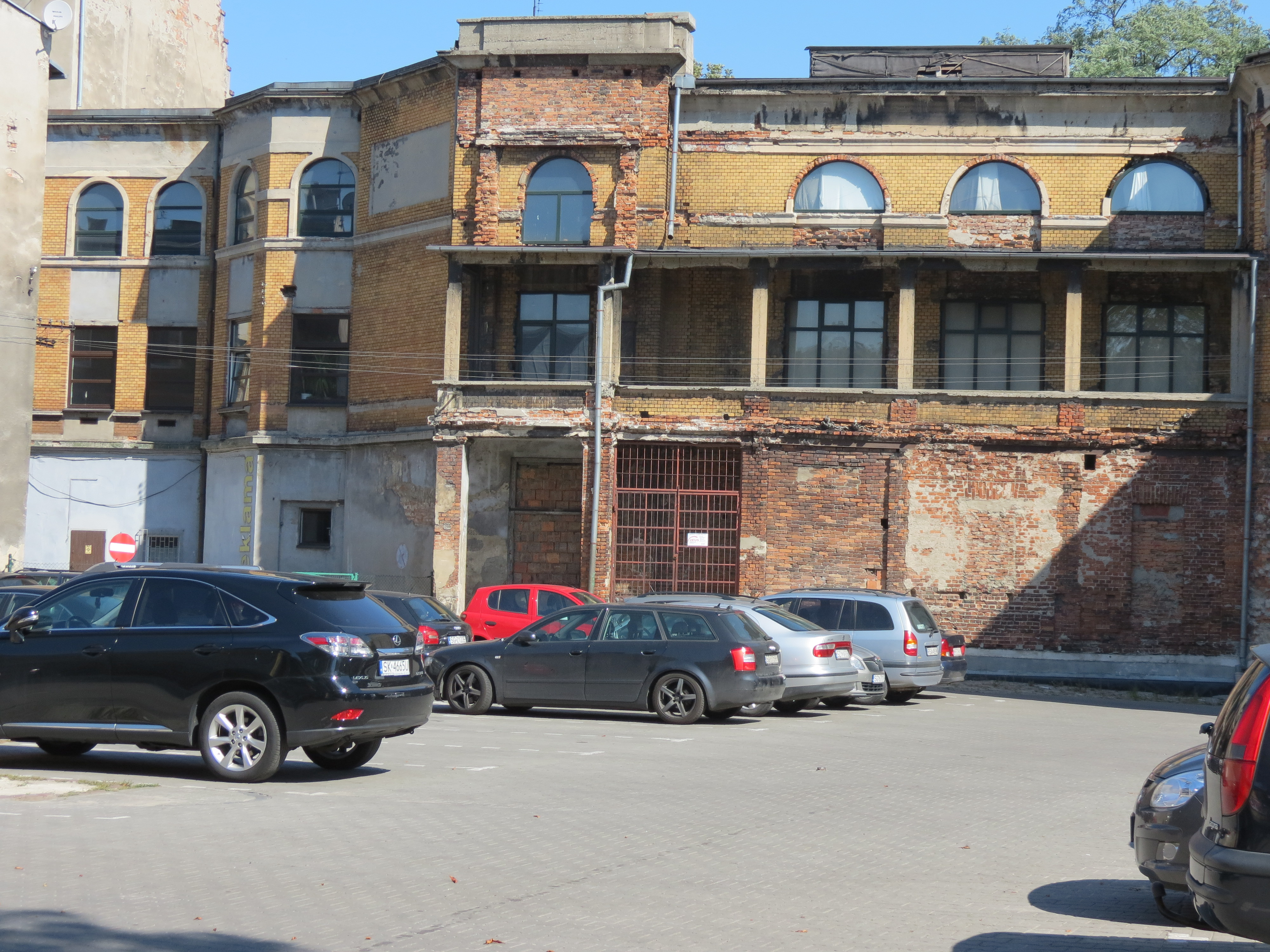
View from the west

Gliwice Theatre (Stadttheater Gleiwitz) was initially a private and later a municipal stage in Gliwice in Upper Silesia. It was opened in 1899 as part of the "Victoria" establishment, later it became one of the largest theatres in Upper Silesia as the city theatre. In ruins since 1945, the building remained unused for decades. Occasional events have been taking place in the ruins since the 1990s, and efforts are being made to rebuild it. The ruin is located at Aleja Przyjaźni 18 in downtown Gliwice.

== History ==
The Victoria Theatre opened in 1899 as part of the Victoria Establishment, a large private cultural and entertainment centre with a hotel, restaurants and shops. The construction was carried out by Zimmermann and Wacha. The property belonged to Julius Leppich, who was also a partner in Victoria. Because the theatre was part of a building complex, it has not received any representative architecture and is located in a back courtyard, facing away from the main street Ulica Zwycięstwa (the former Wilhelmstrasse). In 1914 the city of Gleiwitz took over the theatre and contributed financially to the stage. The stage curtain was sewn by women from "Schönwald" who were known for their "Schönwald embroidery". Schönwald was a village near the city.

In 1924, the theatre was redesigned. Also in 1924, the theatres in Gliwice, Hindenburg O.S. and Bytom were merged to form the "Oberschlesisches Theater" (Upper Silesian Theatre) (between 1924 and 1927 "Theater Dreier Städte"). In addition, the "Upper Silesian Drama Theatre" was held in the building.

When the Red Army marched in on January 24, 1945, the interior of the theatre was set on fire and was never rebuilt. In the meantime, it was used as a warehouse. On the initiative of Ewa Strzelczyk (1961–1998), the director of the municipal cultural centre, the "Foundation for the Reconstruction of the City Theatre" was established in 1994. In 1996, the theatre was reopened for events, but the ruinous state was maintained. Since then it has been used for concerts, dance, theatre, musicals and film screenings. A well-known series of events is, for example, the "Jazz in Ruinach".

== Personalities ==
- Johannes Schüler (1894–1966), 2. Kapellmeister 1920–1922
- Therese Giehse, actress
- Philipp Wenning, Artistic director and senior director 1936–1938
- Hannes R. Zinder, actor Upper Silesian Drama Theatre 1943–1944
