= Nelly Sachs =

Jewish German-Swedish writer, Holocaust survivor and Nobel laureate (1891–1970)

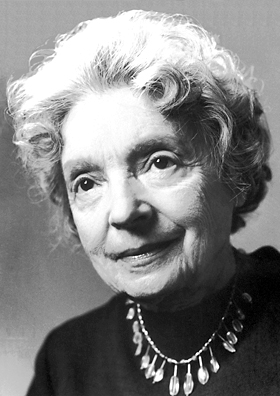
- Nelly Sachs, 1966
- Born: Leonie Sachs; 10 December 1891; Berlin-Schöneberg, German Empire
- Died: 12 May 1970 (aged 78); Stockholm, Sweden
- Occupations: Poet, playwright
- Writing career
- Notable awards: Nobel Prize in Literature (1966); Droste-Preis (1960)

Signature
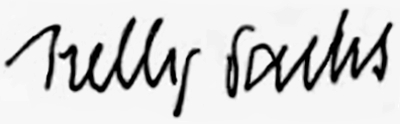

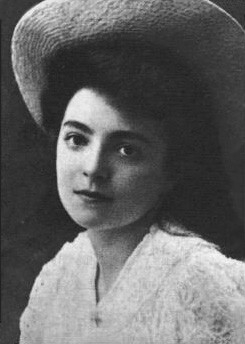
Nelly Sachs, 1910

Nelly Sachs (German: [ˈnɛli ˈzaks]; 10 December 1891 – 12 May 1970) was a German–Swedish poet and playwright. Her experiences resulting from the rise of the Nazis in World War II Europe transformed her into a poignant spokesperson for the grief and yearnings of her fellow Jews. Her best-known play is Eli: Ein Mysterienspiel vom Leiden Israels (1950) (lit: Eli: A Mystery Play of Israel's Suffering); other works include the poems "Zeichen im Sand" (1962), "Verzauberung" (1970), and the collections of poetry In den Wohnungen des Todes (1947), Flucht und Verwandlung (1959), Fahrt ins Staublose (1961), and Suche nach Lebenden (1971). In 1966, she shared the Nobel Prize in Literature with the novelist, poet, and short-story writer Shmuel Yosef Agnon.

== Life and career ==
Leonie Sachs was born in Berlin-Schöneberg, Germany, in 1891 to a Jewish family. Her parents were the wealthy natural rubber and gutta-percha (latex) manufacturers Georg William Sachs (1858–1930) and his wife Margarete, née Karger (1871–1950). She was educated at home because of frail health. She showed early signs of talent as a dancer, but her protective parents did not encourage her to pursue a profession. She grew up as a very sheltered, introverted young woman and never married. She pursued an extensive correspondence with her friends Selma Lagerlöf and Hilde Domin. As the Nazis took power, she became increasingly terrified, at one point losing the ability to speak, as she would remember in verse: "When the great terror came/I fell dumb." Sachs fled with her aged mother to Sweden in 1940. It was her friendship with Lagerlöf that saved their lives: shortly before her own death, Lagerlöf intervened with the Swedish royal family to secure their release from Germany. Sachs and her mother escaped on the last flight from Nazi Germany to Sweden, a week before Sachs was scheduled to report to a concentration camp. They settled in Sweden, and Sachs became a Swedish citizen in 1952.

Living in a tiny two-room apartment in Stockholm, Sachs cared for her mother alone for many years, and supported their existence by translations between Swedish and German. After her mother's death, Sachs suffered several psychotic breakdowns, characterized by hallucinations, paranoia, and delusions of persecution by Nazis, and spent a number of years in a mental institution. She continued to write while hospitalized, and eventually recovered sufficiently to live on her own, though her mental health remained fragile. Her worst breakdown was ostensibly precipitated by hearing spoken German during a trip to Switzerland to accept a literary prize. But she maintained a forgiving attitude toward younger Germans, and corresponded with many German-speaking writers of the postwar period, including Hans Magnus Enzensberger and Ingeborg Bachmann.

== Paul Celan and lyrical poetry ==
In the context of the Shoah, her deep friendship with "brother" poet Paul Celan is often noted today. Their bond was described in one of Celan's most famous poems, "Zürich, Zum Storchen" ("Zürich, The Stork Inn"). Sachs and Celan shared the Holocaust and the fate of the Jews throughout history, their interest in Jewish and Christian beliefs and practices, and their literary models; their imagery was often remarkably similar, though developed independently. Their friendship was supportive during professional conflicts. Celan also suffered from artistic infighting (Claire Goll's accusations of plagiarism) during a period of frustration with his work's reception. When Sachs met Celan she was embroiled in a long dispute with Finnish-Jewish composer Moses Pergament over his adaptation of her play Eli: Ein Mysterienspiel vom Leiden Israels. In Celan she found someone who understood her anxiety and hardships as an artist.

Sachs's poetry is intensely lyrical and reflects some influence by German Romanticism, especially in her early work. The poetry she wrote as a young woman in Berlin is more inspired by Christianity than Judaism and makes use of traditional Romantic imagery and themes. Much of it concerns an unhappy love affair Sachs suffered in her teens with a non-Jewish man who would eventually be killed in a concentration camp. After Sachs learned of her only love interest's death, she bound up his fate with that of her people and wrote many love lyrics ending not only in the beloved's death, but in the catastrophe of the Holocaust. Sachs herself mourns no longer as a jilted lover but as a personification of the Jewish people in their vexed relationship with history and God. Her fusion of grief with subtly romantic elements is in keeping with the imagery of the kabbalah, where the Shekhinah represents God's presence on earth and mourns for the separation of God from His people in their suffering. Thus Sachs's Romanticism allowed her to develop self-consciously from a German to a Jewish writer, with a corresponding change in her language: still flowery and conventional in some of her first poetry on the Holocaust, it becomes ever more compressed and surreal, returning to a series of the same images and tropes (dust, stars, breath, stones and jewels, blood, dancers, fish suffering out of water, madness, and ever-frustrated love) in ways that are sometimes comprehensible only to her readers, but always moving and disturbing. Though Sachs does not resemble many authors, she appears to have been influenced by Gertrud Kolmar and Else Lasker-Schüler, in addition to Celan.

In 1961 Sachs won the first Nelly Sachs Prize, a literary award given biennially by the German city of Dortmund and named in her honour. The city commissioned Walter Steffens to compose the opera Eli based on her mystery play, which premiered at the new opera house in 1967. When, with Shmuel Yosef Agnon, she was awarded the 1966 Nobel Prize in Literature, she observed that Agnon represented Israel whereas "I represent the tragedy of the Jewish people." She read her poem "In der Flucht" at the ceremony.

Sachs died from colorectal cancer in 1970. She was interred in the Norra begravningsplatsen in Stockholm. Her possessions were donated to the National Library of Sweden.

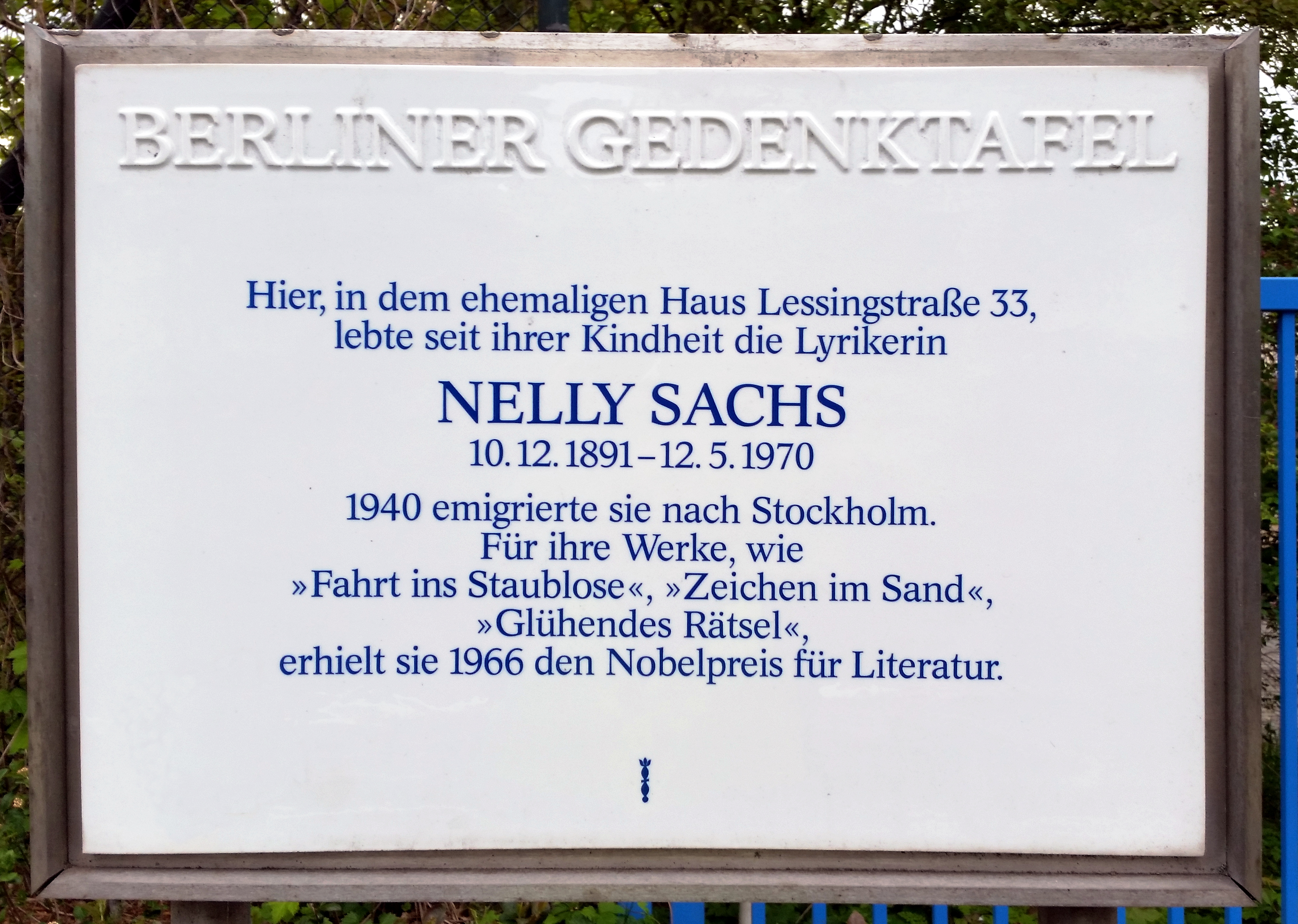
A Berlin memorial plaque at the site of Sachs' former house in Lessingstraße, Hansaviertel, Berlin.

A memorial plaque commemorates her birthplace, Maaßenstraße 12, in Schöneberg, Berlin, where there is also a park named for her in Dennewitzstraße. A park on the island of Kungsholmen in Stockholm also bears her name.

== Partial bibliography ==
=== Poetry ===
- In den Wohnungen des Todes [In the Houses of Death], 1947.
- Sternverdunkelung [Eclipse of Stars], 1949.
- Und niemand weiss weiter [And No One Knows Where to Go], 1957.
- Flucht und Verwandlung [Flight and Metamorphosis], 1959.
- Fahrt ins Staublose: Die Gedichte der Nelly Sachs 1 [Journey into the Dustless Realm: The Poetry of Nelly Sachs, 1], 1961.
- Zeichen im Sand [Signs in the Sand], 1962
- Suche nach Lebenden: Die Gedichte der Nelly Sachs 2 [Search for the Living: The Poetry of Nelly Sachs, 2], 1971.

=== Stories ===
- Legenden und Erzählungen [Legends and Tales], 1921.

=== Drama ===
- Eli: Ein Mysterienspiel vom Leiden Israels [Eli: A Mystery Play of the Suffering of Israel], 1950

=== Letters ===
- Briefe der Nelly Sachs [Letters of Nelly Sachs] ed. Ruth Dinesen and Helmut Müssener, 1984.
- Paul Celan, Nelly Sachs: Correspondence, tr. Christopher Clark, ed. Barbara Wiedemann, 1995.

=== Translations ===
- O the Chimneys: Selected Poems, Including the Verse Play, Eli, tr. Michael Hamburger et al., 1967.
- The Seeker and Other Poems. tr. Ruth Mead, Matthew Mead, and Michael Hamburger, 1970.
- Contemporary German Poetry, selections, ed. and tr. Gertrude C. Schwebell, 1964.
- Collected Poems I, 1944–1949, 2007.
- Glowing Enigmas, tr. Michael Hamburger, 2013.
- Flight and Metamorphosis, tr. Joshua Weiner with Linda B. Parshall, 2022.

Sachs is published by Suhrkamp Verlag.

== See also ==
- List of female Nobel laureates
- List of Jewish Nobel laureates
- Manfred George, Nelly Sachs's cousin
