= Anton Marik =

Austrian conductor (1940–2025)

Anton Marik (1940 – 19 July 2025) was an Austrian conductor who made a career with orchestras and choirs in Germany.

== Career ==
Born in Vienna, Marik had been a member of the Vienna Boys' Choir and received his basic musical training there. After graduating from a Humanistisches Gymnasium he studied conducting (among others with Hans Swarowsky), composition and pipe organ at the Academy of Fine Arts Vienna. Already during his studies, Marik worked as a piano accompanist for soloists of the Vienna State Opera and the Vienna Philharmonic and gained first experiences as a choir and orchestra conductor.

Marik began his career in 1965 as chief conductor of the Vienna Ice Revue. His first theatre engagements led him to the Stadttheater Klagenfurt and the Landestheater Linz, where he rose from solorepetitor to choir director and finally to first Kapellmeister. In 1975 he took up a position as first Kapellmeister at the Theater Bielefeld, then went in this function to the Staatstheater Kassel, before he held the same position with the Dortmunder Philharmoniker from 1985 to 1989. This was followed by employment as Generalmusikdirektor (GMD) at the Staatstheater Kassel until Marik returned to Dortmund in 1994, where he was first appointed deputy GMD and from 1996 to 2000 GMD of Dortmund. From August 2001 to July 2004 he was chief conductor of the WDR Rundfunkchor Köln. He then became music director of the Theater Koblenz.

In addition, Marik has been engaged as a guest conductor at home and abroad, participated in CD recordings and recordings for various radio stations, and participated in numerous festivals, such as the Internationales Brahms Festival in Milan, the Beethoven Festival in Budapest and the Koblenz Festungsspiele on the Ehrenbreitstein Fortress.

Marik died in July 2025.
