= Wilhelm Schüchter =

German conductor (1911–1974)

- Wilhelm Schüchter, in 1968
- Born: 15 December 1911; Siegburg, Germany
- Died: 27 May 1974 (aged 62); Dortmund, North Rhine-Westphalia, West Germany
- Education: Hochschule für Musik Köln
- Occupations: Pianist; Conductor
- Organizations: Nordwestdeutsche Philharmonie; NHK Symphony Orchestra; Dortmund Opera

Wilhelm Schüchter (15 December 1911 – 27 May 1974) was a German conductor. Between 1959 and 1962, he was the music director of the NHK Symphony Orchestra in Tokyo and is credited for raising its standards to an international level. He was Generalmusikdirektor in Dortmund from 1962 until his death. He opened the new opera house in 1966 with Der Rosenkavalier by Richard Strauss, and conducted the world premiere of the opera Eli by Walter Steffens after the drama of Nelly Sachs in 1967. He left a legacy of opera recordings, especially of excerpts sung in German.

== Career ==
=== Early years ===
Born in Siegburg on 15 December 1911, Schüchter studied piano at the Hochschule für Musik Köln, composition with Philipp Jarnach, and orchestral conducting with Hermann Abendroth. His debut as a conductor was at the Landestheater Coburg Mascagni's Cavalleria rusticana and Leoncavallo's Pagliacci.

In 1940, he was at the Mainfranken Theater Würzburg, a year later he worked at the Stadttheater Aachen under Herbert von Karajan. In 1943, he was first Kapellmeister of the Theater am Nollendorfplatz, the municipal opera of Berlin. From 1945 to 1957, he was second conductor under Hans Schmidt-Isserstedt of the Sinfonieorchester von Radio Hamburg, in 1956 named NDR Sinfonieorchester. From 1953 to 1955, he was also principal conductor of the Nordwestdeutsche Philharmonie in Herford. From 1959 he conducted the NHK Symphony Orchestra in Tokyo.

=== In Japan ===
Schüchter first visited Japan in November 1957, while accompanying the Berlin Philharmonic Orchestra on tour as an assistant to Karajan, who had been appointed music director the previous year. Illness forced Karajan to cancel some of his Japanese engagements; Schüchter replaced him at a morning broadcast recording session with the NHK Symphony Orchestra on 21 November, then at an evening Berlin Philharmonic Orchestra performance in Sendai. His professionalism and efficiency in rehearsal impressed the NHK musicians, who were already aware of the conductor's reputation through his recordings. They decided to appoint Schüchter as their music director, with his tenure set to begin in March 1959.

When he returned to Japan on 13 February 1959 to begin his new role with NHK, his arrival in Yokohama attracted significant journalistic coverage from across Japan. The next day, he stated at a press conference that he looked forward to instilling in Japanese musicians his ideals of performance and expressive interpretation.

Schüchter made exacting demands on the musicians of the NHK Symphony. In his drive to raise the orchestra's standards, he fired approximately a third of its personnel. He was also exigent with NHK studio staff on their broadcast and commercial recordings. He carefully supervised post-production of recordings to ensure that the best takes were edited into a finished whole seamlessly.

In 1960, Schüchter led the NHK Symphony on its first world tour. By 1962, during Schüchter's last season as music director, the critic Nomura Kōichi reported that the conductor's efforts resulted in the NHK Symphony attaining a level of refinement "that no Japanese orchestra had ever achieved before". Schüchter's popularity with Japanese audiences was such that NHK broadcast a retrospective of his concerts over eight consecutive nights, culminating with his farewell concert on 25 March.

According to the music critic Itakura Shigeo, Schüchter is considered a pivotal figure in the NHK Symphony's history.

=== Later years ===
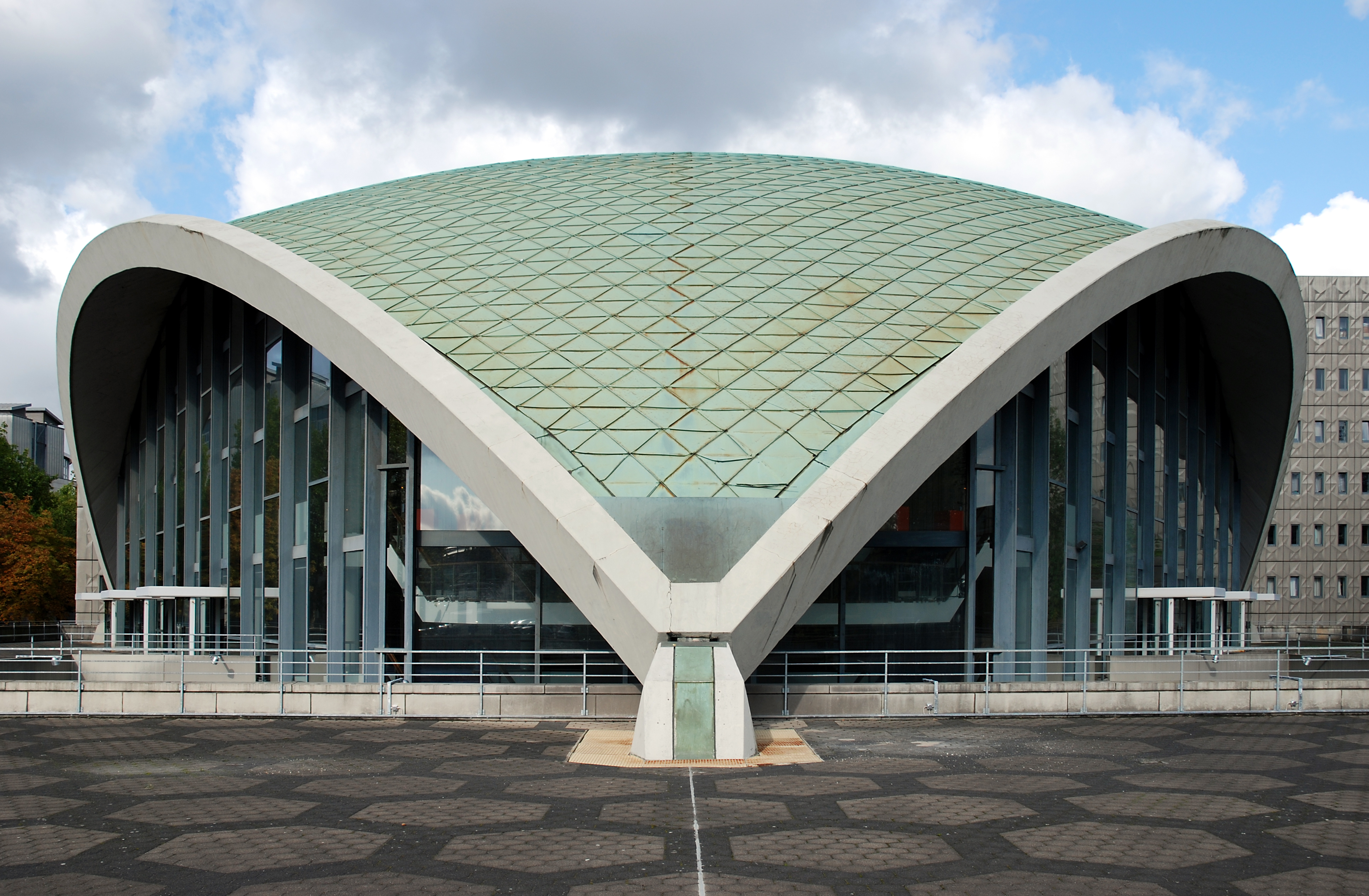
The new Opernhaus Dortmund

Schüchter was from 1962 Generalmusikdirektor of the Dortmunder Philharmoniker, since 1966 also Intendant of the Dortmund Opera. He improved the quality of the orchestra and opened the new Opernhaus Dortmund with a performance of Der Rosenkavalier by Richard Strauss, with Elisabeth Grümmer as Marschallin, Teresa Żylis-Gara in the title role, Liselotte Hammes as Sophie, and Kurt Böhme as Ochs. In 1967, he conducted the premiere of the opera Eli by Walter Steffens after the drama of Nelly Sachs, a commission of the city of Dortmund.

Schüchter died in Dortmund, at age 62.

== Recordings ==
In 1954, he conducted recordings of Handel's organ concertos with Geraint Jones and the Philharmonia Orchestra.

Schüchter recorded operas and excerpts of operas (Querschnitte) for EMI, typically sung in German by notable soloists such as Elisabeth Grümmer and Erika Köth. In 1951, he recorded Wagner's Der fliegende Holländer with Hans Hotter in the title role, Kurt Böhme as Daland, Helene Werth as Senta, Bernd Aldenhoff as Erik, Res Fischer as Mary and Helmut Krebs as Steuermann, with North German Radio Symphony Orchestra and Choir. In 1953, he recorded, again with Chor und Sinfonieorchester des Norddeutschen Rundfunks, Wagner's Lohengrin with Rudolf Schock in the title role, Gottlob Frick as Heinrich, Maud Cunitz as Elsa, Josef Metternich as Telramund, Margarete Klose as Ortrud. In 1953, he conducted Puccini's Tosca, sung in German by Carla Martinis in the title role, Schock as Cavaradossi, and Josef Metternich as Scarpia. In 1955, he recorded Smetana's opera The Bartered Bride with the Nordwestdeutsche Philharmonie, the chorus of the Landestheater Hannover, Erna Berger, Schock, Frick, Hanns-Heinz Nissen, Christa Ludwig, Theodor Schlott and Marga Höffgen. In 1955, he recorded Der Rosenkavalier with the Berlin Philharmonic, Leonie Rysanek as Marschallin, Elisabeth Grümmer in the title role, Erika Köth as Sophie, Gustav Neidlinger as Ochs, Sieglinde Wagner as Annina and Josef Traxel as the Italian singer.

In the 1960s, he recorded excerpts of operas, Flotow's Martha, Lortzing's Undine (with Lisa Otto) and Der Wildschütz, and Weber's Oberon with Jess Thomas as Hüon and Ingrid Bjoner as Rezia. With the Deutsche Oper Berlin he recorded excerpts of Gounod's Margarete (with Hilde Güden), Mascagni's Cavalleria rusticana with Rysanek, Schock and Metternich, and Nicolai's Die lustigen Weiber von Windsor with Köth, Frick and Dietrich Fischer-Dieskau.

He also conducted radio productions, namely for the NDR and the WDR.
