= Opernhaus Dortmund =

Opera house of Dortmund

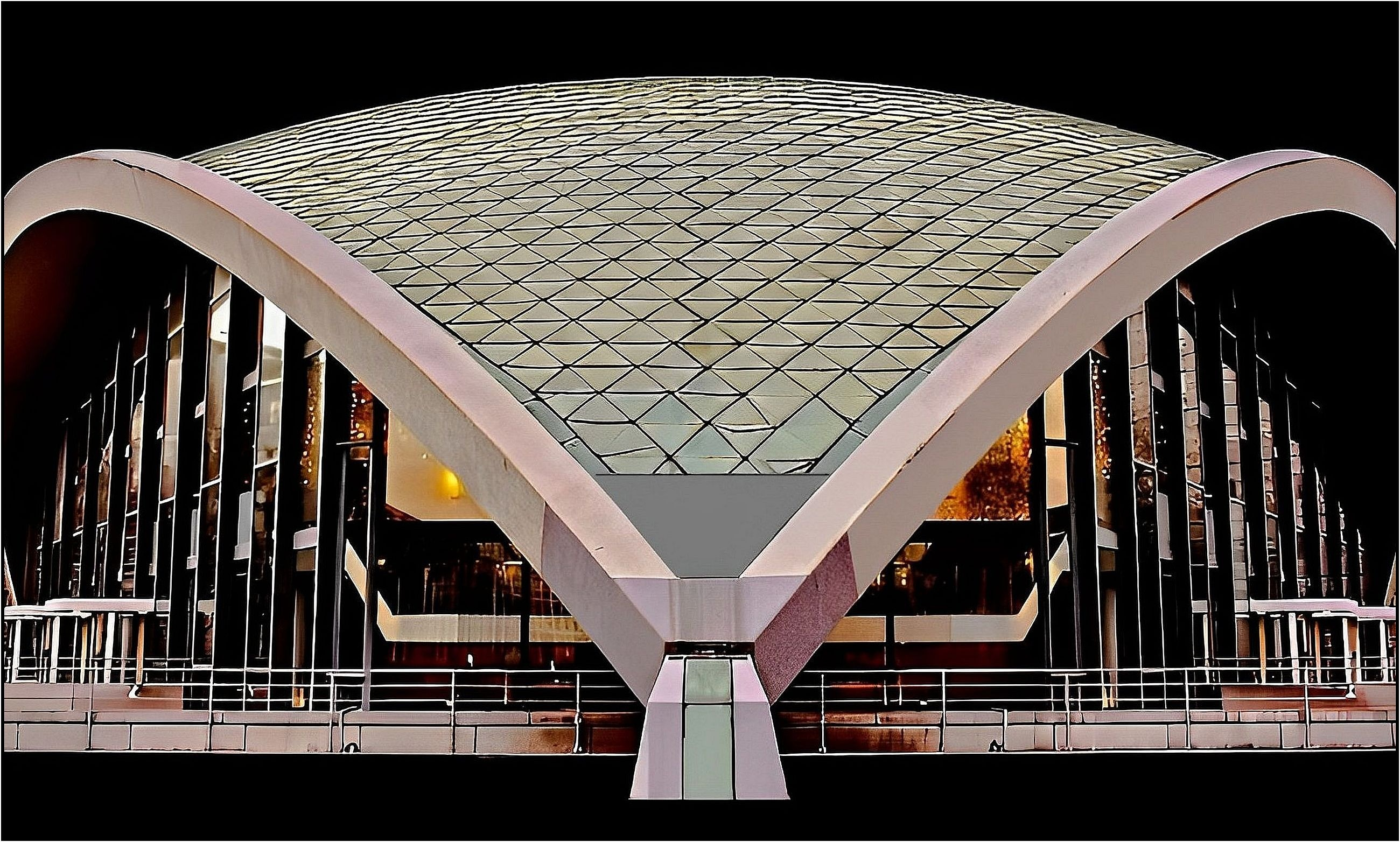
- The opera house in 2014
- Interactive map of the Opernhaus Dortmund area

General information
- Location: Dortmund, North Rhine-Westphalia, Germany
- Coordinates: 51.5110°N 7.4616°E
- Opened: 1966

Design and construction
- Architects: Heinrich Rosskotten; Edgar Tritthart

Website
- www.theaterdo.de

Opernhaus Dortmund is the opera house of Dortmund, Germany, operated by the Theater Dortmund organisation. A new opera house opened in 1966, replacing an earlier facility which opened in 1904 and was destroyed during World War II. It was built on the former site of the Old Synagogue, which was demolished by the Nazi local government in the 1930s.

Architects Heinrich Rosskotten and Edgar Tritthart designed the modernist structure. The design separates the functions of the stage and technical areas in the Bühnenhaus (stage house), which is dominated by straight lines, from the auditorium under a concrete shell roof.

== Opening season ==
The new house opened on 3 March 1966, to serve as a venue for operas, ballets, concerts, and for plays which require a large stage. The inaugural performance was Richard Strauss's Der Rosenkavalier, an opera first performed in 1911, shortly after its premiere; Wilhelm Schüchter conducted the Dortmunder Philharmoniker. Teresa Żylis-Gara appeared as Octavian, along with guest artist Elisabeth Grümmer as the Marschallin, Liselotte Hammes as Sophie and Kurt Böhme as Ochs. In the short remaining part of the season, Verdi's Il trovatore, with Fedora Barbieri as Azucena, Mozart's Die Zauberflöte, Hindemith's Mathis der Maler, and Johann Strauss' Der Zigeunerbaron were performed.

The first plays staged in the so-called Großes Haus during this period were Brecht's Leben des Galilei and Anouilh's Becket. Unusual for the era of the Iron Curtain, the Volkstheater Rostock performed Peter Weiss's Die Verfolgung und Ermordung Jean Paul Marats dargestellt durch die Schauspielgruppe des Hospizes zu Charenton unter Anleitung des Herrn de Sade.

== Administrative personnel ==
Marek Janowski was the Generalmusikdirektor from 1973 to 1979, followed by Moshe Atzmon (1996–2000), Anton Marik, Arthur Fagen, and since 2008 Jac van Steen. The Dortmunder Philharmoniker used the opera house for concerts until 2002.

Christine Mielitz was Opera Director at the Dortmund Theatre for the 2002 / 2003 season.

Jens-Daniel Herzog has been Opera Director since August 2011.

== World premieres and repertoire ==
In 1967, Schüchter conducted the world premiere of the opera Eli by Walter Steffens. The city of Dortmund commissioned the work based on the drama by Nelly Sachs.

The facility hosted the first performance of Reinhard Febel's opera Sekunden und Jahre des Caspar Hauser in 1992 with Alexander Marco-Buhrmester in the title role.

Pascal Paul-Harang produced the second staging of Gavin Bryars 1998 opera Doctor Ox's Experiment in 1999, with Alexander Rumpf conducting.

In 2000, Michael Hofstetter conducted a production of Wagner's Tristan und Isolde.

Oper Dormund commissioned Wallenberg from Erkki-Sven Tüür and premiered the work on 5 May 2001 with staging by Philipp Kochheim and Alexander Rumpf as conductor.

In 2004, Theater Dortmund planned a new production of Wagner's Der Ring des Nibelungen to commemorate the 100th anniversary of the first opera house. The production began with Das Rheingold on 26 June 2005, directed by Christine Mielitz and conducted by Arthur Fagen and continued with Siegfried on 2 September 2006. In April 2007, the company performed a complete cycle. In 2009, Mielitz staged Henze's Der junge Lord, conducted by Jac van Steen, as part of project RUHR.2010 that named the whole Ruhr that year's European Capital of Culture.

Beverley Blankenship staged Verdi's Falstaff beginning 11 April 2010, with Jac van Steen conducting and Jacek Strauch in the title role.
