= Moshe Atzmon =

Israeli conductor

- משה עצמון
- Born: Móse Grószberger; July 30, 1931 (age 94); Budapest, Hungary
- Occupation: Conductor

Moshe Atzmon (Hebrew: משה עצמון; born 30 July 1931) is an Israeli conductor.

== Life and career ==
He was born Móse Grószberger in Budapest, and at the age of thirteen, he emigrated with his family to Tel Aviv, Israel. He started his musical career on the horn before going to London for further studies in conducting.

He has won several conducting prizes and held many positions with major orchestras. He was chief conductor of the Sydney Symphony Orchestra from 1967 to 1971 and the Sinfonieorchester Basel from 1972 to 1986. He was chief conductor of orchestras in Tokyo, Nagoya, and Rennes and of the Dortmunder Philharmoniker.

Preceded by Hans Schmidt-Isserstedt	Principal Conductors, North German Radio Symphony Orchestra; 1971–1976	Succeeded by Klaus Tennstedt
