= Robert F. Denzler =

Swiss composer and conductor

Robert Heinrich Friedrich Denzler (19 March 1892 – 25 August 1972) was a Swiss composer and conductor. He was committed to the music of Richard Wagner and contemporary works.

== Life ==
Denzler was the son of a rope maker. He studied with Fritz Niggli (piano) as well as with William Ackroyd and with Willem de Boer (violin) at the Zurich University of the Arts. He also received private lessons in theory and composition from Volkmar Andreae, principal conductor of the Tonhalle Orchester Zürich. In 1911/12, he was trained as a concert pianist at the Rheinische Musikschule with Lazzaro Uzielli. During the summer months, he also worked as a musical assistant at the Bayreuth Festival under the conductors Hans Richter, Karl Muck and Michael Balling and as répétiteur at the Cologne Stadttheater.

From 1912 to 1915, he was municipal music director in Lucerne. In 1913, he became cantonal music director. After that, he became the 1st Kapellmeister of the Zurich Opera House, succeeding Lothar Kempters. There, he conducted several world premieres and first performances like Othmar Schoeck's Don Ranudo in 1919. From 1917 to 1927, he was also director of the Lehrergesangsverein Zürich. From 1925 to 1931 he organised the Wagner Festival at the Grand Théâtre de Genève in cooperation with the Orchestre de la Suisse Romande, where he gave the first performances of Das Rheingold, die Götterdämmerung and Parsifal. Guest conductors led him to Paris. In 1927, he changed to the Deutsche Oper Berlin in Berlin-Charlottenburg.

From 1937 to 1947, he was chief music director at the Zurich City Theatre. There he stood up for the "degenerate music" that was spurned by the Nazis. He brought Alban Berg's Lulu in 1937 and Paul Hindemith's opera Mathis der Maler to the premiere in 1938. He was also responsible for the Swiss premieres of Richard Strauss' Die schweigsame Frau (1936), Shostakovich's Lady Macbeth of the Mtsensk District (1936), Heinrich Sutermeister's Romeo and Juliet (1940) and Heinrich Schoeck's Das Schloss Dürande (1943). In 1946, he had to resign from his post due to his links with National Socialism in the early 1930s; during his Berlin years (1932) he joined the NSDAP as a foreigner, probably to keep his post in Berlin. Later he admitted his political flaws.

From the end of the 1940s, he worked as a guest conductor in Germany and abroad. Concert tours led him through Europe and to South America. Amongst others he performed at the Salzburg Festival. In 1959, he was awarded the Hans-Georg-Nägeli-Medal of the city of Zurich (on the occasion of the world premiere of his Romantic Symphony). In 1960, he took over the Sunday concert in the Kongresshaus Zürich.

As a composer he wrote chamber music (among others two string quartets), orchestral works and vocal music.

He was a Calvinist-reformed and married the singer Idalice Anrig-Denzler (1894–1974). Their daughter Sylva Denzler (b. 1919) became an actress.

Denzler died in Zurich at the age of 80. His estate is kept in the Zentralbibliothek Zürich after a family bequest.
