= Mathis der Maler (opera) =

Opera by Paul Hindemith

- Opera by Paul Hindemith
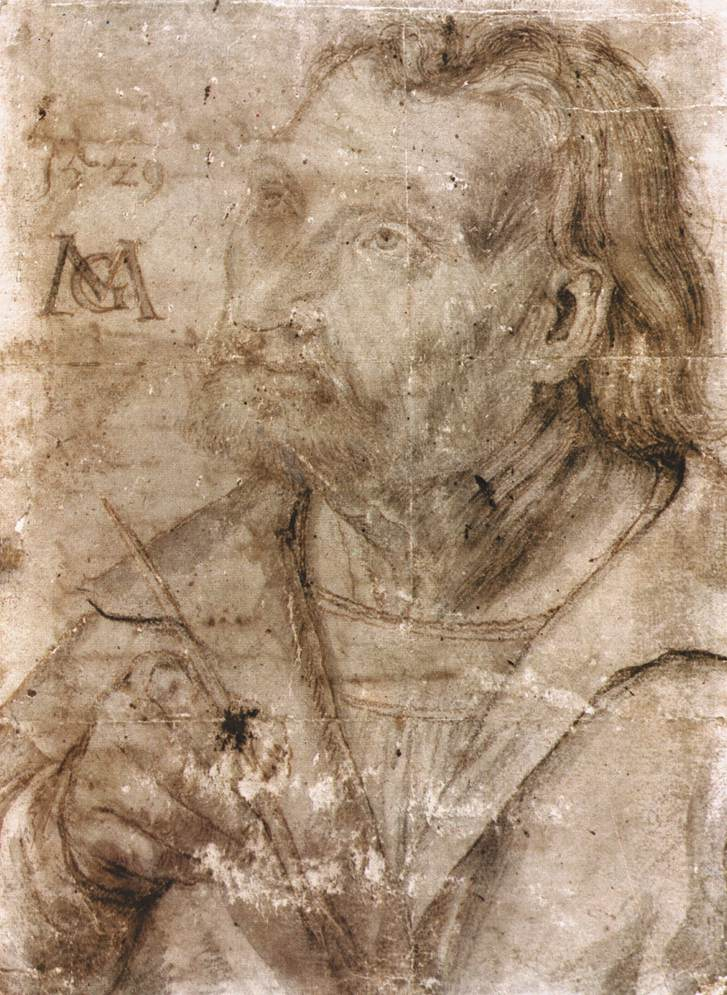
- John the Evangelist by Matthias Grünewald, regarded in Hindemith's time as a self-portrait
- Translation: Matthias the Painter
- Librettist: Hindemith
- Language: German
- Based on: Matthias Grünewald
- Premiere: 28 May 1938; Zürich Opera

Mathis der Maler (Matthias the Painter) is an opera by Paul Hindemith. The work's protagonist, Matthias Grünewald, was a historical figure who flourished during the Reformation, and whose art, in particular the Isenheim Altarpiece, inspired many creative figures in the early 20th century.

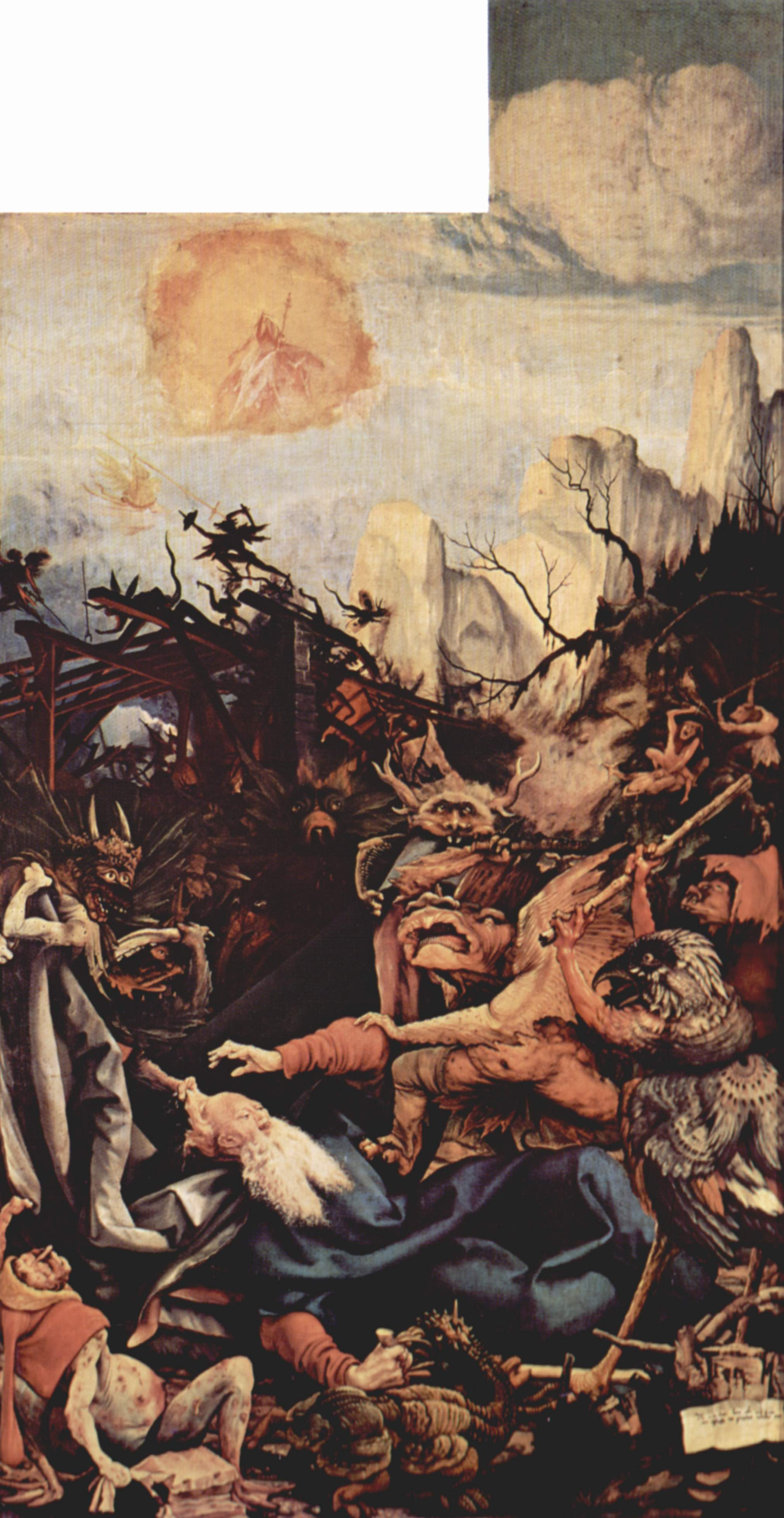
The temptation of St. Anthony from the Isenheim Altarpiece

Hindemith completed the opera, writing his own libretto, in 1935. By that time, however, the rise of Nazism prevented Hindemith from securing a performance in Germany. The story, set during the German Peasants' War (1524–25), concerns Matthias's struggle for artistic freedom of expression in the repressive climate of his day, which mirrored Hindemith's own struggle as the Nazis attained power and repressed dissent. The opera's obvious political message did not escape the regime.

== Performance history ==
The opera was first performed at the Opernhaus Zürich on 28 May 1938, conducted by Robert Denzler. On 14 October 1956, a rebuilt Schauspiel Köln in Cologne opened with a gala performance of the opera. On 9 and 11 March in 1939 the opera Mathis der Maler was performed in Amsterdam, conducted by Karl Schmid-Bloss, director of the Opera in Zürich. At the same time the Rijksmuseum Amsterdam made a documentary exhibition of the painting 'The Small Crucifixion' and two drawings by Mathias Grunewald owned by Franz Koenigs. The British premiere was in Edinburgh on 29 August 1952, and it was first given in the United States on 17 February 1956, at Boston University, conducted by Sarah Caldwell.

In contrast to the popular Symphony: Mathis der Maler, the large-scale opera itself is only occasionally staged. A notable US production was that of the New York City Opera in 1995. Hamburg State Opera staged the work in 2005. It was being performed at the Gran Teatre del Liceu in Barcelona when the building was destroyed by a fire in January 1994.

== Main roles ==
Roles, voice types, premiere cast
Role	Voice type	Premiere cast, 28 May 1938 Conductor: Robert Denzler
Albrecht von Brandenburg, Cardinal Archbishop of Mainz	tenor	Peter Baxevanos
Countess Helfenstein	contralto	
Hans Schwalb, leader of the peasants	tenor	
Regina, Schwalb's child daughter	soprano	Emmy Leni Funk
Lorenz von Pommersfelden, Catholic Dean of Mainz Cathedral	bass	Fritz Honisch
Riedinger, a rich protestant citizen	bass	Albert Emmerich
Ursula, Riedinger's daughter	soprano	Judith Hellwig
Mathis, a painter, in love with Ursula	baritone	Asger Stieg
Sylvester von Schaumberg, an army officer	tenor	
Truchsess von Waldburg, army general	bass	Marko Rothmüller
Wolfgang Capito, Albrecht's counsellor	tenor	Fridolin Mossbacher

== Synopsis ==
=== Scene 1 ===
In a cloister courtyard Mathis's musings and doubts about his vocation are interrupted by the peasant leader Schwalb and his child Regina. Moved by the peasants' plight, he offers his horse and stays to face the pursuing Sylvester who dares not arrest the cardinal's favorite painter.

=== Scene 2 ===
A riot between Catholics, Lutherans and students in front of Albrecht's residence in Mainz is averted only by the arrival of the Cardinal himself with relics of St. Martin:

Kann ich nicht immer bei euch sein, bin ich doch bedacht,
Den Ruhm der Stadt zu mehren. Hier soll versammelt sein,
Was an Werk und Wort Edles der Menschengeist
Hervorbringt. Ein deutsches Rom am Rhein.
Nehmt dies Geschenk als Zeugen für mein Wort hin.

Translation:

Even if I cannot always be amongst you, I intend to
Enhance the prestige of our city. May here be assembled
Everything noble that human thought has generated
In art and words. A German Rome on the Rhine.
May this gift be witness of my words.

He promises the merchant Riedinger to countermand an order to burn books, but later gives in to Pomerfeld, who points out that he cannot defy Rome. Mathis, reunited with Reidinger's daughter Ursula, is recognized by Sylvester and makes a passionate plea to Albrecht not to join in the suppression of the peasant's revolt. Realizing he cannot change his friend's mind, Albrecht grants him safe passage to join their cause.

=== Scene 3 ===
The Lutherans are at first outraged when Capito leads soldiers to the stash of hidden books in Reidinger's house ("Ein Verbrechen / Gegen Luther, gegen deutsche Glaubenskraft" [A crime / Against Luther, against the power of German faith]), but appeased when he reveals a letter from Luther to Albrecht suggesting that he demonstrate his advanced views by marrying:

"Ein Vorbild wäre kurfürstliche Gnaden, weil sie gleichsam
mitten in deutschen Landen eines der größten Häupter
ist. Das würde viele Leute beruhigen und gewinnen und
andere Bischöfe nachziehen."

Translation:

"Your electoral Grace would be an example, as you surely are
One of the most important princes, situated in the midst
Of Germany. A lot of people would be appeased and allured, and
Other bishops would follow you."

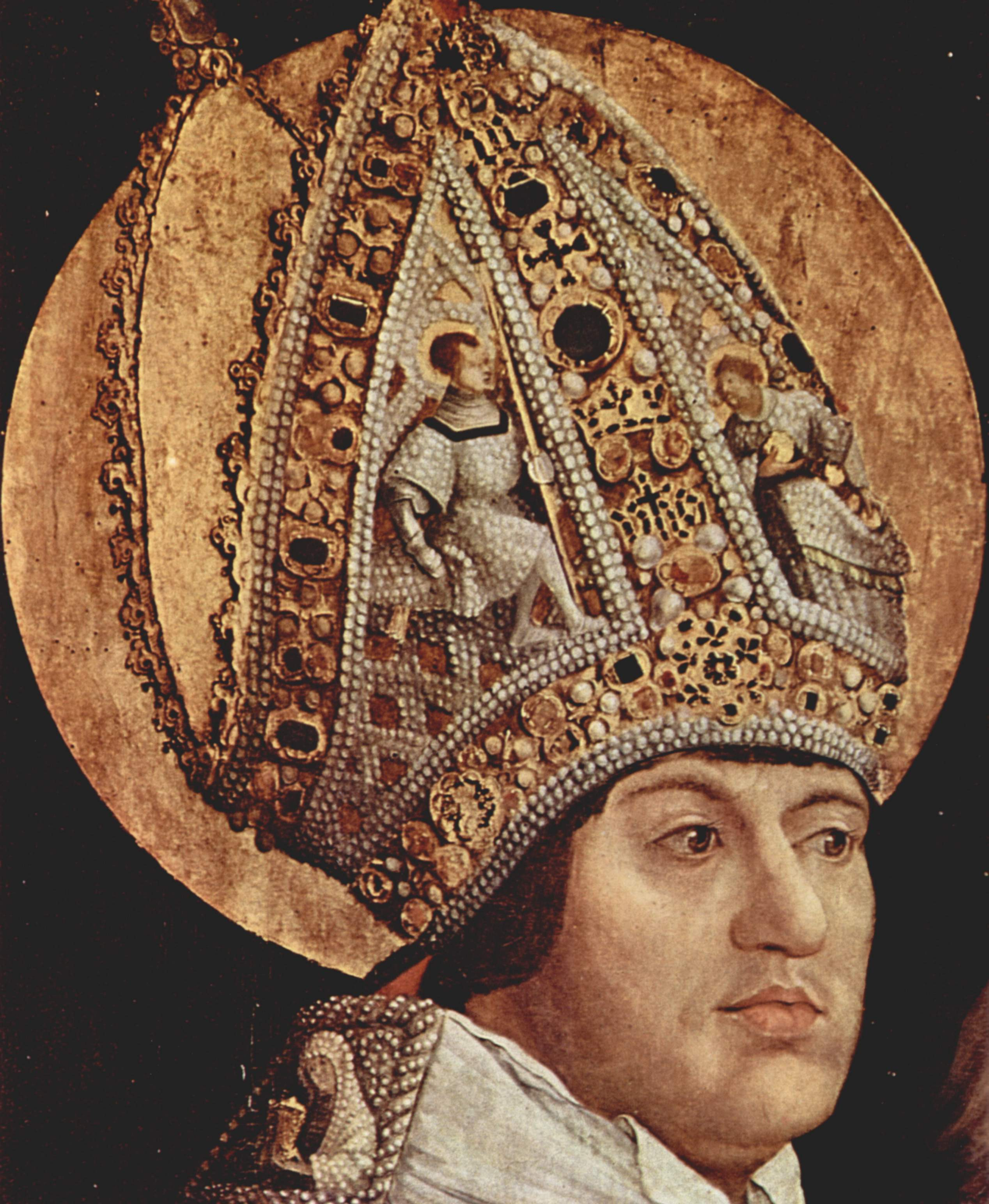
Albert of Mainz as St. Erasmus (Alte Pinakothek, Munich)

Albrecht, "the strongest clerical prince in Germany" who "... holds / The fate of the Empire in his hands" is in such dire financial straits that it is likely he would agree, and Reidinger asks Ursula to give thought to the matter as it would be to the benefit of both the Lutheran faith and the Empire. Mathis arrives to bid farewell and insists she cannot follow him to the war. When her father returns she gives her consent to the plan.

At the end of scene 3, all men chant a paean to God, their religion and the fatherland:

Lobt Gott, ihr frommen Christen.
Freut euch und jubiliert
Mit David dem Psalmisten ...
Die Harfen hört man klingen
In deutscher Nation,
Darum viel Christen dringen
Zum Evangelion.

Translation:

Praise God, you pious Christians.
Rejoice and jubilate
With David, who wrote the psalms, ...
Harps resound
In Germany,
As many Christians start following
The gospel.

=== Scene 4 ===
The peasant army has captured the Helfensteins, marching the Count to execution and humiliating the Countess. Asked for their demands, one of the peasants replies, amongst others, that they do not accept any ruler save the emperor ("Kein Herrscher gilt / Als der Kaiser"). Mathis remonstrates and is beaten down. The federal army arrives and the disheartened peasants prepare for battle but are quickly overrun; Schwalb is killed and Mathis barely saved by the Countess. He flees with the orphaned Regina.

=== Scene 5 ===
Albrecht discusses his debts and Luther's challenge with Capito and agrees to interview a rich bride. He is astonished when Ursula enters and, dubious of her avowals, reproaches her for lending herself to the scheme. She admits that she is motivated not by love but by her faith to attempt his conversion, and in turn reproaches him for his vacillations and his lack of vision. He appears to be profoundly moved by her plea, but when the others are called in he announces that he will reform his ways by striving to return to his vows and to lead a simple life.

=== Scene 6 ===
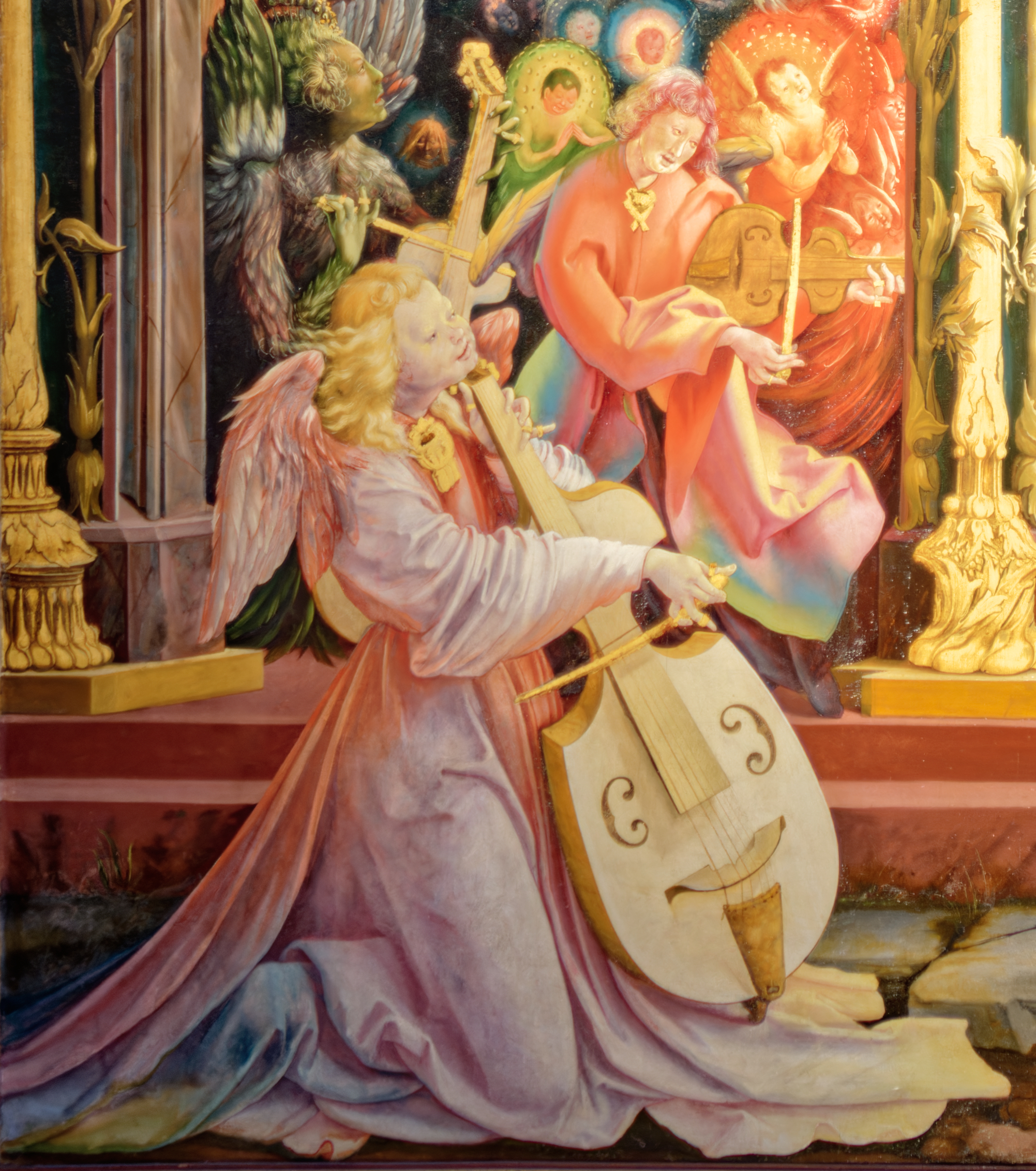

In the Odenwald forest Mathis lulls the haunted Regina to sleep with a description of a concert of angels, she joining in the folksong "Es sungen drei Engel" (this is the music of the symphony's first movement). No sooner is she asleep but Mathis, now in the garb of Grünewald's Saint Anthony, is beset by tempters: a figure resembling the Countess Helfenstein offers a life of luxury; Pommersfelden praises power over money; Ursula appears in the guises of a beggar, then a seductress and, led to the scaffold, as a martyr; Capito, now a scholar, tells 'Anthony' the world can be mastered by science and reproaches him for unobjectivity; Schwalb upbraids for his unwarlike compassion. The chorus unite in an enactment of the temptation scene of the Isenheim Altarpiece before the scene suddenly changes to that of Anthony's visit to St. Paul the Simple. Paul/Albrecht consoles Anthony/Mathis and calls him to his duty: "go forth and paint".

=== Scene 7 ===
Ursula cares for the dying Regina, who confuses Mathis' painting of the dying Christ with her father. Only the sight of Mathis calms her before she dies. In the morning (following the interlude from the Symphony) he is visited by Albrecht who offers his home, but Mathis prefers to spend his last days in solitude. Packing his trunk, he bids farewell to good intentions – a scroll, ambition – compass and ruler, creation – paints and brush, acclaim – a gold chain, questioning – books, and last, kissing a ribbon from Ursula – to love.

== List of musical numbers ==
Number	Performed by	Title (German)	Title (English)
Overture	orchestra	Engelkonzert	Angelic Concert
Scene 1 Aria	Mathis	Sonniges Land. Mildes Drängen schon nahen Sommers...	
Aria	Schwalb	Aufmachen! Helft uns!	Open the door! Help us!
Aria	Mathis	Woher kommt ihr denn? Was für Leute seid ihr?	
Aria	Regina	Es wollt ein Maidlein waschen gehen...	
Aria	Schwalb	Was redest du da?	
Aria	Regina	Staub am Himmel, Pferdetraben	
Scene 2 Chorus	Citizens	Dem Volk stopft man die falschen Lehren ins Maul	
Aria	Albrecht	Nach dem Lärm vieler Orte	
Aria	Albrecht	Man fühlt den Segen, der auf eurem Land ruht	
Aria	Albrecht	Gewinnst du auch mein Herz	
Aria	Pomerianians	Rom verzieh oft, was ihr euch an Freiheit nahmt	
Aria	Albrecht	Was gibt’s?	
Scene 3			
Scene 4			
Scene 5			
Scene 6			
Scene 7			

== Recordings ==
- 1977: EMI Classical 555 237-2 (CD issue): Rafael Kubelík (cond.), Bavarian Radio Symphony Orchestra & Chorus. Dietrich Fischer-Dieskau (Mathis), James King (Cardinal Albrecht), Ursula Koszut, William Cochran, Peter Meven, Rose Wagemann, Donald Grobe, Gerd Feldhoff, Alexander Malta, Trudeliese Schmidt.
- 1990: Wergo WER 6255-2: Gerd Albrecht (cond.), WDR Symphony Orchestra Cologne & Chorus. Josef Protschka, Roland Hermann, Victor von Halem, Hermann Winkler, Harald Stamm, Sabine Hass, Heinz Kruse, Ulrich Hielscher, Ulrich Reß, Gabriele Rossmanith, Marilyn Schmiege.
- 2005: Oehms Classics OC 908: Simone Young, Hamburg Philharmonic Symphony and chorus. Falk Struckmann, Scott MacAllister, Susan Anthony, Inga Kalna, Pär Lindskog. 2005 Hamburg staging. (Libretto not included in booklet.)
- 2012: Naxos (2 DVDs): Theater an der Wien: Mathis – Wolfgang Koch, Albrecht von Brandenburg – Kurt Streit, Riedinger – Franz Grundheber, Ursula – Manuela Uhl, Hans Schwalb – Raymond Very, Regina – Katerina Tretyakova, Lorenz von Pommersfelden – Martin Snell, Wolfgang Capito – Charles Reid, Sylvester von Schaumberg – Oliver Ringelhahn, Truchsess von Waldburg – Ben Connor, Helfenstein’s Piper – Andrew Owens, Countess Helfenstein – Magdalena Anna Hofmann, Slovak Philharmonic Chorus (chorus master: Blanka Juhaňáková), Vienna Symphony Orchestra, Bertrand de Billy, conductor, (Keith Warner – stage director, Johan Engels – set designer, Emma Ryott – costume designer, Mark Jonathan – lighting designer).
