= Gwendolyn Killebrew =

American operatic contralto (1941–2021)

- Killebrew, around 1980
- Born: August 26, 1941; Philadelphia, Pennsylvania, U.S.
- Died: December 24, 2021 (aged 80); Düsseldorf, Germany
- Education: Juilliard School
- Occupations: Operatic contralto; Operatic mezzo-soprano; Voice teacher
- Organization: Deutsche Oper am Rhein
- Title: Kammersängerin
- Awards: Metropolitan Opera National Council Auditions
- Website: www.gwendolynkillebrew.com/vitae.html

Gwendolyn Killebrew (August 26, 1941 (Note: Other sources have 1939.) – December 24, 2021) was an American operatic contralto and mezzo-soprano who worked in Germany and internationally, including the Metropolitan Opera and the Bayreuth Festival. She performed in the 1971 world premiere of Ginastera's Beatrix Cenci for the opening of the new opera house of Kennedy Center in Washington, D.C. She was a member of the Deutsche Oper am Rhein from 1976 to 2006, where she took part in the world premiere of Klebe's Gervaise Macquart, and performed in other contemporary operas. After retirement, she worked as a music educator, giving master classes and teaching privately.

== Early life and education ==
Killebrew was born in Philadelphia, Pennsylvania, on August 26, 1941. She studied piano and horn at Temple University in Philadelphia, receiving a bachelor's degree in music education in 1963, and worked as a music teacher and music therapist. She studied voice at the Juilliard School in New York with Hans Heinz and Christopher West.

== Career ==
In 1965 Killebrew participated in the Aspen Music Festival and School, appearing in the role of the Mother in Stravinsky's Mavra. She won a competition in Belgium in 1966 and was also a winner in the Metropolitan Opera National Council Auditions that year. She was engaged at the Metropolitan Opera (Met) in 1967, and made her debut as Waltraute in Wagner's Die Walküre in a new production conducted and directed by Herbert von Karajan, with Birgit Nilsson in the title role, Thomas Stewart as Wotan, Jon Vickers as Siegmund, Gundula Janowitz as Sieglinde, Karl Ridderbusch as Hunding and Christa Ludwig as Fricka. It was aired live in 1968 as a Saturday afternoon radio broadcast from the Met, in a performance conducted by Berislav Klobučar and with Leonie Rysanek as Sieglinde. She appeared as a guest at the San Francisco Opera, with the Opera Company of Boston and at La Monnaie in Brussels. In 1968, she performed the title role of Bizet's Carmen at the Bavarian State Opera in Munich. When the new opera house of Kennedy Center in Washington, D.C., was opened on September 10, 1971, she performed in the world premiere of Ginastera's Beatrix Cenci. Killebrew appeared as Amneris in Verdi's Aida at the Salzburg Easter Festival from 1972. She participated in the world premiere of Orff's De temporum fine comoedia at the 1973 Salzburg Festival. She was Carmen again at the Santa Fe Opera in 1975, and at the Met in 1979.

Killebrew was a member of the Deutsche Oper am Rhein from 1976 to 2006, and continued to perform there as a guest after that date. Her voice covered a wide range from contralto to mezzo-soprano. She frequently appeared there in contemporary operas. In 1986, she was Leonardo's Wife in Fortner's Bluthochzeit, in 1988 Frau Leimberger in Klebe's Der Jüngste Tag, in 1991 Beroë in Henze's Die Bassariden, and in 1993 Marcolfa in Fortner's In seinem Garten liebt Don Perlimplin Belisa. In 1995, she took part in the world premiere of Klebe's Gervaise Macquart, and in 1998 in the German premiere of Giorgio Battistelli's Orchesterprobe. Roles at the Deutsche Oper also included Mrs. Quickly in Verdi's Falstaff, Annina in Der Rosenkavalier by Richard Strauss, Amelfa in Rimsky-Korsakov's Der goldene Hahn, and Burija in Janáček's Jenůfa. She also appeared there as Isabella in Rossini's L'italiana in Algeri, and as Verdi's Maddalena in Rigoletto and Azucena in Il trovatore. She performed in Monteverdi operas, as Ericlea in Il ritorno d'Ulisse in patria in 2003, and as Nutrice in L'incoronazione di Poppea in 2004. She was named Kammersängerin by the Deutsche Oper am Rhein in 1988. Her last performance there was as Bacchis in Offenbach's La belle Hélène in 2009, directed by Christof Loy. She was named an honorary member of the house in 2011.

From 1978, Killebrew appeared at the Bayreuth Festival, performing roles in the Jahrhundertring, the centenary performance of Wagner's Der Ring des Nibelungen staged by Patrice Chéreau. She appeared as Schwertleite in Die Walküre and as Waltraute in Götterdämmerung, also in the version filmed in 1980. She appeared as Fricka in the Ring cycle at the Opéra de Monte-Carlo in 1979.

Killebrew was also active in concert and as a recitalist. She performed the role of Waldtaube in Schönberg's Gurre-Lieder at the Proms in 1981, with the BBC Symphony Orchestra and choirs conducted by Michael Gielen, and alongside Philip Langridge, John Tomlinson, Günther Reich, Jessye Norman, and Wolfgang Neumann. After retirement from performing, she worked as a music educator, giving master classes and teaching privately.

She died in Düsseldorf on December 24, 2021.

== Recordings ==
Killebrew recorded in 1970 the title role of Handel's Tamerlano in Copenhagen, with conductor John Moriarty. A reviewer of a reissue noted in 2003:

As Tamerlano, Killebrew has a strong and resonant voice; it rings at the top and has a defined chest voice adding powerful presence to her characterisation – her aria Vuo dar pace in Act I Scene II announces singing of real presence.

In 1976, she took part in a live recording of Dvořák's Rusalka, with Bohumil Gregor conducting Het Omroeporkest, singing the roles of the Foreign Princess and Ježibaba, alongside Teresa Stratas in the title role and Ivo Zidek as the prince.

In 1986, she recorded Mahler's Third Symphony with the Cologne Radio Symphony Orchestra conducted by Gary Bertini. Lewis M. Smoley wrote in a book comparing recordings of the Mahler symphonies that she "has a deep, rich, if heavyish, timbre that suits the profound, other-worldly atmosphere of Nietzsche's poetry".
