= The Maid of Orleans (play) =

1801 tragedy by Friedrich Schiller

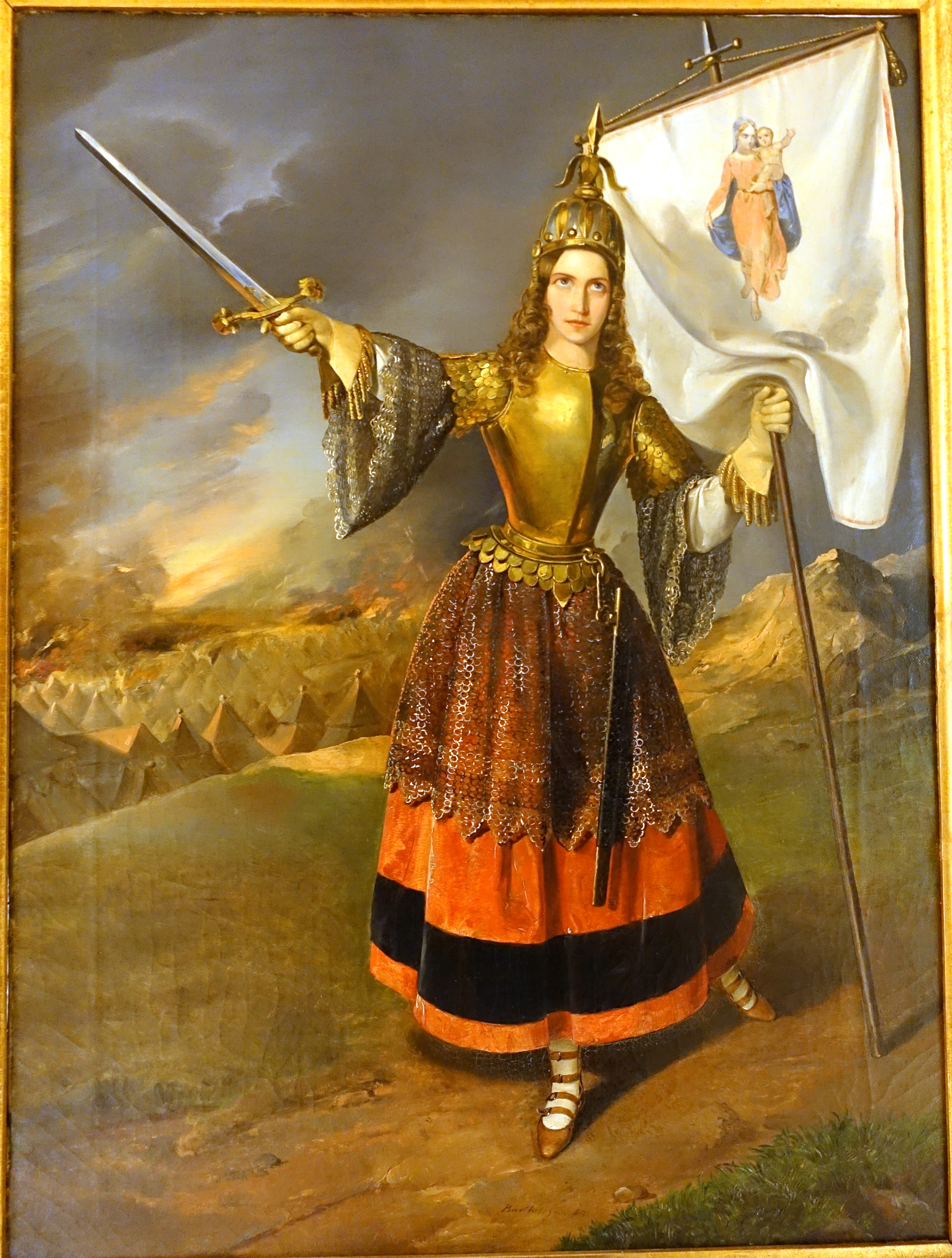
Maid of Orleans, a mid-19th century production in Braunschweig

The Maid of Orleans (German: Die Jungfrau von Orleans, pronounced [diː ˈjʊŋfʁaʊ fɔn ʔɔʁleˈɑ̃ː]) is a tragedy by Friedrich Schiller, premiered on 11 September 1801 in Leipzig. During his lifetime, it was one of Schiller's most frequently-performed pieces.

== Plot ==
The play loosely follows the life of Joan of Arc. It contains a prologue introducing the important characters, followed by five acts. Each dramatizes a significant event in Joan's life. Up to act 4 the play departs from history in only secondary details (e.g. by having Joan kill people in battle, and by shifting the reconciliation between the Armagnacs and the Burgundians from 1435 to 1430). Thereafter, however, the plot is entirely free. Joan is about to kill an English knight when, on removing his helmet, she at once falls in love with him, and spares him. Blaming herself for what she regards as a betrayal of her mission, then, when at Reims she is publicly accused of sorcery, she refuses to defend herself, is assumed to be guilty, and dismissed from the French court and army. Captured by the English, she witnesses from her prison cell a battle in which the French are being decisively defeated, breaks her bonds, and dashes out to save the day. She dies as victory is won, her honour and her reputation both restored.

The line Mit der Dummheit kämpfen Götter selbst vergebens (III, 6; Talbot) translates into English as "Against stupidity, the gods themselves battle in vain." This provided Isaac Asimov with the title of his novel The Gods Themselves.

== Operatic adaptations ==
- Giovanna d'Arco (1821) by Zinaida Volkonskaya
- Giovanna d'Arco (1830) by Giovanni Pacini
- Giovanna d'Arco (1845) by Giuseppe Verdi
- The Maid of Orleans (1881) by Pyotr Ilyich Tchaikovsky
- Das Mädchen aus Domrémy (1976) by Giselher Klebe

The English composer William Sterndale Bennett's Piano Sonata, Op. 46 (1873), is titled The Maid of Orleans with direct reference to Schiller's play, and includes quotations from the play at the head of each movement. In the 1870's the composer-pianist Moritz Moszkowski also wrote a four-movement symphonic poem on the play.
