= Ernst Gutstein =

Austrian operatic baritone (1924–1998)

- Gutstein playing Jochanaan in Salome, 1963
- Born: 15 May 1924; Vienna, Austria
- Died: 24 February 1998 (aged 73); Vienna, Austria
- Education: Akademie für Musik und darstellende Kunst Wien
- Occupations: Opera singer (baritone); Academic voice teacher

Ernst Gutstein (15 May 1924 – 24 February 1998) was an Austrian operatic baritone. He made an international career and also performed regularly at the Vienna State Opera. His repertoire included both tragic and comic characters, one of his signature roles being Faninal in Der Rosenkavalier by Richard Strauss. Gutstein created several roles in world premieres, such as Fortner's Perlimplin at the 1962 Schwetzingen Festival.

== Life and career ==
Born in Vienna, Gutstein studied singing at the Akademie für Musik und darstellende Kunst Wien with Josef Witt and the baritone Hans Duhan, among others. His debut as an opera singer took place in 1948 at the Landestheater Innsbruck as Don Fernando in Beethoven's Fidelio. Engagements followed at the Theater Hagen (1952–1953), the Theater Heidelberg (1953–1954) and the Staatstheater Kassel (1954–1958). In the 1958/59 season he sang at the Deutsche Oper am Rhein in Düsseldorf and Duisburg. From 1959 to 1962 he was a member of the Oper Frankfurt where he was awarded the title of Kammersänger in 1963.

From 1963 Gutstein belonged to the ensemble of the Vienna State Opera. He performed there in almost 20 different roles in a total of 125 performances, including the Count in Mozart's Le nozze di Figaro, Bartolo in Rossini's Der Barbier von Sevilla, Telramund in Wagner's Lohengrin and Faninal in Der Rosenkavalier by Richard Strauss, considered as one of his signature roles. He also took on character parts from the German repertoire and contemporary music, including the music teacher in Ariadne auf Naxos by Richard Strauss, Doctor Schön in Alban Berg's Lulu, Alfred Ill in Gottfried von Einem's The Visit of the Old Lady, and several roles in his Der Prozeß. In the 1995/96 season, he appeared there again in two performances as theatre director La Roche in Capriccio by Richard Strauss.

Under the direction of Albert Moser (1963–1973), Gutstein was also engaged by the Wiener Volksoper. In December 1965 he appeared as Janus in Moniuszko's Halka. In January 1967 he sang Sebastiano in d'Albert's Tiefland, alongside Rudolf Schock. In February 1972 he sang the title role in a new musical version of the opera König Nicolo by Rudolf Weishappel. In the spring of 1972 followed Wolf-Ferrari's I quatro rusteghi; in November 1972 Gutstein appeared as Peter in Humperdinck's Hänsel und Gretel. Other roles at the Volksoper included Kruschina in Smetana's Die verkaufte Braut in 1973, Fadenkreutz in Blacher's Preußisches Märchen in 1978, and the Brazilian in Offenbach's La vie parisienne in 1980. In 1975, Gutstein sang Claude Frollo in Franz Schmidt's rarely performed Notre Dame.

Gutstein first appeared at the Salzburg Festival in 1959 as Ernesto in Haydn's Il mondo della luna, a role originally written for a castrato. He returned there in 1978 and 1979 as Faninal.

In the 1960s, Gutstein appeared several times at the Komische Oper Berlin in productions by Walter Felsenstein. In the 1960/61 season he appeared as Germont in Verdi's La traviata and as Jago in his Othello, alongside Anny Schlemm as Desdemona. In the 1966/67 season he performed the title role of Mozart's Don Giovanni. In 1964 at the Oper Frankfurt, he sang the title role in Verdi's Macbeth alongside Inge Borkh, staged by Harry Buckwitz.

Gutstein made guest appearances at the Royal Opera House Covent Garden in London (in 1986 as Graf Waldner), the Metropolitan Opera in New York City (in 1979 and 1980 as Faninal), the Dallas Opera (in 1982 as Faninal) and the Houston Grand Opera (in 1990 as Faninal); at the Glyndebourne Festival, he performed in 1985 and again in 1989 as Waldner alongside Elisabeth Glauser, and in 1987 and 1990 as La Roche. In 1997, he sang the role of prison warden Frank in Die Fledermaus by Johann Strauss at the Schlossfestspiele in Schönbrunn Palace.

Gutstein was known for the acting skills which he brought to his opera roles. The critic from El Ciervo described his interpretation of La Roche in Capriccio as "unforgettable" and showing "absolute mastery of the role", and both John Steane and Stanley Sadie praised his portrayal of the impoverished aristocrat Count Waldner in Arabella. He also sang in the world premieres of several contemporary operas: as Perlimplin in Fortner's In seinem Garten liebt Don Perlimplin Belisa at the Schwetzingen Festival in 1962; the title role in the stage version of Henze's Ein Landarzt at Frankfurt opera in 1965; as Graf von Stoffeln in Josef Matthias Hauer's Die schwarze Spinne at the Theater an der Wien in 1966; and as Old Mahon in Klebe's Ein wahrer Held at the Opernhaus Zürich in 1975.

After retiring from the stage, Gutstein became a professor at the Vienna Musikakademie, teaching there until shortly before his death at the age of 73. Several recordings of his performances on radio and record have been reissued. He appeared in a live recording of excerpts from Verdi's Macbeth in Frankfurt, reviewed a highly motivated singer-actor, with the dark timbre of a full and mature heldenbaritone, with almost no limits in the high register ("... hoch motivierten Sängerdarsteller mit der dunklen Farbe eines vollen, reifen, auch in der Höhe kaum Grenzen kennenden Heldenbaritons ...").
