= Die Räuber (opera) =

1957 opera by Giselher Klebe based on Schiller's play

- Opera by Giselher Klebe
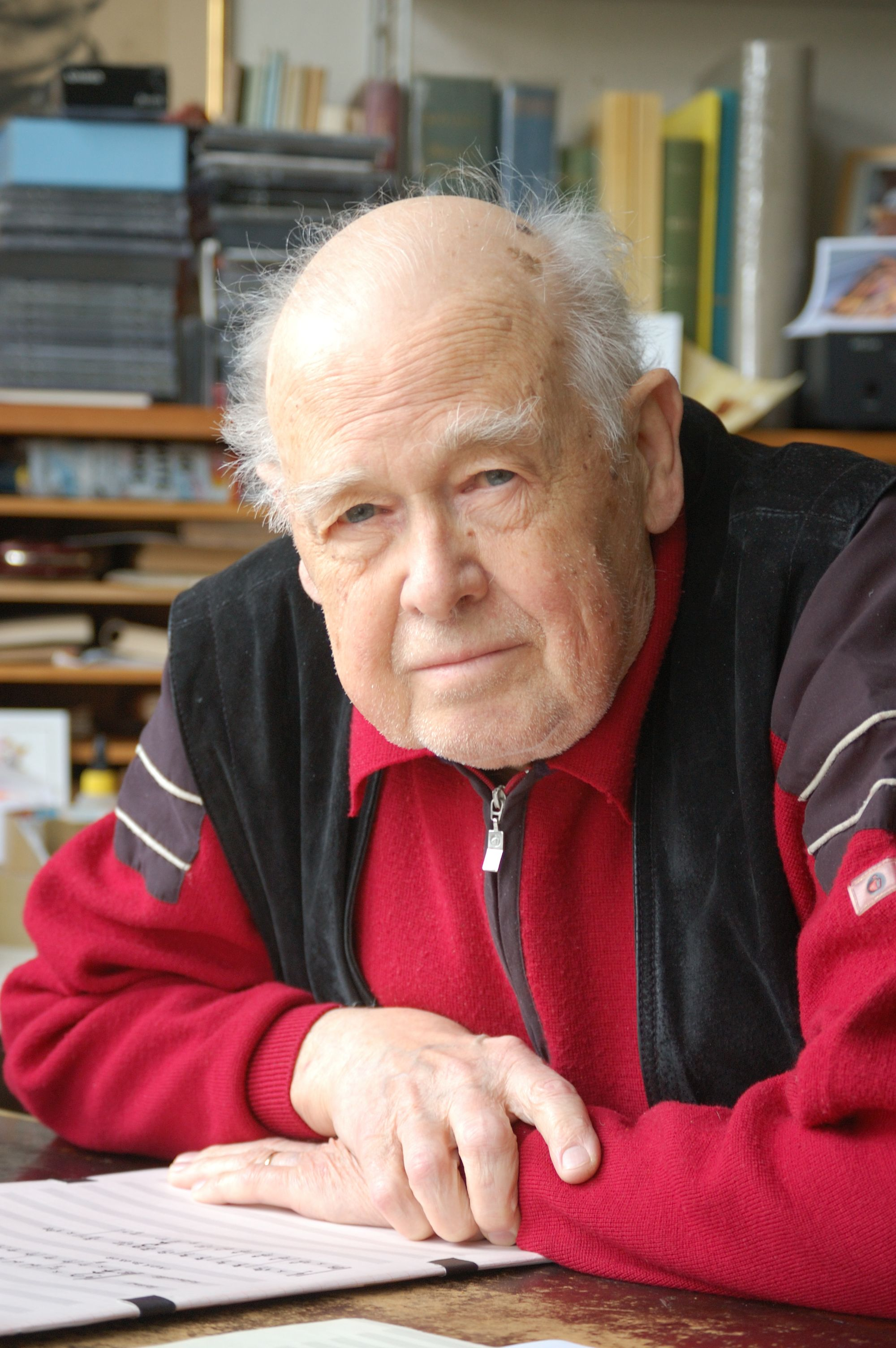
- The composer in 2008
- Translation: The Robbers
- Librettist: Klebe
- Language: German
- Based on: Die Räuber by Friedrich Schiller
- Premiere: 3 June 1957; Deutsche Oper am Rhein, Düsseldorf

Die Räuber (The Robbers), Op. 25, is an opera in four acts by Giselher Klebe who also wrote the libretto based on the play by Friedrich Schiller. The composition uses the twelve-tone technique.

It premiered on 3 June 1957 at the Deutsche Oper am Rhein, Düsseldorf. It is dedicated to the memory of Giuseppe Verdi. It was written between 1951 and 1956, and revised in 1961/1962.

== Roles ==
- The old Count von Moor (bass, Helmut Fehn)
- Karl (dramatic tenor, Walter Beißner) and Franz (character baritone, Wilhelm Walter Dicks), his sons
- Amalia von Edelreich, old Moor's niece (dramatic soprano, Elisabeth Schwarzenberg)
- Hermann, a nobleman (lyric tenor)
- Schweizer, a libertine, later a robber (character bass)
- A Monk (contralto)
- Daniel, an old servant (lyric tenor)
- The libertines, later robbers; voices (backstage)

Time and place: Germany in the middle of the 18th century
