= Op. 69 =

In music, Op. 69 stands for Opus number 69. Compositions that are assigned this number include:

- Beethoven – Cello Sonata No. 3
- Britten – Cantata misericordium
- Chopin – Waltz in A-flat major, Op. 69, No. 1
- Chopin – Waltz in B minor, Op. 69, No. 2
- Dvořák – The Spectre's Bride
- Elgar – The Music Makers
- Klebe – Ein wahrer Held
- Schumann – Romanzen volume I (6 partsongs for women's voices)
- Shostakovich – Children's Notebook
- Sibelius – Two Serenades, concertante works for violin and orchestra (1912–1913)
- Tchaikovsky – Iolanta
