= Op. 78 =

In music, Op. 78 stands for Opus number 78. Compositions that have been assigned this number include:

- Beethoven – Piano Sonata No. 24
- Brahms – Violin Sonata No. 1
- Dvořák – Symphonic Variations
- Fauré – Sicilienne
- Klebe – Das Rendezvous
- Saint-Saëns – Symphony No. 3
- Schubert – Piano Sonata in G major, D 894
- Schumann – 4 duets (soprano and tenor)
- Tchaikovsky – The Voyevoda
