= Yvonne Ciannella =

American opera singer (1926–2022)

- Yvonne Cianella, in 1975
- Born: July 25, 1926; New York City, U.S.
- Died: March 1, 2022 (aged 95)
- Education: Queens College; Mozarteum Salzburg
- Occupations: Classical coloratura soprano; Academic teacher
- Organizations: Robert Shaw Chorale; Theater Dortmund; Florida State University

Yvonne Regina Ciannella (July 25, 1926 – March 1, 2022) was an American coloratura soprano in opera and concert. She began her career performing and recording with the Robert Shaw Chorale in the early 1950s. After graduate voice studies at the Mozarteum in Salzburg, she embarked on a career as an opera singer; working mainly in Germany at the Staatstheater Braunschweig, Theater Bonn, and Theater Dortmund during the 1960s. She also appeared as a guest artist with opera companies in Berlin, Cologne, Florida, Frankfurt, Hamburg, and Vienna. For many years she was a member of the voice faculty of the College of Music at Florida State University.

== Career ==
Born in New York City, Ciannella earned a Bachelor of Music degree in vocal performance from Queens College, City University of New York. A Fulbright Scholarship enabled her to pursue further studies in voice at the Mozarteum University of Salzburg in Austria. She became a regular soloist with the Robert Shaw Chorale (RSC) during the early 1950s, singing for example the soprano part in Mozart's Requiem in 1951. She toured with the group, singing in the same program also excerpts from Gershwin's Porgy and Bess in Ann Arbor, Michigan. She also performed the part of the Archangel Gabriel in Haydn's The Creation in Carnegie Hall with the RSC in 1953. She was a featured soloist on the 1950 album Christmas With the Robert Shaw Chorale.

In 1951 Ciannella was the soprano soloist in Haydn's Missa brevis Sancti Joannis de Deo with the Interracial Fellowship Chorus (IFC) under conductor Harold Aks at Town Hall in Manhattan. In 1955 she performed the role of the Israelite woman in Handel's Judas Maccabaeus with Walter Carringer in the title role, Betty Allen as the Israelite messenger, the IFC, and Aks conducting. That same year she was a featured soloist in a concert of Monteverdi's Vespro della Beata Vergine at Carnegie Hall with the Dessoff Choirs under conductor Paul Boeppl. In 1963 she was the soprano soloist in Handel's Messiah with The Masterwork Chorus and Orchestra at Carnegie Hall under conductor Thomas Dunn.

Ciannella worked in Germany as an opera singer; performing mostly Italian repertoire as a resident artist at opera houses like the Staatstheater Braunschweig, Theater Bonn, and Theater Dortmund. As a member of the latter institution, she appeared in the title role of Donizetti's Lucia di Lammermoor in 1964. In a Jugendkonzert (Concert for young people) in the Marienkirche, offering music by Bach, Marcello and Purcell, she performed on 22 November 1965 Bach's solo cantata Ich bin vergnügt mit meinem Glücke, BWV 84, conducted by Hans Herbert Jöris. In the 1968–69 season, she performed Leonora in Verdi's Il trovatore as a guest artist. She also performed as a guest artist in leading roles with the Berlin State Opera, the Cologne Opera, the Oper Frankfurt, the Hamburg State Opera and the Vienna State Opera.

Ciannella returned to the U.S. in 1969 to teach at the Florida State University. In Florida, she appeared in 1974 as Leonora in Il trovatore, and in the title roles of Puccini's Madama Butterfly and Suor Angelica. In recital, she performed Lieder by Schubert, Wolf and Ravel.

== Recording ==
Ciannella sang in 1967 the vocal part in a recording of Telemann's cantata Ino, with the Bach-Collegium Stuttgart conducted by Helmuth Rilling. Stanley Sadie commented in the Gramophone in January 1968: "Yvonne Ciannella on this new version isn't as sheerly beautiful a singer as Miss Janowitz, but her performance is a lot more colourful and dramatic. ... I am surprised I have not heard of Miss Ciannella before – it's a musical voice, intelligently used, warm and soft in timbre for the most part but capable of firm attack and a good deal of dramatic colouring." Also with Rilling, she recorded Telemann's opera Pimpinone with Erich Wenk in 1983.

== Personal life and death ==
Ciannella died on March 1, 2022, at the age of 95.
