= Hans Herbert Jöris =

German conductor and academic teacher

- Born: 15 May 1925; Viersen, Germany
- Died: 18 January 2008 (aged 82); Hannover, Germany
- Education: Musikhochschule Köln
- Occupations: Conductor; Academic teacher
- Organizations: Theater Dortmund; Staatsoper Hannover; Hochschule für Musik, Theater und Medien Hannover

Hans Herbert Jöris (also Hans-Herbert; 15 May 1925 – 18 January 2008) was a German conductor and academic teacher who worked at the Theater Dortmund and the Staatsoper Hannover and taught at the Hochschule für Musik, Theater und Medien Hannover.

== Career ==
Born in Viersen, Jöris was the first son of Hans Jöris, a Kirchenmusikdirektor, and his wife Adele Jöris (née Franken). He took lessons in violin, piano and organ as a child. From 1931, he attended the Diergardtschule and then the gymnasium in Viersen, finishing with the Abitur in 1943. He was drafted into the Wehrmacht and was a prisoner of war, returning to Viersen in 1945. Jöris studied conducting at the Musikhochschule Köln with Günter Wand.

Jöris became Wand's assistant with the Gürzenich Orchestra. He conducted the Ford-Sinfonieorchester from 1951 to 1959 as the first professional. He was also the conductor of the Chor des Westdeutschen Rundfunks, and worked for the Unterhaltungsorchester of the NDR with chief conductor Franz Marszalek.

In 1955, Jöris became the conductor of the chamber orchestra of Dortmund and later Kapellmeister at the Städtische Bühnen Dortmund. He conducted the world premiere of Gunther Schuller's Movements for flute and string orchestra on 19 May 1962, with soloist Hans-Jürgen Möhring and the Dortmund Chamber Orchestra. On 22 November 1965, he conducted a Jugendkonzert (concert for young people) in the Marienkirche, offering music by Marcello, Purcell, and Bach's solo cantata Ich bin vergnügt mit meinem Glücke, BWV 84, performed by Yvonne Ciannella.

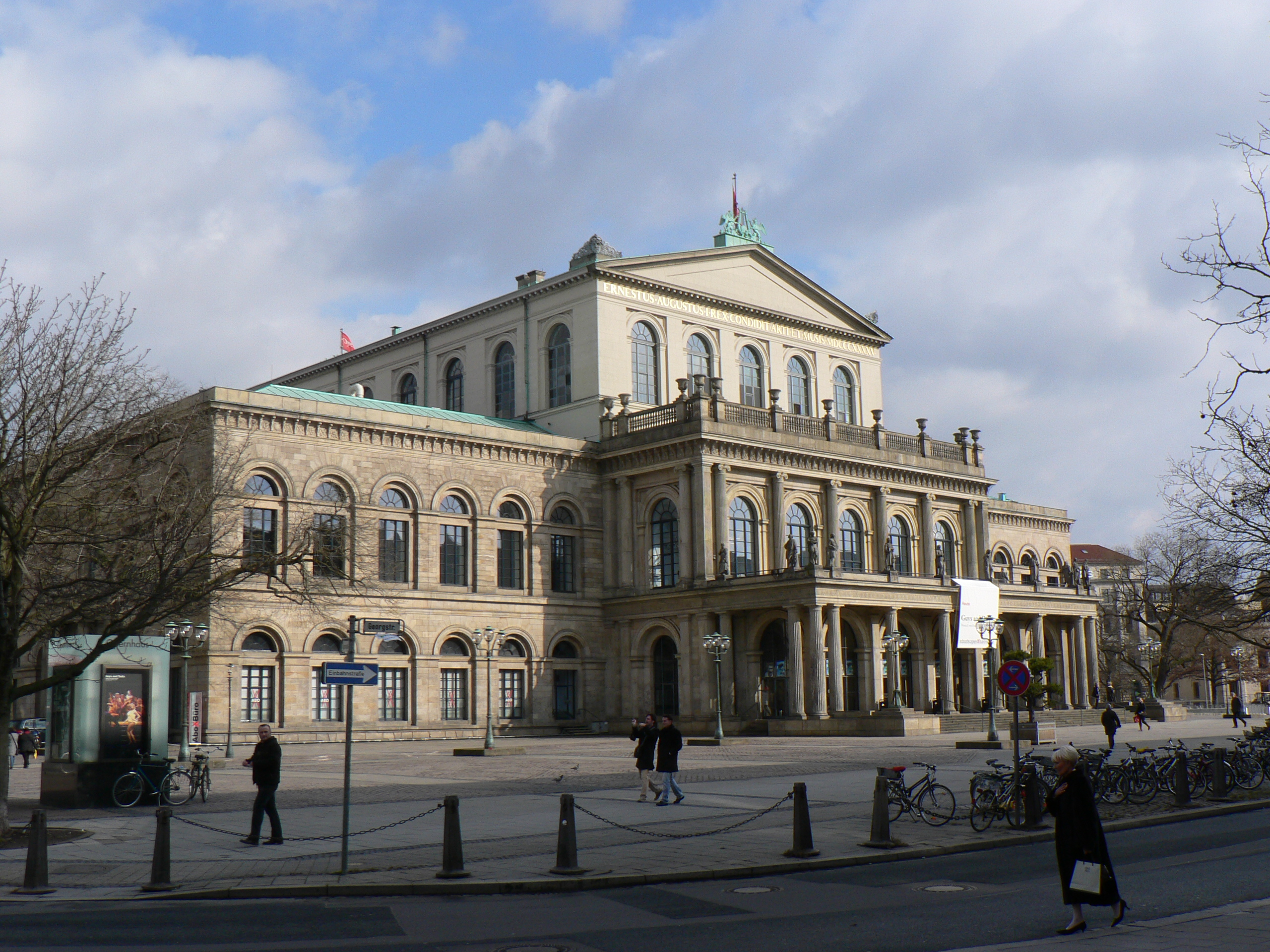
Staatsoper Hannover

In 1966, Jöris became First Kapellmeister at the Staatsoper Hannover. He conducted Witold Lutosławski's Jeux vénitiens in 1969, in a staged version choreographed by Yvonne Georgi. From 1968 to 1981, he also conducted the Niedersächsisches Jugendsinfonieorchester, the youth symphony orchestra of Lower Saxony, which he founded. He was artistic director of the Hannoverscher Oratorienchor from 1976 to 1989, touring to Breslau, Bydgoszcz, and the Grand Theatre, Poznań. Jöris conducted as a guest in Göttingen, Beijing, Shanghai and Guangzhou. At the opera house he conducted the German premiere of Hans Werner Henze's ballet Tancredi in 1975. In 1977, he conducted the world premiere of Giselher Klebe's one-act opera Das Rendezvous, composed for the 125th anniversary of the opera house and staged by Günter Roth.

He was appointed professor at the Hochschule für Musik, Theater und Medien Hannover in 1978, for conducting and as head of the opera class. He was emerited in 1990. From 1995, he wrote a documentary about the history of music and theatre in his hometown Viersen, published in 2006. He arranged songs by Siegfried Strohbach for voice and orchestra.

In 1990, Jöris served as a guest Generalmusikdirektor in Oldenburg. From 1998 to 2003, he was artistic director and chief conductor of the Rotary Orchestra, which was founded in 1995.

Jöris died in Hannover on 18 January 2008, at the age of 82.

== Publications ==
- Musik und Theater in Viersen 1848 bis 1945. Edited by Jutta Pitzen, published as Viersen, Beiträge zu einer Stadt No. 30, by Verein für Heimatpflege Viersen, Arbeitskreis für Stadtgeschichtliche Publikationen. Eckers, Viersen 2006, ISBN 3-9808779-3-0
