= Op. 149 =

In music, Op. 149 stands for Opus number 149. Compositions that are assigned this number include:

- Beach – Cabildo
- Klebe – Chlestakows Wiederkehr
