= Op. 72 =

In music, Op. 72 stands for Opus number 72. Compositions that are assigned this number include:

- Beethoven – Fidelio
- Dvořák – Slavonic Dances, Series II
- Klebe – Das Mädchen aus Domrémy
- Prokofiev – Russian Overture
- Schumann – Four Fugues (Vier Fugen) for piano
- Scriabin – Vers la flamme
- Strauss – Intermezzo
