= Yvonne, Prinzessin von Burgund =

1972 German-language opera by Boris Blacher

- Opera by Boris Blacher
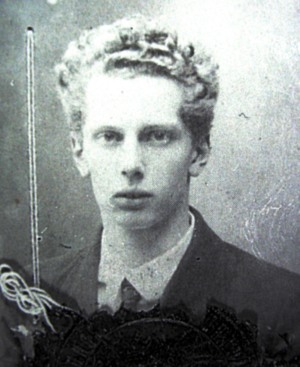
- Boris Blacher, the opera's composer photographed in 1922
- Librettist: Boris Blacher
- Language: German
- Based on: Witold Gombrowicz's 1935 play Iwona, księżniczka Burgunda
- Premiere: 15 September 1973; Opernhaus Wuppertal

Yvonne, Prinzessin von Burgund (Yvonne, Princess of Burgundy) is an opera in four acts composed by Boris Blacher to a German-language libretto by the composer based on Witold Gombrowicz's 1935 Polish play Iwona, księżniczka Burgunda (Yvonne, Burgundy Princess). Composed in 1972, it was Blacher's last opera. It premiered on 15 September 1973 at the Opernhaus Wuppertal, directed by Kurt Horres.

The story is set in the royal court of an imaginary country and combines elements of tragic farce, fantasy, and moral criticism. The title role is portrayed by a mute dancer. Pina Bausch danced the title role at the Wuppertal premiere, one of her last performances before establishing her dance company Tanztheater Wuppertal.

Gombrowicz's Iwona, księżniczka Burgunda was published in 1935 but did not receive its first performance until 1957 when it premiered in Warsaw. It has since served as the basis for four operas, of which Blacher's was the first. The others are the chamber opera Yvonne by Ulrich Wagner (b. 1967) with a German libretto, first performed in Krefeld in 1998; Iwona, księżniczka Burgunda by Zygmunt Krauze with a Polish libretto, first performed in Paris in 2004; and Yvonne, Princesse de Bourgogne by Philippe Boesmans with a French libretto, first performed at the Paris Opera in 2009.

== Roles ==
Role	Voice type
Yvonne	mute role (dancer)
King Ignatz	baritone
Queen Margarete	mezzo-soprano
Prince Philipp, heir to the throne	tenor
Chamberlain	bass-baritone
Isa, lady-in-waiting	soprano
Zyprian, Prince Philipp's friend	tenor
Two aunts of Yvonne	soprano, contralto
Innozenz, courtier	baritone
Valentin, lackey	tenor
Two ladies-in-waiting	soprano
Grand judge	baritone

== Synopsis ==
The action is set at an imaginary court at no defined time. Prince Philipp, bored by the court and its endless ceremonies, chooses Yvonne, an ugly and mute girl, as his fiancée. His parents, Queen Margarete and King Ignatz, are appalled at the engagement and the prince's choice is mocked by the courtiers. Yvonne's refusal to speak, despite repeated attempts to make her break her silence, causes even more provocation. As tension at the court mounts, King Ignatz and the Chamberlain reveal themselves to be murderers, and the courtly ceremonies become a farce. In the end, Yvonne, still silent, is killed during a banquet in her honour.

== See also ==
- Yvonne, princesse de Bourgogne
