= Kurt Horres =

German theatre director (1932–2023)

- Kurt Horres, in the 1980s
- Born: 28 November 1932; Düsseldorf, Germany
- Died: 2 January 2023 (aged 90); Düsseldorf, Germany
- Education: University of Cologne; Robert Schumann Conservatory
- Occupations: Stage director; theatre manager; academic teacher
- Organizations: Staatstheater Darmstadt; Deutsche Oper am Rhein; Folkwang University
- Awards: von der Heydt-Kulturpreis; Duisburger Musikpreis

Kurt Horres (28 November 1932 – 2 January 2023) was a German stage director, particularly of opera, and opera manager. He held positions as general manager at the Staatstheater Darmstadt, the Hamburg State Opera, and from 1986 to 1996 at the Deutsche Oper am Rhein. He focused on opera of the 20th century, including composers who had been banned during the Nazi regime, such as Korngold's Die tote Stadt, and literature operas including Gottfried von Einem's Kabale und Liebe, and the world premieres of Blacher's Yvonne, Prinzessin von Burgund, and Klebe's Das Mädchen aus Domrémy. He taught stage direction at the Folkwang University.

== Life and career ==
Horres was born in Düsseldorf on 28 November 1932. He studied German studies, theatre science, and art history at the University of Cologne and at the Robert Schumann Conservatory in Düsseldorf.

Horres began his career at the Komische Oper Berlin, assisting Walter Felsenstein. He worked as a stage director at the Wuppertal, the Cologne Opera, and Theater Bonn. He was Oberspielleiter at the Theater Lübeck until 1964, and then for eleven years opera manager at the Wuppertaler Bühnen. There he promoted literature operas by composers such as Wolfgang Fortner and Gunther Schuller. He directed the world premiere of Blacher's Yvonne, Prinzessin von Burgund on 15 September 1973, with dancer Pina Bausch in the mute title role. During his later years there, Bausch's dance theatre flourished at the same house.

His first became a general manager (Intendant) at the Staatstheater Darmstadt in 1976, with his production of Britten's Tod in Venedig being well known. In 1976, he directed the world premiere of Klebe's Das Mädchen aus Domrémy at the Staatstheater Stuttgart, and in 1980, the premiere of his Der Jüngste Tag at the Mannheim National Theatre, with Hans Wallat conducting. In 1983, he staged the world premiere of Klebe's Die Fastnachtsbeichte in Darmstadt, conducted by Hans Drewanz. In 1984, he became general manager of the Hamburg State Opera in 1984. He chose for his first production Mussorgsky's Boris Godunov, using an extremely large ensemble in order to engage with as many employees at the house as possible. However, he faced opposition from opera director Rolf Mares, who was responsible for finances, as well as with conductor Hans Zender and stage technicians who had to work extra hours. The reaction of the audience and press reviews of the premiere were disastrous, and Horres requested to have his contract ended early.

Horres became general manager of the Deutsche Oper am Rhein in Düsseldorf and Oberhausen in 1986, succeeding Grischa Barfuss. He began his tenure with Fortner's Bluthochzeit on 12 October 1986, conducted by Hans Wallat. He focused on directing, as well as managing, contemporary opera. Approximately one third of the 60 productions during his tenure were dedicated to works from the 20th century, including operas by Franz Schreker and Udo Zimmermann, as well as world premieres and German premieres. He organised a production of Wagner's Der Ring des Nibelungen in collaboration with the Cologne Opera. He directed Unter dem Milchwald by Walter Steffens and Gottfried von Einem's Kabale und Liebe, both in 1973, and Die Frau ohne Schatten by Richard Strauss in 1977. Tours took the troupe to Brussels, Moscow, and Vienna. In October 1989, shortly before the fall of the Berlin Wall, the ensemble played Korngold's Die tote Stadt and Klebe's Der Jüngste Tag at the Staatsoper Unter den Linden. He held the position until 1996. He worked as a freelance stage director, with productions at the Bavarian State Opera in Munich, Oper Frankfurt, and in Amsterdam and Stockholm.

He taught stage direction at the Folkwang University.

Horres died on 2 January 2023, at age 90 after a long serious illness. Christoph Meyer, his successor at the Deutsche Oper am Rhein, wrote in memory of what he called one of the personalities who shaped the house: "With great artistic passion, Kurt Horres worked above all as a pioneer of modernity who firmly believed in the future of opera as an art form and convinced audiences of its relevance time and again" ("Mit großer künstlerischer Leidenschaft wirkte Kurt Horres vor allem als Wegbereiter der Moderne, der fest an die Zukunft der Kunstform Oper glaubte und das Publikum immer wieder von ihrer Relevanz überzeugte").

== Awards ==
- 1973: Von der Heydt-Kulturpreis
- 1996: Duisburger Musikpreis
