= Gervaise Macquart =

1995 opera by Giselher Klebe

- Opera by Giselher Klebe
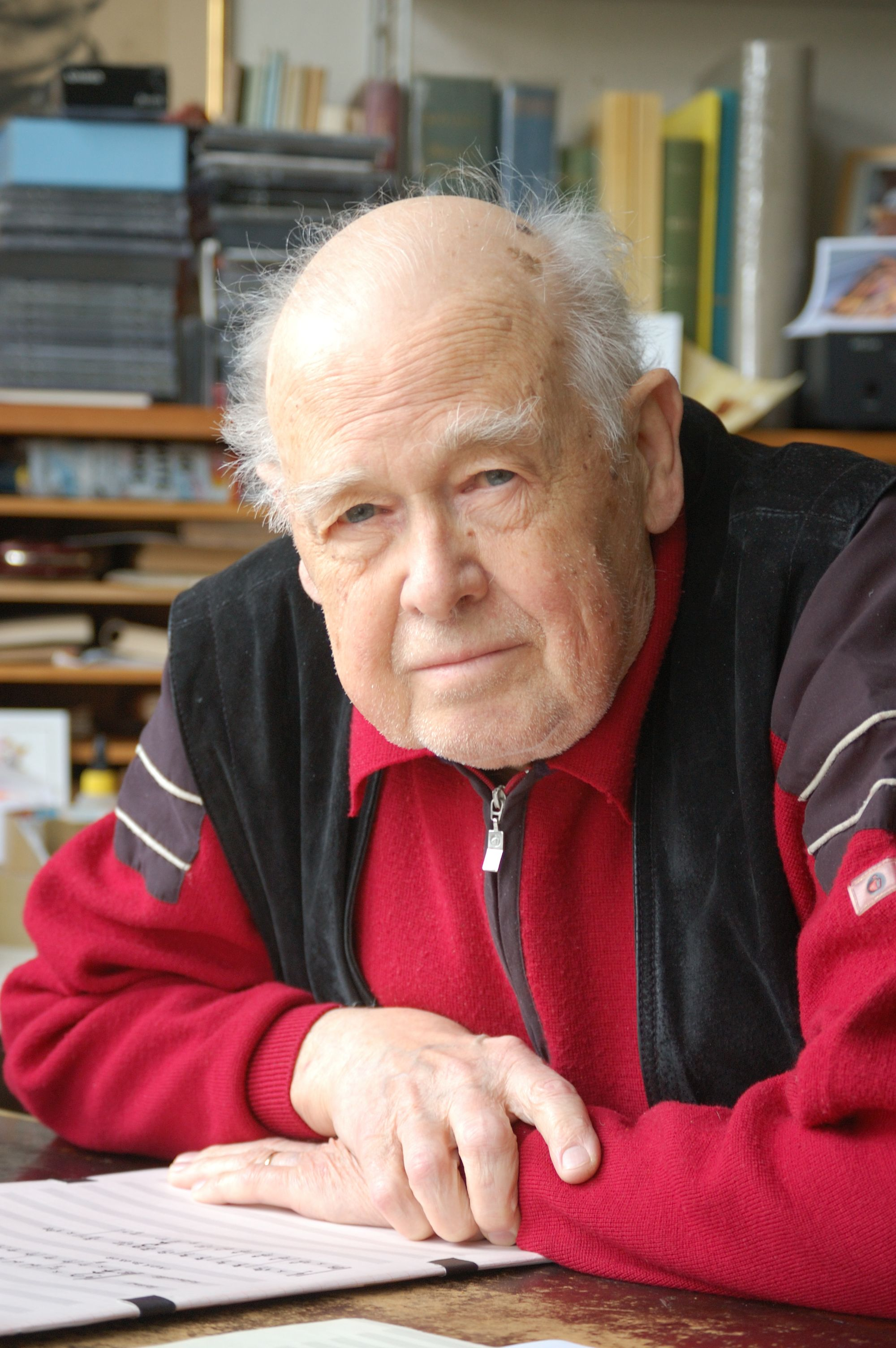
- Klebe in 2008
- Librettist: Lore Klebe
- Language: German
- Based on: L'Assommoir by Émile Zola
- Premiere: 10 November 1995; Deutsche Oper am Rhein, Düsseldorf

Gervaise Macquart, Op. 119, is an opera in two acts by Giselher Klebe. His wife, Lore Klebe, wrote the libretto based on the novel L'Assommoir in Émile Zola's series Les Rougon-Macquart.

The opera premiered on 10 November 1995 at the Deutsche Oper am Rhein, Düsseldorf, Germany, under the direction of August Everding, conducted by János Kulka, with Marta Marquez in the title role, Martha Mödl as Mother Bazouga, Markus Müller as Lantier, Richard Salter as Henri Coupeau, Stefan Heidemann as blacksmith Goujet, and Gwendolyn Killebrew as Madame Goujet.
