= Musikpreis der Stadt Duisburg =

German music prize

- Native name: Duisburger Musikpreis
- Description: International music prize awarded for outstanding achievements in the field of music
- Country: Germany
- Presented by: Köhler Osbahr Foundation / City of Duisburg
- Website: www.koehler-osbahr-stiftung.de/musikpreis/

The Musikpreis der Stadt Duisburg, also Duisburger Musikpreis was established in 1990 by the Köhler Osbahr Foundation for the Promotion of Art and Science. This international music prize is intended to highlight "outstanding achievements in the field of music". The foundation bears the endowment of 10,000 euros associated with the award.

== Laureates ==
- 1990 Nikolai Korndorf and Peter Heyworth
- 1991 Wolfgang Rihm
- 1992 Yehudi Menuhin
- 1993 Beat Furrer
- 1994 Jürg Baur and Thomas Blomenkamp
- 1995 Hans Werner Henze
- 1996 Kurt Horres
- 1997 Anne-Liese Henle (postum)
- 1998 Toshio Hosokawa
- 1999 Krzysztof Penderecki
- 2000 Josef Krings
- 2001 Christof Loy
- 2002 Frank Peter Zimmermann
- 2003 Gerhard Stäbler
- 2004 Hans van Manen
- 2005 Tan Dun
- 2006 Michael Gielen
- 2007 Dietrich Fischer-Dieskau
- 2008 Pina Bausch
- 2009 Alfred Brendel
- 2010 Hans Wallat
- 2011 Jonathan Darlington
- 2012 Fauré Quartet
- 2013 Duisburg Philharmonic
- 2014 Nina Stemme
- 2015 Martin Schläpfer
- 2016 Bruno Weil
- 2017 Fazıl Say
- 2018 Nicolas Altstaedt
- 2019 Royston Maldoom
- 2020 Carolin Widmann
- 2021 Valer Sabadus
- 2022 Youth Symphony Orchestra of Ukraine
- 2023 Alfred Wendel (Intendant Duisburg Philharmonic)
- 2024 Tanja Tetzlaff
- 2025 Axel Kober
- 2026 Igor Levit
