= Der Jüngste Tag =

Opera by Giselher Klebe

- Opera by Giselher Klebe
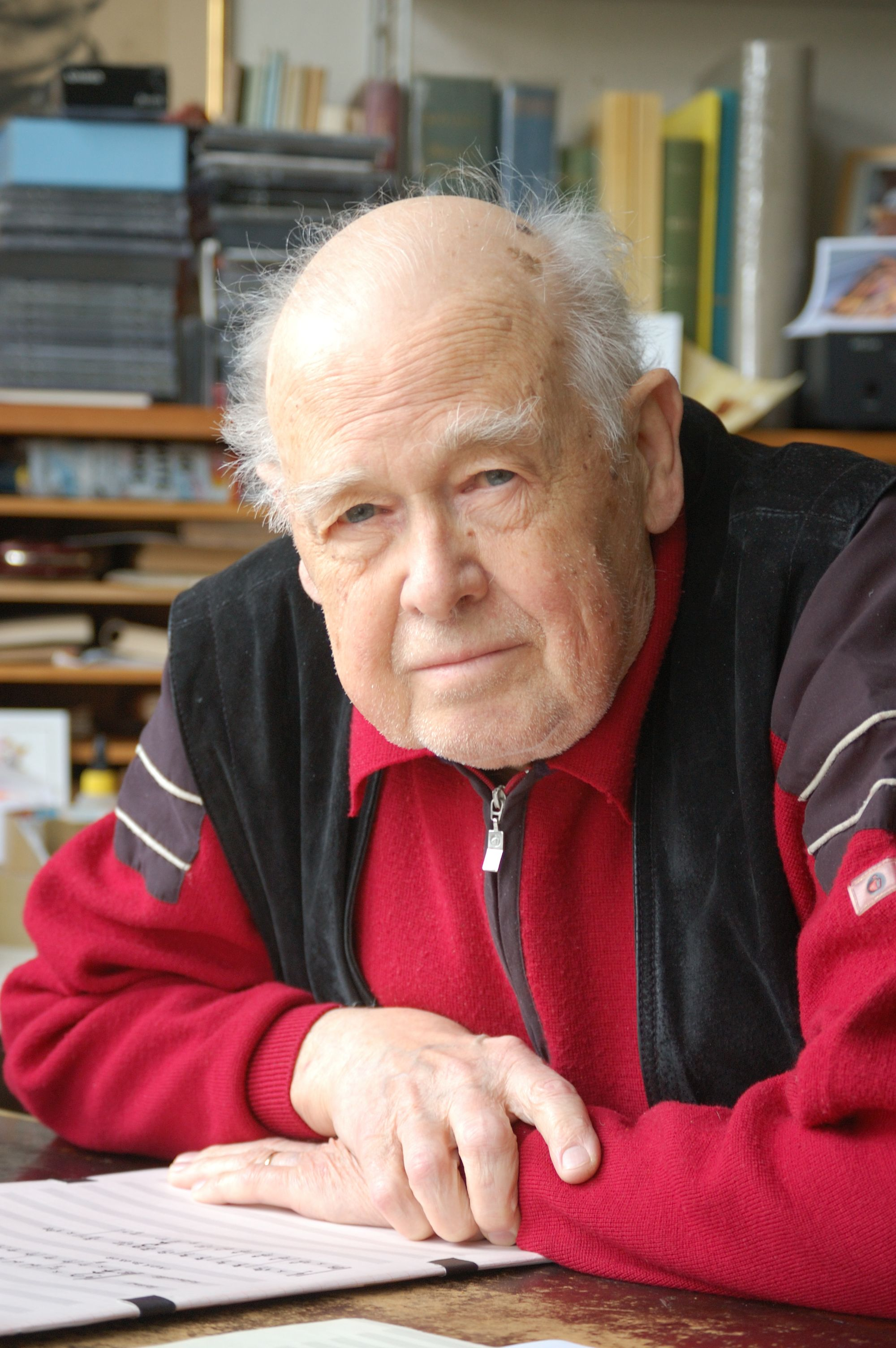
- The composer in 2008
- Translation: Carnival Confession
- Librettist: Lore Klebe
- Language: German
- Based on: Der Jüngste Tag by Ödön von Horváth
- Premiere: 1980; Nationaltheater Mannheim

Der Jüngste Tag, op.82, (Judgment Day) is an opera in three acts composed by Giselher Klebe. His wife, Lore Klebe, wrote the libretto based on the play of the same name by Ödön von Horváth.

The opera premiered in 1980 at the Nationaltheater Mannheim, directed by Kurt Horres and conducted by Hans Wallat.
