= Bluthochzeit =

- Opera by Wolfgang Fortner
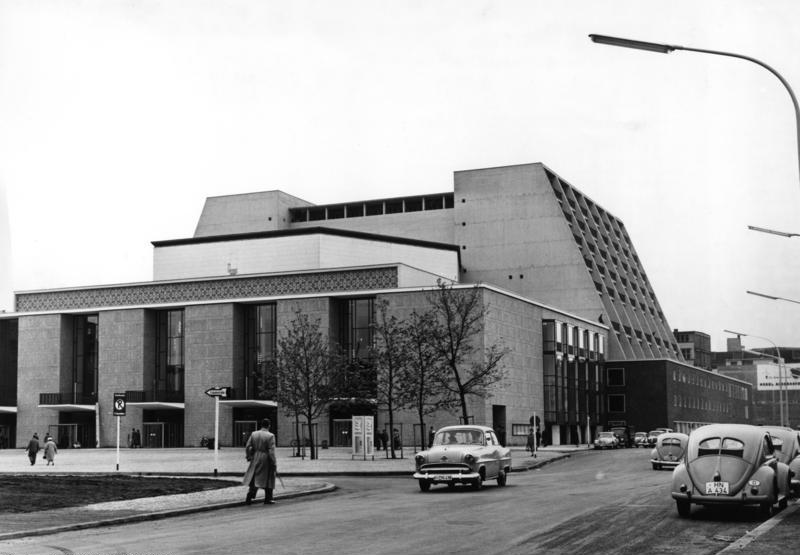
- Cologne Opera House shortly before the premiere of Bluthochzeit
- Translation: Blood Wedding
- Librettist: Wolfgang Fortner
- Language: German
- Based on: García Lorca's Bodas de sangre, translated by Enrique Beck
- Premiere: 8 June 1957; Cologne Opera

Bluthochzeit (Blood Wedding) is an opera (lyrische Tragödie) in two acts by Wolfgang Fortner. The libretto, also by Fortner, is based on Enrique Beck's German translation of García Lorca's 1933 play Bodas de sangre. It premiered at the Cologne Opera on 8 June 1957.

== Composition ==
Fortner was asked by Karl-Heinz Stroux to write incidental music for a performance of Lorca's play Bodas de sangre in Hamburg in the early 1950s. The composer was impressed by the drama and felt that acting was not enough to "sing the tragedy to an end" ("die Tragödie zu Ende zu singen"), and decided to set longer sections to music.

Fortner wrote the opera's libretto himself based on Enrique Beck's German translation of the play. Bluthochzeit, a "literary opera" like Alban Berg's Wozzeck and Lulu, is driven by the action, as the composer comments: "The compulsion of the words drives the music." He scored the work for singing and speaking parts, following the text which is at times in prose, at times in poetry. Fortner used dodecaphony but included traditional Spanish instruments, such as mandolins, castanets, tambourine and guitars. Giselher Klebe noted in an introduction to the performance in Düsseldorf that Fortner, who was exposed to twelve-tone technique rather late in life, used the restriction of its rules to heighten expressiveness.

In 1962 Fortner revised the scores of both Bluthochzeit and his 1954 dramatic scene Der Wald (The Forest) and used both of them in the score for a new opera, In seinem Garten liebt Don Perlimplin Belisa with a libretto based on another play by Garcia Lorca (Amor de Don Perlimplín con Belisa en su jardín). This new opera premiered on 10 May 1962 in a production by Cologne Opera at the Schwetzingen Festival.

== Roles ==
Roles, voice types, premiere cast
Role	Voice type	Premiere cast, 8 June 1957 Conductor: Günter Wand
The Mother	dramatic soprano	Nathalie Hinsch-Gröndahl
The Bridegroom	speaking voice	Wilhelm Otto
The Bride	soprano	Anny Schlemm
Her Father	speaking voice	Alexander Schoedler
Leonardo	baritone	Ernst Grathwol
His Wife	contralto	Emmy Lisken
Her Mother	contralto	Irmgard Gerz
The Maid	mezzo-soprano	Hildegunt Walther
The Child	soprano	Anita Westhoff
Death (a female beggar)	chanteuse	Helga Jenkel
The Moon	tenor	Gerhard Nathge
Three woodcutters	speaking voice	
Girls, young men, guests, neighbour women	chorus	

== Performance history ==
Bluthochzeit premiered at the Cologne Opera on 8 June 1957 in a production directed by Eric Bormann and conducted by Günter Wand. It was the first world premiere to be staged in the rebuilt opera house.

The performance by Stuttgart Opera in 1964 was filmed live and released on DVD in 2005. The opera was chosen to open the Opernhaus Düsseldorf with a performance on 12 October 1986 by the Deutsche Oper am Rhein, conducted by Hans Wallat and staged by Kurt Horres. Bluthochzeit was revived in January 2013 with a new production at the Wuppertal Opera, directed by Christian von Götz and conducted by Hilary Griffiths. A performance of this production was filmed and released on DVD in 2014.

== Recordings ==
- Bluthochzeit – Gürzenich-Orchester and chorus of Cologne Opera, conducted by Günter Wand (recorded 1 and 6 July 1957 by Westdeutscher Rundfunk, released 2007 as Volume 12 of The Günter Wand Edition). Label: Profil PH05044.
- Bluthochzeit – Orchestra and chorus of Stuttgart State Opera, conducted by Ferdinand Leitner (recorded and filmed live in 1964, released on DVD 2005). Label: Immortal 950017.
- Bluthochzeit – Orchestra and chorus of Wuppertal Opera, directed by Christian von Götz and conducted by Hilary Griffiths (recorded and filmed in 2013, released on DVD 2014). Label: Wergo MV 8075.
