= Die Fastnachtsbeichte (opera) =

1983 opera by Giselher Klebe

- Opera by Giselher Klebe
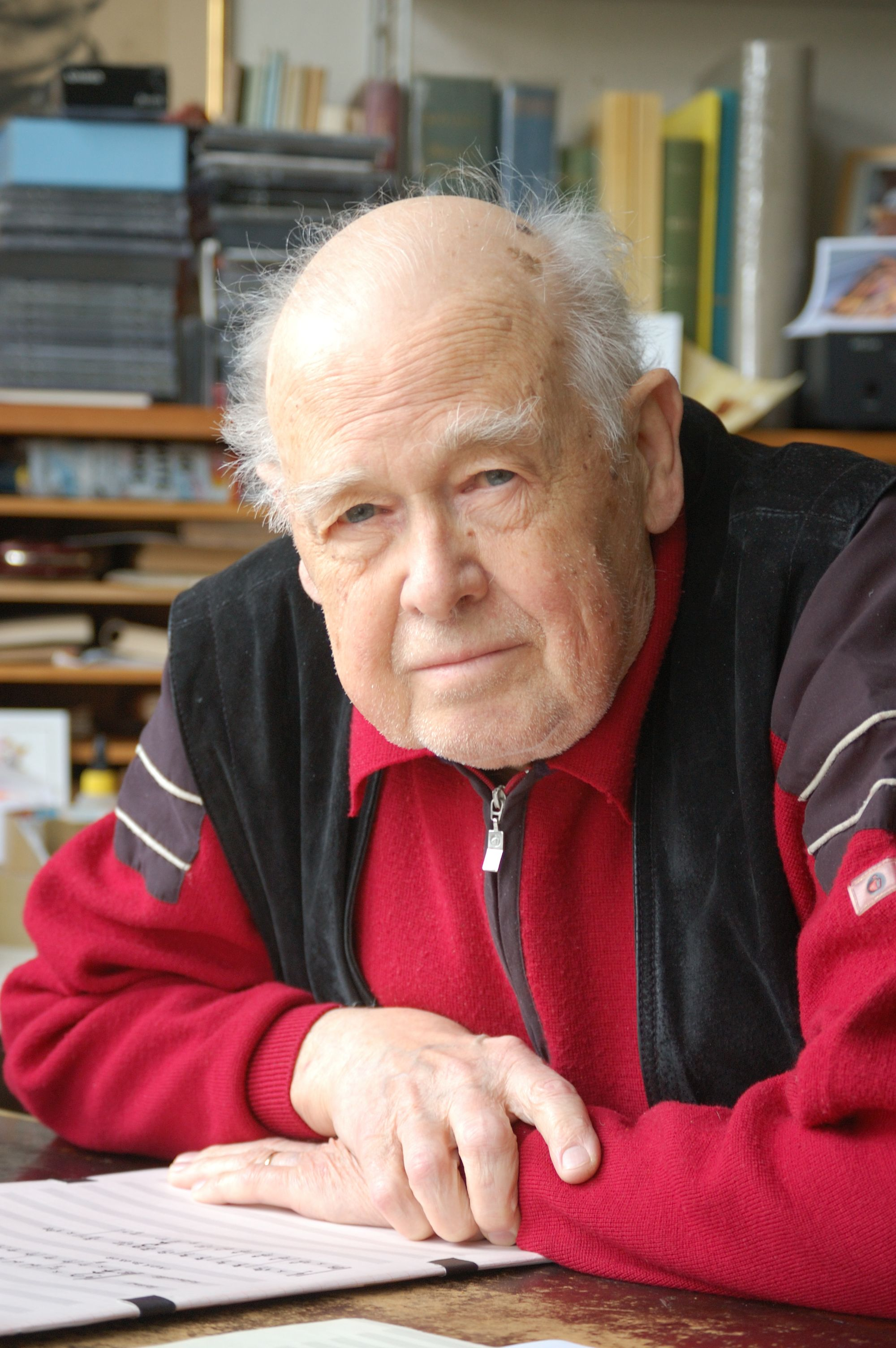
- The composer in 2008
- Translation: Carnival Confession
- Librettist: Lore Klebe
- Language: German
- Based on: Die Fastnachtsbeichte by Carl Zuckmayer
- Premiere: 20 December 1983; Staatstheater Darmstadt

Die Fastnachtsbeichte, Op. 90, (Carnival Confession) is an opera in two acts by Giselher Klebe. His wife, Lore Klebe, wrote the libretto based on Carl Zuckmayer's 1959 novella of the same name, set in 1913 in Mainz.

The opera premiered on 20 December 1983 at the Staatstheater Darmstadt, which had commissioned the work. Kurt Horres directed the production and Hans Drewanz conducted.
