= Andrea Lorenzo Scartazzini =

Swiss composer (born 1971)

- Born: 1971 (age 54–55); Basel, Switzerland
- Occupation: Composer
- Website: www.scartazzini.com

Andrea Lorenzo Scartazzini (born 1971) is a Swiss composer whose operas have been performed at leading European opera houses.

== Career ==
Born in Basel, he studied there German studies and Italian studies. He changed to studying composition with Rudolf Kelterborn at the Musikhochschule Basel, which he continued with Wolfgang Rihm in Karlsruhe. In 1999/2000, he studied one semester at the Royal Academy of Music.

He has worked as a composer, and in the beginning also as a music teacher. His works have been performed at major festivals such as the Salzburg Easter Festival, Lucerne Festival and Darmstädter Ferienkurse. They have been played by ensembles such as Kammerorchester Basel, Collegium Novum Zürich, Ensemble Contrechamps, Ensemble intercontemporain and Ensemble Phoenix. He composed in 2008 Siegel for the Basel Sinfonietta, who premiered it with Claudia Barainsky, conducted by Peter Hirsch. The ensemble premiered in 2012 his Viaggiatori, composed for the centenary of the Basler Bach-Chor.

He was in 2004/05 composer in residence at the Witten/Herdecke University. In 2006, his opera Wut premiered at the Theater Erfurt. A CD with songs was published by the label Guild Music. In 2012, his opera Der Sandmann on a libretto by Thomas Jonigk premiered at the Theater Basel which had commissioned the opera, staged by Christof Loy. The production was shown at the Frankfurt Opera in 2016, as the first in Germany. His opera Edward II. premiered in February 2017 at the Deutsche Oper Berlin, conducted by Thomas Søndergård and staged again by Loy.

Scartazzini received several awards, including the Jacob Burckhardt Prize of the Goethe Foundation Basel (Johann-Wolfgang-von-Goethe-Stiftung), and the study prize (Förderpreis) of the Ernst von Siemens Music Prize in 2000.

== Works (selection) ==
- 2006: Wut, opera
- 2008: Siegel for soprano and orchestra
- 2011: Viaggiatori for soloists, choir and orchestra
- 2016: Der Sandmann, opera
- 2017: Edward II, opera
