= Ulrich Andreas Vogt =

German businessman (born 1952)

Ulrich Andreas Vogt (born 6 August 1952) is a German businessman who was director of the Vogt-Gruppe. He was a tenor at the Opernhaus Dortmund and founding director of the Konzerthaus Dortmund.

Born in Dortmund, Vogt studied at the conservatory piano and violin, planning to become to be a musician. When his father died in 1974, he took over managing the family's service business. He studied business and simultaneously voice with Elisabeth Grümmer. From 1979 he was a tenor at the Opernhaus Dortmund, then under the direction of Hans Wallat.

In 1984, he retired as a singer to concentrate on the business Vogt-Gruppe for Facility management. He promoted the building of the Konzerthaus Dortmund. From 1998, he was director of the Dortmunder Konzerthaus GmbH, building began in 2000, and the house was opened in 2002.
