= Hans Wallat =

German conductor

- Born: October 18, 1929; Berlin, Germany
- Died: 11 December 2014 (aged 85); Hilden, Germany.
- Occupation: Music Director

Hans Wallat (18 October 1929 – 11 December 2014) was a German conductor, GMD in Bremen, at the Nationaltheater Mannheim, Theater Dortmund and Deutsche Oper am Rhein. A specialist for the stage works of Richard Wagner, he appeared at the Bayreuth Festival and internationally.

== Career ==
Born in Berlin, he studied with Rudolf Neuhaus in Schwerin. He worked at theatres in Schwerin, Stendal, the Meiningen Court Theatre and in Cottbus. In 1958, Wallat was appointed Erster Kapellmeister at the Leipzig Opera. He left the GDR shortly before the Wall was built, and was Erster Kapellmeister at the Deutsche Oper Berlin from 1964.

Wallat specialised in German opera, focussed on the works of Richard Wagner. In 1965 he became Generalmusikdirektor (GMD) in Bremen. In 1968, he stepped in for Karl Böhm to conduct performances of Die Meistersinger von Nürnberg and Der fliegende Holländer at the Bayreuth Festival. He was the regular conductor of the Meistersinger in 1970 and of the Holländer in 1971. He was in demand internationally, including the Bolshoi Theatre and the Vienna State Opera. His debut at the Metropolitan Opera was on 7 October 1971 Beethoven's Fidelio, with Ingrid Bjoner, James McCracken, William Dooley, Giorgio Tozzi and Judith Blegen in leading roles. Wallat conducted more than 90 Ring Cycles and was regarded as one of the work's most knowledgeable conductors.

Wallat was GMD at Nationaltheater Mannheim from 1970 to 1980. In 1980, he conducted Wagner's Tannhäuser at the Cologne Opera, with Jean Cox in the title role and Hannelore Bode as Elisabeth. He was GMD at the Theater Dortmund from 1980 to 1985. From 1986 to 1996 he was GMD at the Deutsche Oper am Rhein. He chose a contemporary opera, Wolfgang Fortner's Bluthochzeit, staged by Kurt Horres, for his debut at the Opernhaus Düsseldorf on 12 October 1986. In 1996 Wallat was named Honorary Conductor of the Düsseldorfer Symphoniker.

Wallat conducted Wagner's Tristan und Isolde, Siegfried and Parsifal at the Richard Wagner Festival Wels. In honour of his 75th birthday, the Konzerthaus Dortmund produced in 2003 and 2004 the Wallat-Ring, a half-scenic performance of the Ring Cycle with international soloists, staged by Ulrich Andreas Vogt and played by the Dortmunder Philharmoniker. He was supposed to receive the German Order of Merit after a performance of Götterdämmerung on 17 October 2004, planned to be conducted by him. Wolfgang Wagner and other celebrities who had worked with him were present, but he was too ill to attend. The performance was conducted by Ralf Weikert, with Gabriele Schnaut as Brünnhilde, Stig Andersen as Siegfried, and Waltraud Meier as Waltraute.

Wallat died in Hilden in December 2014 at the age of 85.

== Awards ==
In 2004, Wallat received the German Cross of the Order of Merit. In 2009, he became an honorary member of the Deutsche Oper am Rhein. In 2010 he was awarded the Duisburger Musikpreis (Duisburg music prize).
