= Tools for Action =

Art collective

Tools for Action was an informal art collective working on the intersection of art and activism. As of 2019 it is formalized as Stichting Tools for Action Foundation. It acts as collaboration platform between artists, educators, activists and others interested in making and interventions with inflatable sculptures. Tools for Action aims to practice alternative forms of social engagement and resistance and open the way for experimentation.

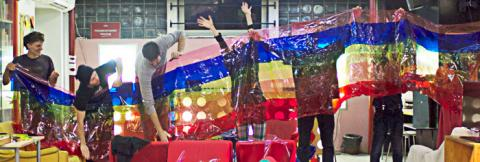
Tools for Actions and QueerSport as Team-PopUpRainbow in inflatable workshop, in MaMa club, 2014

== History ==
Tools for Action was in 2012 by the Dutch-Hungarian artist Artúr van Balen working in Berlin, Germany, first operating as Eclectic Electric Collective with Jakub Simcik, by making inflatable objects within a protest context. Joint projects with Jakub Simcik were The Hammer (Berlin-Mexico 2010); publication El Martillo (2011). During the years several collaborators and members of collective took part in different actions as well as educational and artistic activities.

== Awards ==
Award for Cultural Education of the Federal Ministry of Culture and the Media of Germany for 2017 for the project Mirror Barricade together with Schauspiel Dortmund.

== Exhibitions and presentations ==
- 2014 Disobedient Objects, Victoria and Albert Museum, London
- 2016 Barrikade, IG Metall / Haus am L√ºtzowplatz, Berlin
- 2017 Tools for Action, Wiener Festwochen, Vienna
- 2018 Floating Utopias, neue Gesellschaft für bildende Kunst, Berlin
