= Das Mädchen aus Domrémy =

1976 opera by Giselher Klebe

- Opera by Giselher Klebe
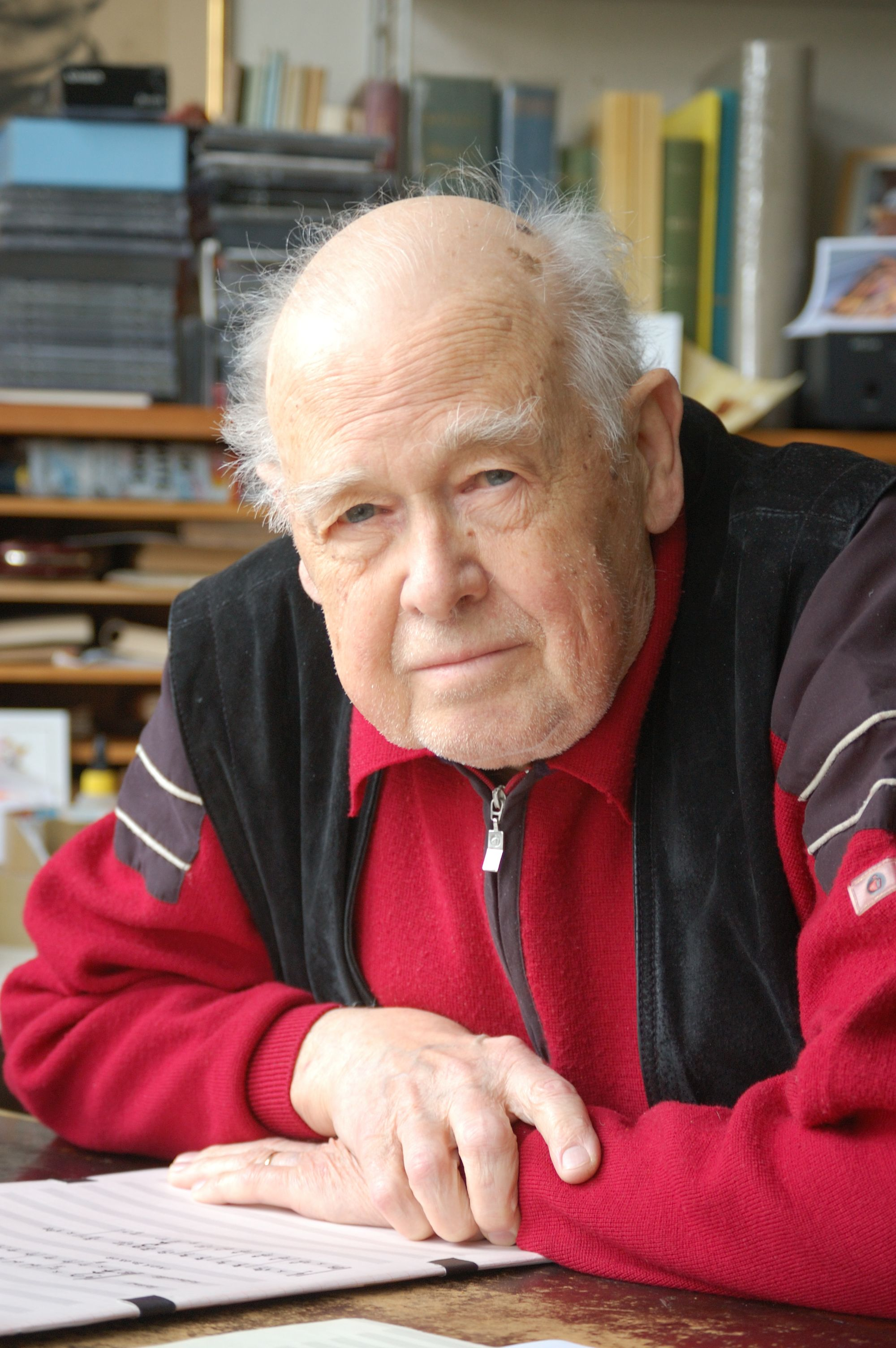
- The composer in 2008
- Translation: The Maid from Domrémy
- Librettist: Lore Klebe and Giselher Klebe
- Language: German
- Based on: Die Jungfrau von Orléans by Schiller
- Premiere: 19 June 1976; Staatsoper Stuttgart

Das Mädchen aus Domrémy, Op. 72, (The Maid from Domrémy) is an opera in two acts by Giselher Klebe who with his wife, Lore Klebe, also wrote the libretto based on the play Die Jungfrau von Orléans by Friedrich Schiller.

The opera premiered on 19 June 1976 at the Staatsoper Stuttgart. It was conducted by János Kulka, directed by Kurt Horres, and featured Irmgard Stadler (soprano), Enriqueta Attres, Günther Reich (baritone), Raymond Wolansky (baritone), and Toni Krämer (tenor). The music uses twelve-tone and tonal elements and taped sounds. A revised version for a smaller orchestra was premiered on 2 November 1980 at the Oldenburgisches Staatstheater.

== Roles ==
Roles, voice types
Role	Voice type
Johanna	soprano
Lionel, an English field marshal	tenor
Charles VII	tenor
Pierre Cauchon, Bishop of Beauvais	tenor
Prince Dunois, Bastard of Orléans	baritone
Brother Martin Ladvenu	baritone
Agnès Sorel, Charles' mistress	soprano
