= Christof Loy =

German opera director (born 1962)

- Born: 5 December 1962 (age 63); Essen, Germany
- Education: Folkwangschule
- Occupation: Opera director
- Awards: Director of the Year; Der Faust; International Opera Awards
- Website: www.christof-loy.de

Christof Loy (born 5 December 1962) is a German stage director especially for opera, whose work received several awards. A freelance director, he has staged operas from Baroque to premieres of new works at major European opera houses and festivals. He is known for directing works by Mozart.

== Career ==
Born in Essen, the son of architect Horst Loy and a translator, Loy began studies of opera directing at the Folkwangschule with Dieter Bülter-Marell at the age of 14. He received the Folkwang-Preis award for his first staged work, Pimpinone. He studied in Essen until 1982 and continued his studies at LMU Munich, including science of the theatre, art history, and Italian studies. In 1984, Loy began work as an assistant at the Musiktheater im Revier, where he collaborated with Dietrich Hilsdorf and Jaroslav Chundela, among others. In 1986, he moved to the Staatstheater Wiesbaden, and since 1990 he has worked as a freelance director.

He made his debut at the Royal Opera House in 2002 with Ariadne auf Naxos, conducted by Antonio Pappano who was then the new music director. He also staged there Donizetti's Lucia di Lammermoor, Alban Berg's Lulu and Wagner's Tristan und Isolde. He directed Mussorgski's Khovanshchina at the Dutch National Opera, Handel's Alcina and Bellini's I Capuleti e i Montecchi at the Opernhaus Zürich, Verdi's Macbeth at the Grand Théâtre de Genève, Britten's Peter Grimes at the Theater an der Wien, Janáček's Jenůfa at the Deutsche Oper Berlin, Der Rosenkavalier by Richard Strauss at the Royal Swedish Opera, Mozart's Così fan tutte and Don Giovanni, and Arabella by Richard Strauss at the Oper Frankfurt, his Daphne at the Theater Basel, and Handel's Theodora for the Salzburg Festival. In 2017, he directed the premiere of Andrea Lorenzo Scartazzini's Edward II. at the Deutsche Oper Berlin.

Among other awards, his staging of Mozart's Così fan tutte at the Oper Frankfurt earned him the prize Der Faust in the category direction in music theatre (Regie Musiktheater) in 2008.

== Opera productions ==
- Claudio Monteverdi
  - L'Orfeo (2001 Düsseldorf)
  - Il ritorno d'Ulisse in patria (2003 Düsseldorf)
  - L'incoronazione di Poppea (2004 Deutsche Oper am Rhein)
- G. F. Handel
  - Alcina (2002 Hamburg, 2014 Opernhaus Zürich)
  - Saul (2003 Bavarian State Opera)
  - Giulio Cesare (Theater an der Wien)
  - Theodora (Salzburg Festival).
- Christoph Willibald Gluck
  - Iphigénie en Aulide (Glyndebourne Festival)
- Joseph Haydn
  - Armida (2007 Salzburg Festival)
- W. A. Mozart
  - La finta semplice (2006 Oper Frankfurt)
  - La finta giardiniera (1998 Düsseldorf)
  - Lucio Silla (Düsseldorf, Copenhagen Opera)
  - Die Entführung aus dem Serail (1992 Freiburg, 1999 Brussels, 2003 Frankfurt)
  - Le nozze di Figaro (1998 Brussels)
  - Don Giovanni (1999 Graz Opera, 2014 Frankfurt)
  - Così fan tutte (2008 Frankfurt)
  - Die Zauberflöte (1990 Stuttgart, 2004 Düsseldorf)
  - La clemenza di Tito (2006 Frankfurt)
- Vincenzo Bellini
  - I Capuleti e i Montecchi (Opernhaus Zürich)
  - La straniera (Opernhaus Zürich)
- Gioachino Rossini
  - Il turco in Italia (2005 Hamburg)
  - L'italiana in Algeri (2001 Düsseldorf)
  - La donna del lago (2010 Grand Théâtre de Genève)
- Gaetano Donizetti
  - Lucia di Lammermoor (1999 Düsseldorf, Royal Opera House)
  - Roberto Devereux (2004 Munich)
  - Lucrezia Borgia (2010 Munich)
- Hector Berlioz
  - La damnation de Faust (2000 Bremen)
  - Les Troyens (2005 Düsseldorf)
- Richard Wagner
  - Tannhäuser (1995 Musiktheater im Revier, Gelsenkirchen), 2019 Dutch National Opera)
  - Tristan und Isolde (Royal Opera House)
  - Parsifal (Royal Swedish Opera)
- Engelbert Humperdinck
  - Königskinder (2022 Dutch National Opera)
- Giuseppe Verdi
  - Macbeth (Grand Théâtre de Genève)
  - Les vêpres siciliennes (Dutch National Opera)
  - Don Carlos (2000 Duisburg)
  - Falstaff (Deutsche Oper Berlin)
- Jacques Offenbach
  - La belle Hélène (2005 Düsseldorf)
  - Les contes d'Hoffmann (2004 Düsseldorf)
- Charles Gounod
  - Faust (2005 Frankfurt)
- Peter Tchaikovky
  - Eugen Onegin (Düsseldorf, 2001 La Monnaie)
- Modest Mussorgski
  - Khovanshchina (Dutch National Opera)
- Jules Massenet
  - Werther (1996 Bremen)
  - Manon (1997 Düsseldorf)
- Giacomo Puccini
  - La bohème (2002 Brussels)
  - La fanciulla del West (Royal Swedish Opera)
- Pietro Mascagni / Ruggero Leoncavallo
  - Cavalleria rusticana und Pagliacci (2003 Düsseldorf)
- Leoš Janáček
  - Její pastorkyňa (Jenůfa) (2012 Deutsche Oper Berlin)
- Richard Strauss
  - Der Rosenkavalier (2001 Brussels, Royal Swedish Opera)
  - Ariadne auf Naxos (2002 Royal Opera House)
  - Arabella (Dutch National Opera)
  - Die Frau ohne Schatten (2011 Salzburg Festival)
  - Intermezzo (2009 Theater an der Wien)
  - Daphne (Theater Basel(
- Franz Lehár
  - Die lustige Witwe (1992 Ulm)
- Benjamin Britten
  - Peter Grimes (2015 Theater an der Wien, International Opera Awards 2016)
- Alban Berg
  - Lulu (Royal Opera House)
- Hans Werner Henze
  - Der Prinz von Homburg (2009 Theater an der Wien)
  - Die Bassariden (Munich)
- Andrea Lorenzo Scartazzini (born 1971)
  - Der Sandmann (2012 Theater Basel)
  - Edward II. (2017 Deutsche Oper Berlin)

== Awards ==
- 1982: Folkwang-Preis
- 2001: Duisburger Musikpreis
- 2003: Nomination Laurence Olivier Award
- 2003: Director of the Year (Regisseur des Jahres) by Opernwelt
- 2004: Director of the Year
- 2008: Director of the Year
- 2008: Der Faust for Così fan tutte at the Oper Frankfurt
- 2010: Laurence Olivier Award for Tristan und Isolde at the Royal Opera House
- 2017: International Opera Awards as best opera director
- 2021: Österreichischer Musiktheaterpreis, best direction for Così fan tutte at the Salzburg Festival
- 2024: International Opera Awards as best opera director
