= In seinem Garten liebt Don Perlimplin Belisa =

- Opera by Wolfgang Fortner
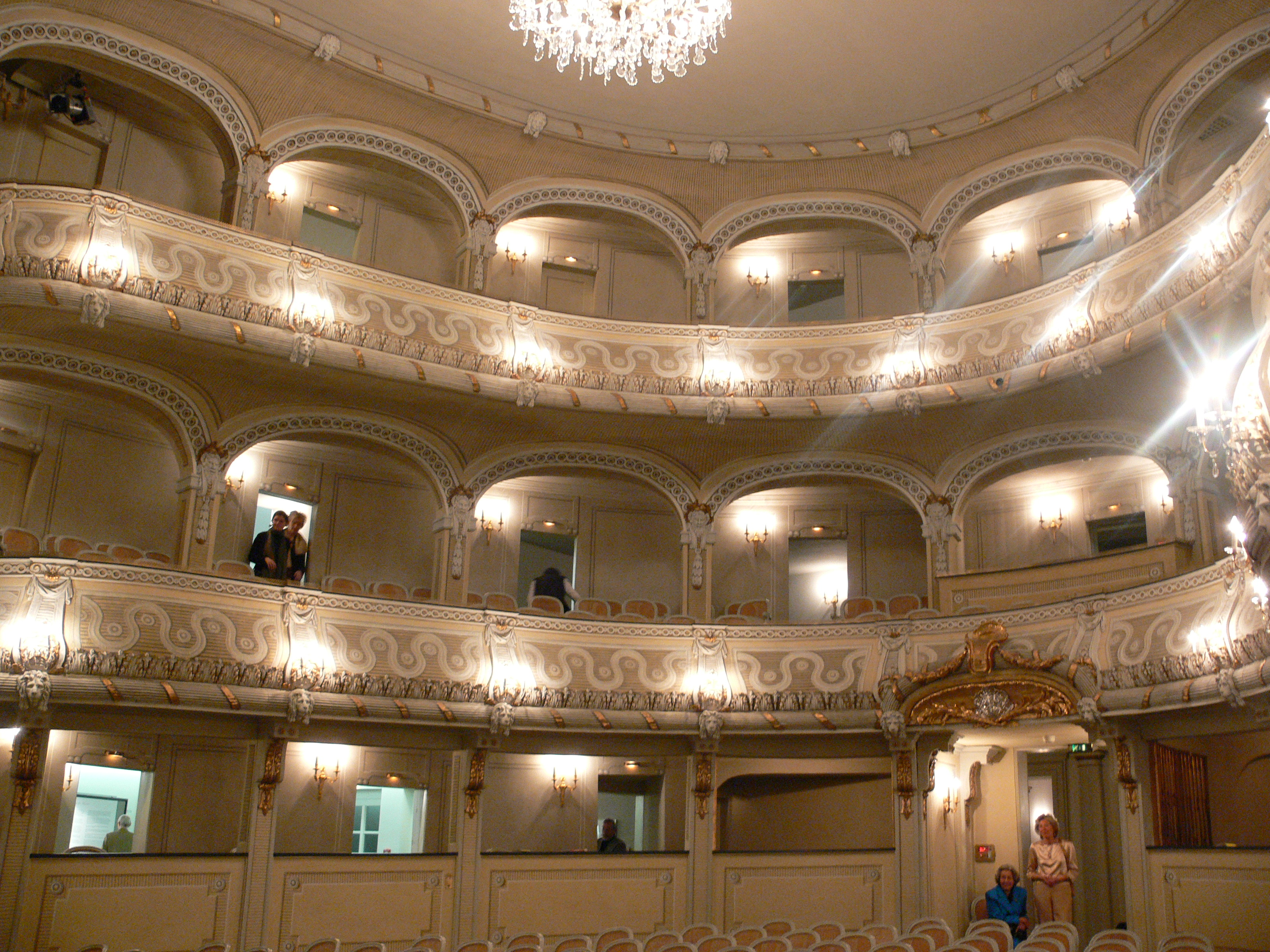
- Schlosstheater Schwetzingen, for which the opera was commissioned
- Translation: The Love of Don Perlimplín and Belisa in the Garden
- Librettist: Fortner
- Language: German
- Based on: García Lorca's Amor de don Perlimplín con Belisa en su jardín
- Premiere: 10 May 1962; Schwetzingen Festival, by the Cologne Opera

In seinem Garten liebt Don Perlimplin Belisa (In his garden Don Perlimplín loves Belisa) is an opera in two acts by Wolfgang Fortner. The libretto, also by Fortner, is based on Federico García Lorca's play Amor de don Perlimplín con Belisa en su jardín. It premiered at the opening of the 1962 Schwetzingen Festival.

== History ==
Wolfgang Fortner composed the opera on a commission of the broadcaster Süddeutscher Rundfunk (SR) for the opening of the 1962 Schwetzingen Festival. The festival has a tradition of opening with a new work, such as Werner Egk's Der Revisor in 1957, Gerhard Wimberger's La Battaglia in 1960, and Hans Werner Henze's Elegie für junge Liebende in 1961. The composer chose again a play by Federico García Lorca, as he had done already in Bluthochzeit. The opera's subtitle alludes to the play's subtitle, "Aleluya erotica en un prologo y tres escenas" ("An erotic lace-paper valentine in a prologue and three scenes"). It is in German "Vier Bilder eines erotischen Bilderbogens in der Art eines Kammerspiels von Federico García Lorca" (Four images of an erotic valentine in the way of a chamber play by F. G. Lorca), characterizing it as a chamber opera.

In seinem Garten liebt Don Perlimplin Belisa premiered at the Schlosstheater Schwetzingen on 10 May 1962 in a production of the Cologne Opera, staged by Oscar Fritz Schuh and with Wolfgang Sawallisch conducting choir and orchestra of the SR.

== Roles ==
Role	Voice type	Premiere cast Conductor: Wolfgang Sawallisch
Belisa	soprano	Lia Montoya
The Mother	coloratura soprano	Maria Kallitsi
Perlimplin	baritone	Ernst Gutstein

== Music ==
Lorca had described his text as ever-changing between lyric and grotesque elements, and as fragmentary. Fortner focused on the serious aspects of a drama of the soul (Seelendrama), following the interpretation of the translator of the play, Enrique Beck. The sound is coloured by invisible choirs a cappella, celesta, vibraphone, harp, harpsichord, guitar and percussion.
