= Elisabeth Schwarzenberg =

German operatic soprano

Elisabeth Schwarzenberg, later married name Schnapka (23 September 1933 – 2004) was an Austrian operatic soprano.

== Life and career ==
Born in Vienna, Schwarzenberg After her vocal training, she made her debut in 1956 at the Deutsche Oper am Rhein in Düsseldorf and Duisburg, where she was part of the ensemble until 1966. There, she was able to build up a broad repertoire, ranging from Mozart, one of her main focuses, to the present. For example, she sang Donna Elvira in Don Giovanni and Elisabeth in Tannhäuser. In Düsseldorf in 1958, she took part in the world premiere of the new version of Ernst Krenek's stage work with music Karl V.. In 1961, she took over Anna in the world premiere of Rudolf Wagner-Régeny's Mine at Falun at the Salzburg Festival. From 1962 to 1973, she was a regular at the Bayreuth Festival. There she sang Wellgunde in Das Rheingold and in Götterdämmerung, Gerhilde and Ortlinde in Die Walküre and the First Squire and a Flower Girl of the Second Division in Parsifal. In 1966, she was engaged at the Volksoper Wien, and in 1967 she made a guest appearance at the Teatro Nacional de São Carlos of Lisbon. Between September 1969 and June 1972, she appeared in a number of performances at the Vienna State Opera - as the First Lady in The Magic Flute and as Freia, Wellgunde, Gerhilde, Gutrune and the Third Norn in The Ring of the Nibelung. Her signature role is the Marschallin in Der Rosenkavalier by Hugo von Hofmannsthal and Richard Strauss. In later years she worked as a singing teacher and gave master classes.

She was married to the bass Georg Schnapka (1932-2005), who also worked at the Volksoper.

== Recordings ==
A record "Elisabeth Schwarzenberg sings songs by Franz Schubert and Johannes Brahms", released by Preiser Records, dates from 1980. The singer was accompanied on the piano by Jeannie Reddin. Schubert's works include Seligkeit (D 433) and Die Forelle (D 550), Brahms' Meine Liebe ist grün, Op. 63 No. 5, based on the poem by Felix Schumann.

There are recordings of Krenek's Karl V. (Düsseldorf 1958) and Wagner's Parsifal (Bayreuth 1970). She can also be heard in some rarities - in recordings of the operettas Leichte Kavallerie and Das Pensionat by Franz von Suppè, both conducted by Max Schönherr, and in a complete recording of Richard Strauss' Daphne with the ensemble of the Deutsche Oper am Rhein.
