= Chlestakows Wiederkehr =

Opera by Giselher Klebe

- Opera by Giselher Klebe
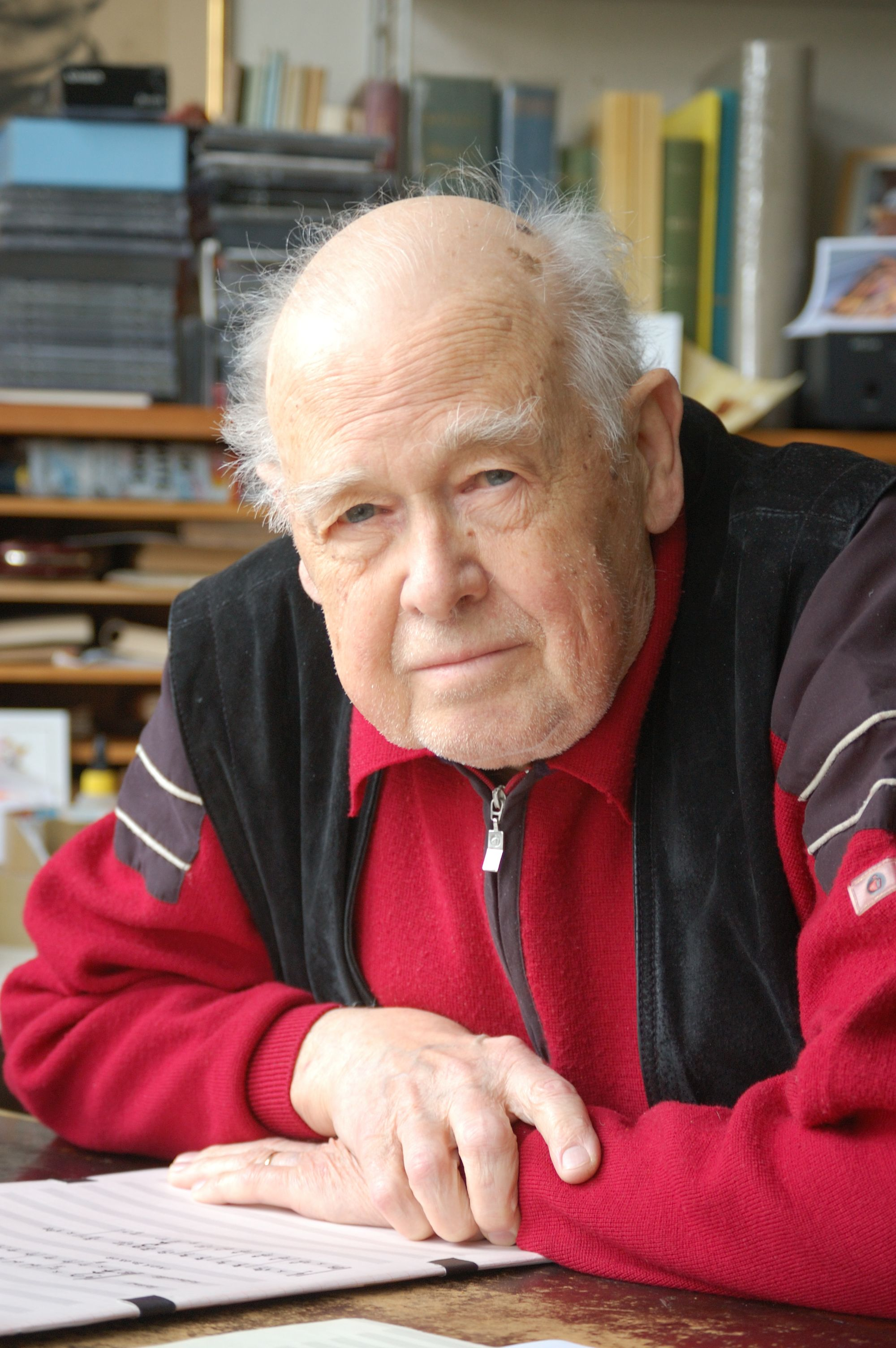
- The composer in 2008
- Translation: Khlestakov's Return
- Librettist: Klebe
- Language: German
- Based on: The Government Inspector by Gogol
- Premiere: 11 April 2008; Landestheater Detmold

Chlestakows Wiederkehr, op. 149, (Khlestakov's Return) is an opera in three acts by Giselher Klebe. He also wrote the libretto, based on the play Der Revisor (The Government Inspector) by Nikolai Gogol. The work lasts about 70 minutes.

The opera premiered on 11 April 2008 at the Landestheater Detmold, Germany. It is Klebe's only comedic opera. His adaptation of the text is only loosely based on Gogol and adds a significant twist in the final scene.

Role	Voice type	Premiere cast, 11 April 2008 Conductor: Erich Wächter
Anton Antonowitsch Swosnik, Town Governor	baritone	Andreas Jören
Ammos Fjordorowitsch Ljapkin, Judge	tenor	Byoung Oh Kim
Luka Lukitsch, School Inspector	baritone	Joachim Goltz
Artemij Filipowitsch Semljnanika, Superintendent for the Homeless and the Old	bass	Vladimir Miakotine
Iwan Kusmitsch Schpekin, Post Master	tenor	Snorri Wium
Natascha Andrejewna, Town Governor's wife	mezzo-soprano	Brigitte Bauma
Olga Antonowna, Town Governor's daughter)	soprano	Kirsten Höner zu Siederdissen
Iwan Alexandrowitsch Chlestakow, a young man from Petersburg	tenor	Johannes Harten
Ossip, Chlestakow's servant	tenor	Markus Gruber
Mischka, the Town Governor's servant		Kevin Dickmann
Stephan Iwanowitsch Koropkin, Innkeeper		
Policeman	spoken role	
Director		Kay Metzger
Stage & Costume Design		Petra Mollérus
Dramaturgy		Elisabeth Wirtz

The role names above are spelled as in the German text.
