= Das Rendezvous =

Opera in one act by Giselher Klebe

- Opera by Giselher Klebe
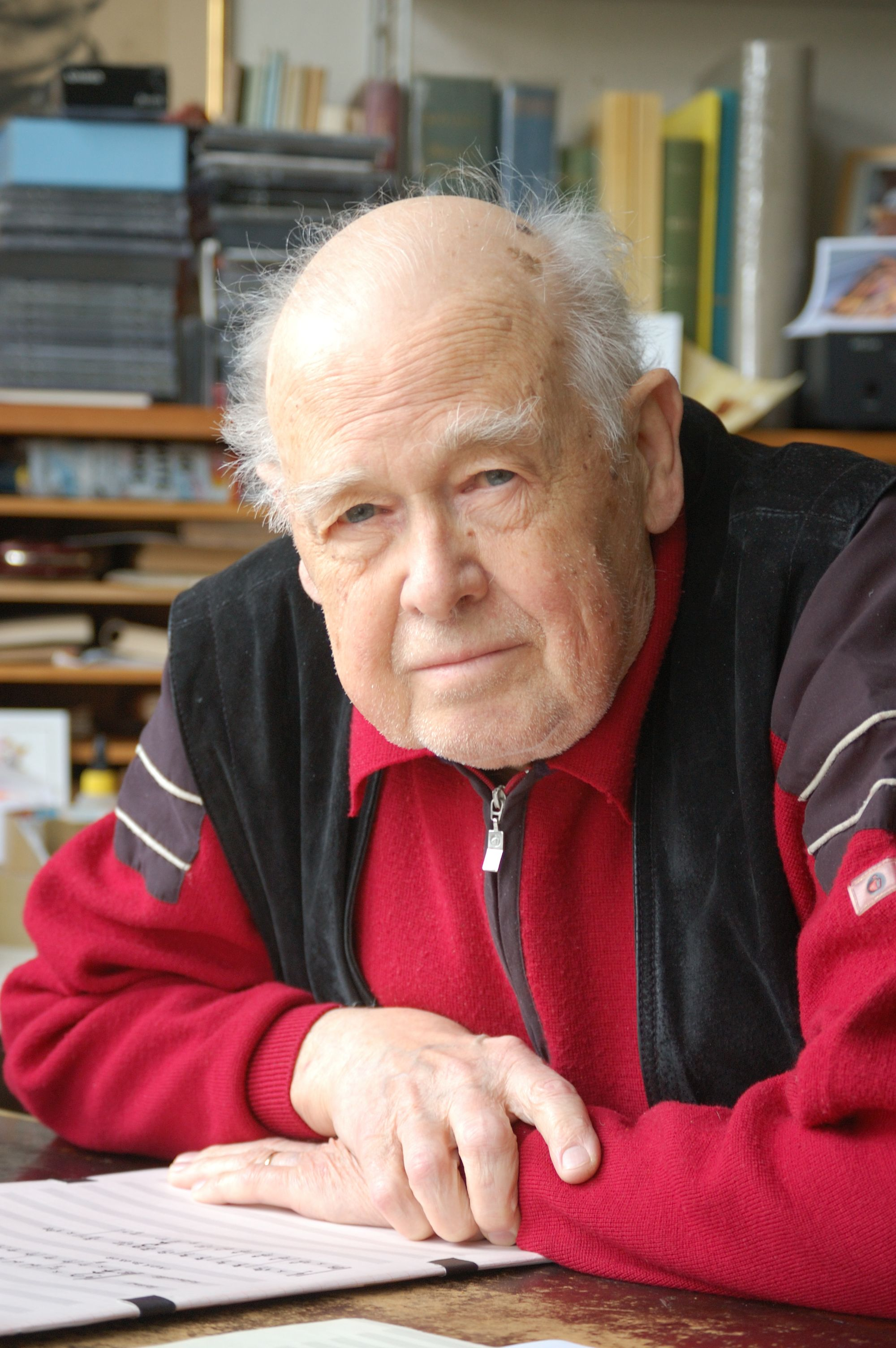
- The composer in 2008
- Librettist: Lore Klebe
- Language: German
- Based on: Ein spaßiges Abenteuer by Mikhail Zoshchenko
- Premiere: October 1977; Staatsoper Hannover

Das Rendezvous, Op. 78, is a chamber opera in one act by Giselher Klebe, to a libretto by his wife Lore Klebe, based on a satire by Mikhail Zoshchenko. The opera was premiered in 1977, for the 125th anniversary of the Staatsoper Hannover.

== History ==
Klebe composed the opera for the 125th anniversary of the opera house of the Staatsoper Hannover in 1977, which was celebrated with three commissions of new works, also Wolfgang Rihm's Faust und Yorick and Karlheinz Stockhausen's Jubiläum for large orchestra. Klebe's wife, Lore Klebe, wrote the libretto based on the satiric story Ein spaßiges Abenteuer (A funny adventure) by Mikhail Zoshchenko. It was Klebe's first comic opera.

The opera was premiered at the opera house in October 1977, staged by Günter Roth and conducted by Hans Herbert Jöris. A reviewer of Die Zeit described it as a burlesque about the possibility, forms and consequences of a liberation of the norms of marriage ("eine Burleske über die Möglichkeit, die Formen und die Folgen einer Liberalisierung strenger Ehe-Normen"). Meetings between three men and three women are treated with irony. Klebe's music has been described as a chamber opera with dramatic drive and economically used sound effects, rhythms and accents.
