= Giselher Klebe =

German composer

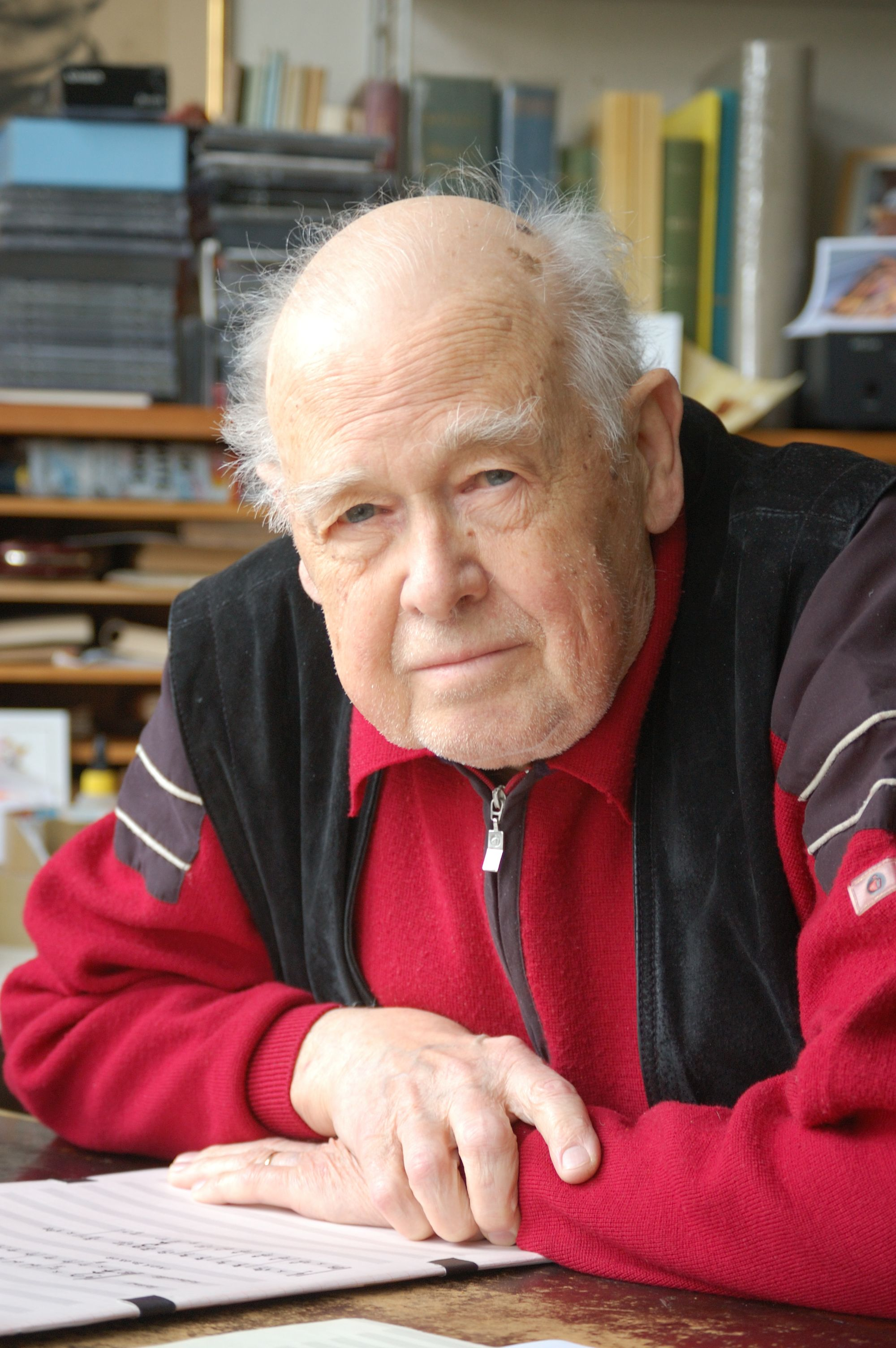
- The composer at his desk in April 2008
- Born: 28 June 1925; Mannheim, Germany
- Died: 5 October 2009 (aged 84); Detmold, Germany
- Occupations: Composer; Academic teacher
- Organization: Hochschule für Musik Detmold
- Spouse: Lore Klebe
- Awards: Academy of Arts

Giselher Wolfgang Klebe (28 June 1925 – 5 October 2009) was a German composer, and an academic teacher. He composed more than 140 works, among them 14 operas, all based on literary works, eight symphonies, 15 solo concerts, chamber music, piano works, and sacred music.

== Biography ==
Giselher Klebe was born in Mannheim, Germany. He received musical tuition early in his life from his mother, the violinist Gertrud Klebe. The family relocated in 1932 to Munich, where his mother's sister, Melanie Michaelis, continued the training. His father's profession required a further relocation in 1936 to Rostock.

Following the separation of his parents, Klebe moved with his mother and sister to Berlin. During 1938, the 13-year-old sketched his first compositions. In 1940, he began studies in violin, viola, and composition, supported by a grant from the city of Berlin.

After serving his term in the Reich Labour Service, Klebe was conscripted to military service as signalman. After the German surrender, he was taken prisoner of war by the Russian forces. Due to ill health, he was soon released.

Having convalesced, Klebe continued his music studies in Berlin (1946–1951), first under Josef Rufer, then in master classes by Boris Blacher. He worked for the radio station Berliner Rundfunk until 1948, when he began to work full-time as a composer.

Klebe was inspired and influenced by works of authors and artists, especially his contemporaries. In 1951 he composed Die Zwitschermaschine Op. 7, (The Twittering Machine), based on the painting by Paul Klee. His first opera, based on Friedrich Schiller's play Die Räuber (The Robbers), was produced in 1957. He composed two operas based on plays by Ödön von Horváth.

In 1957, Klebe succeeded Wolfgang Fortner as docent for the subjects of Composition and Music Theory at the Hochschule für Musik Detmold. He was appointed professor in 1962 and, over the years, taught many students who went on to become well-known composers: Theo Brandmüller, Peter Michael Braun, Hans Martin Corrinth, Matthias Pintscher, and Lars Woldt.

== Honors and legacy ==
- In 1964 Klebe was appointed member of the West Berlin Akademie der Künste (Arts Academy).
- In 1965 he received the Westfälischer Musikpreis (later named the Hans-Werner-Henze-Preis).
- In 2002, the city of Detmold, where he lived, made him an honorary citizen.

== Marriage and family ==
On 10 September 1946 Klebe married the violinist Lore Schiller. They had two daughters, Sonja Katharina and Annette Marianne. Lore Klebe wrote the librettos for some of his operas, including Der Jüngste Tag (Doomsday).

Klebe died on 5 October 2009 in Detmold at the age of 84 after a long illness.

== Works ==
Opus	Title	Translation	Category
4	Piano sonata		Piano sonata
7	Die Zwitschermaschine		Orchestral
13	Wiegenlieder für Christinchen		Piano
22	Elegia appassionata		Piano trio
25	Die Räuber	The Robbers	Opera
26	4 Inventions		Piano
27	Die tödlichen Wünsche	The Deadly Wishes	Opera
29	Cello Concerto No. 1 (1958)		Cello concerto, dedicated to and premiered by Arthur Troester
32	Die Ermordung Cäsars	The Murder of Caesar	Opera
36	Alkmene		Opera
37	Adagio and Fugue with a motif from Wagner's Die Walküre		Orchestral
39	9 Duettini per pianoforte e flauto		Duo
40	Figaro läßt sich scheiden	Figaro Gets Divorced	Opera
49	Jacobowsky und der Oberst	Jacobovsky and the Colonel	Opera
50	Concerto a cinque		Concerto
53	Symphony No. 3 (1966)		Symphony
55	Das Märchen von der schönen Lilie	The Fairy Tale of the Fair Lily	Opera
61	Das Testament		Orchestral
69	Ein wahrer Held	A True Hero	Opera
70	Nenia		Chamber music
72	Das Mädchen aus Domrémy	The Girl from Domrémy	Opera
73	Orpheus		Orchestral
75	Symphony No. 5 (1976–77)		Symphony
76	9 Piano pieces for Sonja		Piano
78	Das Rendezvous		Opera
82	Der Jüngste Tag	Doomsday	Opera
87	String Quartet No. 3		String quartet
90	Die Fastnachtsbeichte	Carnival Confession	Opera
91	Feuersturz		Piano
103	Glockentürme		Piano
107	Agitato		Trombone Quartet
111	Nachklang		Piano
119	Gervaise Macquart		Opera
120	Symphony No. 6 (1996)		Symphony
133	Mignon (2000)		Violin concerto
134	Chara (2002)		Duo
149	Chlestakows Wiederkehr (2008)	Khlestakov's Return	Opera
