= Ein wahrer Held =

1975 opera by Giselher Klebe

- Opera by Giselher Klebe
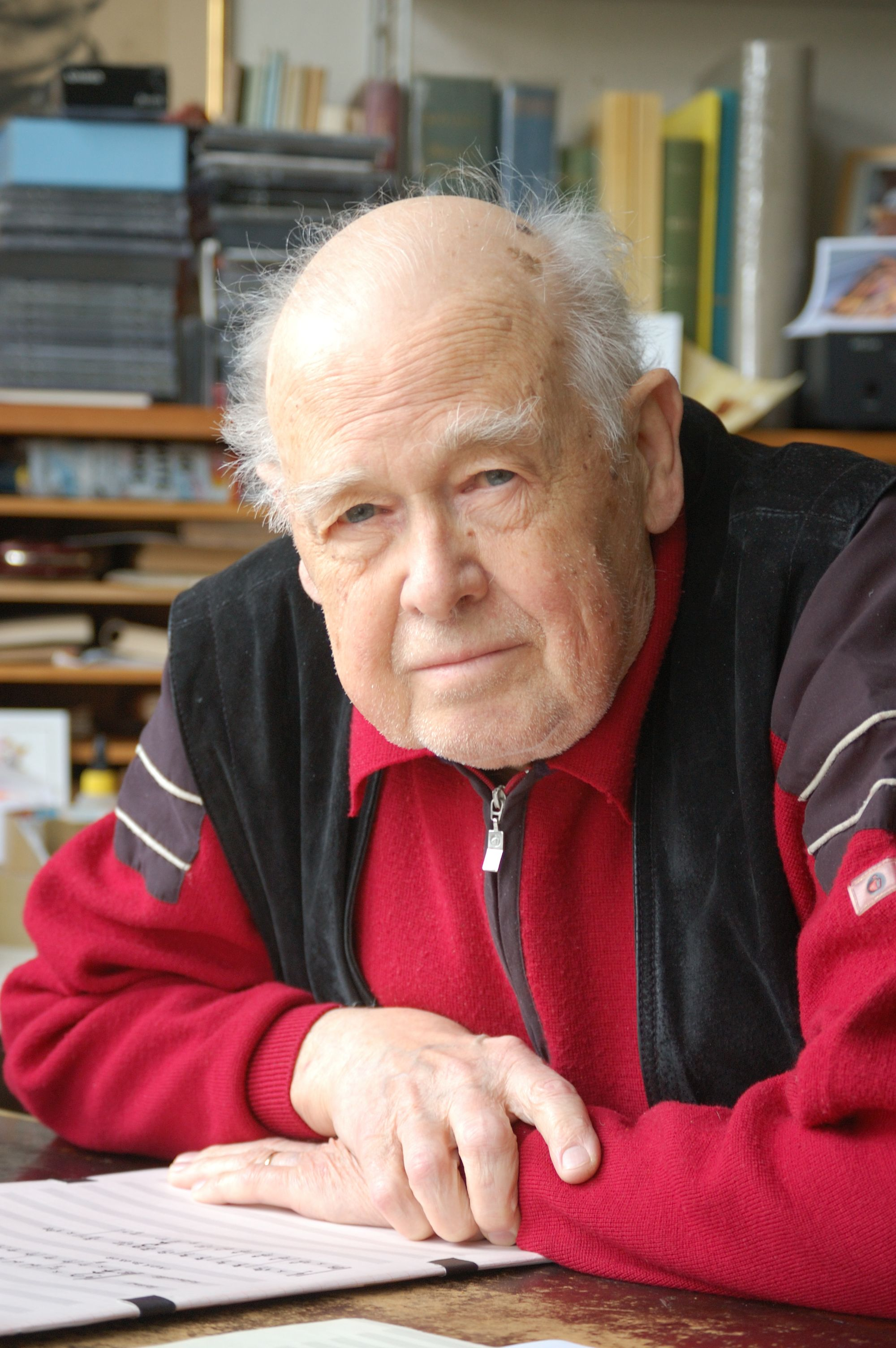
- The composer in 2008
- Translation: A True Hero
- Librettist: Lore Klebe and Giselher Klebe
- Language: German
- Based on: The Playboy of the Western World by John Millington Synge
- Premiere: 18 January 1975; Zurich Opera House

Ein wahrer Held (A True Hero), Op. 69, is an opera in three acts by Giselher Klebe who with his wife, Lore Klebe, also wrote the libretto based on the 1907 play The Playboy of the Western World by John Millington Synge.

The opera premiered during the Zurich June Festival on 18 January 1975 at the Zurich Opera House, conducted by Ferdinand Leitner and directed by Imo Moszkowicz.

== Roles ==
Roles, voice types
Role	Voice type
Christopher Mahone, called Christy	tenor
The old Mahone, his father	baritone
Michael Jame Flaherty, an innkeeper	baritone
Margaret, called Pegeen Mike, his daughter	soprano
Shawn Keogh, Pegeen's cousin	tenor
Widow Quin	soprano
Philly Cullen and Jimmy Farell	bass
Sora Tansey, Susan Brady, Honor Blake, Nelly, village girls	3 sopranos, contralto
Town crier	spoken role
Farmers and their wives
