= Theater Dortmund =

Theatre and opera company in Dortmund, Germany

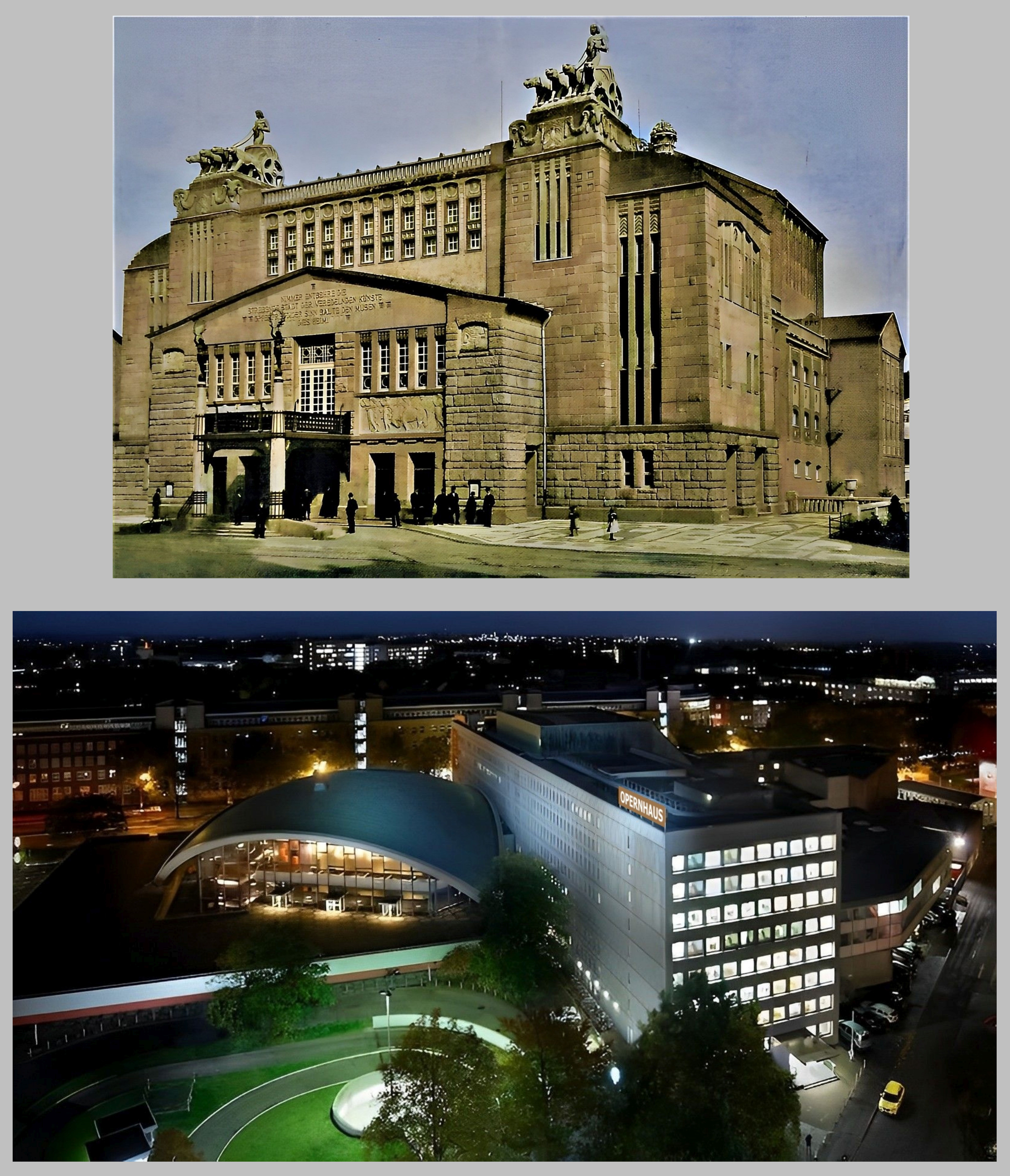
- Theater 1904, destroyed in World War II, and now (Opera House)
- Formation: 1904 as Stadttheater Dortmund
- Type: municipal theatrical organization
- Location: Dortmund
- Coordinates: 51°30′40″N 7°27′42″E
- Website: www.theaterdo.de

Theater Dortmund is a theatrical organization that produces operas, musicals, ballets, plays, and concerts in Dortmund, Germany. It was founded as the Stadttheater Dortmund in 1904. Supported by the German Government, the organization owns and operates several performance spaces.

In 2010, the Ruhr district was a European Capital of Culture, Theater Dortmund is a partner of the related program RUHR.2010 in the fields Music and Theater and Dance.

== Stadttheater Dortmund ==
Theater Dortmund's original theatre was designed by architect Martin Dülfer and built from 1902 to 1904. The theater's inaugural performance was of Richard Wagner's Tannhäuser on 17 December 1904. Busoni's Doktor Faust was performed in 1925.

The building was significantly damaged from an aerial bombing on 1 March 1943, but remained in operation until 1 September 1944 when the Ministry of Public Enlightenment and Propaganda of the Nazi government closed all German theatres. A second bombing on 6 October 1944 completely destroyed the original building.

== Städtische Bühnen Dortmund ==
An interim theatre was inaugurated by Theater Dortmund on 12 September 1950, with a performance of Beethoven's Fidelio. The Intendant was P. Walter Jacob, who pursued performances of Wagner's operas and more recent works. He staged and conducted Wagner's Lohengrin during his first season and conducted Die Meistersinger von Nürnberg the following year. He staged Hans Pfitzner's opera Das Herz (1930) and the drama Eli of Nelly Sachs (1950). In 1954 the musical comedy Die stumme Serenade of Erich Wolfgang Korngold was premiered. In 1955 Jacob staged Franz Werfel's drama Jacobowski und der Oberst and played a leading part himself.

The theater was mainly used for operas; plays were mostly performed at the Theater am Ostwall.

Theater Dortmund was called Städtische Bühnen Dortmund (Stages of the City of Dortmund).

== Oper Dortmund ==
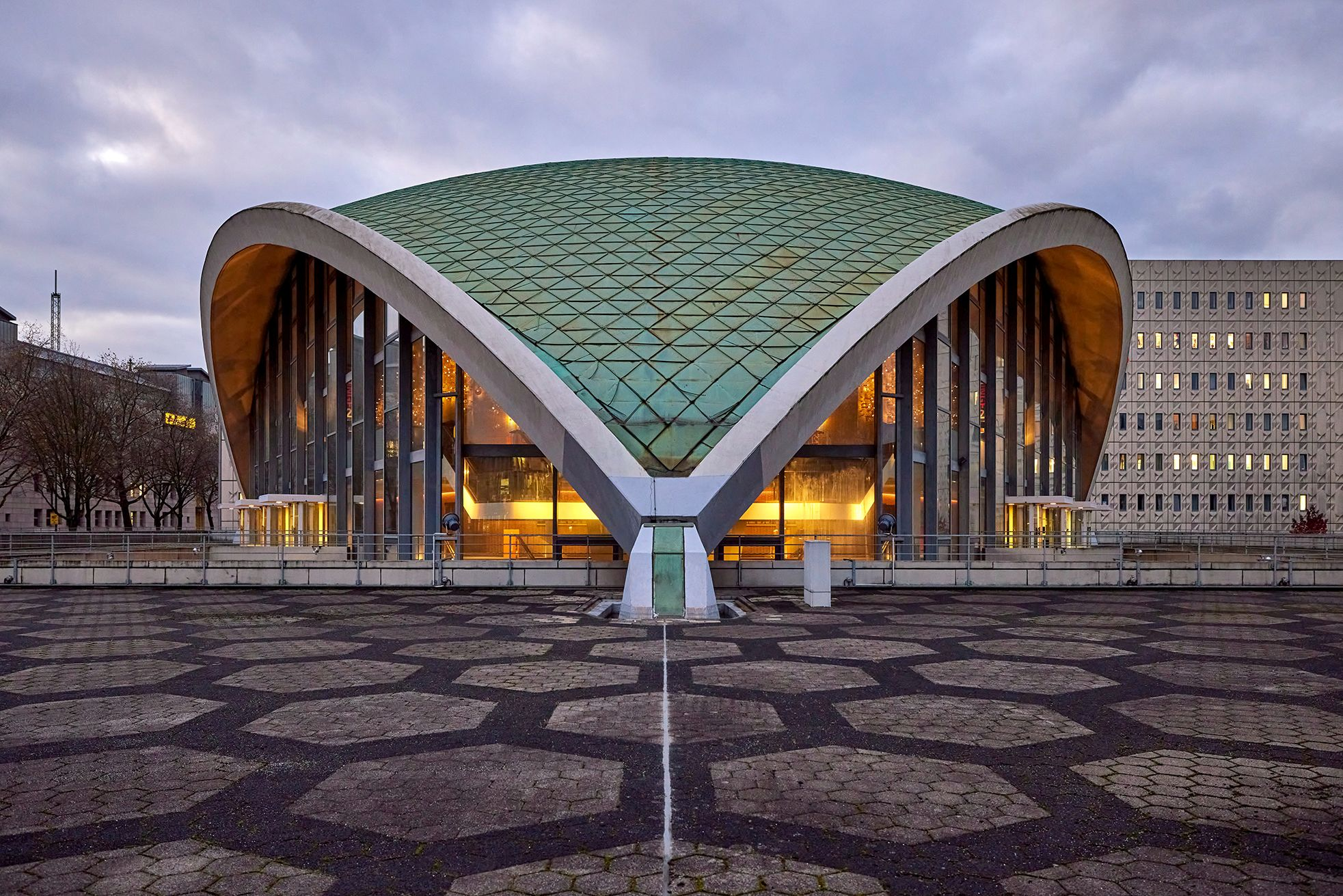
Opernhaus Dortmund

The new opera house Opernhaus Dortmund opened in 1966 to serve as a venue for operas, ballets, concerts, and for plays which require a big stage. The first performance was Der Rosenkavalier of Strauss, an opera which had been performed first in 1911, the year of the works premiere. Wilhelm Schüchter conducted the Dortmunder Philharmoniker. In 1967 he conducted the premiere of the opera Eli of Walter Steffens after the drama of Nelly Sachs, a commission of the city of Dortmund.

The orchestra used the opera house for concerts until 2002, when the Konzerthaus Dortmund was opened.

== Schauspiel Dortmund ==
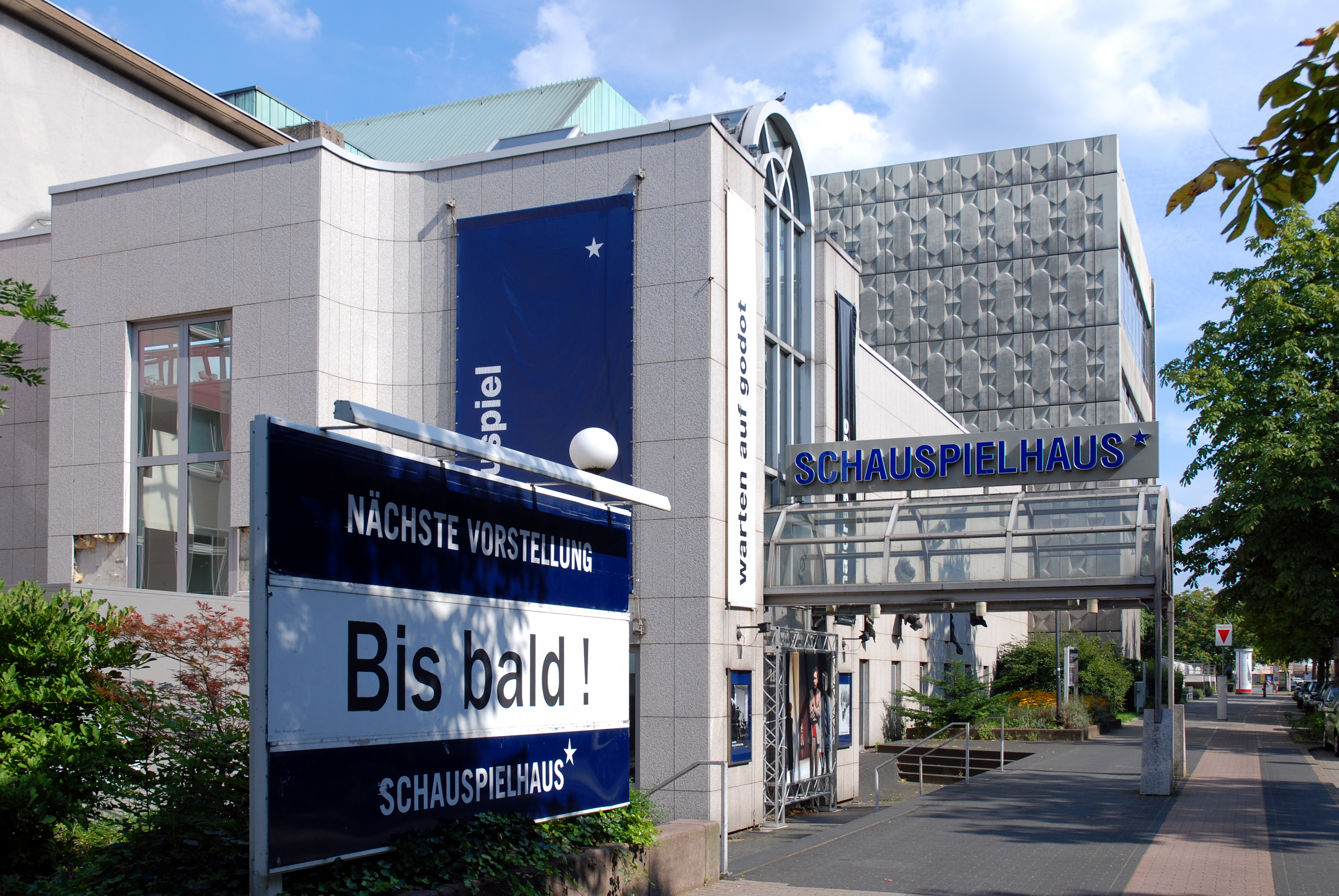
Schauspielhaus Dortmund

Since 1968, the post-war opera house serves as the main stage for plays. Theater Dortmund also operates smaller theaters for more experimental productions. Schauspiel Dortmund and collective Tools for Action won an award for Cultural Education of the Federal Ministry of Culture and the Media of Germany for 2017 for the project Mirror Barricade.

== Konzerthaus Dortmund ==
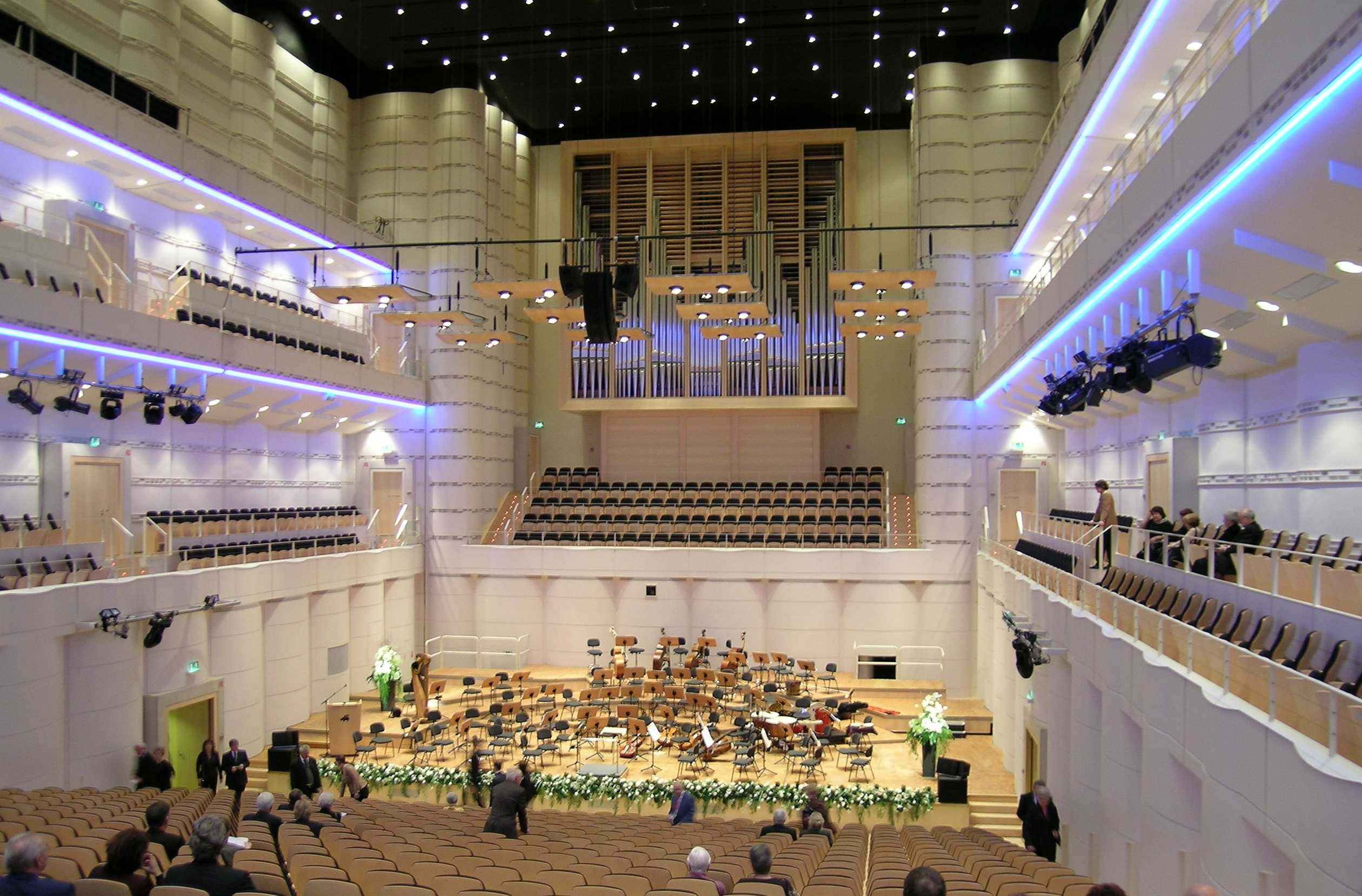
Konzerthaus Dortmund

Since 2002, the orchestra has been using the newly opened concert hall Konzerthaus Dortmund as a venue for the orchestra's concerts and guest performances. The planning and founding director was Ulrich Andreas Vogt.

In the 2005/06 season Rebecca Saunders was composer-in-residence. In December 2008 the Thomanerchor and Gewandhausorchester Leipzig, conducted by Thomaskantor Georg Christoph Biller, performed Bach's Christmas Oratorio. In November 2009 Ignat Solzhenitsyn conducted the Cantemus Chor and the Nordwestdeutsche Philharmonie in works of Mozart including his Great Mass in C minor. In June 2010 Cecilia Bartoli sang in concert the title role of Bellini's Norma for the first time, in the original mezzo-soprano range, with conductor Thomas Hengelbrock.

The Konzerthaus Dortmund is an independent institution, led by Artistic Director Benedikt Stampa since the 2005/06 season.
