= Carla Spletter =

German operatic soprano

- Born: 9 November 1911
- Died: 19 October 1953 (aged 41)
- Education: University of Music and Theatre Leipzig
- Occupation: Operatic soprano

Carla Spletter (9 November 1911 – 19 October 1953) was a German operatic soprano.

== Life ==
Carla Spletter was born in Flensburg, Schleswig-Holstein in Germany in 1911, and studied at the Leipzig Conservatory before making her debut in 1932 at the Deutsche Oper in Berlin. From 1935 to 1945 she was a member of the Berlin State Opera. Her repertoire included Carl Maria von Weber's Oberon (1937) and Johann Strauss II's Eine Nacht in Venedig (1938), both of which she recorded. After 1945 Carla Spletter moved to Hamburg to join the Hamburgische Staatsoper. Her last appearance was that of the title role in Alban Berg's opera Lulu for the German (Grillo-Theater, Essen) and Dutch (Stadsschouwburg, Amsterdam) premieres of that work in March and July 1953 respectively, under the baton of Gustav König. Within a few months (October) she had died in Hamburg of cancer at the age of 41.

In 1937 Carla Spletter married Dr Peter Bischoff, who had won a gold medal in sailing at the 1936 Olympic Games.

== Legacy ==
I addition to her recordings Carla Spletter featured in four feature films, including the title role in Friedrich von Flotow's Martha (1936).

== Selected discography ==
- Mozart: Die Entführung aus dem Serail (Berlin, 24 October 1937), Reichssenders Berlin, conducted by Heinrich Steiner, Cantus-Lin (DA Music) 2000
- Mozart: Great Opera Recordings – Die Zauberflöte (Berlin 1937/1938), Berliner Philharmoniker, conducted by Thomas Beecham, Naxos Historical 2001
- Gounod: Faust (Stuttgart 5 December 1937), Stuttgarter Rundfunks, conducted by Joseph Keilberth, Arkadia 2000
- Mozart: Die Zauberflöte (Berlin 1937–1938), Berliner Philharmoniker, conducted by Thomas Beecham, Naxos Historical 2001
- Weber: Oberon (Highlights, Berlin 15 August 1937), Reichssenders Berlin, conducted by Joseph Keilberth, Cantus-Line (DA Music) 2002
- Johann Strauss: Eine Nacht in Venedig (22 January 1938), Reichssenders Berlin, conducted by Heinrich Steiner, Naxos Historical 2003
- ABC der Gesangskunst in Deutschland – Historisches Gesangslexikon Teil 5, 70 historical recordings, including two arias from La Boheme by Carla Spletter, Cantus-Lin (DA Music), 2000

== Filmography ==
- 1936: Martha, Directed by: Karl Anton/Frank Clifford
- 1937: Der Schauspieldirektor, Directed by: Jürgen von Alten
- 1939: Maria Ilona, Directed by: Géza von Bolváry
- 1940: Falstaff in Wien, Directed by: Leopold Hainisch
