= Fenerbahçe S.K. (sailing) =

Fenerbahçe Doğuş Sailing
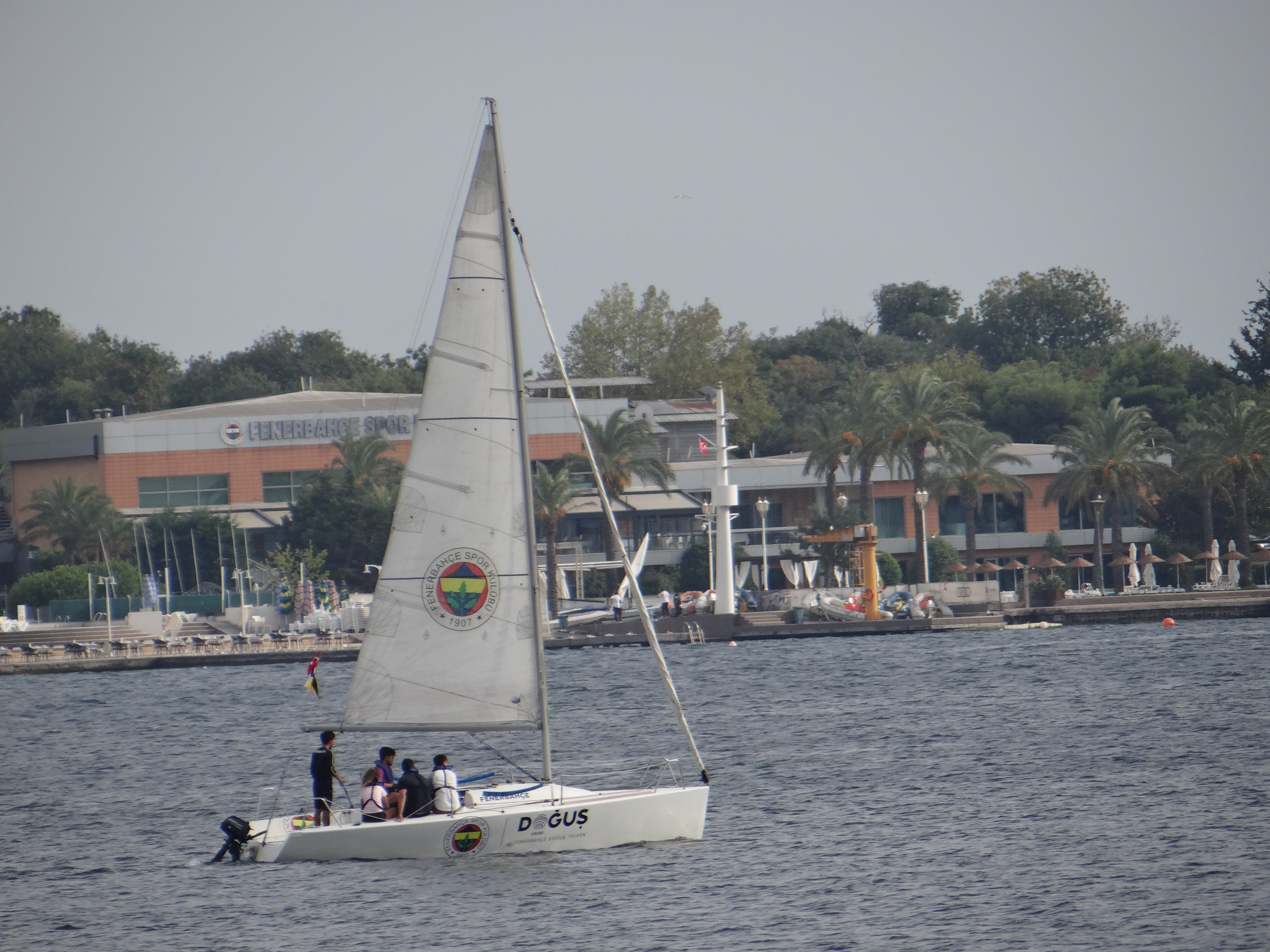
- Full name: Fenerbahçe Sports Club Sailing Section
- Nickname: Sarı Lacivertliler (The Yellow-Navy Blues)
- Short name: Fenerbahçe Sailing
- Founded: 1910
- Ground: Dereağzı Facilities, Istanbul, Turkey
- Chairman: Aziz Yıldırım
- Head coach: Ateş Çınar

Fenerbahçe Sailing (Turkish: Fenerbahçe Yelken Takımı Şubesi) is the men's and women's sailing and windsurfing department of Fenerbahçe S.K., a major sports club in Istanbul, Turkey.

The branch, which started operating in the 1910s, won first place in the Heybeliada races, the first official competition in Turkey, organized under the auspices of the Naval Society Padişah Sultan Reşat on 24 July 1917. The branch represented Turkey for the first time in the Star (sailboat) class at the 1936 Berlin Olympics with Behzat Baydar and Harun Ülman. The sailing branch, which was revived in 1952 when Deniz Bankası provided modern boats to sports clubs, has taken the most distinguished place together with Istanbul Sailing Club and Karşıyaka in the Turkish Championships held since the 1930s, with a total of 210 first places, 163 second places and 109 third places until 2023.

Fenerbahçe athletes Tuğçe Subaşı won the World Championship in the Laser 4.7 class in 2002, Yiğit Yalçın Çıtak in the Laser Radial class, Arda Baykal in the Mediterranean Games in 1993 in the Optimist class, Haluk Babacan the Finn in 1993, Akif Muslubaş again in 1995 in the Finn, Utku Ören in 2002 in the Laser Radial, Yonca Yıldıral and İrem Özdemir in 2006 in the 470, Zeynep Yentür in 2009 and 2010 in the Optimist, Çağla Demirtaş in 2010 in the Laser Radial and Alican Kaynar in the Finn class again in 2010 in the Balkans. In addition to these championships, Aydın Yurdum came second in the World in the Laser Masters category in 1997, Azat Baykal, Levent Özgen and Erdil Uzaltan came fourth in Europe in the Dragon category in 1997, Azat Baykal, Arda Baykal and Erdil Uzaltan came fourth in the World in the Dragon category in 2004, Yonca Yıldıral and Özde Özdemir came third in the 470 World Juniors in 2006, Zeynep Yentür came second in Europe in the Optimist category in 2009 and Çağla Dönertaş came third in Europe in the Laser Radial category in 2012.

== Current squad ==
=== Technical staff ===
Name	Nat.	Position
Kemal Danabaş	(Turkey)	Director
Selma Altay Rodopman	(Turkey)	Department Captain
Stefan de Vries	(Netherlands)	Head Coach
Nazlı Çağla Dönertaş	(Turkey)	Optimist A Team Coach
Arıkan Toksoy	(Turkey)	Optimist B Team Coach
Maria Dolynska Köroğlu	(Ukraine)	420 and 470 Teams Coach
Yaşar Kabakçıoğlu	(Turkey)	Laser Team Coach
Şemsettin Göktai	(Turkey)	Sail Technician

=== Notable sailors ===
- Derin Atakan (born 2006), female kitesurfer
- Yiğit Yalçın Çıtak (born 2001), 2024 Olympian Laser sailor
- Nazlı Çağla Dönertaş (born 1991), female yacht racer
- Alican Kaynar (born 1988), yacht racer
- Çağla Kubat (born 1979), female windsurfer
- Cafer Cicibıyık (born 1991), 470 sailor
- Caner Cicibıyık (born 1991), 470 sailor
- Merve Vatan (born 2005), female windsurfer
