= Paul Hager =

German theatre and opera director

Paul Hager (15 November 1925 – 12 April 1983) was a German theatre and opera director.

== Life ==
Hager was born in Remscheid. His mother, Emmy Hager, née Tillmanns, a pianist, and his father, Franz Paul Hager, general director of the Remscheid Alexanderwerk, were both regular visitors to the Bayreuth Festival. Music and theatre, but also his father's responsible entrepreneurial activities, shaped his childhood. Determined by his father before his early death to become his successor, he studied business administration at Cologne University – after returning from the front – which he completed with the thesis Über die Organisationsgrundlagen des deutschen Kulturtheaters [On the organisational foundations of the German cultured theatre].

He completed his "apprentice years" at the Bavarian State Opera in Munich under the direction of Rudolf Hartmann, Heinz Arnold (directors), Georg Solti, Eugen Jochum, Ferenc Fricsay (conductors), Carl Orff (composer) and at the Bayreuth Festival under Wieland Wagner (director), Hans Knappertsbusch, Herbert von Karajan (conductors). After his first own productions in Nuremberg, he became Germany's youngest artistic director in Heidelberg in the 1953/54 season.

In the autumn of 1954, his collaboration with the San Francisco Opera began with the production of Puccini's La bohème for the opera house's festival season, which was to last 30 years. In addition to the established opera repertoire, his productions also included American first performances: in 1954, Honegger's Jeanne d'Arc au bûcher, in 1958, Orff's Die Kluge (title role Leontyne Price) and Carmina Burana (conductor Leopold Ludwig), (stage design Jean-Pierre Ponnelle), in 1959, Richard Strauss' Die Frau ohne Schatten, in 1960, Shostakovich's Ekaterina Ismailova. In 1973, he was awarded the San Francisco Opera Medal for his merits.

From the 1957/58 season onwards, Hager was also a regular guest director at the Staatstheater Stuttgart where he directed Richard Strauss' Der Rosenkavalier (1964, conductor Ferdinand Leitner) and Elektra (1971, conductor Carlos Kleiber). In 1967 he brought out a new production of Orff's Antigonae, which was invited to the theatre festival in Athens.

In 1958, Herbert von Karajan brought him to the Vienna State Opera as administrative head of the orchestra, which he left in 1964. Of his productions at this house, Leoncavallo's Pagliacci was performed 150 times until 1982 and Gounod's Faust 54 times until 1977. This Viennese period also saw his directorial work for the Salzburg Festival: in 1961, the world premiere of Rudolf Wagner-Régeny's Das Bergwerk von Falun (conductor: Heinz Wallberg) and Mozart's Idomeneo (conductor: Herbert von Karajan).

In 1964, Erich Schumacher engaged him as head of the Grillo-Theater's opera company in Essen. In addition, guest performance engagements took him to the Mannheim National Theatre (Salome with Gloria Davy in the title role), to Stuttgart, Cologne, Lyon, to the Milan Scala (Mascagni's Cavalleria rusticana) and the Teatro Colón in Buenos Aires (Der Rosenkavalier with Sena Jurinac, Christa Ludwig, Walter Berry, conductor Erich Leinsdorf).

After a crisis-ridden period in which the continued existence of the Theater Dortmund was dramatically questioned, Hager took over the artistic direction of the newly established Städtische Bühnen Dortmund as general director in 1975, together with the administrative director Karlheinz Engels. At that time, the house covered opera, drama, and dance, as well as children's and youth theatre. In 1976 in the Opernhaus Dortmund, Siegfried completed Wagner's Der Ring des Nibelungen, which had begun with Die Walküre, conducted by Wilhelm Schüchter. In 1977/78, in Wagnerian tradition, followed Die Meistersinger von Nürnberg and Parsifal. Here, too, he succeeded in realising his special predilection for modern music drama with Berg's Lulu (1977/78) and Fortner's Bluthochzeit (1975/76).

Hager is known as a man of opera, music, music drama and as a theatre director, an organiser. But he was also a performer. Already early in 1949, he liked to be on stage himself in small roles in Munich (as in Joseph Haas's opera Tobias Wunderlich); in Heidelberg he saved an evening performance by taking over the title role in Molière's The Imaginary Invalid. During a rehearsal for Tchaikovsky's The Queen of Spades, he collapsed on stage in 1983 and died shortly afterwards in hospital at the age of 57. Hager had two children.
