= Lulu (opera) =

Second opera by Alban Berg

- Opera by Alban Berg
- 1974 Spoleto production poster
- Librettist: Berg
- Language: German
- Based on: Erdgeist and Die Büchse der Pandora by Frank Wedekind
- Premiere: 2 June 1937; Zurich Opera

Lulu (1929–35; premiered incomplete 1937, complete 1979) is an opera that Austrian composer Alban Berg created from Frank Wedekind's Erdgeist (Earth Spirit, 1895) and Die Büchse der Pandora (Pandora's Box, 1904). Berg used twelve-tone technique amid rising cultural hostility and died having almost finished the opera. Its two acts and finale were staged until Friedrich Cerha finished act 3 from Berg's short score and sketches in 1979. Theodor W. Adorno called it "one of those works that reveals the extent of its quality the longer and more deeply one immerses oneself in it."

Lulu, an ambiguous femme fatale, is framed by chiastic structures in the music drama. Her first husband dies upon finding her with her next husband, who dies by suicide upon learning she has been married off and sexually exploited since childhood. She marries a businessman she says rescued and loved her. As he tries to kill her, she kills him. Aided by her lesbian admirer Geschwitz, she escapes prison and flees to Paris with her lover Alwa, the businessman's son. A stock market crash ruins them, reducing her to prostitution in London. Clients, her husbands' doppelgängers, kill Alwa, her, and Geschwitz.

== Background ==
=== Source texts and treatment ===
Berg based Lulu on Wedekind's two Lulu plays: Erdgeist for the first half, and Die Büchse der Pandora for the second. Berg likely read Erdgeist by 1903. He saw writer–journalist Karl Kraus's production of Die Büchse der Pandora on 29 May 1905. In an introductory speech, which Berg admired, Kraus called Lulu "destroyer of all because everyone destroyed her". A former street child, she is an attractive 15-year-old and sometime dancer, prostitute, or mistress. Her old pimp Schigolch may be her father or sexual partner.

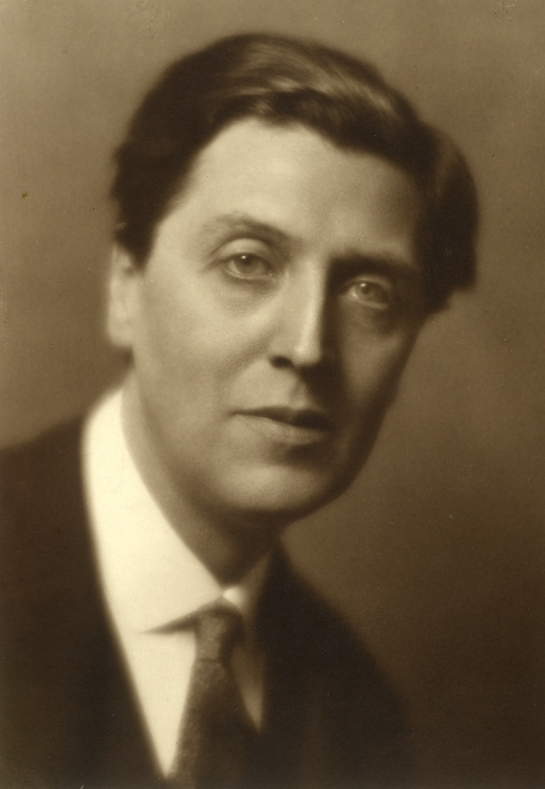
Berg, 1927 (Georg Fayer)

Berg repeatedly maps identities and reverses roles in the chiastic music drama, tying her three doomed husbands to her three fateful clients. He remakes Alwa, Wedekind's dramatist, into a composer, his self-portrait (Lulu's apparent antithesis). He may have modeled Geschwitz on his lesbian sister Smaragda, Dr. Schön on his teacher Arnold Schoenberg, the Painter on Richard Gerstl, and Schigolch on his wife Helene's possible father Franz Joseph I of Austria. As in Wozzeck, the physician may represent society. In Lulu, he promptly dies of shock.

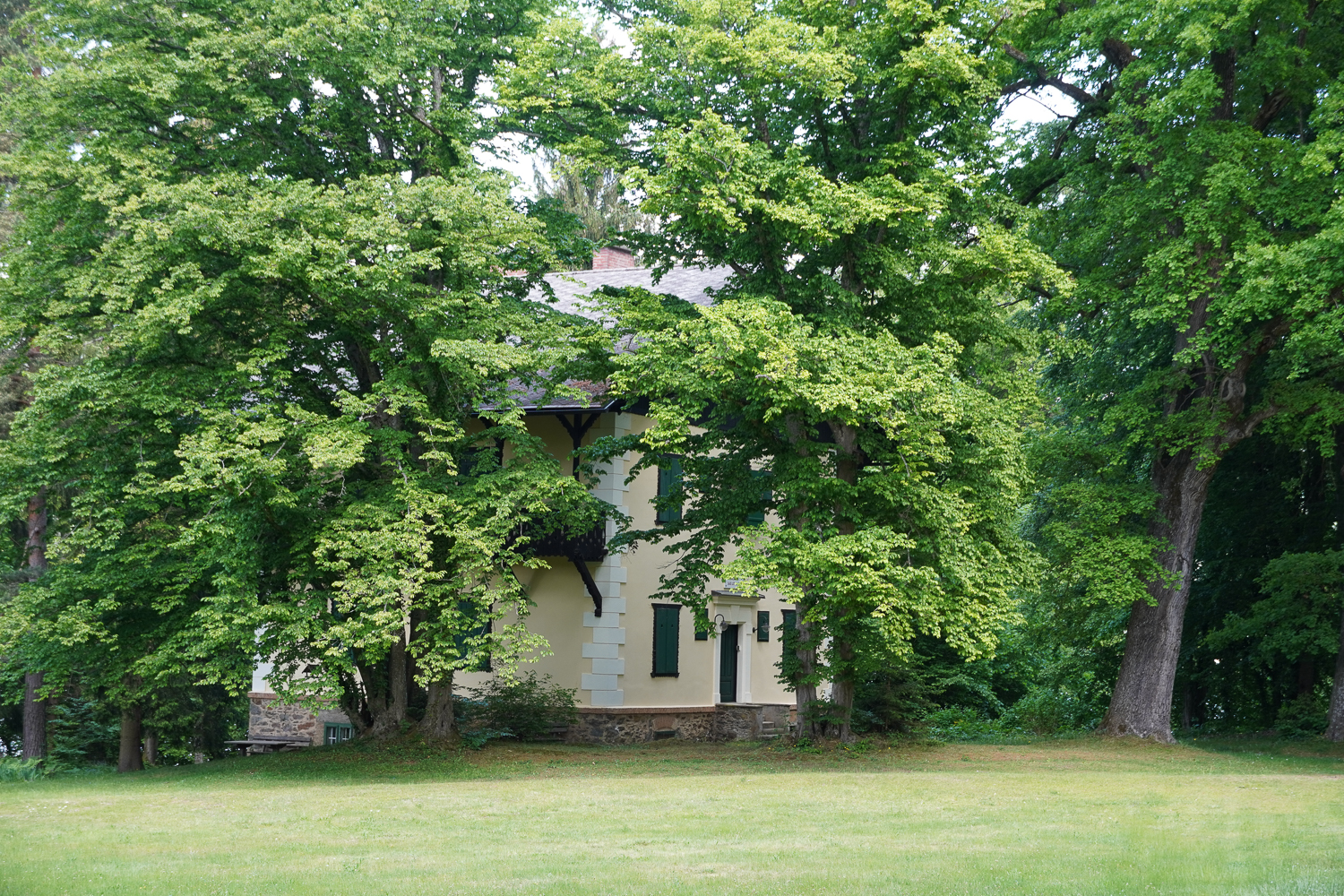
Berg's Waldhaus

=== History of composition process ===
==== 1929–1932: Lulu's compositional milieu ====
Wozzeck's success funded Lulu, on which Berg worked from 1929, including at his secluded Carinthian Waldhaus (house in the woods). There, he likely enjoyed about 100 recordings spanning excerpts of operas by Richard Wagner and Giacomo Meyerbeer, operetta selections, and lighter music, including soubrette Hansi Führer's Styrian Schnadahüpfl (Note: Austrian Schnadahüpfl are song forms in Alpine folk music.) and yodeling. Führer's career at Danzers Orpheum, Venedig in Wien, and the Ronacher may be echoed in Lulu's theatrical milieu.

In 1930, Berg signed a publishing contract naming Universal Edition owner of the music manuscripts. By 1931 he owned a radio, writing Schoenberg that he listened to music from across Europe. Singer Arthur Collins's widely circulated 1905 recording of Albert Von Tilzer's ragtime "Rufus Rastus Johnson Brown" could have inspired Lulu's jazz elements.

As antisemitism grew, Berg and Schoenberg, who was Jewish, were disparagingly linked, and the Soviet Union banned Wozzeck as "bourgeois". Many European theaters dropped the opera. The Weimar Republic's last productions, including the Berlin State Opera's under Erich Kleiber, were in 1932.

==== 1933–1935: Suppression and Lulu Suite ====
In Nazi Germany, Berg's work was labeled "cultural Bolshevism" and "degenerate music". In spring 1934, conductor Wilhelm Furtwängler wrote Berg that Lulu's Berlin debut was doomed, so Berg prepared the Lulu Suite, Five Symphonic Pieces for coloratura soprano and orchestra. (Note: Symphonische Stücke aus der Oper "Lulu", or Symphonic Pieces from the Opera "Lulu")

In a September letter for Schoenberg's 60th birthday, Berg dedicated Lulu to him, enclosing the prologue and several following measures. Identifying himself with Alwa and Schoenberg with Schön, Berg quoted Alwa's opening question, "May I enter?", (Note: "Darf ich eintreten?") from this excerpt.

In this letter, Berg hoped that the opera would be recognized within the German musical tradition shaped by Schoenberg. Kleiber led the Suite's Berlin premiere on November 30, four days before resigning. Die Musik issued a harsh review, Nazi official Joseph Goebbels decried atonal composers' "moral decay", and the Neue Zeitschrift für Musik chided positive press as ideologically confused.

For Berg's upcoming 50th birthday in January 1935, Schoenberg wrote Berg expressing faith in their artistic cause, shared also with Anton Webern, amid the political and cultural turmoil. He enclosed an eight-line poem set to a birthday canon for mixed chorus. (Note: Kanon für Alban Berg zum 50. Geburtstag) The canon also opens with Alwa's question, evoking an endless, reciprocal welcome. Berg replied in February, thanking him, praising the canon, and noting its musical allusions to Lulu. Berg soon made a piano reduction of the canon.

==== 1935: Lulu interrupted ====
Also that January, violinist Louis Krasner offered Berg $1,500 for a concerto. Berg hesitated to set Lulu aside but, facing ruin, had accepted and begun by late March. He heard the Suite's 20 March BBC broadcast, produced by Edward Clark, from London's Queen's Hall under Adrian Boult. After his close friend Alma Mahler's daughter Manon Gropius died on April 22, he focused on the Violin Concerto in her memory, finishing by August.

Berg attended the Suite's December 11 Vienna premiere and died December 24. Act 3, mostly in short score with sketched orchestration, was completely finished only through its first 268 bars and suite selections (the variations and Geschwitz's epilogue).

== Composition ==
Lulu at work (costume sketch, David Borovsky)

Like Wozzeck, Lulu is a tragedy of protagonists victimized by social forces.

=== Dramatic overview ===
Prologue: The Animal Tamer calls for the serpent, Lulu.

The Painter

Act 1, scene 1: In a late-19th-century, vaguely Viennese studio, Lulu poses for her portrait. Dr. Schön and his son Alwa visit. They leave, the Painter ravishes her, and Dr. Goll, her physician husband, breaks the door open on them and drops dead, horrifying the Painter and leaving Lulu, who seems evasive, rich (transformation music). Scene 2: Her portrait sells well after she marries the Painter, but as the beggar Schigolch visits and Schön rejects her, the Painter uncovers horrifying truths and dies by suicide, prompting Lulu to insist that Schön marry her. Scene 3: Lulu and Alwa discuss the Prince, who wants to marry her, but amid another confrontation with Schön, she persuades him to break his engagement to a more respectable woman.

Act 2, scene 1: Geschwitz, Schigolch's clients, and Alwa all pay Lulu amorous visits. Her husband Schön confronts her jealously and demands her suicide, which he tries to stage, clasping a revolver into her hands and trying to make her shoot herself. She manages to shoot him dead and offers Alwa her fidelity in exchange for freedom before police arrive. Film interlude: She is arrested, tried, convicted, and imprisoned but escapes from an isolation ward. Scene 2: After plans to free her unfold and Geschwitz helps her contract cholera, Lulu returns disguised as Geschwitz, rejoices at her freedom, and rekindles her intimate relationship with Alwa, who idealizes her. They elope to Paris.

The Negro

Act 3, scene 1: At Lulu's birthday party, blackmail, sexual exploitation, and financial ruin close in on her, leading her to manipulate Geschwitz and persuade Schigolch to kill one blackmailer. As the stock market crashes, she and Alwa narrowly escape police (transformation – variations). Scene 2: In London, Lulu survives by prostitution as perhaps before in her childhood, while Alwa faces his ruin. Seeking money, Schigolch finds a book of homilies in the coat of Lulu's first client, the Professor (the double of her first husband Dr. Goll), who discreetly pays Lulu in advance. Her second client, a self-proclaimed prince (the Negro, the Painter's double) refuses to pay, attacks Lulu, and bludgeons Alwa. Geschwitz, lovesick, contemplates suicide. Lulu is so captivated by or afraid of her third client, Jack the Ripper (Schön's double), that she accedes to his demand to waive payment. He murders Lulu and stabs the devoted Geschwitz, who dies singing to Lulu.

=== Scoring ===
==== Roles ====
Roles, voice types, premiere casts in Zürich, Paris
Role	Voice type or Fach	Zürich Opera premiere, 2-act version, 2 June 1937 Conductor: Robert Denzler	Paris Opéra premiere, 3-act version, 24 February 1979 Conductor: Pierre Boulez
Lulu	Hoher Sopran	Bahrija Nuri Hadžić	Teresa Stratas
Countess Martha Geschwitz	Dramatischer Mezzosopran	Maria Bernhard	Yvonne Minton
A theatrical dresser (Eine Theater-Garderobiere) (Act 1); A schoolboy (Ein Gymnasiast) (Act 2); Bob, A valet (Ein Groom) (Act 3)	Alt	Frida Kurz; Erika Feichtinger –	Hanna Schwarz
The Painter, Lulu's second husband (Act 1); The Negro (Act 3)	Lyrischer Tenor	Paul Feher –	Robert Tear
Dr. Ludwig Schön, (Chefredakteur), editor-in-chief (Acts 1 & 2); Jack the Ripper (Act 3)	Heldenbariton	Asger Stig –	Franz Mazura
Alwa, Dr. Schön's son, a composer	Jugendlicher Heldentenor	Peter Baxevanos	Kenneth Riegel
Schigolch, an old man	Hoher Charakterbass	Fritz Honisch	Toni Blankenheim
Doctor Goll (Der Medizinalrat – Medical officer), Lulu's first husband	spoken	Peter Poschl	Toni Blankenheim
An animal tamer (Tierbändiger) (Prolog); Rodrigo, (Ein Athlet), an Athlete (Note: Frequently referred to in English translations as "acrobat") (Acts 2 & 3)	Heldenbass mit Buffo-Einschlag	Albert Emmerich	Gerd Nienstedt
The prince, a traveller in Africa / The manservant / The marquis	Tenor-Buffo	Oscar Mörwald (role of Marquis not sung in 1937)	Helmut Pampuch
The theatre manager	Bass-Buffo (tief)	Walter Frank	Jules Bastin
The professor A clown A stagehand	silent		Le Nain Roberto
A 15-year-old girl	Opernsoubrette		Daniele Chlostawa
Her mother	Alt		Ursula Boese
A woman artist	Mezzosopran		Anna Ringart
The Banker	Hoher Bass		Jules Bastin
A journalist	Hoher Bariton		Claude Méloni
The police commissioner	spoken		Toni Blankenheim
A manservant	Tiefer Bariton		Pierre-Yves Le Maigat
Pianist, stage manager, attendants of the prince, policemen, nurses, wardresses, dancers, party guests, servants, workers

Dr. Goll mirrors the silent Professor (and is sometimes cast as him)

Many cast members besides Lulu's husbands have multiple roles, including the Dresser–Schoolboy–Valet (mezzo-soprano breeches role), Prince–Manservant–Marquis (tenor), Theater Manager–Banker (high bass), and Animal Tamer–Athlete (bass buffo).

The characters have proper names, though Berg names only Lulu, Dr. Schön, Alwa, Geschwitz, Schigolch, and, in dialogue, the Painter Walter Schwarz. Wedekind's evocative names (Note: Besides Schön (lit. 'beautiful') and Schwarz (lit. 'black'), Geschwitz is a contraction of Geschlechterwitz (lit. 'joke about sex/gender or [noble] lineage' [Geschlecht]). Schigolch may be an amalgamation of [Lust]molch (lit. '[lust] newt', lecher) and logisch (lit. 'logical'). Quast (lit. 'brush') refers to hair. Wedekind's Journalist is female and named Steinherz (lit. 'heart of stone'). Puntschu derives from Bundschuh.) are sometimes applied to Berg's more archetypal roles (e.g., the Athlete Rodrigo Quast, the Banker Puntschu).

==== Instrumentation ====
Woodwinds
3 flutes (all doubling piccolos)
3 oboes (3rd doubling English horn)
3 clarinets in B♭ (1st and 2nd doubling E♭ clarinets)
bass clarinet in B♭
alto saxophone in E♭
3 bassoons (3rd doubling contrabassoon)
Brass
4 horns in F
3 trumpets in C
3 trombones
tuba

Percussion
timpani
triangle
tambourine
snare drum
jazz drum
bass drum
cymbals
switch
2 tam-tams (high and low)
xylophone
vibraphone
Keyboard
piano

Strings
harp
violins I
violins II
violas
cellos
double basses

The onstage jazz band in act 1, scene 3 (instrumentalists can be drawn from the pit players) consists of:

2 clarinets in B♭
alto saxophone in E♭
tenor saxophone in B♭
2 Jazz trumpets in C
2 Jazz trombones
sousaphone

Jazz drum set (3 players)
banjo
piano
3 violins with jazz horns
contrabass

In act 3, scene 2, Cerha's edition uses a small onstage ensemble that requires:

piccolo
flute
3 clarinets in B♭
bass clarinet in B♭
contrabassoon

Lulu is arguably the first seminal work of western art music that used the vibraphone, an instrument that had previously been associated with jazz. However, it has been used in smaller works by major composers prior to Lulu, such as Maurice Ravel's orchestrations of Don Quichotte à Dulcinée and Ronsard à son âme ^{[fr]} (1933 and 1935 respectively), as well as Darius Milhaud's incidental music to L'annonce faite à Marie (1932).

=== Music ===
Berg was obsessed with symmetry in his works and Lulu is no exception, the whole being perceived as a palindrome or mirror. Lulu's popularity in the first act is mirrored by the squalor she lives in during act 3, and this is emphasised by Lulu's husbands in act 1 being played by the same singers as her clients in act 3. Roles have distinctive motifs and tone-rows, while Tristan und Isolde quotations symbolize love and death, and forbidden desire.

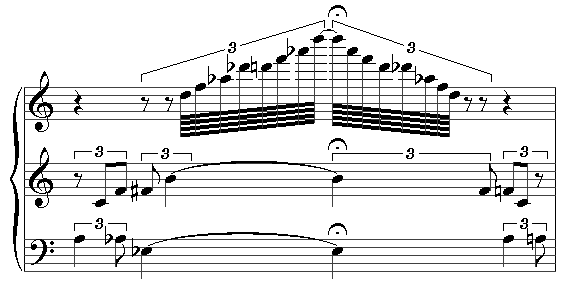
Midpoint

The mirrorlike structure is further emphasized by the film interlude at act 2 at the midpoint. The events shown in the film are a miniature version of the mirror structure of the opera as a whole (Lulu enters prison and then leaves again) and the music accompanying the film is an exact palindrome – it reads the same forwards as backwards. The centre of this palindrome is indicated by an arpeggio played on the piano, first rising, then falling (shown here on the top staff).

Berg assigns specific vocal styles to each character with descriptive orchestral representation, recapitulative episodes to emphasise psychological significance and pitch-sets. Recapitulation includes having single singers performing multiple roles. The use of pitch includes the use of twelve-tone rows.

Pierrot, as whom Lulu is portrayed

Lulu on her birthday

Alwa

Dr. Schön

Schoolboy

==== Tone rows ====
Cell z (also one of the basic cells in Bartók's String Quartet No. 4) is the basic cell of Lulu and generates trope I:

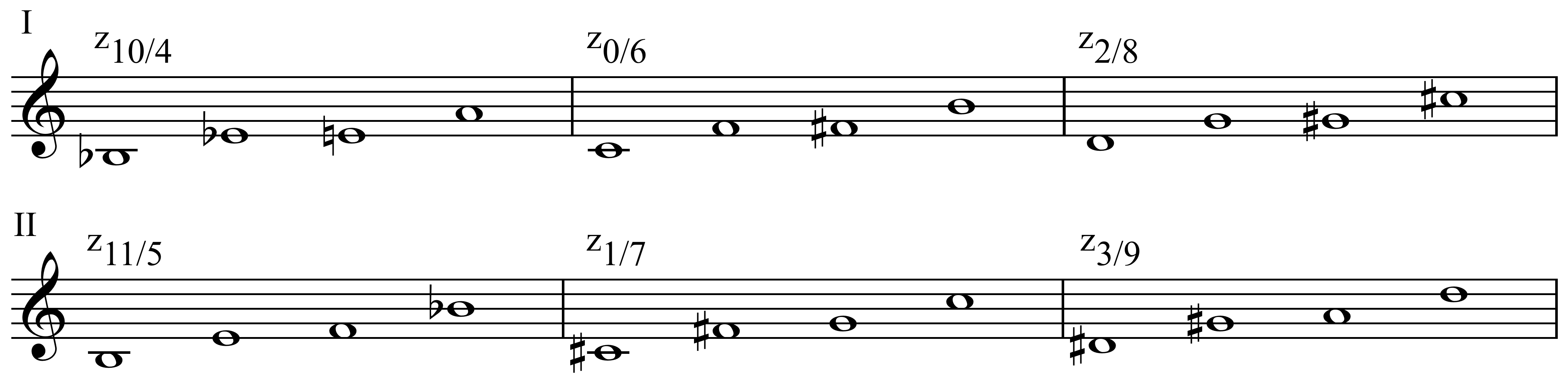
The two non-identical forms of trope I, each generated from all even or odd forms of cell z

Although some of Lulu is freely composed, Berg also makes use of Schoenberg's twelve-tone technique. Rather than using one tone row for the entire work, however, he gives each character his or her own tone row, meaning that the tone rows act rather like the leitmotifs in Wagner's operas.

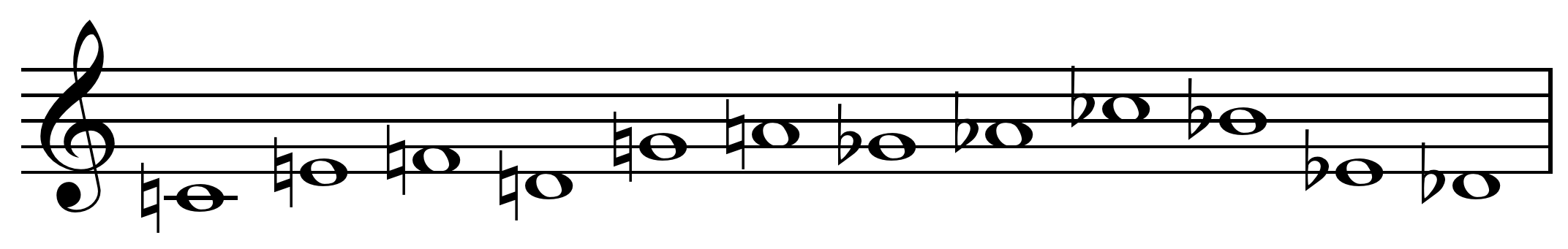
Berg's Lulu basic tone row on C

From this one tone row, Berg derives tone rows for many of the characters. For example, the tone row associated with Lulu herself is: F, G, A♭, B♭, C, D, F♯, D♯, E, A, B, C♯. This row is constructed by extracting one note (F) from the basic row's first trichord, then taking the next note (G) from the basic row's second trichord, then taking the third note (A♭) from the basic row's third trichord, and so on, cycling through the basic row three times.

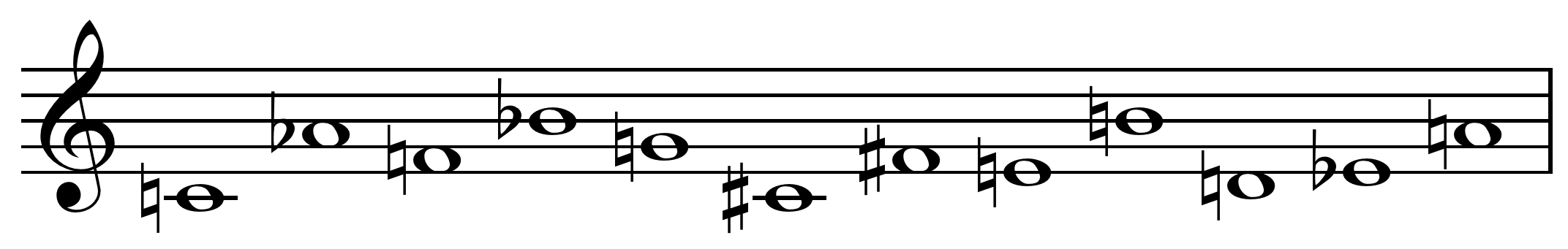
Berg's Lulu Alwa tone row on C

The tone row associated with Alwa is arrived at by repeating the basic tone row over and over and taking every seventh note;

Derivation of Alwa series from basic series by taking every seventh note from repetitions of the basic series.

this results in the following tone row: B♭, F♯, E♭, G♯, F, B, E, D, A, C, C♯, G

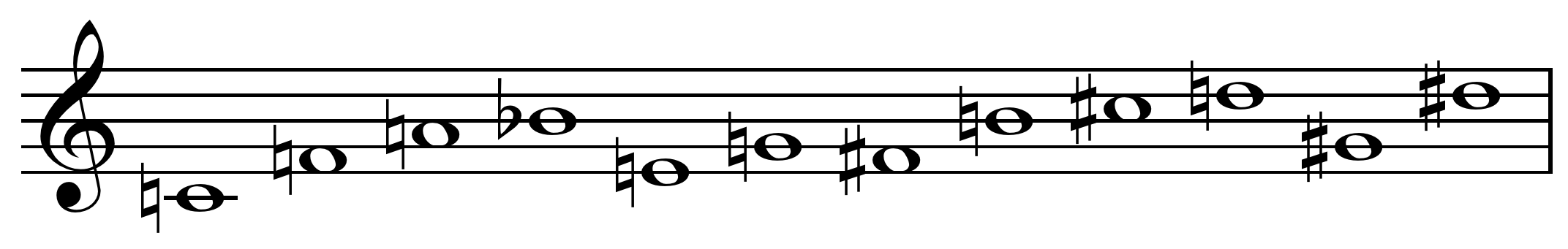
Berg's Lulu Dr. Schön tone row on C

Similarly, the tone row associated with Dr. Schön is arrived at by repeating the basic tone row (as in the previous example) and taking the first note, missing one note, taking the next, missing two, taking the next, missing three, taking the next, missing three, taking the next, missing two, taking the next, missing one, taking the next, missing one, taking the next, missing two, taking the next, and so on; this results in the following tone row: B♭, E♭, G, G♯, D, F, E, A, B, C, F♯, C♯

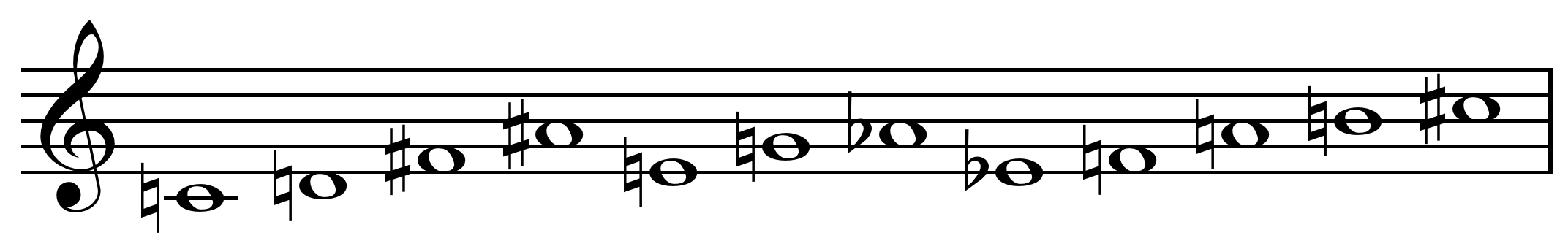
Berg's Lulu Schoolboy tone row on C

=== Musicodramatic synopsis ===
Animal Tamer

==== Prologue ====
The Clown beats a bass drum and cymbal, accompanying the Animal Tamer, (Note: Tierbändiger) who welcomes the audience (Note: Hereinspaziert in die Menagerie (Step right up to the menagerie)) and introduces the menagerie's animals, including the serpent, Lulu (Lulu motif).

==== Act 1 ====
===== Scene 1 =====
Studio

She poses as Pierrot with a shepherd's crook. After news editor Dr. Schön and his son Alwa visit, the Painter chases and ravishes her (canon), calling her Gnädige Frau, (Note: Dearest Lady) Nelly, and Eva.

Dr. Schön

Her husband, Dr. Goll, breaks the door open on them and drops dead. After some coy denial (canzonetta), (Note: Auf einmal springt er auf (He'll leap up momentarily)) she says she is rich. The Painter, horrified, questions her (duet). She repeats "I don't know" (Ich weiss es nicht, echoing Parsifal). The Painter tells Goll's corpse he would trade places (arioso). (Note: Ich möchte tauschen)

Verwandlungsmusik (Transformation Music)

===== Scene 2 =====
Apartment drawing room

Lulu and Schigolch's visit (Anja Silja and Hans Hotter)

Lulu's portrait sold profitably, the Painter gushes. Schön's engagement notice stings her. The Painter finds her ravishing (love duettino). (Note: Du siehst heute reizend aus) The asthmatic beggar Schigolch rings and visits "Lulu" covertly (wind nonet). (Note: Den hab'ich mir auch ganz anders (I had imagined him [the Painter] differently)) As they reminisce, she confides that she feels reduced to an animal. (Note: She says "ein Tier", hinting at her sense of dehumanization and identity disturbance.) The doorbell rings.

Schigolch

Schigolch exits as Schön enters, renouncing her. They argue (sonata). "I belong to you", she cries (coda: love theme, monoritmica). Schön insists. Furious, she withdraws.

External videos
- Analysis of the coda (Note: Patricia Hall is a Lulu scholar.)

The Painter returns. Schön says he sent Mignon (Lulu), a 12-year-old flower seller, to an "aunt". He calls Schigolch Lulu's father. Lulu tried supplanting Schön's wife, so he married her off. He helped promote the Painter, who, shaken, agrees to restrain her. She returns.

The Painter groans behind a locked door. Alwa rings and enters, mentioning revolution in Paris. (Note: In Paris ist Revolution ausgebrochen (Revolution has broken out in Paris), mm. 789–793) They break down the door: the Painter is dead. She screams. Schön phones police, mentioning the Painter's persecutory delusions. She suggests a newspaper extra to divert attention. The doorbell rings. She tells Schön he will marry her (Lulu motif).

Interlude (Love theme)

===== Scene 3 =====
Alwa

Theater dressing room with her portrait poster

A jazz band plays ragtime, perhaps Alwa's. She and he discuss the Prince taking her to Africa. Alwa envisioned Lulu replacing his late mother. A bell calls her. She is dancing in a tutu to bag a rich husband. Smitten, Alwa imagines a Lulu opera (Wozzeck quotation). Applause intrudes.

The Prince enters. He will marry her ("Treulich geführt" quotation). Alwa says Schön's reviews made her famous.

Bells ring. Staff rush her backstage. She fainted at Schön and his fiancée. Schön says she is making a scene to trap him. (Note: Wie kannst Du die Szene gegen mich ausspielen?) Everyone comments, voices clamoring (sextet). The show resumes. She dictates Schön's breakup letter (letter duet). (Note: Sehr geehrtes Fräulein) He foresees his execution (Note: Hinrichtung) but cannot resist. She retakes the stage.

==== Act 2 ====
===== Scene 1 =====
Renaissance-style parlor

Countess Geschwitz visits Schön's wife Lulu with a ball invitation and flowers, and offers to paint her portrait, admiring it before leaving. Schön draws a revolver, reflecting on his madness. (Note: Irrsinn) Lulu asks for his afternoon (cavatina). (Note: Könntest Du Dich für heute Nachmittag nicht freimachen?) He claims to have business. They go to the bedroom. Geschwitz covertly reenters.

Athlete

Schigolch returns "home", he says, with clients: the Athlete and Schoolboy. Lulu reenters wearing a ball gown and flowers. They fantasize about her, including Schigolch, who denies being her father (canon). (Note: Er hat sie nämlich ursprünglich heiraten wollen (She was the one he [the Prince] originally wanted to marry); Wer hat sie nicht ursprünglich heiraten wollen! (Who has not always wanted to marry her!)) Lulu agrees she never had one. They discuss Schön's paranoia.

The Manservant announces "Herr Dr. Schön". The clients hide. Schigolch leaves. Alwa enters. (The elder Schön lurks.) He waxes poetic (hymnal music) (Note: Ich hab' auch nur Fleisch und Blut. Und wenn wir nicht wie Geschwister nebeneinander aufgewachsen waren ... (I'm only flesh and blood too [quoting Wozzeck]. And if we hadn't grown up as siblings ...); Eine Seele, die sich im Jenseits den Schlaf aus den Augen reibt (A soul rubbing the sleep from its eyes in the hereafter)) and takes her hand, asking if she loves him (Tristan chord). (Note: Liebst Du mich Mignon? (Do you love me, Mignon?)) She does not know, she repeats: she poisoned his mother. (Schön draws on the Athlete, who points to Alwa.)

Mentioning revolution, Schön barricades Alwa and hands Lulu the revolver (5-strophe aria), (Note: Du Kreatur; You creature) urging suicide to save Alwa. She testfires. Schön retakes it and barricades Geschwitz. Lulu proposes divorce. Schön demands suicide, handing back the gun. She can only live "as what I am" (Lied der Lulu). (Note: Song of Lulu: als was ich bin; Berg dedicated this coloratura aria to Anton Webern.) Schön tries forcing the "murderess" into a staged suicide (5th strophe). (Note: Nieder, Mörderin! In die Knie! (Get down, murderess, on your knees!)) The Schoolboy interrupts. Lulu empties five rounds into Schön, killing him.

Alwa seizes Lulu. She offers her fidelity for freedom (arietta). (Note: Du kannst mich nicht dem Gericht ausliefern! (You cannot deliver me up to the Law!)) The doorbell rings. "The police are here", (Note: Die Polizei ist da) says Alwa.

Lulu imprisoned

===== Film =====
A silent film set to tumultuous, rhythmic music shows her yearlong imprisonment in palindrome: arrest, detention, trial, cell-door closure, reflection in water (emphasizing her eyes), cell-door opening, doctors' rounds, hospitalization, and escape.

===== Scene 2 =====
The same parlor, darker

Geschwitz, Alwa, and the Athlete discuss the prison escape. The Athlete will elope with Lulu to Paris. Schigolch takes the frail Geschwitz to hospital.

Alwa and the Athlete (tone clusters) clash over money and Alwa's lewd melodrama portraying Lulu. The Schoolboy, having broken out of juvenile detention, interrupts with a plan to free Lulu (chamber music). (Note: Mit wem habe ich (With whom have I)) Alwa and the Athlete say she died and throw him out.

Lulu

Schigolch returns with the sickly Lulu, reassuring her about the coming border crossing (melodrama). (Note: Hü, kleine Lulu: – wir müssen heut' noch über die Grenze (Ho, little Lulu: we must cross the border today)) Repulsed, the Athlete exits. Schigolch fetches rail tickets. "Oh, freedom!", she cries exultantly. (Note: O Freiheit! Herrgott in Himmel! (Oh, freedom! Thank God in Heaven!)) She and Geschwitz traded places on a cholera ward.

Alwa and Lulu revisit her portrait, kiss, and caress (love duet (Note: Mit deinem Bild kannst du es immer noch aufnehmen (You can still compete with your portrait) ... In deinen Augen schimmert es, wie der Wasserspiegel (There's a shimmer in your eyes, like the water's surface) ... Ich werde einen Dithyrambus schreiben (I'll write a dithyramb)) – Alwa's hymn). (Note: Durch dieses Kleid empfinde ich Deinen Wuchs wie Musik (Through this dress I feel your body like music)) She mentions Schön. Alwa hushes her.

==== Act 3 ====
===== Scene 1 =====
Grand drawing room, Paris

The Athlete toasts "Countess Adelaide" (Lulu) at her birthday party. The Marquis eyes a 15-year-old girl. Guests play baccarat and discuss their thriving Jungfrau Railway shares.

The Marquis is blackmailing Lulu (duet). (Note: Sag es nur gleich heraus (Tell me without delay)) He cannot wait for cash proceeds and wants her only for sex trafficking (Lied des Mädchenhändlers, (Note: Song of the girl merchant) quoting Wedekind's Lautenlieder (Note: Lute songs) No. 10 "Konfession"). She refuses (Lied der Lulu reprise). (Note: Als ich fünfzehn Jahre alt war, hätte mir das gefallen können (When I was 15, I might've liked it)) A Cairo brothel has outbid her bounty.

The Athlete delivers his own blackmail letter. Geschwitz approaches, saying Lulu has not requited her love. The Athlete menaces Lulu (duet). (Note: Einen Moment! Hast du meinen Brief gelesen? (One moment! Have you read my letter?)) The Banker is telegrammed: "rail shares crash". Schigolch begs her for cash (duet). (Note: Ich brauche nämlich notwendig Geld (I need spending money)) She confides in him, and he agrees to kill the Athlete.

Police commissioner

The Marquis and Athlete argue. She tells the Athlete to sleep with Geschwitz, who will then lend Lulu money to pay him. She offers herself to Geschwitz if Geschwitz beds the Athlete in a hotel (Schigolch's) that night. Geschwitz hesitantly agrees. Lulu swaps clothes with her valet. The market panic yields antisemitism. She and Alwa run. Police and the Marquis reach the valet, who starts to laugh.

Verwandlung – Variationen (Transformation – Variations)

Geschwitz

===== Scene 2 =====
Dark, leaky London garret

The rain beats outside (barrel-organ tune, tremolo strings). Alwa and Schigolch face their ruin as Lulu tries street prostitution. They hide as she brings a meek Professor (Goll's silent double), who pays upfront and leaves.

Geschwitz brings a rolled-up canvas, Lulu's portrait. Lulu refuses it, nearly shrieking. Schigolch says it would wow clients (quartet). (Note: Ihr Körper stand auf dem Höhepunkt (Her body was at its peak)) Enraptured, Alwa nails it to the wall. Stifled and haunted, Lulu returns to the streets, defying the sickly Alwa. Geschwitz chases.

Lulu's second client, the Negro (the Painter's double), (Note: Komm nur herein, mein Schatz! Komm! (Come in, my love! Come in!)) is a self-proclaimed African prince who attacks her when she tries to arrange payment—and also Alwa, who intervened. Seeing Alwa dead, Lulu flees into the streets. Schigolch drags Alwa away and visits the pub when Geschwitz returns. Geschwitz contemplates suicide, pleading under Lulu's portrait for true love. (Note: Nein, wenn sie mich heut in meinem Blut liegen sieht (No, if she saw me lying in my blood))

Jack the Ripper

Lulu's third client, Jack the Ripper (Schön's double), sees Geschwitz's supplication. Lulu calls Geschwitz her crazy sister and asks Jack to stay the night. Jack says Geschwitz is in love. He haggles, asks for change, and then demands Lulu's money. She cannot resist. They enter her moonlit bedroom.

Geschwitz envisions studying women's-rights law in Germany. Lulu cries "No!" (Note: Nein!) repeatedly (low Tristan chord), (Note: transposed down a minor sixth) culminating in her death scream (twelve-tone sonority). (Note: Todesschrei) Geschwitz rattles the door. Bursting out, Jack stabs Geschwitz, gloats, (Note: Ich bin doch ein verdammter Glückspilz! (I am just the luckiest of men!)) and exits.

In her dying breath, Geschwitz sings to Lulu. (Note: Lulu! Mein Engel! Lass dich noch einmal sehn! Ich bin dir nah! Bleibe dir nah! In Ewigkeit! (Lulu! My Angel! Let me see you one more time! I am close! Stay close! For eternity!))

== Reception ==
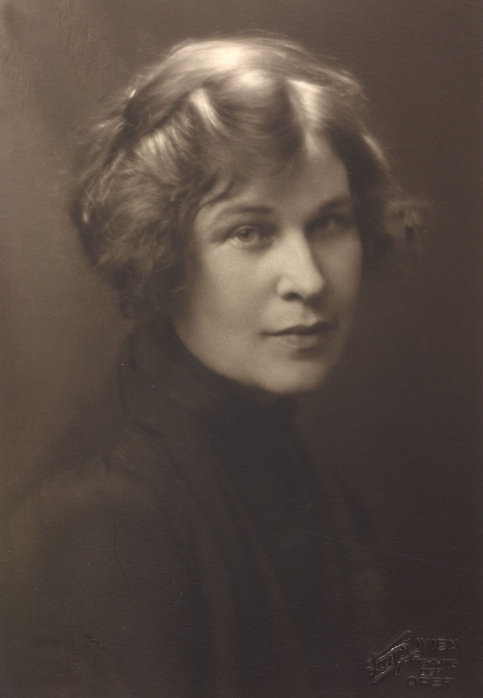
Helene Berg, 1927 (photo, Georg Fayer)

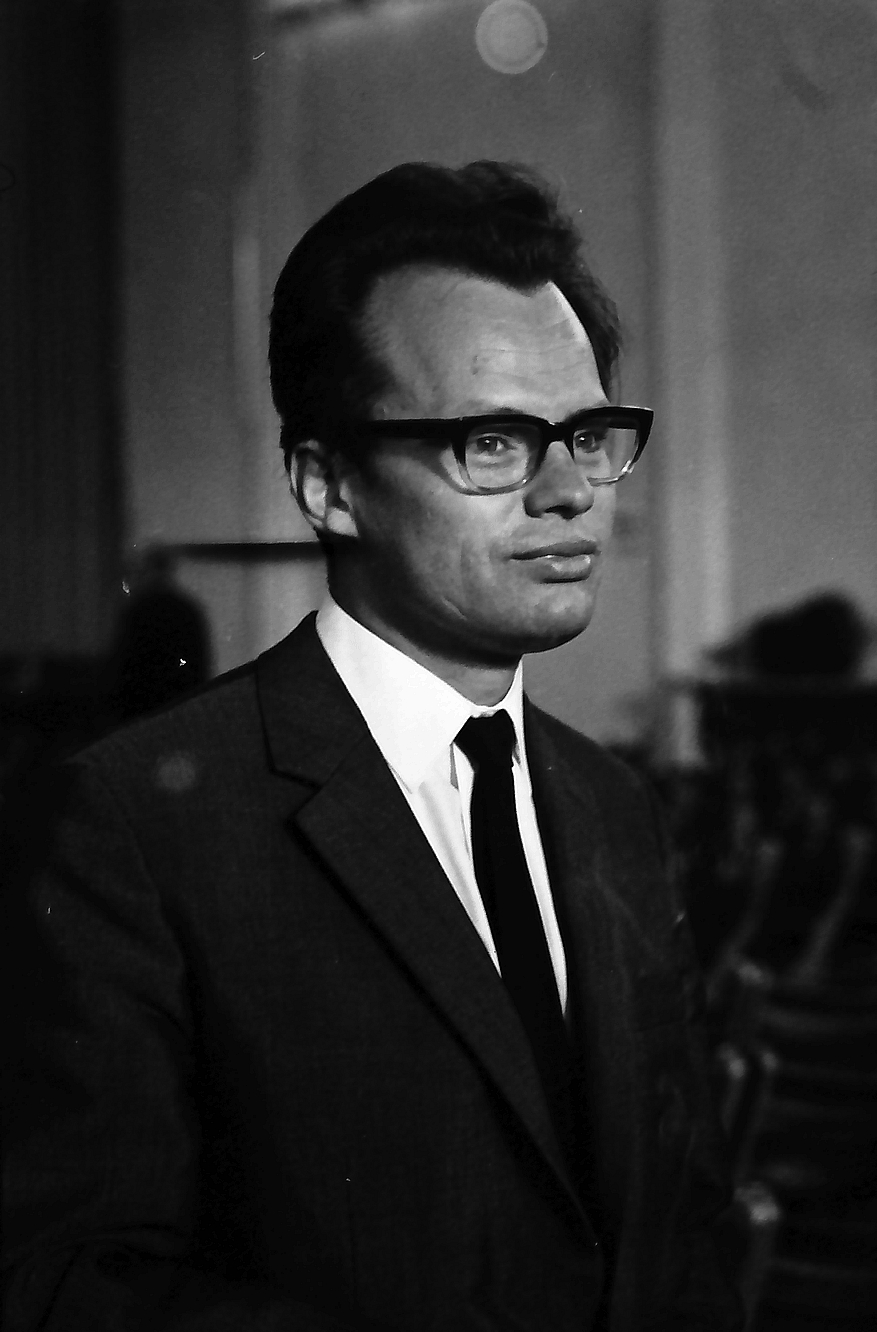
Friedrich Cerha, 1964 (photo, Willy Pragher)

Schoenberg declined to complete Lulu, and then Helene barred all completions. It has been performed in various incomplete forms, including the Zurich version or Lulu "torso", so called from the premiere of two acts and the act 3 suite excerpts there. When Helene died in 1976, Universal Edition published Friedrich Cerha's completed version, sometimes called the Paris version after its 1979 premiere. This version has often been performed since.

=== Completion disputes ===
Berg's widow Helene asked Schoenberg to finish Lulu. He had been struck by the underclass focus of Berg's operas and refused, calling the project time-consuming. Among some, Schoenberg objected to the antisemitic Journalist and Jewish Banker (act 3, scene 1). Berg had added derogatory language from antisemitic tropes to Wedekind's text, which Schoenberg refused to reinforce by finishing act 3, especially amid Nazism. Helene then barred Lulu's completion.

Journalist

Banker

Erwin Stein made a piano–vocal score of act 3. He removed antisemitic material from the vocal score and was more charitable to Berg.

Later, Cerha called Berg's additions dramatic, and composer–scholar George Perle stressed that Wedekind specified the Banker's Jewish identity. Both mentioned Kraus, who influenced Berg. Kraus polemically examined German–Jewish assimilation and journalism.

=== Incomplete forms ===
For over 40 years, acts 1–2 were staged whole, and act 3 was sometimes replaced by the Lulu Suite's act 3 excerpts. Zürich Opera premiered Lulu this way on 2 June 1937. Director Heinz Rückert shot the mid-opera film as Berg specified. The Staatsarchiv Zürich has four film stills, but Rückert's film is lost. New productions variously remake, borrow, adapt, or omit the film.

On 4 September 1949, at the Venice Biennale, La Fenice staged Lulu's Italian premiere, with Nino Sanzogno conducting. In 1953, Gustav König led Essen's municipal theater company (Note: Die Bühnen der Stadt Essen) in the German premiere on 7 March at the Grillo-Theater, starring Carla Spletter, and in the Netherlands premiere on 7 July during the Holland Festival at Amsterdam's Stadsschouwburg. The BBC broadcast the latter on 10 August. In 1957, Hamburg State Opera revived Lulu in a Günther Rennert production, led by Leopold Ludwig and starring Helga Pilarczyk, which played at the Paris Opera in 1960, London's Sadler's Wells in 1962, and La Scala in 1963.

The Santa Fe Opera's general director John Crosby tried to secure the complete version for the company's 1963 US premiere of Lulu, featuring more of the third act, with Joan Carroll (Lulu), George Shirley (Alwa), Donald Gramm (Schön), and Elaine Bonazzi (Geschwitz) led by Robert Craft.

In 1966, Anja Silja debuted as Lulu in Wieland Wagner's production at the Staatsoper Stuttgart, later filmed with Carlos Alexander as Schön. In 1967, New York's Metropolitan Opera revived Rennert's production, with Anneliese Rothenberger (Lulu), Gerhard Unger (Alwa), Toni Blankenheim (Schön), and Kerstin Meyer (Geschwitz) led by Ludwig. Electrola recorded this cast in 1968. The Metropolitan Opera revived the incomplete Lulu in April 1977, with John Dexter directing and Carole Farley as Lulu.

=== Completed version ===
Helene Berg died in 1976. In 1979, Universal Edition published Friedrich Cerha's complete version of Lulu, and the Paris Opera premiered it on 24 February at the Palais Garnier, with Teresa Stratas as Lulu, Pierre Boulez conducting, and Patrice Chéreau directing. The complete Lulu's premiere was a sensation, and its recording won that year's Gramophone Award. Santa Fe gave the complete Lulu's US premiere on 28 July, with Nancy Shade as Lulu, Barry Busse, Alwa, William Dooley, Schön, and Katherine Ciesinski, Geschwitz. The Metropolitan Opera followed in December 1980 and released a DVD. In 1981, The Royal Opera staged the complete Lulu's UK premiere, with Karan Armstrong as Lulu, Colin Davis conducting, and Götz Friedrich directing.

In 2015, the Metropolitan Opera staged and broadcast Lulu, with Marlis Petersen as Lulu and visual design by William Kentridge. The Dutch National Opera (2015), English National Opera (2016), and Teatro dell'Opera di Roma (2017) restaged this production with new casts.

=== Recordings ===
Year	Lulu, Alwa, Schön, Geschwitz	Conductor, company, version	Release
1952	Ilona Steingruber; Hans Libert; Otto Wiener; Maria Cerny	Herbert Häfner; Vienna Symphony; 2 acts (incomplete)	Columbia Masterworks Records, vinyl SL-121
1968	Anneliese Rothenberger; Gerhard Unger; Toni Blankenheim; Kerstin Meyer	Leopold Ludwig; Hamburg Staatsoper; 2 acts (incomplete)	Electrola, vinyl SMA 91711/13
1968	Evelyn Lear; Donald Grobe; Dietrich Fischer-Dieskau; Patricia Johnson	Karl Böhm; Deutsche Oper Berlin; 2 acts (incomplete)	Deutsche Grammophon, vinyl/CD
1976	Anja Silja; Josef Hopferwieser; Walter Berry; Brigitte Fassbaender	Christoph von Dohnányi; Vienna Philharmonic; 2 acts (incomplete) and suite excerpts	Decca Records, vinyl D48D 3
1979	Teresa Stratas; Kenneth Riegel; Franz Mazura; Yvonne Minton	Pierre Boulez; Paris Opera; 3 acts (Cerha)	Deutsche Grammophon, vinyl/CD; 2711 024; 0289 463 6172 6
1983	Julia Migenes; Richard Karczykowski; Theo Adam; Brigitte Fassbaender	Lorin Maazel; Vienna State Opera (live); 3 acts (Cerha)	RCA Records, CD; 74321 57734 2
1991	Patricia Wise; Peter Straka; Wolfgang Schöne; Brigitte Fassbaender	Jeffrey Tate; Orchestre National de France (live); 3 acts (Cerha)	EMI Records, CD; 5 09400 2
1996	Constance Hauman; Peter Straka; Monte Jaffe; Julia Juon	Ulf Schirmer; Danish National Symphony Orchestra; 3 acts (Cerha)	Chandos Records, CD; 9540(3)
2006	Lisa Saffer; John Graham-Hall; Robert Hayward; Susan Parry	Paul Daniel; English National Opera; 3 acts (Cerha), in English	Chandos Records, CD; 3130
2009	Agneta Eichenholz; Klaus Florian Vogt; Michael Volle; Jennifer Larmore	Antonio Pappano; The Royal Opera; 3 acts (Cerha)	Opus Arte, DVD; B003LRQ0XU
2014	Barbara Hannigan; Charles Workman; Dietrich Henschel; Natascha Petrinsky	Paul Daniel; La Monnaie; 3 acts (Cerha)	BelAir Classiques, DVD

== See also ==
- Courtesan
- Erich Engel – used double casting in combining the Lulu plays
- Otto Falckenberg – created the version of the Lulu plays that likely most influenced Berg
- Hetairikoi dialogoi
- List of sex workers in literature
- Lolita (opera)
- Madonna–whore complex
- Mignon, based on Wilhelm Meister's Apprenticeship
- Friedrich Nietzsche's accounts of taming and recurrence
- Ragionamenti
- Street scenes (Ernst Kirchner artworks)
- Theosophical mysticism
- Vaudeville
- Otto Weininger
