= Sailing at the 1936 Summer Olympics – Star =

Star at the Games of the XI Olympiad
- Star
- Venue: Firth of Kiel
- Dates: 4–12 August
- Competitors: 24 from 12 nations
- Teams: 12

Medalists
1st place, gold medalist(s)		Peter Bischoff; Hans-Joachim Weise	Germany
2nd place, silver medalist(s)		Arvid Laurin; Uno Wallentin	Sweden
3rd place, bronze medalist(s)		Bob Maas Willem de Vries Lentsch	Netherlands

The Star was a sailing event on the Sailing at the 1936 Summer Olympics program in Firth of Kiel. Seven races were scheduled. 24 sailors, on 12 boats, from 12 nations competed.

== Results ==
Rank	Helmsman (Country)	Crew	Yachtname	Sailnumber	Race I		Race II		Race III		Race IV		Race V		Race VI		Race VII		Total Points
Rank	Helmsman (Country)	Crew	Yachtname	Sailnumber	Rank	Points	Rank	Points	Rank	Points	Rank	Points	Rank	Points	Rank	Points	Rank	Points	Total Points
1st place, gold medalist(s)	Peter Bischoff (GER)	Hans-Joachim Weise	Wannsee	1287	1	12	4	9	1	12	1	12	2	11	1	12	1	12	80
2nd place, silver medalist(s)	Arvid Laurin (SWE)	Uno Wallentin	Sunshine	915	2	11	1	12	3	10	2	11	12	1	3	10	4	9	64
3rd place, bronze medalist(s)	Bob Maas (NED)	Willem de Vries Lentsch	BEM II	1294	DNF	0	2	11	4	9	3	10	1	12	2	11	3	10	63
4	Keith Grogono (GBR)	William Welply	Paka	1074	4	9	3	10	2	11	7	6	8	5	5	8	6	7	56
5	William Glenn Waterhouse (USA)	Woodbridge Metcalf	Three Star Too	948	3	10	5	8	8	5	9	4	3	10	4	9	8	5	51
6	Oivind Christensen (NOR)	Sigurd Herbern	KNS	1292	5	8	10	3	7	6	6	7	4	9	6	7	9	4	44
7	Jean-Jacques Herbulot (FRA)	Pierre de Montaut	Fada	1304	3	10	DSQ	0	9	4	4	9	5	8	7	6	2	11	48
8	Harun Ülman (TUR)	Behzat Baydar	Marmara	1190	7	6	6	7	6	7	12	1	6	7	11	2	5	8	38
9	Riccardo De Sangro Fondi (ITA)	Federico De Luca	Pegaso	990	8	5	7	6	5	8	11	2	9	4	10	3	7	6	34
10	Joaquim Mascarenhas de Fiuza (POR)	Antonio Guedes de Heredia	Vicking	1172	6	7	DSQ	0	DNF	0	5	8	7	6	8	5	11	2	28
11	Minoru Takarabe (JPN)	Takuo Mitsui	Myojo	1079	9	4	8	5	DNF	0	10	3	11	2	9	4	12	1	19
12	Victor Godts (BEL)	Albert Vos	Freddy	870	11	2	9	4	DNF	0	8	5	10	3	12	1	10	3	18

DNF = Did Not Finish, DNS= Did Not Start, DSQ = Disqualified, SO = Sailed over
= Male, = Female

=== Daily standings ===
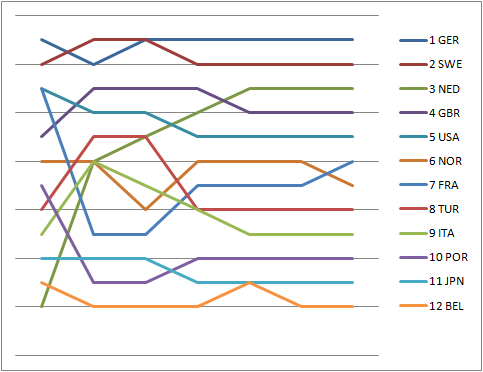
Graph showing the daily standings in the Star during the 1936 Summer Olympics

== Conditions at the Outer Course ==
All starts were scheduled for 10:30.
The position of the outercourse was in front of Schilksee where in 1972 the new Olympic center was used. So in 1936 a long distance sailing/towing to the racing area from the old Olympic harbor.

Date	Race	Sky	Wind direction	Wind speed (m/s)	Actual starting time	Remark
4 August 1936	I	Overcast, Occasional rain	SW	12	12:05	Postponement storm at the outer bay > 16 m/s
5 August 1936	II	Sunshine, Later overcast and rain	WSW	3-4	10:30	
6 August 1936	III	Sunny	WSW	5-6	10:30	
7 August 1936	IV	Slightly overcast	NE	2	10:40	Postponement due to calm
8 August 1936	V	Foggy later slightly overcast	NE	2-3	11:45	Postponement due to fog
9 August 1936	VI	Calm	ENE	2-3	11:50	Postponement due to calm
10 August 1936	VII	Fine	SE	2-3	10:30	
