= Erich Schumacher =

German theatre director

Erich Schumacher (24 December 1908 – 5 September 1986) was a German theatre director.

== Career ==
Schumacher was born in Kenzingen. In the period of National Socialism Schumacher took over the direction of the Pfalztheater in Kaiserslautern at the age of 29 (1938), he was Germany's youngest artistic director. From 1940 until 1945, he was director of the Städtische Bühnen Mönchengladbach-Rheydt. From 1949 until 1958, he was general director of the Theater Krefeld und Mönchengladbach.

From 1958 to 1974, Schumacher held the same position at the Grillo-Theater. Together with his dramaturge Ilka Boll, he set artistic accents that shaped the theatre in Essen until the 1980s. He worked for many years with the general music director Gustav König as well as the directors Paul Hager, Claus Leininger and the choreographer Boris Pilato.

His time in Essen is also linked to the names of Jean Genet, Paul Claudel, Rolf Hochhuth and Peter Weiss, some of whose pieces were even premiered in Essen.

Schumacher died in Essen at the age of 77.
