= Claus Leininger =

German stage director

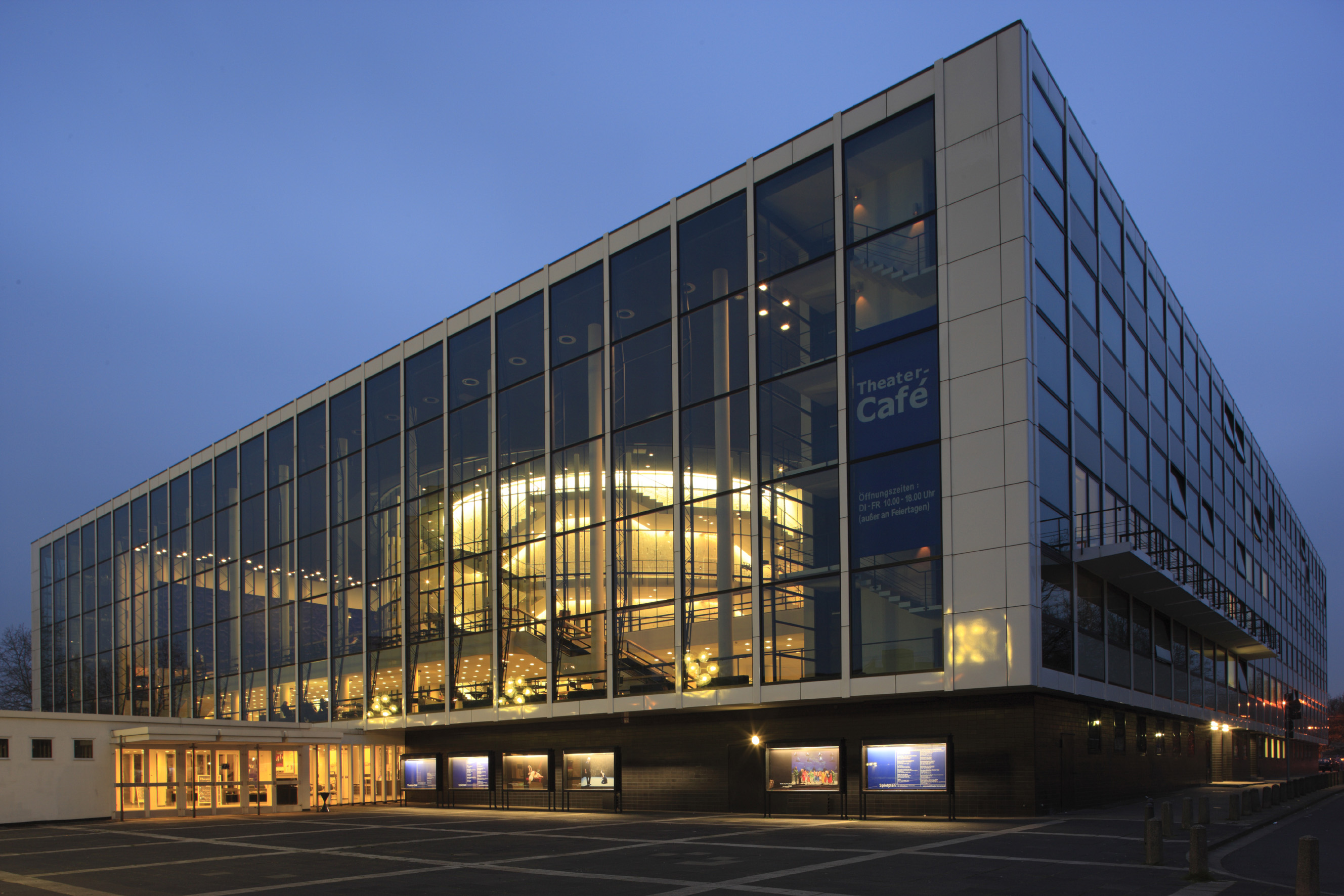
- Musiktheater im Revier, called the Ruhr-Scala when Leininger was General Manager
- Born: 17 January 1931; Mannheim, Germany
- Died: 22 February 2005 (aged 74); Wiesbaden, Germany
- Occupations: Theatre director; Opera director; Theatre general manager
- Organizations: Musiktheater im Revier; Hessisches Staatstheater Wiesbaden

Claus Leininger (17 January 1931 – 22 February 2005) was a German stage director in theatre and opera, and an intendant (general manager). He shaped the artistic profile of the Musiktheater im Revier in Gelsenkirchen, nicknamed the Ruhr-Scala during his tenure, and the Hessisches Staatstheater Wiesbaden.

Born in Mannheim, Leininger studied acting and stage directing from 1950 to 1952. He was then engaged at the Nationaltheater Mannheim as an actor and Regieassistent (assistant director). He worked at the Deutsches Theater Göttingen from 1956, then at the Theater Freiburg until 1967. He also was involved in a 1970 production of Wolfgang Borchert's Draußen vor der Tür for television, alongside Helmut Rost (TV direction), Klaus Abramowsky, Jens-Uwe Pape, and others (music by Alfons Nowacki. Production: Städtische Bühnen Essen, ZDF).

From 1967 to 1974, he was Oberspielleiter des Schauspiels, leading the play section of the Städtische Bühnen Essen, with Erich Schumacher as director. He held the same position at the Nationaltheater Mannheim until 1977. He was appointed Generalintendant (General Manager) of the Musiktheater im Revier in Gelsenkirchen on the recommendation of conductor Uwe Mund and held the post until 1986. At the beginning of his tenure, he called the singer Carla Henius to form and direct the musik-theater-werkstatt (Music Theatre Workshop), which was devoted to the presentation of new operas. Leininger's time at the Musiktheater im Revier was described as an era and as the period of the company's highest artistic accomplishment. He built ensembles at both houses, opera and play, finding young talents who often moved on in their careers. He commissioned young stage directors, such as Järvefeldt, Jaroslav Chundela, Dietrich Hilsdorf, Göran Järvefelt and Christian Pöppelreiter, and set designers such as Johannes Leiacker, and focused on teamwork. He won Bernd Schindowski for a ballet that was also directed at children and young people. Occasionally, notable singers were invited as guests to make performances more attractive, including Grace Bumbry, Helen Donath, Mirella Freni, Johanna Meier, Birgit Nilsson, Katia Ricciarelli, Leonie Rysanek, Theo Adam, Giacomo Aragall, Peter Dvorský, Manfred Jung, Kurt Moll, Karl Ridderbusch, and Ingvar Wixell. Alluding to the noted Italian opera house La Scala, the theater was nicknamed the Ruhr-Scala during Leininger's tenure, reflecting the upgrading of cultural offerings in what was essentially an industrial region along the Ruhr river.

When Leininger moved to the Hessisches Staatstheater Wiesbaden as Generalintendant in 1986, Henius followed and directed an institution for new operas there. He was Generalintendant until 1994.
