= Street Scene =

A street scene is a model for theatre proposed by Bertolt Brecht.

Street Scene may refer to:

- Street Scene (play), 1929, by Elmer Rice
- Street Scene (film), 1931, directed by King Vidor, based on Rice's play
- Street Scene (opera), 1947, by Kurt Weill, based on Rice's play
- Street Scene (San Diego music festival)
- Street Scenes 1970, a documentary directed by Martin Scorsese
- Street scenes (Ernst Kirchner artworks), artworks by Ernst Kirchner
- Street photography
