= Albert Vos =

Belgian sailor

Personal information
- Nationality: Belgian
- Born: 25 November 1886
- Died: 21 April 1949 (aged 62)

Sailing career
- Sport: Sailing
- Club: Royal Yacht Club van België
- Class: Star

Albert Vos (25 November 1886 – 21 April 1949) was a Belgian sailor. He and Victor Godts competed for Belgium at the 1936 Summer Olympics in the Star event.
