= Sigurd Herbern =

Norwegian sailor (1900–1987)

Personal information
- Full name: Sigurd Frithjof Herbern
- Nationality: Norwegian
- Born: 22 November 1900 Oslo, Norway
- Died: 18 January 1987 (aged 86) Oslo, Norway

Sport
- Sport: Sailing

Sigurd Frithjof Herbern (22 November 1900 – 18 January 1987) was a Norwegian sailor. He competed, with Øivind Christensen as helm, in the Star event at the 1936 Summer Olympics.

From 1942 to 1944, Herbern was responsible for 'For konge og fedreland' (tr. "For King and Fatherland"), one of the illegal newspapers published during the German occupation of Norway during World War II. He hosted a printing press in a summerhouse on the island of Killingen in the Oslo Fjord. For his pains, he was eventually arrested, together with a number of distributors, by the Gestapo in 1944.

He was also known for yacht building and for a number of yacht designs. The Norwegian Maritime Museum has a list of Hebern's designs. In the late 1940s Herbern designed the 'Killing' sailboat, on the island of Killingen (hence the name). The design is a 5.25m-long one-design keelboat. He also designed the Junker 24.
