= Hans-Joachim Weise =

German sailor

Medal record

Men's sailing

Representing Germany

Olympic Games
Gold medal – first place	1936 Berlin	Star class

Hans-Joachim Weise (15 November 1912 – 24 February 1991) was a German competitive sailor and Olympic champion. He won a gold medal in the Star class at the 1936 Summer Olympics in Berlin, together with Peter Bischoff.
