= Peter Bischoff =

German sailor (1904–1976)

Medal record

Men's sailing

Representing Germany

Olympic Games
Gold medal – first place	1936 Berlin	Star class

Peter Bischoff (24 March 1904 – 1 July 1976) was a German competitive sailor and Olympic champion. He won a gold medal in the Star class at the 1936 Summer Olympics in Berlin, together with Hans-Joachim Weise. In 1937 he married the German soprano Carla Spletter.
