= For konge og fedreland =

Norwegian partisan newspaper during World War II

For konge og fedreland (tr. "For King and Fatherland") was one of the underground newspapers published during the German occupation of Norway during World War II.

For konge og fedreland was started in the autumn of 1941, right after the occupiers had confiscated all radios. It was first and foremost a radio newspaper, which carried the news from London broadcasts, but the newspaper also brought other material.

It was started by Henrik Weber. The first year the operation was modest, but in 1942 the work was stepped up sharply. Sigurd Fr. Herbern now had the main responsibility for the newspaper. Stig Bille, Gunnar Eide, Thorleif Holth, Erling Moe and Knut Westlund, among others, participated. At times, Gregers Gram from the Norwegian Independent Company 1 also participated in the work with the newspaper, when he was carrying out missions in the country. Gram was later shot by the Germans during a mission in Norway.

For konge og fedreland was provided with a relatively "safe" place of production, when Herbern had furnished a secret room in his summer house on the island of Killingen in Lysakerfjorden outside Bygdøy. The Germans once raided the site in search of a secret transmitter, without uncovering the newspaper's hiding place.

In the early summer of 1944, however, the Gestapo closed down the paper, and Herbern and several distributors were arrested.

One source shows, in addition to two editions of the paper of unknown date, five editions of the paper from November 1942, 14 from 1943, and 20 from 1944.
