= Victor Godts =

Belgian sailor

Personal information
- Full name: Victor Josephus Godts
- Nationality: Belgian
- Born: 17 March 1893; Antwerp, Belgium
- Died: unknown

Sailing career
- Class: Star
- Club: Royal Yacht Club van België

Victor Josephus Godts (born 17 March 1893, date of death unknown) was a Belgian sailor. He and Albert Vos competed for Belgium at the 1936 Summer Olympics in the Star event.
