= Gustav König =

German conductor (1910–2005)

Gustav König (12 August 1910 – 5 February 2005) was a German conductor and music director in Essen.

== Life ==
König was born at Schwabach in Bavaria in 1910 and educated at the local Gymnasium (Grammar school) and conservatory in his hometown. He went on to study at the Hochschule für Musik und Theater München.

His conducting career began in 1932–1933 as opera conductor and concert conductor in Osnabrück and then Szczecin (1934–1935), Berlin at the Neues Schauspielhaus and Theater des Westens (1936–1937), and Aachen (1941–1942) as Kapellmeister and Deputy General Music Director to Herbert von Karajan. From 1943 to 1944 he was musical director of the Opera in Essen. from the 1951/52 season he was appointed general music director, working with Karl Bauer, Erich Schumacher and Jürgen Dieter Waidelich. König retired in 1975, after being conductor of the Essener Philharmoniker since 1943. He died in Essen in 2005 at the age of 94.

== Legacy ==
König was known for mounting original or German premieres of works of modernity, including Frank Martin's Le Vin herbé (1948), Alban Berg's Lulu (1953), Dallapiccola's Il prigioniero (1954) and Hermann Reutter's Die Brücke von San Luis Rey.

== Bibliography ==
- Franz Feldens: 75 Jahre Städtische Bühnen Essen Geschichte des Essener Theaters 1892–1967. Rheinisch-Westfälische Verlagsgesellschaft, 1967.
- Helga Mohaupt, Rudolf Majer-Finkes: Das Grillo-Theater: Geschichte eines Essener Theaterbaus. 1892–1990; mit Dokumentation von Rudolf Majer-Finkes; Bonn: Bouvier, 1990, ISBN 3-416-80661-1
- Jürgen Dieter Waidelich: Essen spielt Theater: 1000 und einhundert Jahre; zum 100. Geburtstag des Grillo-Theaters. Bd. 1 (1992) und Bd. 2 (1994), ECON-Verlag, ISBN 3-430-19454-7
