= Takuo Mitsui =

Japanese sailor

Personal information
- Nationality: Japanese
- Born: 17 November 1909

Sport
- Sport: Sailing

Takuo Mitsui (三井 卓雄, Mitsui Takuo, born 17 November 1909, date of death unknown) was a Japanese sailor. He competed in the Star event at the 1936 Summer Olympics.
