= Riccardo De Sangro Fondi =

Italian sailor

Personal information
- Nationality: Italian
- Born: 22 December 1879; Naples, Italy
- Died: 11 June 1968 (aged 88); Naples, Italy

Sport
- Sport: Sailing

Riccardo De Sangro Fondi (22 December 1879 – 11 June 1968) was an Italian sailor. He competed in the Star event at the 1936 Summer Olympics.
