= William Welply =

British sailor

Personal information
- Nationality: British
- Born: 25 December 1912; West Ham, England
- Died: 24 June 1970 (aged 57); Marylebone, England

Sport
- Sport: Sailing

William Welply (25 December 1912 – 24 June 1970) was a British sailor. He competed in the Star event at the 1936 Summer Olympics.
