= Willem de Vries Lentsch =

Dutch sailor (1886–1980)

Personal information
- Full name: Willem de Vries Lentsch
- Nationality: Dutch
- Born: 10 September 1886 Nieuwendam, North Holland, Netherlands
- Died: 6 March 1980 (aged 93) Amsterdam, Netherlands

Sailing career
- Sport: Sailing
- Class(es): 12' Dinghy, Star
Medal record
Sailing
Representing Netherlands
Olympic Games
Bronze medal – third place	1936 Berlin	Star
- Updated on 2014-01-22

Willem de Vries Lentsch (10 September 1886 – 6 March 1980) was a sailor from the Netherlands, who represented his native country at the 1928 Summer Olympics in Amsterdam in the 12' Dinghy. In 1936, with Bob Maas as helmsmen, De Vries Lentsch took part in the Dutch Star BEM II and took the Bronze.

Willem de Vries Lentsch is the younger brother of Gerard de Vries Lentsch and the father of Wim de Vries Lentsch.

== Sources ==
- "Willem de Vries Lentsch Bio, Stats, and Results". Olympic Sports. Sports-Reference.com. Archived from the original on 18 April 2020.
- "Zeilen, een bij uitstek Nederlandsche sport. De Olympische wedstrijden ditmaal zeer goed bezet. — Wat zal de wind doen ?" (in Dutch) (Morning ed.). Het volk : dagblad voor de arbeiderspartĳ. 2 August 1928.
- "The Ninth Olympiad Amsterdam 1928:Officiel Report" (PDF). Amsterdam: The Netherlands Olympic Committee. 1928. Archived from the original (PDF) on 8 April 2008.
- "Na de Olympische Spelen te Berlijn. Ons land behoort tot de sterkste Sport-naties der wereld" (in Dutch) (Dag ed.). De Graafschap-bode. 19 August 1936.
- "The XITH Olympic Games Berlin, 1936: Officiel Report, Volume I" (PDF). Berlin: the Organisationskomitee für die XI. Olympiade Berlin 1936 e. V. 1936. Archived from the original (PDF) on 9 July 2007.
- "The XITH Olympic Games Berlin, 1936: Officiel Report, Volume II" (PDF). Berlin: the Organisationskomitee für die XI. Olympiade Berlin 1936 e. V. 1936. Archived from the original (PDF) on 9 July 2007.
