= Toni Blankenheim =

German operatic baritone

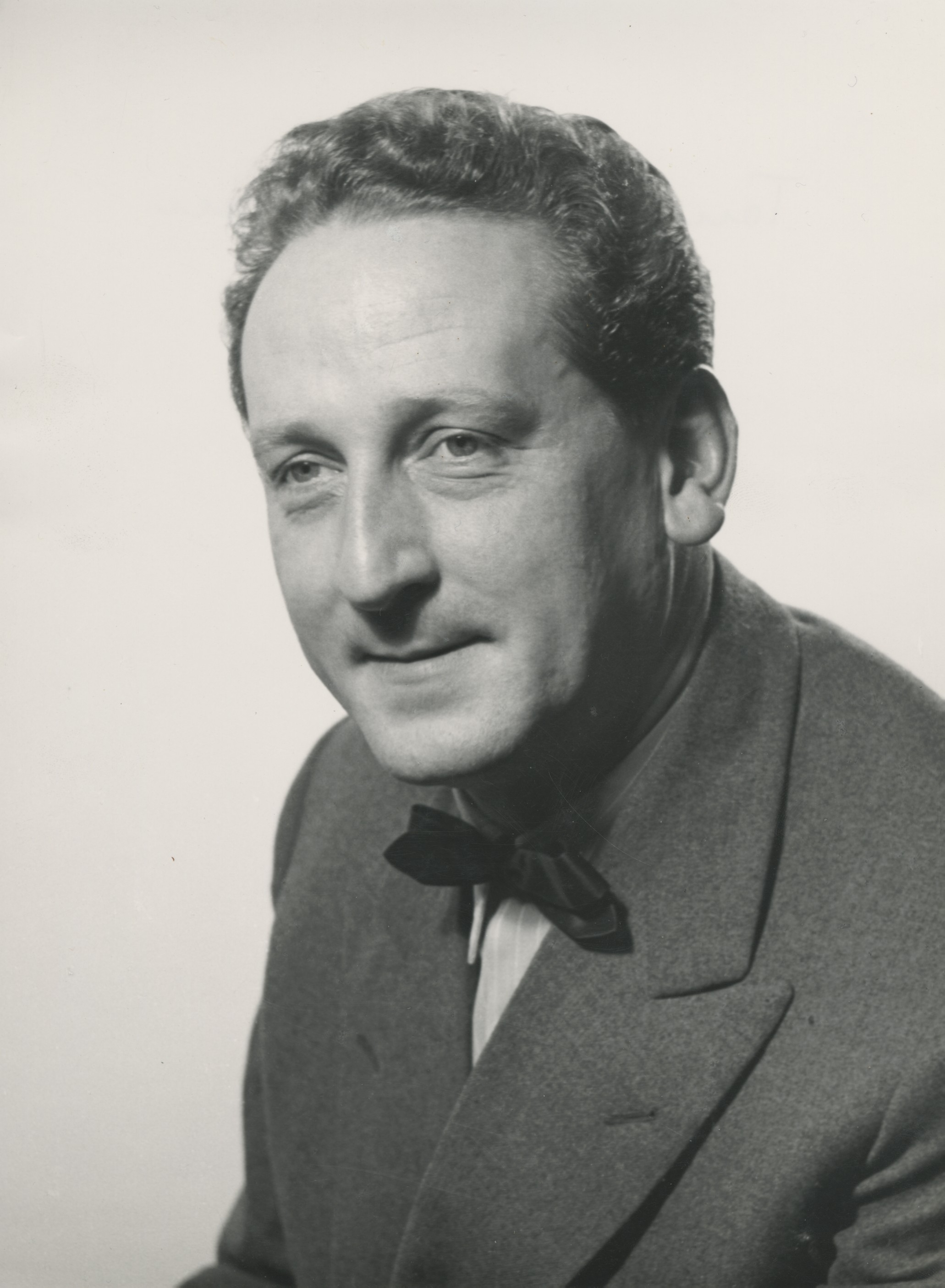
Blankenheim in the 1950s

Toni Blankenheim (12 December 1921 – 11 December 2012) was a German operatic baritone. He notably sang major roles in the operas of Alban Berg: the title role of Wozzeck, produced for television in 1970 (later issued on DVD), and the role of Schigolch in the 1981 recording of Lulu which won a Grammy Award for Best Opera Recording. He is also on record singing the role of Alberich at Bayreuth. His memorable Beckmesser in Wagner's Die Meistersinger von Nürnberg with the Hamburg State Opera has been preserved and is available on DVD. This performance is evidence of Blankenheim's charismatic stage presence and acting gifts.

== Sources ==
- Cummings, David (ed.), "Blankenheim, Toni", International Who's Who in Classical Music, Routledge, 2003. p. 77. ISBN 1-85743-174-X
