= Keith Grogono =

British sailor

Personal information
- Nationality: British
- Born: 4 November 1912; Stratford, England
- Died: 22 March 1999 (aged 86); Truro, England

Sport
- Sport: Sailing

Keith Grogono (4 November 1912 – 22 March 1999) was a British sailor. He competed in the Star event at the 1936 Summer Olympics.
