= Harun Ülman =

Turkish sailor

Personal information
- Nationality: Turkish
- Born: 11 July 1900
- Died: 26 January 1977 (aged 76); Istanbul, Turkey

Sport
- Sport: Sailing

Harun Ülman (11 July 1900 – 26 January 1977) was a Turkish sailor. He competed in the Star event at the 1936 Summer Olympics.

He later was a naval architect.
