= Behzat Baydar =

Turkish sailor

Personal information
- Nationality: Turkish
- Born: 8 March 1901; Istanbul, Turkey

Sport
- Sport: Sailing

Behzat Baydar (born 8 March 1901, 22 July 1993) was a Turkish sailor. He competed in the Star event at the 1936 Summer Olympics.
