= Uno Wallentin =

Swedish sailor

Olympic medal record

Sailing
Silver medal – second place	1936 Berlin	Star class

Uno Wallentin (April 15, 1905 – October 8, 1954) was a Swedish sailor who competed in the 1936 Summer Olympics. In 1936 he was a crew member of the Swedish boat Sunshine which won the silver medal in the Star class.
