= Street scenes (Ernst Kirchner artworks) =

Painting series by Ernst Ludwig Kirchner

The street scenes are a series of works by the German artist Ernst Ludwig Kirchner made between 1913 and 1915. The cycle is regarded as one of the most important works of German expressionism. It consists of 11 paintings, 32 pages from sketchbooks, 15 ink brush drawings, 17 pastel and chalk drawings, 14 woodcuts, 14 etchings and 8 lithographs. The series deals with the Berlin of the early 20th century and its development into a metropolis. The works frequently depict "Koketten" (prostitutes), who serve as a metaphor for the hectic pace and sensuality of the growing city.

== Paintings ==
The paintings are the central part of the work of art. The first painting is "Five women on the street". The dynamic in the composition increased during the period of origin. Style elements of futurism but also elements of Mannerism can also be found. The paintings were mostly finished in 1914. Some of them were finished in 1915 and others in the 1920s.

Painting	Title and additional information	Provenance
	Five Women on the Street (Fünf Frauen auf der Straße) 1913, oil on canvas, 126 × 90 cm The first painting of the cycle, shows five prostitutes standing on the street.	Museum Ludwig, Cologne It was bought by the Folkwang Museum in Essen in 1926, was confiscated on 6 July 1937 in the course of the "Degenerated Art" program. It was shown from November 1937 in the abusive exhibition of the same name. After that it was stored in the Schönhausen Palace as an "internationally sellable" work of art. In March 1940 it arrived at Ferdinand Möller's gallery in Berlin. In 1947 it came to Günther Franke's gallery in Munich. There it was sold to the art collector Josef Haubrich who donated it to the Wallraf-Richartz Museum in Cologne. In 1976 it was transferred to the Museum Ludwig.
	Berlin street scene (Berliner Straßenszene) 1913/1914, oil on canvas, 121 × 95 cm	Neue Galerie New York The painting gained public attention during the dispute over the restitution in 2006. It had belonged to the Jewish art collector Alfred Hess until his death. In 1936 the painting was transferred by his widow Tekla Hess to the art association cologne. There it was sold to the art collector Carl Hagemann under unclear circumstances. The heirs of Hagemann gave the painting to Ernst Holzinger in 1948. In 1980 the widow of Holzinger sold the painting to the city of Berlin, which exhibited it in the Brücke Museum. In 2006 the city of Berlin returned the painting in accordance the "Washington declaration" to the heirs of Hess. This declaration said that art that was taken from Jewish families during the Nazi era should be returned to their heirs. However this declaration is not legally binding. In the same year the painting was sold at the auction house Christie's for 30 million Euros. The new owner is the Neue Galerie in New York.
	Street, Berlin (Die Straße) 1913, oil on canvas, 120,6 × 91,1 cm	Museum of Modern Art, New York The painting was bought in 1920 by the Berlin National gallery and exhibited in the Kronprinzenpalais. It was confiscated in 1937 in the course of the "degenerated art" program by the Nazis. It was stored in the Schönhausen castle from 1938 onwards. In February 1939 it was sold by the art dealer Karl Buchholz to the Museum of Modern Art in New York.
	Street Scene (Straßenszene) 1913, oil on canvas, 70 × 51 cm	Private collection
	Streetscene (Straßenszene) 1914/1922, oil on canvas, 70 × 48 cm	Private collection, Switzerland
	Street with Red Streetwalker (Straßenszene mit roter Kokotte) 1914/1925, oil on canvas, 120 × 90 cm	Thyssen-Bornemisza Museum, Madrid
	Friedrichstraße Berlin 1914, oil on canvas, 125 × 91 cm	Staatsgalerie, Stuttgart
	Leipziger Straße with Electric Tram (Leipziger Straße mit elektrischer Bahn) 1914, oil on canvas, 69,5 × 79 cm	Museum Folkwang, Essen
	Two women on the Street (Zwei Frauen auf der Straße) 1914, oil on canvas, 120,5 × 91 cm	Kunstsammlung Nordrhein-Westfalen, Düsseldorf
	Potsdamer Platz, Berlin 1914, oil on canvas, 200 × 150 cm	Neue Nationalgalerie, Berlin
	Women on the Street (Frauen auf der Straße) 1914, oil on canvas, 126 × 90 cm	Von der Heydt-Museum, Wuppertal

== Graphics ==
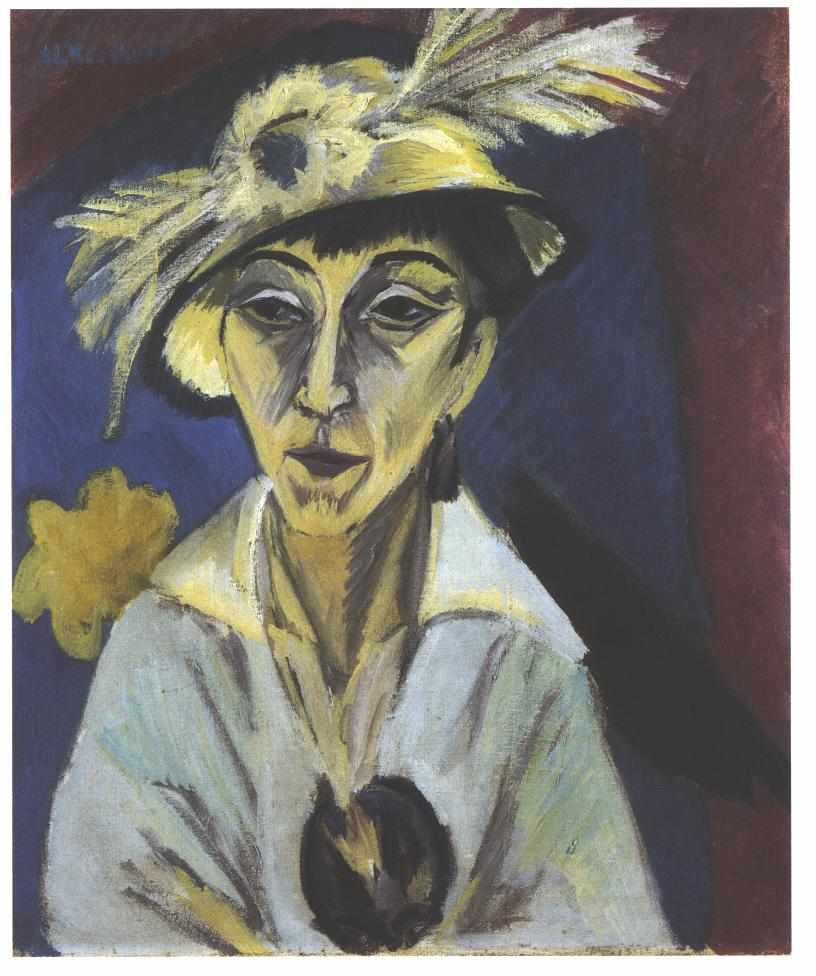

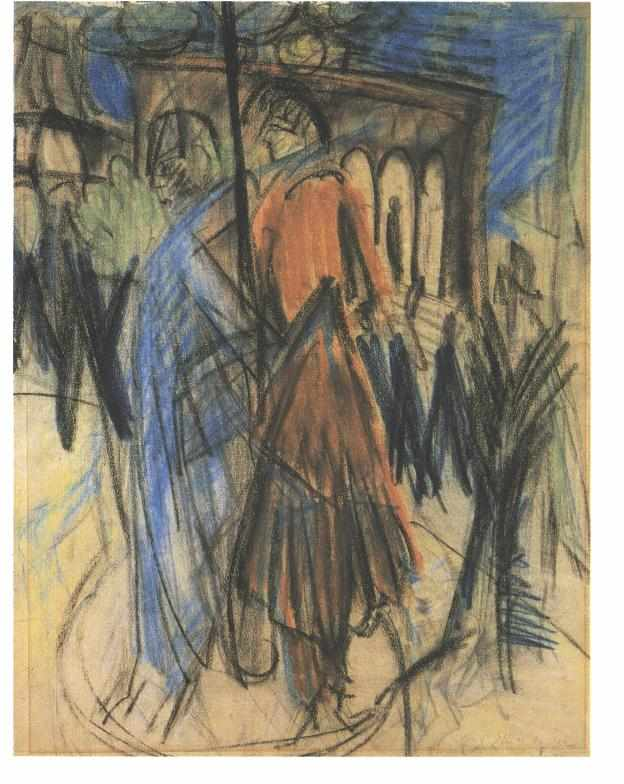

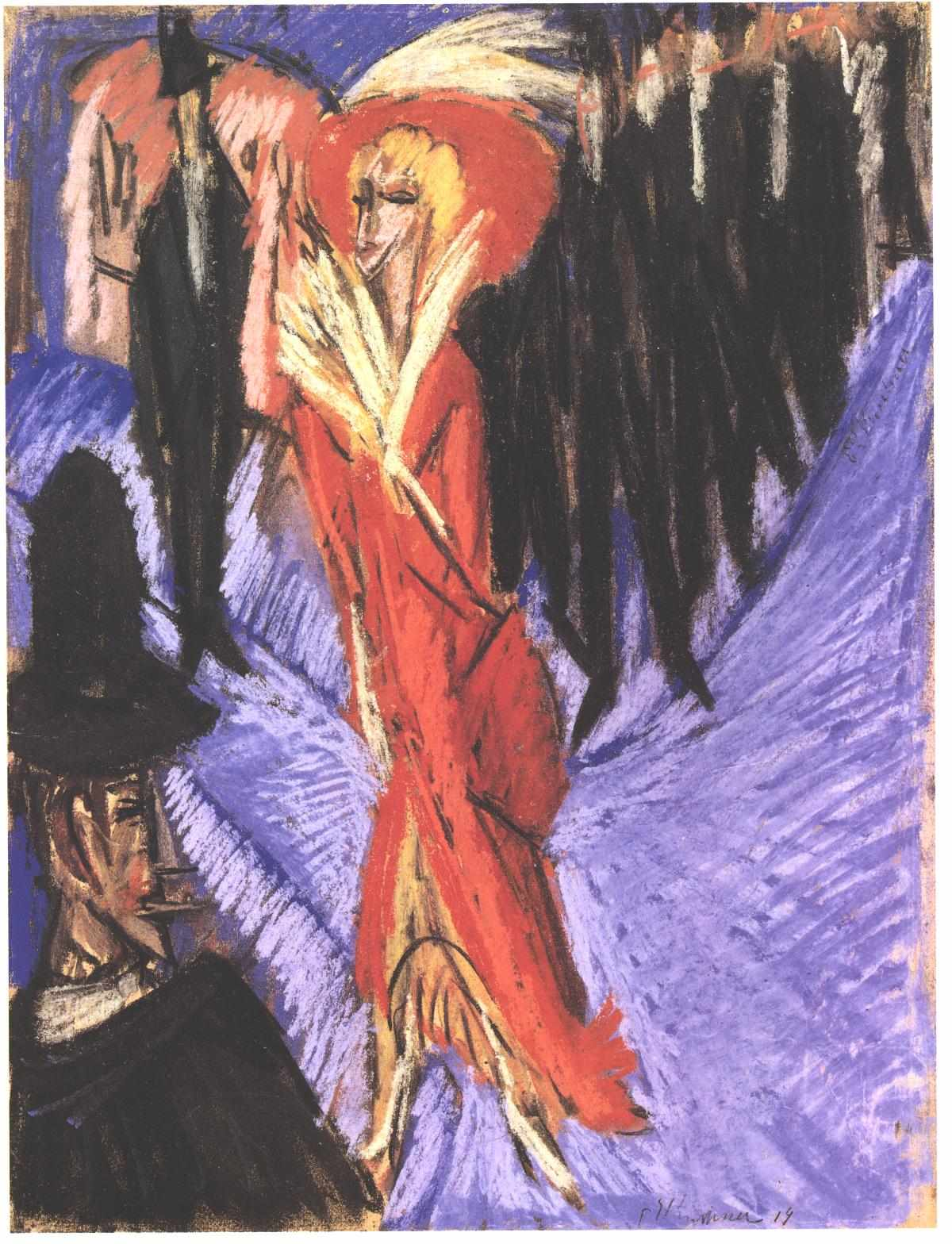

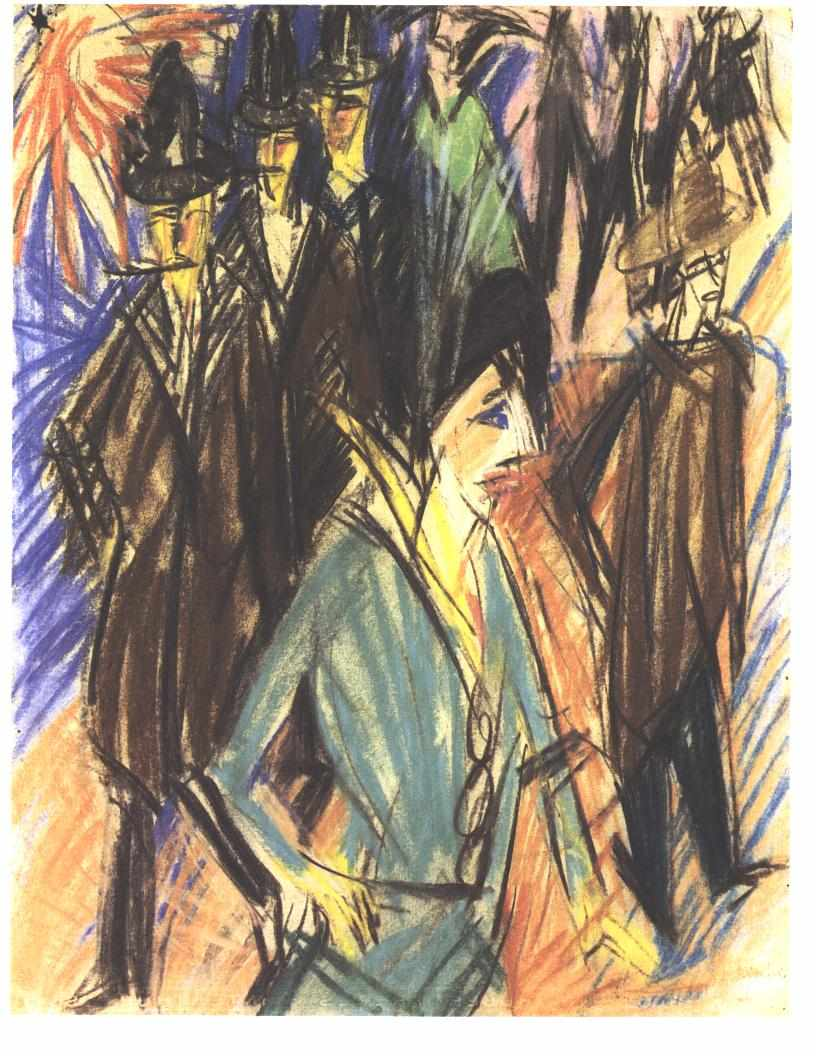

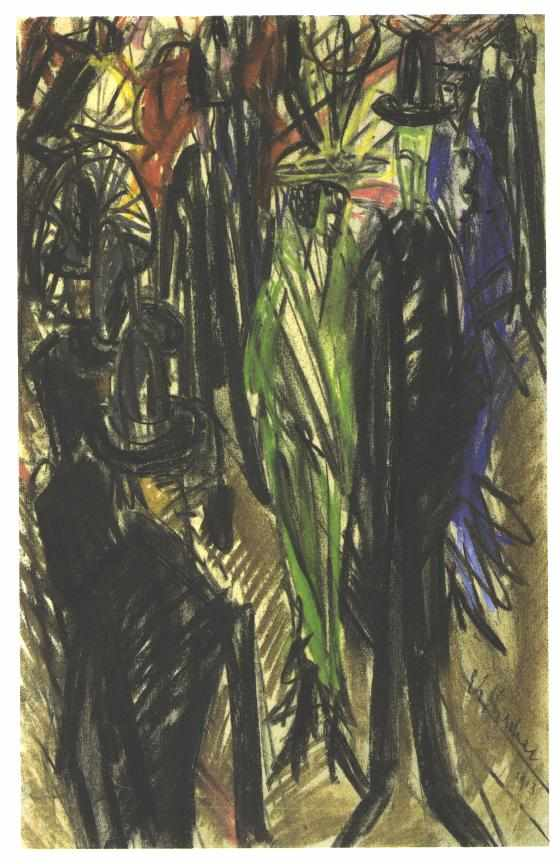

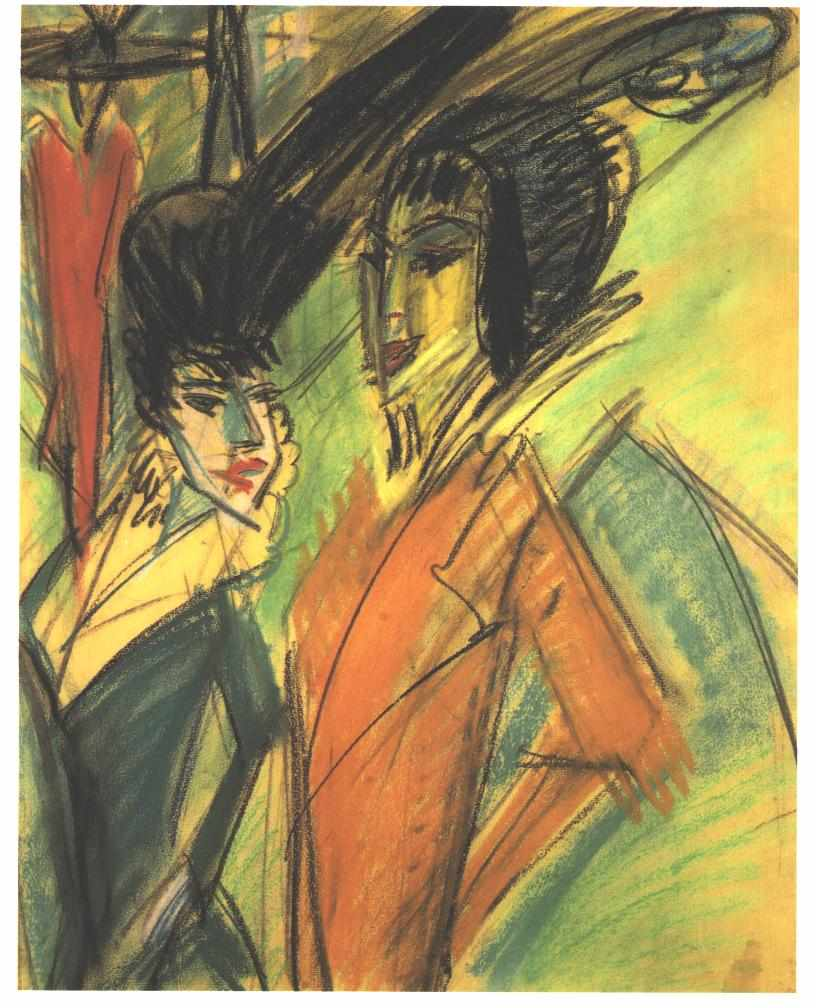

== Literature ==
- Donald E. Gordon: Ernst Ludwig Kirchner. Kritisches Werkverzeichnis, München 1968
- Magdalene M. Moeller: Ernst Ludwig Kirchner. Die Straßenszenen 1913-1915. Hirmer Verlag, München 1993, ISBN 3-7774-6190-3
- Ernst Ludwig Kirchner: Briefwechsel : 1910 - 1935. 1938, Belser Verlag, Stuttgart Zürich, 1990
- Ausstellungskatalog Ernst Ludwig Kirchner 1880–1938, Nationalgalerie Berlin, Haus der Kunst München, Museum Ludwig in der Kunsthalle Köln, Kunsthaus Zürich, 1979/1980
