= Grillo-Theater =

Theatre in Essen, Germany, used by the municipal drama company

Coordinates: 51°27′17″N 7°00′42″E

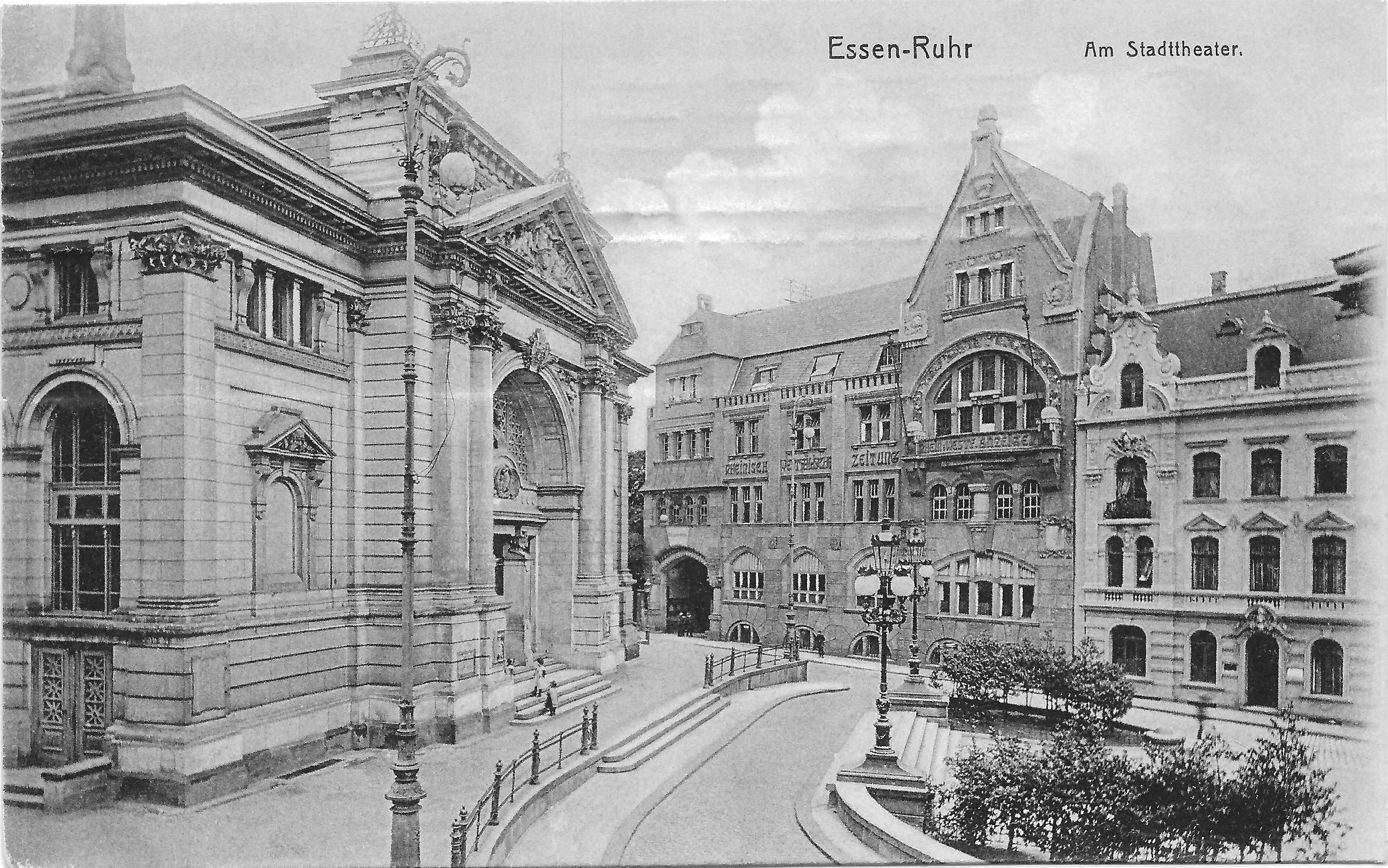
Grillo-Theater, c. 1910

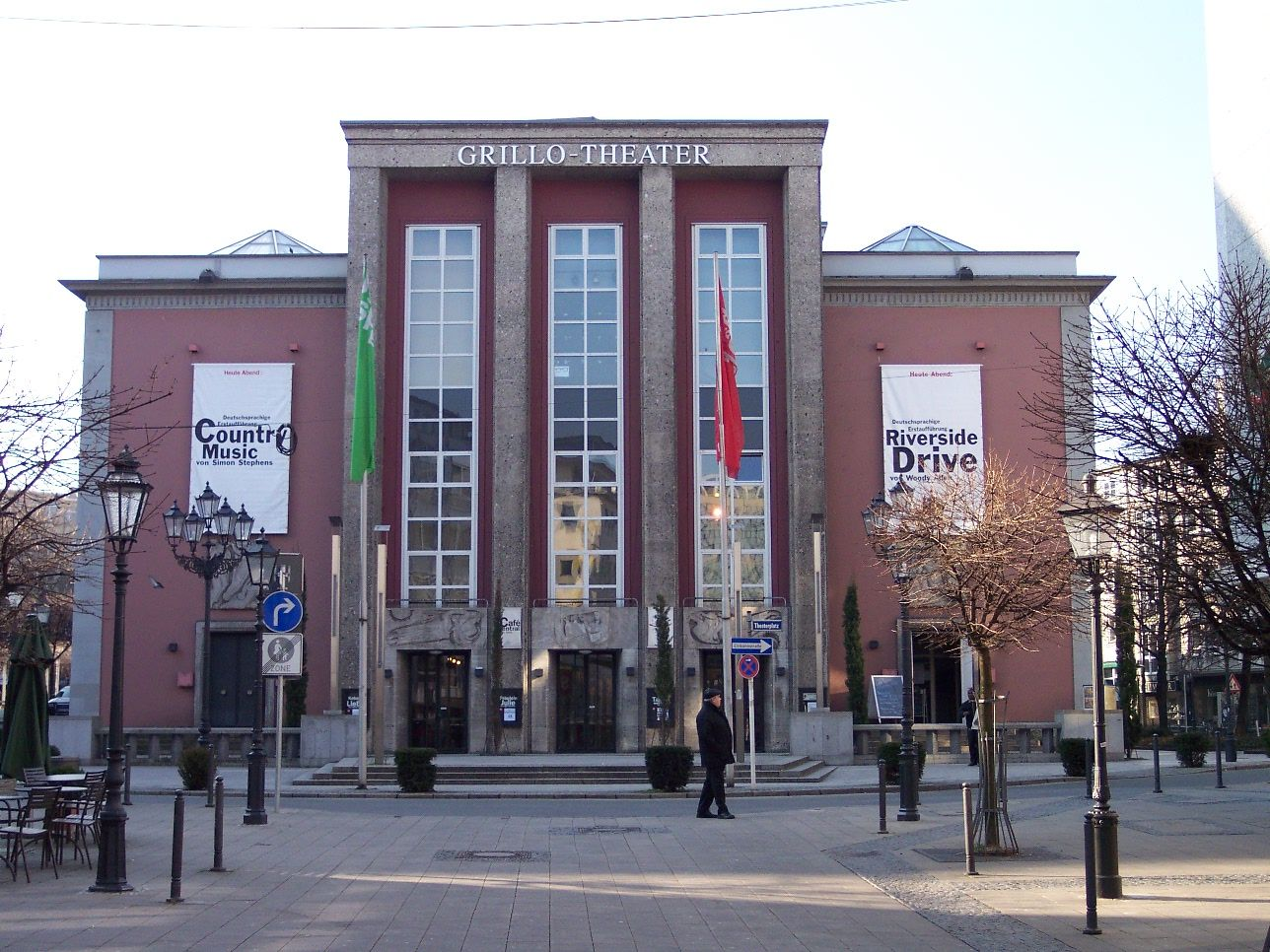
Grillo-Theater, 2005

Grillo-Theater is a theatre in Essen, Germany. Named after the industrialist Friedrich Grillo, who made the building possible, it opened on 16 September 1892 with Lessing's drama Minna von Barnhelm.

The building was badly damaged in World War II; it was restored with a much simpler façade and re-opened in 1950 with Wagner's opera Die Meistersinger von Nürnberg. Notable directors included Erwin Piscator, Jean-Louis Barrault, Heinz Dietrich Kenter, Hansgünther Heyme. Caspar Neher became head of design in 1927 and designed here eight operas and 11 plays.

In 1988, the role of the Grillo-Theater as Essen's major stage venue was taken by the newly constructed Aalto Theatre which also opened with Die Meistersinger. Following a major reconstruction by the architect Werner Ruhnau and a reduction of the auditorium from 670 to 400 seats, the Grillo-Theater became a flexible smaller venue; it re-opened in September 1990 with Shakespeare's A Midsummer Night's Dream.

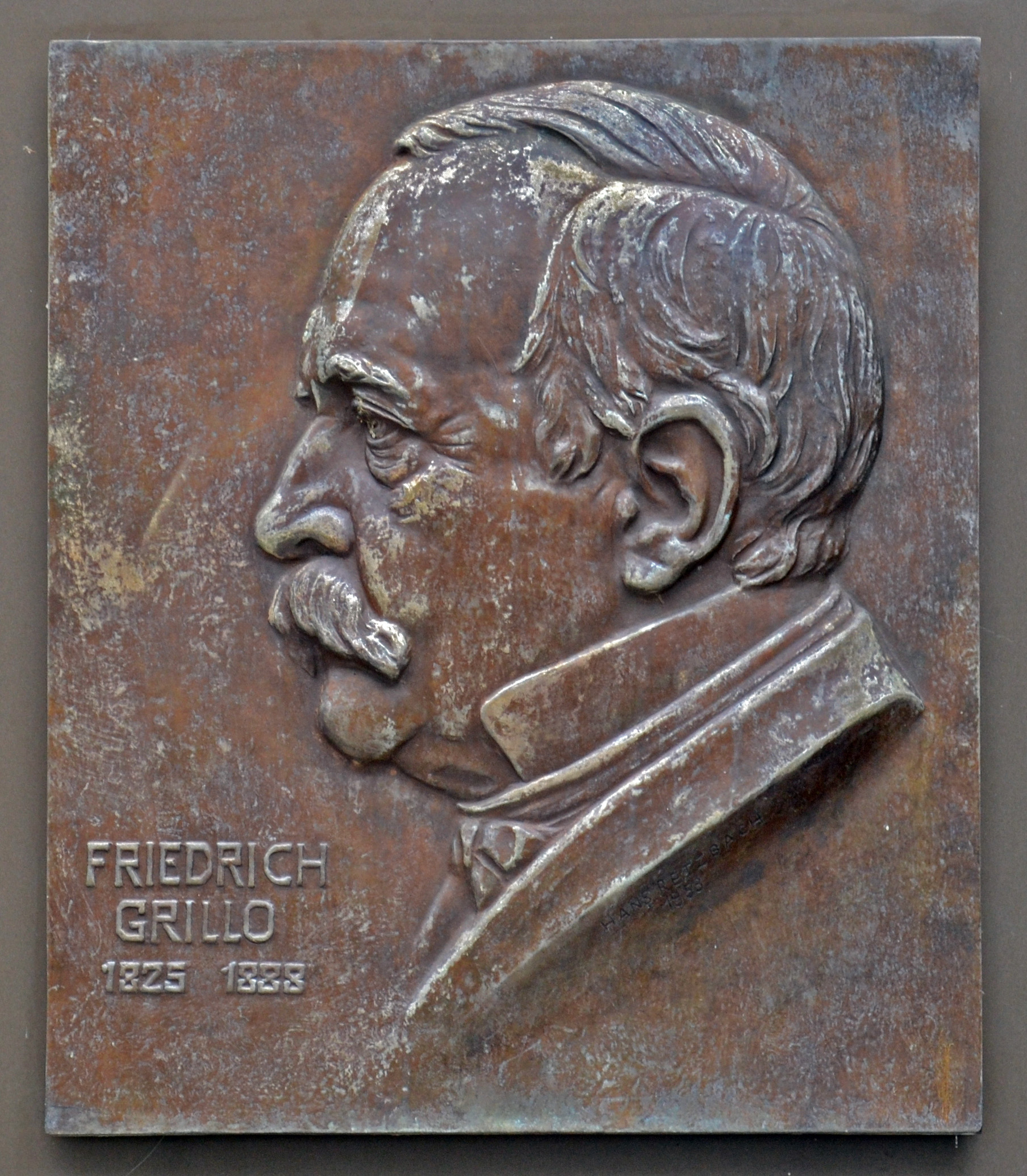
Commemorative plaque for Friedrich Grillo on the south side of the theatre
