= Mozarteum (disambiguation) =

Mozarteum is the Mozarteum University Salzburg in Salzburg, Austria – the university, its buildings and campus.

Mozarteum may also refer to one of several institutions and locations:

- New Mozartium, the main building of the Mozarteum University Salzburg
- International Mozarteum Foundation in Salzburg
  - Mozarteum (building), the building complex which houses the Foundation. It is sometimes referred to as the Old Mozarteum or the Mozarteum on Schwarzstraße
  - The Great Hall (Großer Saal), the concert hall within the Mozarteum (building)
- Mozarteum Orchestra Salzburg, the symphony orchestra of the city and state of Salzburg
- Mozarteum Argentino, a musical institution in Argentina
