= Mozarteum (building) =

Building complex in Salzburg, Austria

Coordinates: 47.8036°N 13.0419°E

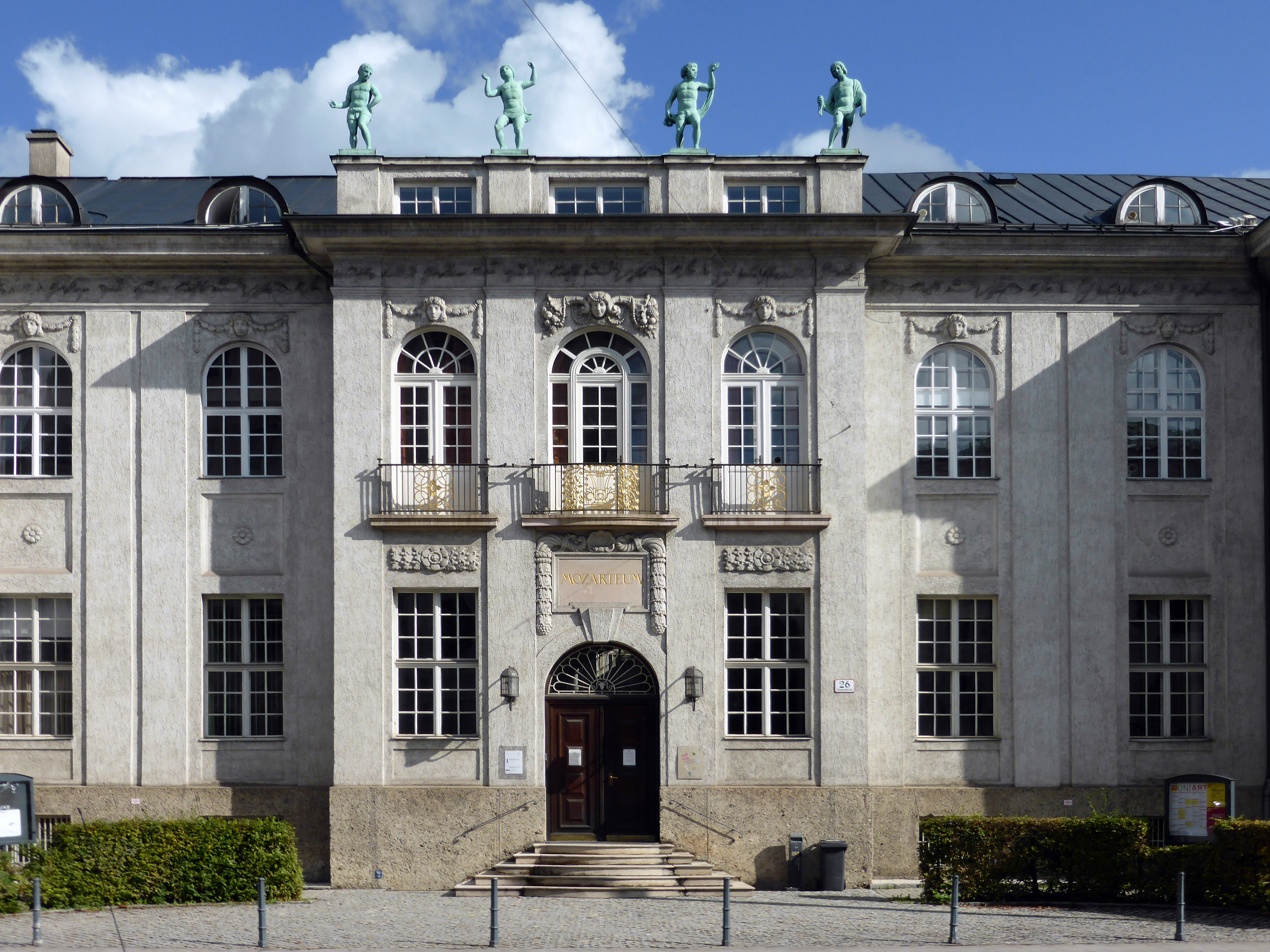
Mozarteum, entrance to the main building, Schwarzstraße 26

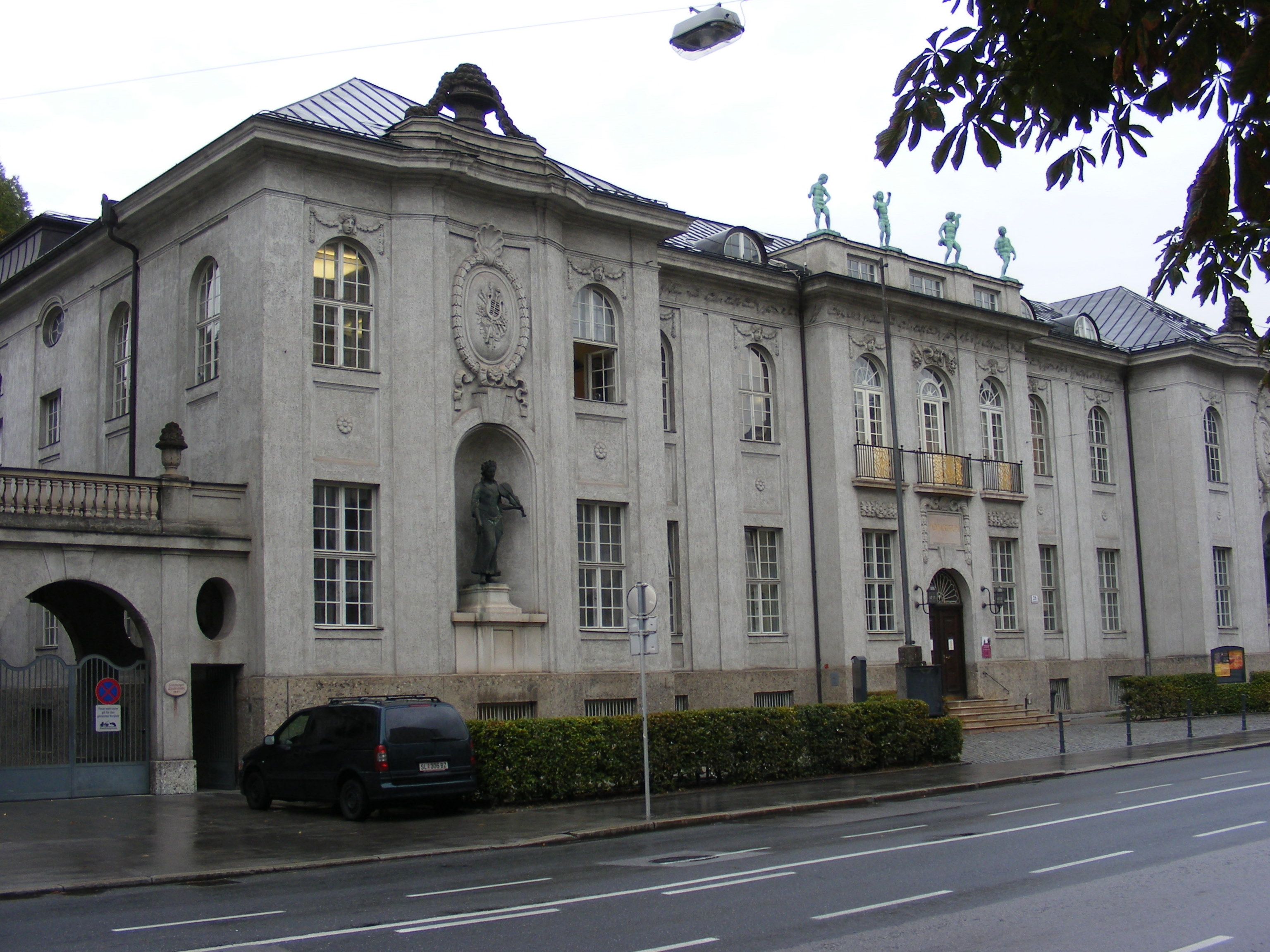
Mozarteum, main building

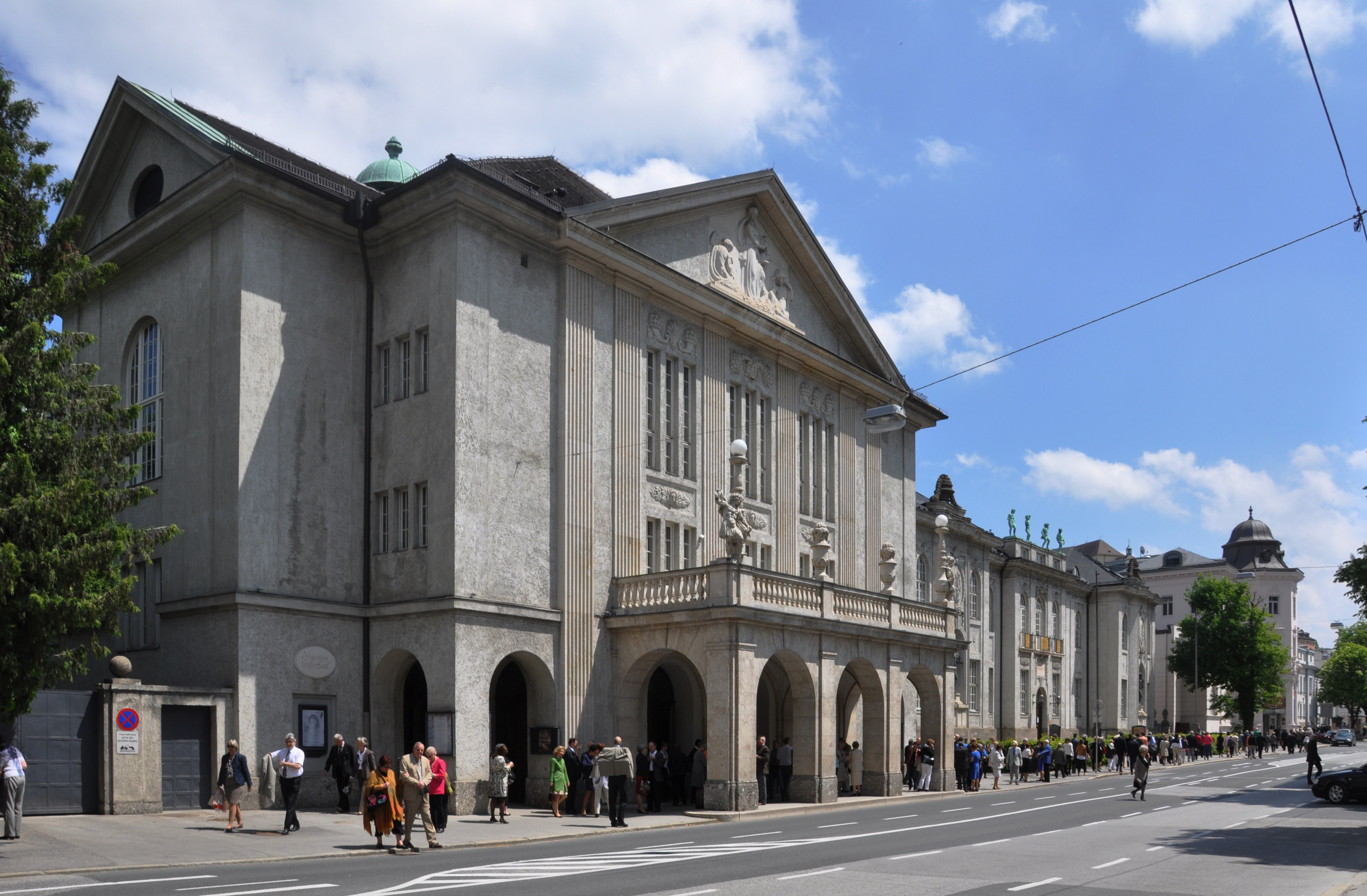
The Great Hall in foreground, and behind it the building at Schwarzstraße 26

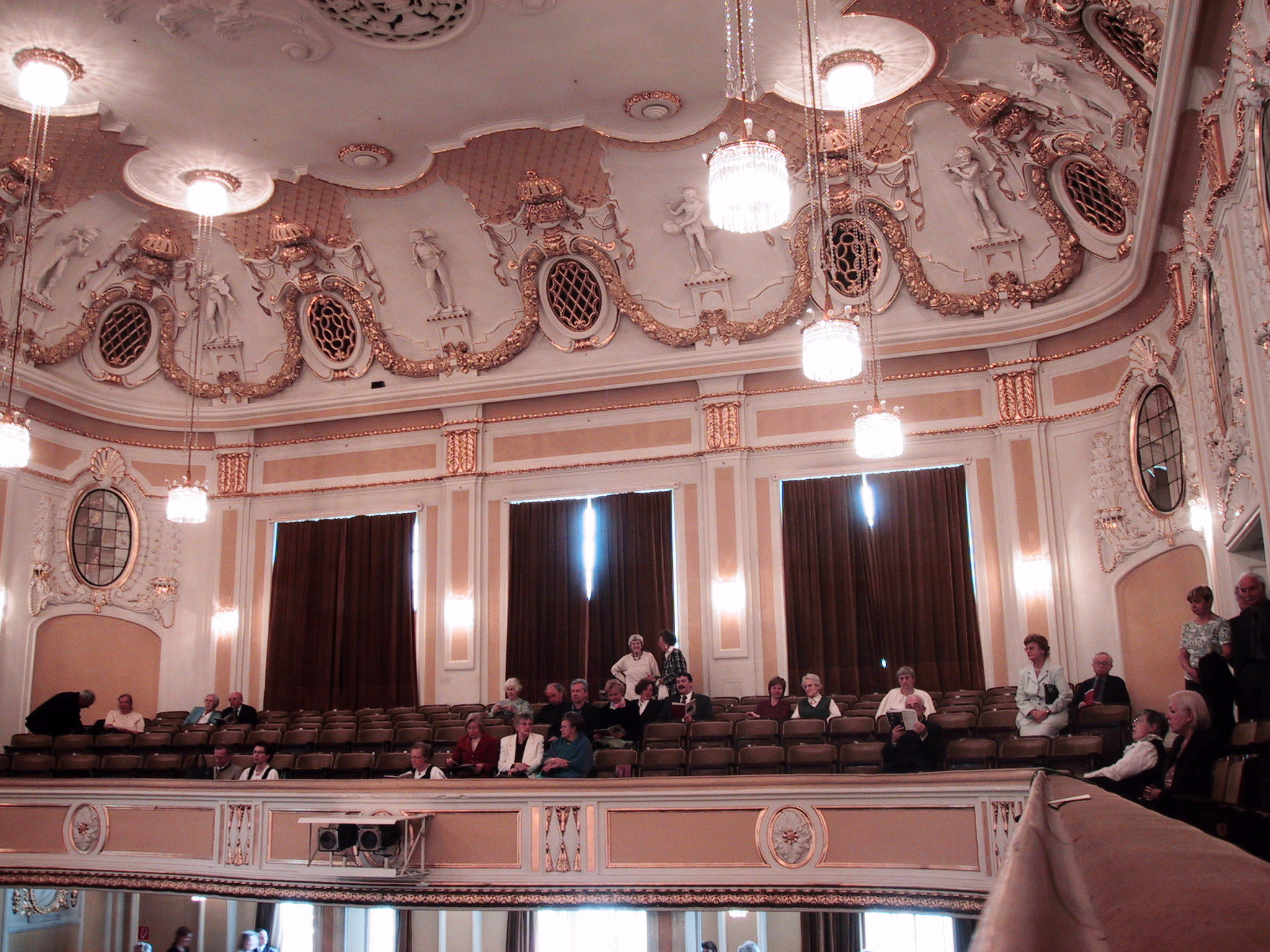
Great Hall, auditorium

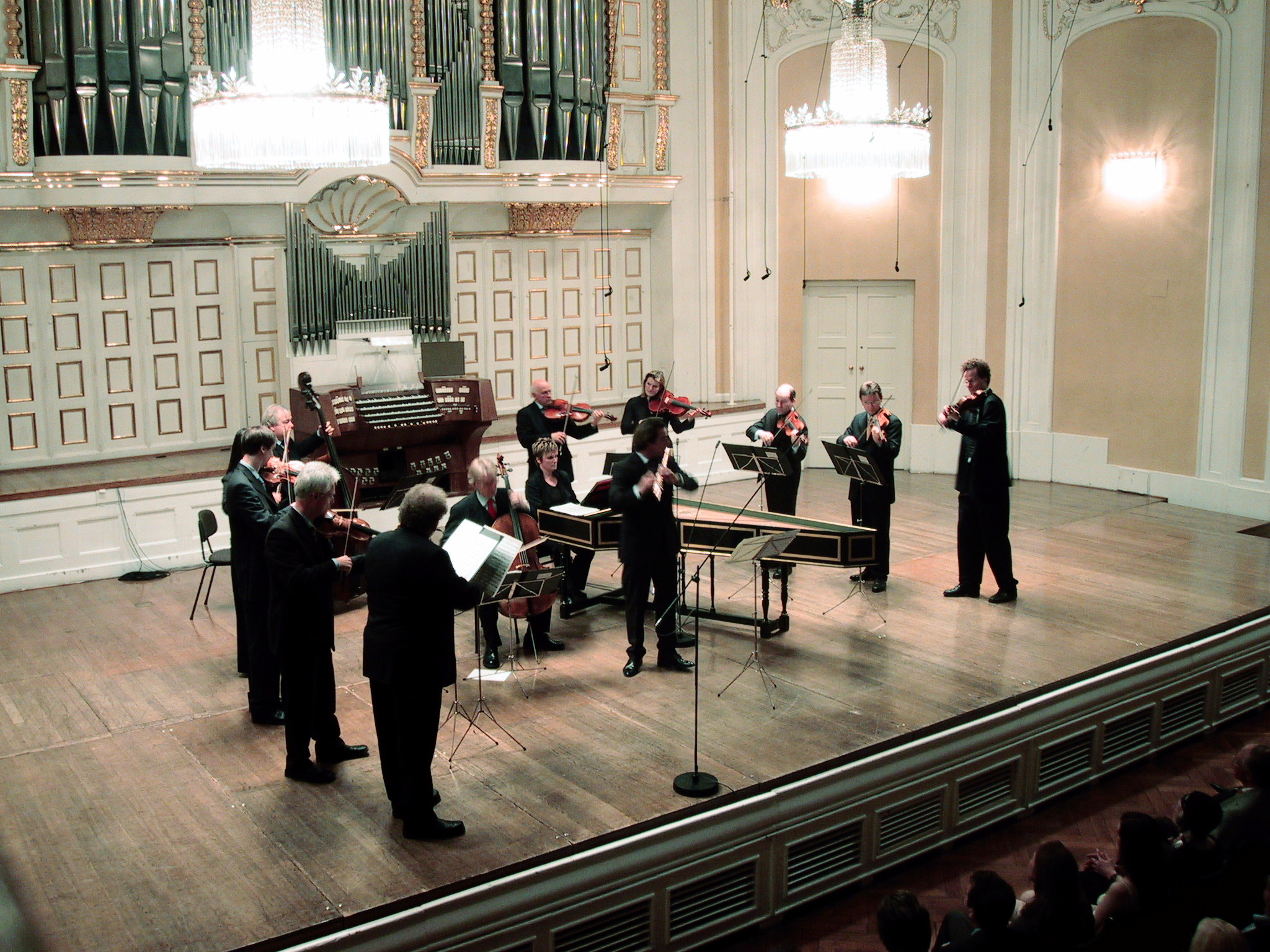
Musicians on the stage of the Great Hall, in front of the Arco organ (around 2005)

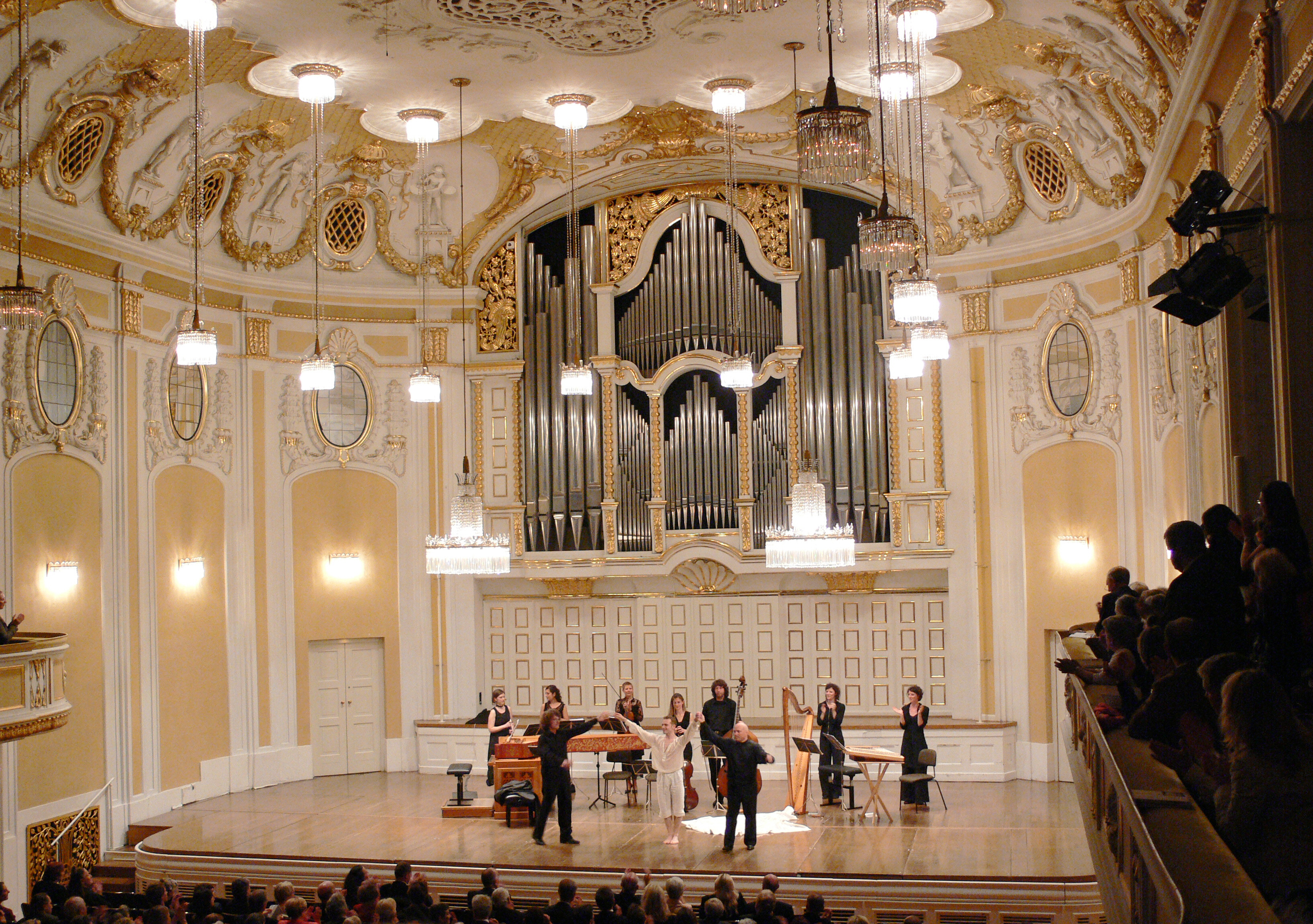
Great Hall: stage with Arco organ (2009)

The Mozarteum building complex on Schwarzstraße in Salzburg, Austria, was built in the historicist style and opened in 1914. The International Mozarteum Foundation is headquartered here. The Mozarteum also houses two concert halls – the Great Hall and the Vienna Hall – and an extensive Mozart library. The Salzburger Liedertafel (choral society) is also based at the Mozarteum.

Several other institutions, buildings or rooms have also been or are still referred to as the "Mozarteum", nowadays usually with a distinguishing addition such as "Mozarteum University Salzburg" or "New Mozarteum".

== Mozarteum in Schwarzstraße ==
=== Name ===
According to the commemorative plaque marking the laying of the foundation stone in 1910, the building was then still called "Mozarthaus". The name "Mozarthaus" can also be found on plans by the architect from 1911. On a plan from the year of the opening (1914), the building is called "Mozarteum". The name Mozarteum appears as a golden inscription with engraved capital letters above the entrance portal of the main building.

Since the Mozarteum University Salzburg is also often referred to as the "Mozarteum", the building on Schwarzstraße is sometimes called the "Mozarteum Building". To distinguish it more clearly from the nearby New Mozarteum University main building, the Schwarzstraße building is occasionally called the "Old Mozarteum" or the "Mozarteum on Schwarzstraße". The International Mozarteum Foundation often uses the name "Mozarteum Foundation" instead of the location name "Mozarteum", for example when announcing concerts held in its building. When people talk about a concert "at the Mozarteum", they usually mean the Great Hall inside the Foundation's building.

=== Location ===
The Mozarteum is part of Salzburg's Old Town (Altstadt) and is located on the right bank of the Salzach River on Schwarzstraße. The main building (Schwarzstraße 26) houses, among other things, the administrative offices of the International Mozarteum Foundation and the Vienna Hall (Wiener Saal). The Great Hall (Große Saal) in Schwarzstraße 28, structurally connected by a link wing, forms the second part of the building.

On the short stretch from the Mozarteum to Makartplatz to the southeast, the buildings of the Salzburg Marionette Theatre (Schwarzstraße 24) and the Salzburg State Theatre (Schwarzstraße 22) are located on the same side of the street. East of the Mozarteum, on the side facing away from the street, lies the southern end of the Mirabell Gardens and directly behind it the New Mozarteum (Mirabellplatz 1), the main campus of the Mozarteum University Salzburg.

=== Architectural history ===
The construction of a building for a music school, performances, and festivals had been planned by a Mozart building association since 1856. The foundation stone was laid on 6 August 1910, in the garden of the Villa Lasser in the presence of Emperor Franz Joseph I. Over the following four years, the building was constructed by the Munich Jugendstil architect Richard Berndl in the late historicist style (exteriorly characterised by a pronounced functionalism) and was opened on 29 September 1914.

A casino had been built in a vacant lot on Hanibalgasse, between the State Theatre and the Mozarteum. After its closure, this building was integrated around 1970 into the Mozarteum as the Hanibal Wing. A spacious library was established there, which also housed a record archive.

Since 2005, an inscription has been located on the façade of the main building directly below the eaves, repeating several times the Mozart quote, "Ich möchte alles haben, was gut, ächt und schön ist!" ("I want everything that is good, genuine, and beautiful!") Designed by the artist Sylvie Fleury, the inscription replicates Mozart's handwriting and consists of neon tubes that illuminate Mozart's saying during darkness.

Plans are currently being finalised to rebuild the connecting structure between the two building sections. From the perspective of the Foundation, the 60 square metres (650 sq ft) intermission foyer is far too small for up to 800 concertgoers in the Great Hall. The renovation would also make the area accessible and allow for better use of the garden. Concerns raised by heritage conservationists still need to be addressed. Johannes Honsig-Erlenburg, President of the Foundation, anticipated in September 2018 that construction would begin no earlier than February 2021 and take two to three years. On 22 October 2018, the Foundation presented the winning design from the international competition, in which 18 architectural firms from Europe and Japan participated.

In October 2022, the Foundation's president, Johannes Honsig-Erlenburg, opened a new glass foyer building, which was completed after two years of construction. The costs amounted to 11.7 million euros, approximately 21 per cent higher than originally planned due to price increases.

=== Concert halls and rooms ===
The International Mozarteum Foundation created two concert halls with the construction of the Mozarteum. The Great Hall, with approximately 800 seats, is one of Salzburg's most famous and popular concert halls. It is one of the venues for the Salzburg Festival, for example, as a performance location for the festival's matinees. The smaller Vienna Hall, located on the first floor of the main building, is designed for about 200 listeners and is used for chamber music concerts, rehearsals, and lectures.

In addition to the Vienna Hall, the main building houses administrative offices of the Foundation, teaching and rehearsal rooms used by the Mozarteum University Salzburg, and a Jugendstil-style Mozart Library. The Bibliotheca Mozartiana is the world's largest specialised library on the life and work of Wolfgang Amadeus Mozart. It comprises approximately 35,000 literary titles and more than 6,000 musical scores.

=== Organ in the Great Hall ===
The monumental Jugendstil organ was built by Rieger organ builders in 1914 with 80 stops (opus 2000); today, only its facade remains.

A completely new organ in neo-Baroque style was installed in 1970, the Arco organ, a four-manual instrument by Walcker organ builders which stood until 2006.

This organ was replaced in 2010 by the Propter Homines organ, an instrument built by Eule organ builders. Along with the Mertel organ in the Vienna Hall, it is one of the few concert organs in Salzburg. This slider chest instrument has 51 stops across three manuals and pedal. The key action is mechanical, the stop action electric. The instrument is supplied with wind by a symphonic wind system with three double bellows.

=== Organ of the Vienna Hall ===
The pipe organ in the small concert hall, invisibly located in an organ chamber above the stage, was built in 1914 by Rieger organ builders with 25 stops and electro-pneumatic action. It was rebuilt in 1941, including a new console and some neo-Baroque modifications. The organ is in bad condition, but still playable.

=== Magic Flute House ===
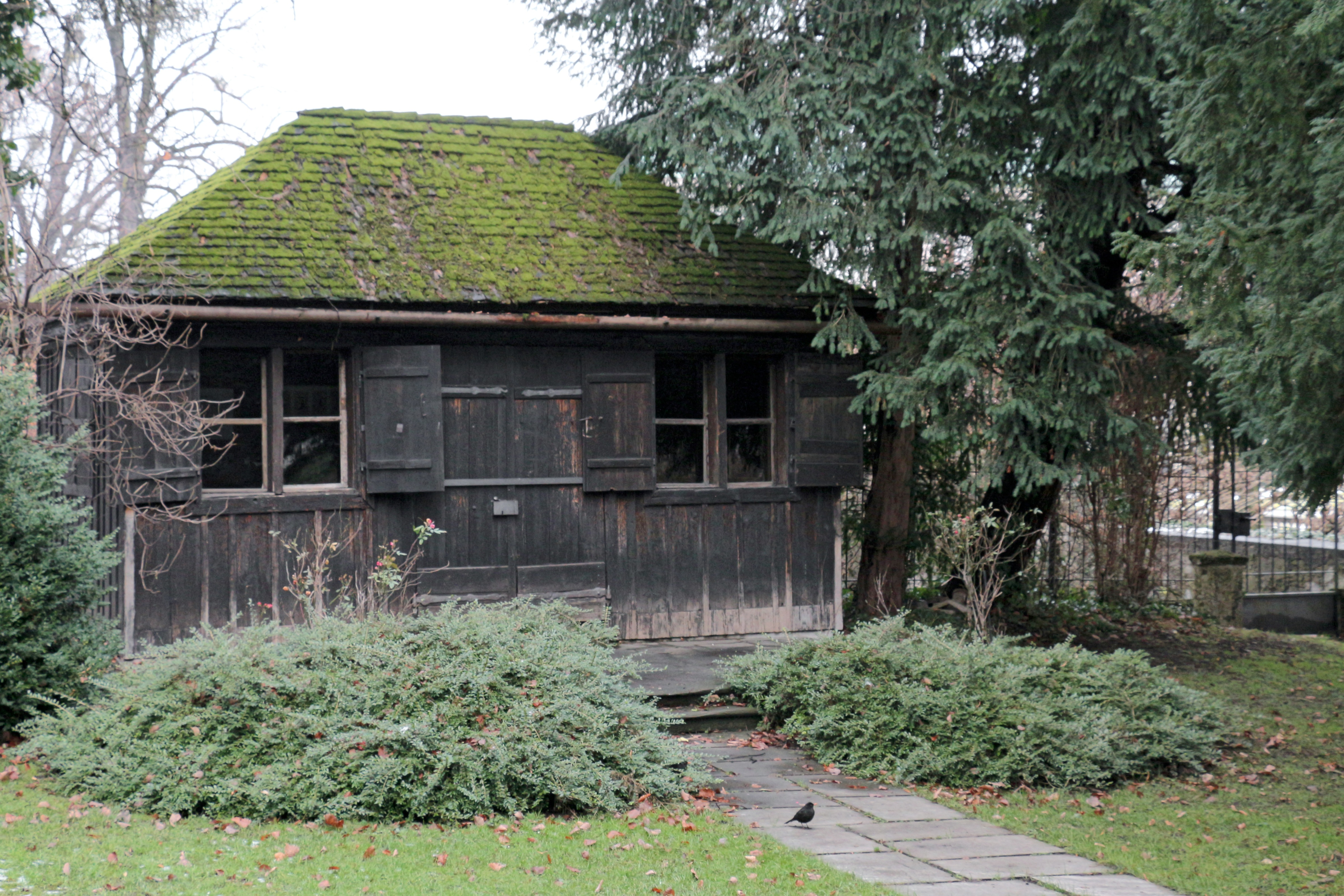
The Magic Flute House on the terrace of the Great Hall (2014)

Until 2022, the Bastion Garden of the Mozarteum housed the "Magic Flute House," in which Mozart is said to have composed parts of his opera The Magic Flute in Vienna. It was originally located next to the Theater auf der Wieden in Vienna; The Magic Flute premiered in this theatre on 30 September 1791.

In 1873, the previous owner, Prince Camillo Heinrich Starhemberg, donated the Magic Flute House to the International Mozart Foundation. The Magic Flute House was moved from Vienna to Salzburg in 1877 and initially placed on the Kapuzinerberg hill behind the Mozart Monument, above the Capucines cloister. As an inscription on the Mozart Monument indicates, the house was moved to the courtyard of the Mozarteum on 6 May 1950, at the behest of the museum director, Rigobert Funke-Elbstadt. From there, it was accessible from the concert halls and could be viewed during the summer events in the Great Hall. In 2022, it was renovated and moved to the courtyard of the Mozart House (Tanzmeisterhaus).

== Other buildings with the name "Mozarteum" ==
A "Mozarteum", generally speaking, is a place dedicated to Mozart; this could be, for example, a Mozart museum or a concert hall where Mozart's musical works are performed. Historically, various places have been called Mozarteums. The term should therefore be understood and interpreted within its historical context.

=== 19th century ===
In a travelogue entitled "A Visit to the Salzburg Mozarteum". published in the magazine Die Gartenlaube in 1866, the anonymous author first describes his arduous search for the Mozarteum in Salzburg. He explains to readers that the Mozarteum, as part of the then-existing institution of the Cathedral Music Society and Mozarteum, was a "musical institution for the dignified preservation of Mozart's memory in his native city". The Mozarteum was also "entrusted with the care of the archive, which includes, in particular, a collection of original paintings from the Mozart family, as well as some instruments and a considerable number of Mozart's manuscripts". The author also refers to the location of this Mozart archive as the Mozarteum. At that time, however, the name "Mozarteum" was not clearly associated with any building: "It was, of course, difficult to ascertain from the good people of Salzburg where the Mozarteum could be found […] and further inquiries only resulted in us soon being sent to Mozart's birthplace, his residence, and finally even to his statue." Only after a vague hint did the author finally find the Mozarteum he was looking for, that is, the Mozart Archive, in a room of the Chiemseehof palace.

In 1880, the Mozarteum Public Music School began operating in some rooms of the Salzburg Teacher Training College at Hofstallgasse 2. By 1889, additional teaching rooms had been added in the Anatomy Building in Hofstallgasse. Above the entrance portal of the Anatomy Building, a large sign read Öffentliche Musikschule Mozarteum (Mozarteum Public Music School). This location, the seat of the music school at that time, is referred to as the "Old Mozarteum" in a book about the music educator Eberhard Preußner.

=== Recent usage ===
The Munich architect Robert Rechenauer designed the current New Mozarteum, the main campus and headquarters of the Mozarteum University Salzburg, between 2004 and 2006. He usually refers to the building complex simply as the Mozarteum, as is also the title of his book about the construction project. He also refers to the previous building complex from 1978, which Rechenauer had partly demolished and partly completely rebuilt and renovated, as the Mozarteum – or as the old Mozarteum. When the New Mozarteum is meant exclusively and repeatedly, the shortened designation Mozarteum is appropriate. However, the mere fact that a New Mozarteum has existed since 1978 provides grounds for possibly referring to the Mozarteum on Schwarzstraße more precisely, for example as the Old Mozarteum (see above).

== See also ==
- International Mozarteum Foundation
- Mozarteum Orchestra Salzburg
- Mozarteum University Salzburg
