= Mozart's residence =

Mozart's residence may refer to one of several places where Wolfgang Amadeus Mozart resided that are now museums:

- Mozart's birthplace, where he resided from his birth in 1756 to 1773
- Tanzmeisterhaus Salzburg, where he resided from 1773 to 1781
- Mozarthaus Vienna, where he resided from 1784 to 1787
