= Hummel (surname) =

Hummel is a surname. Notable people with the surname include:

- Arvid David Hummel (1778–1836), Swedish entomologist and notary
- Arthur W. Hummel Jr. (1920–2001), American diplomat
- Arthur W. Hummel Sr. (1884–1975), missionary and Sinologist
- Bertold Hummel (1925–2002), German composer of classical music
- Carl Hummel (1821–1907), German landscape painter, son of Johann Nepomuk
- Charles F. Hummel (born 1932), American museum curator
- Cooper Hummel (born 1994), German-American baseball player
- Don Hummel (1907–1988), American businessman and politician
- Ferdinand Hummel (1855–1928), German composer and musician
- Franz Hummel (1939–2022), German composer and pianist
- Frederick P. Hummel (1856–1915), American lawyer and politician
- George Hummel (born 1976), Namibian football player
- George Hummel (business manager) (1887–1965), American business manager
- Hermann Hummel (1876–1952), German politician
- Jake Hummel (born 1999), American football player
- Jeremy Hummel (born 1974), American drummer
- Jim Hummel, American cartoonist
- Johann Erdmann Hummel (1769–1852), German painter
- Johann Nepomuk Hummel (1778–1837), Austrian composer and pianist
- Johann Wilhelm Bentz, nicknamed Hans Hummel (1787–1854), Hamburg folk-icon
- John Hummel (1883–1959), American baseball player
- Joseph Friedrich Hummel (1841–1919), Austrian composer and musician
- Joye Hummel (1924–2021), American comic book author
- Kenny van Hummel (born 1982), Dutch road bicycle racer
- Maria Innocentia Hummel (1909–1946), German Franciscan nun, painter and designer of Hummel figurines
- Mark Hummel (born 1955), American blues harmonica player
- Peter W. Hummel (1929–2015), American geologist and oil company president
- Ralph P. Hummel (1937–2012), American professor of public administration
- Rand Hummel (born 1956), American preacher and author
- Reinhart Hummel (1930–2007), German theologian
- Rick Hummel (1946–2023), American author and sports columnist
- Robbie Hummel (born 1989), American basketball player
- Siegbert Hummel (1908–2001), German Tibetologist and cultural historian
- Walter Hummel (athlete) (1892–1978), American athlete
- Walter Hummel (musicologist) (1883–1968), Austrian musicologist and pedagogue
