= Mozart Week =

Classical music festival in Salzburg, Austria

Mozart Week Mozartwoche
- Genre: Classical music; Opera
- Date: Late January
- Frequency: Annual
- Venue: Mozarteum and others
- Locations: Salzburg, Austria
- Inaugurated: 1956; 70 years ago
- Leader: Rolando Villazón, Artistic Director
- Organiser: International Mozarteum Foundation (ISM)
- Website: mozarteum.at/en/mozart-week

The Mozart Week (German: Mozartwoche) is a classical music festival centred on Wolfgang Amadeus Mozart, held every year in his native Salzburg. It was created in 1956 on the 200th anniversary of his birth, and coincides with his birthday 27 January, lasting in fact slightly over a week.

Although the festival has Mozart's music in focus and perspective, it also features works by his contemporaries, composers of the prior eras who inspired him, and those of later eras he influenced in return, and, since the 2000s, new works commissioned to contemporary composers. It typically includes orchestral and chamber music concerts and recitals as well as regular opera performances, featuring international orchestras and artists. Since the turn of the 2010s, it has also experimented with other genres of the performing arts.

It is organised by the International Mozarteum Foundation (ISM). The Mexican tenor Rolando Villazón has been its artistic director since 2019, with a contract running until 2031.

== History ==
The Mozarteum originally organised a Salzburg Mozart Festival (Salzburger Mozartfest) on an occasional basis. The first was in 1877, marked by the first appearance of the Vienna Philharmonic in Salzburg and in fact out of Vienna. Others followed in 1879, 1887 (the 100th anniversary of the premiere of Don Giovanni), 1891 (the 100th anniversary of the composer's death), 1901, 1904, 1906 (the 150th anniversary of his birth), and 1910; one was planned for 1914 but cancelled due to the outbreak of the Great War. Suggestions of an annual event, inspired by the Bayreuth Festival, did not come to fruition, chiefly for lack of funds as well as due to the inadequate local artistic resources. The Salzburg Festival was eventually created in 1920, but organised every summer independently of the ISM and, although putting an emphasis on Mozart at a time when the newly-standalone German-Austria was seeking to define its identity, open to a broader repertoire.

The Mozart Week was created in 1956 as part of the celebration of the 200th anniversary of Mozart's birth on 27 January 1756, as approved by the Federal Ministry of Education in 1953. (Note: The festival is unrelated to the Mozart Week of the German Reich (Mozart-Woche des Deutschen Reiches), organised by Nazi authorities in 1941 on the 150th anniversary of Mozart's death, and which took place in Vienna. It was the climax of a year of celebrations across Germany and annexed Austria, some of which in Salzburg, in order to celebrate Mozart as a German composer.) Its original focus was to rediscover and revive little-known works from Mozart's prolific production, especially the earliest of his 22 operas, with academic and critical concerns over interpretative practice, echoing the start of the historically informed performance movement as well as the launch of the Neue Mozart-Ausgabe in 1956.

The first edition opened at the Salzburger Landestheater with a performance of La finta semplice (1769), staged by Géza Rech and conducted by Bernhard Paumgartner with the present Camerata Salzburg; they made the first recording of the opera, composed by a 12-year-old Mozart but withdrawn, and of which the first confirmed performance had taken place only in 1921. It also included a staging of Idomeneo (1781) by Oscar Fritz Schuh, as a preview of the next Salzburg Festival. Performances were conducted by Karl Böhm and Carl Schuricht with the Vienna Philharmonic, Herbert von Karajan with the Philharmonia Orchestra, and Joseph Keilberth with the Bamberg Symphony, and among the guest singers and soloists were Géza Anda, Wilhelm Backhaus, Clara Haskil, Tatiana Nikolayeva, Igor Oistrakh, Wolfgang Schneiderhan, Irmgard Seefried, and Rita Streich.

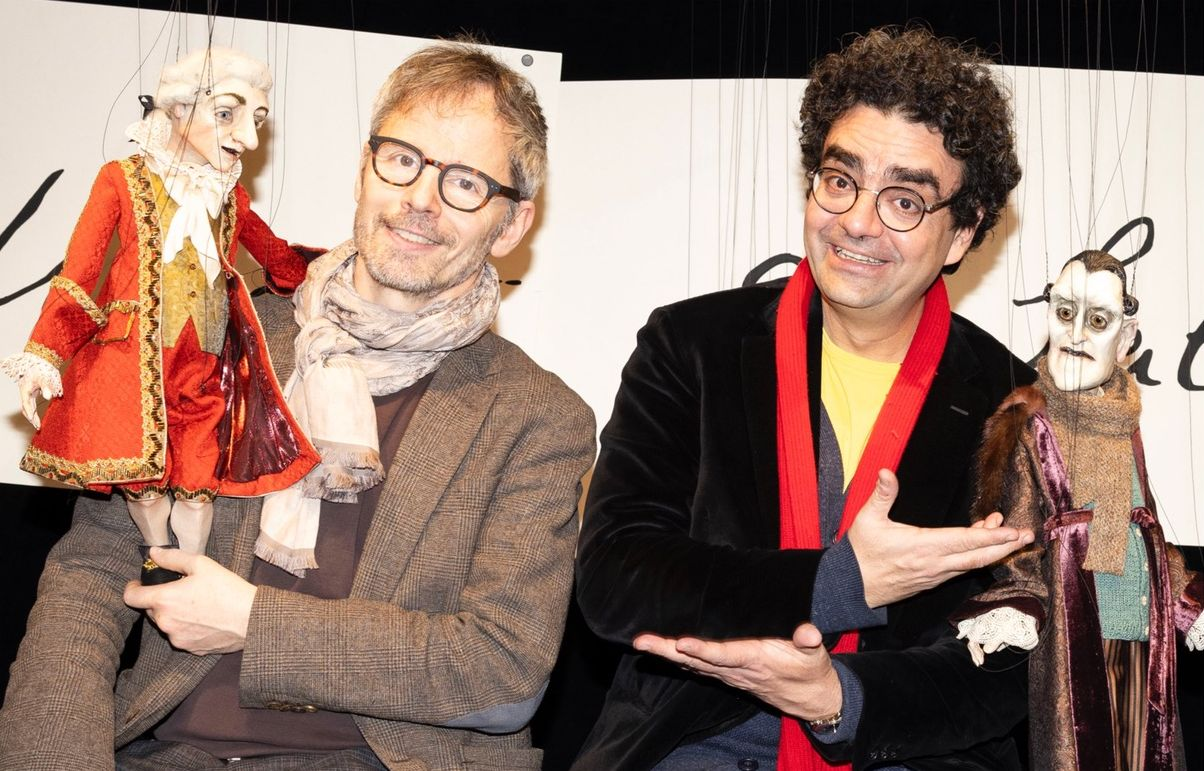
The actor Matthias Bundschuh with Rolando Villazón during the 2024 edition, at which he staged a marionette production of Nikolai Rimsky-Korsakov's Mozart and Salieri at the Salzburg Marionette Theatre.

Programmes originally included mainly works by Mozart's contemporaries of the classical period in addition to his own. They were first expanded to earlier composers who had influenced him in 1959, with George Frideric Handel on the 200th anniversary of his death. Starting in 2004, on an initiative of the new artistic director Stephan Pauly, they have increasingly featured later composers up to the present day, including commissions of new works and composers-in-residence. Pauly also called for new forms of performing arts to be featured at the Mozart Week, and “to dare to experiment and think artistically about how to present music in concert in the 21st century.”

The Mexican tenor Rolando Villazón became artistic director from the 2019 edition, with a contract eventually extended to run until 2031. In 2021, he also became artistic director of the Mozarteum Foundation. He announced his intention to bring the festival “back to its root” and to Mozart's music, which was featured exclusively on his first edition, although heard in a range of styles and interpretations, and supported by new partnership with local institutions in order for the whole town to celebrate Mozart. In addition to singing himself, he has acted as stage director at the festival.

During the COVID-19 pandemic in Austria, the 2021 edition was replaced with a reduced programme streamed online, as the updated government regulations on social distancing made it unpractical to plan 56 events in eleven days with enough certainly. The 2022 was cancelled entirely at short notice due to the spread of the Omicron variant.

== Programmes ==
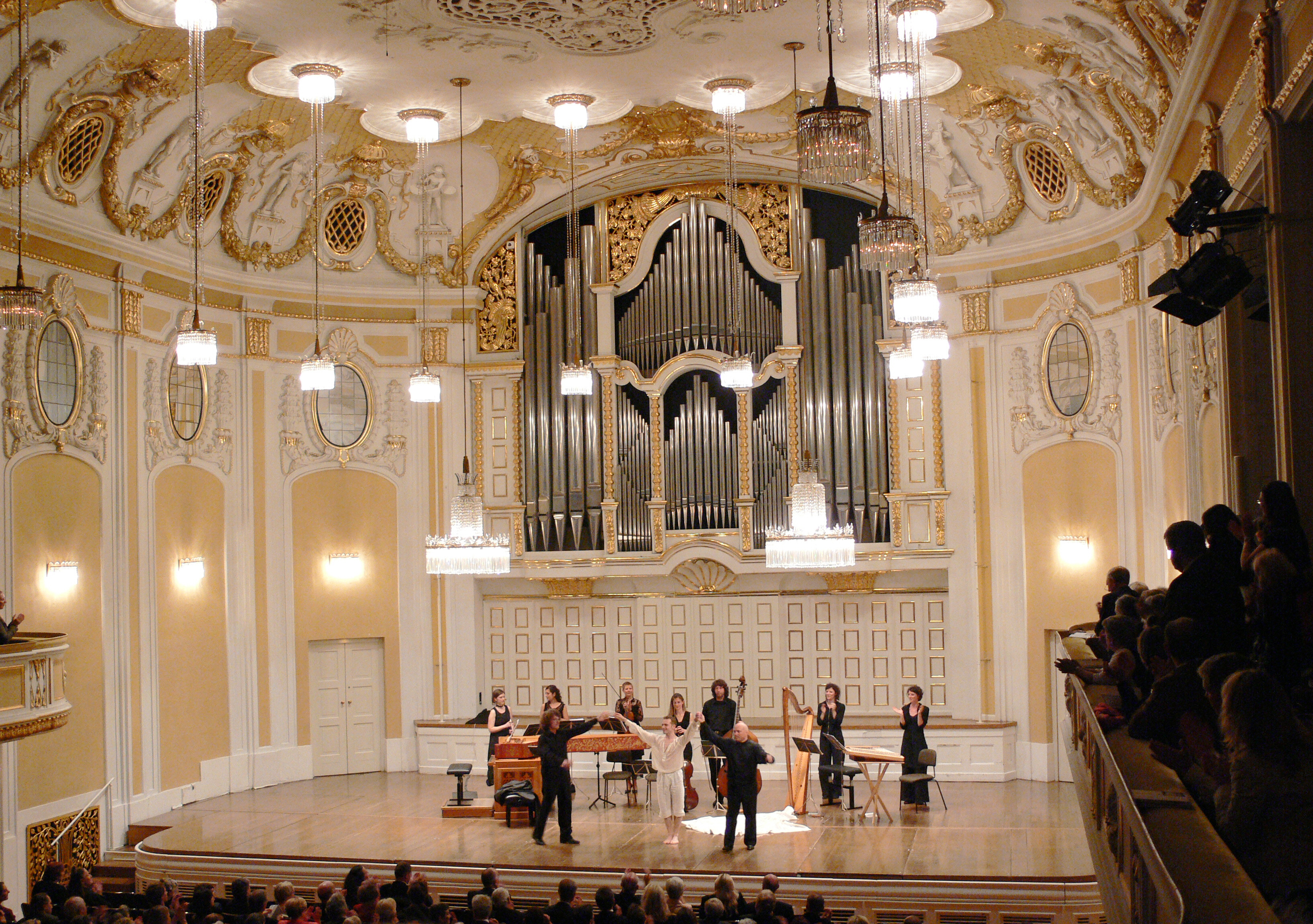
The Great Hall of the Mozarteum.

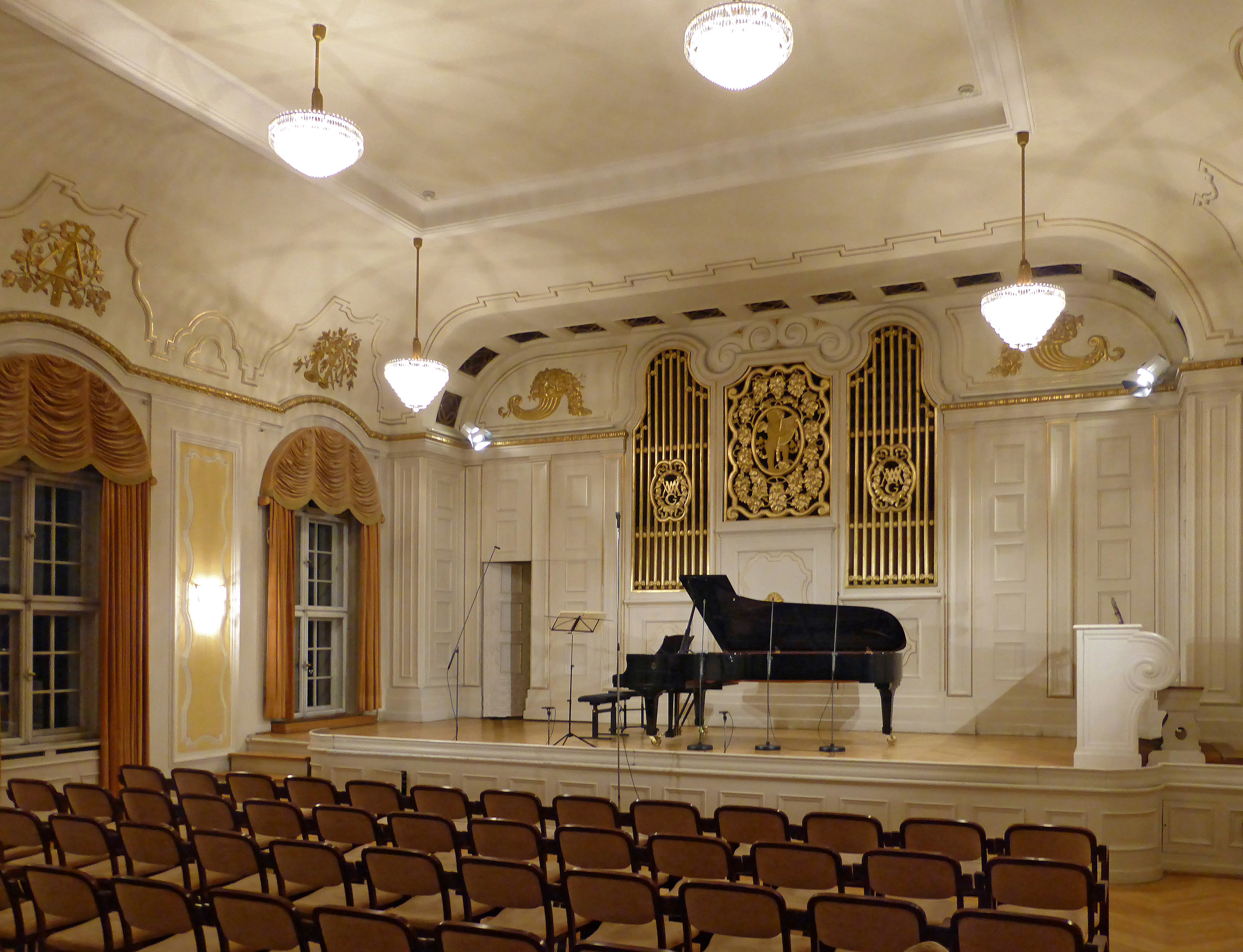
Vienna Hall at the Mozarteum.

The programmes of the Mozart Week have Wolfgang Amadeus Mozart and his music in focus and perspective, but, despite its name, are not limited to his own compositions, and have long included works by his contemporaries, composers of the previous eras he drew inspiration from, and those up to the present day. Also, it lasts in fact about ten days, with a busy schedule of around fifty performances.

Most performances are orchestral and chamber music concerts and recitals. Operas are also regularly featured, either fully or semi-staged or in concert performance. Other genres have been experimented, such as dance, with a commission to Sasha Waltz, equestrian shows, with Bartabas and his Equestrian Show Academy, marionettes, at the Salzburg Marionette Theatre, and a Mozart Kinderorchester, a youth orchestra formed by music students aged 7 to 12.

The festival has always invited a number of prominent conductors, singers and soloists and international ensembles. It has a close association with the Vienna Philharmonic, which has been present since its early years and has appeared at every edition since 1961 with up to three concerts, and to the local Mozarteum Orchestra Salzburg and Camerata Salzburg. A number of conductors appeared with the Vienna Philharmonic for the first time at the Mozart Week, in the festival's early decades because they shared its repertoire and approach, such as Sylvain Cambreling, John Eliot Gardiner, Leopold Hager, Nikolaus Harnoncourt, Yehudi Menuhin, and Roger Norrington, more recently Alain Altinoglu and Robin Ticciati.

Most performances take place in the two concert halls of the old Mozarteum building, the Great Hall (Große Saal) and smaller Vienna Hall (Wiener Saal), as well as in the Great Hall (Große Aula) of the University of Salzburg, where Mozart himself performed and which was substantially redesigned in modern times. Performances of opera or with a large orchestra take place at the adjoining performing venues of the Salzburg Festival, the Great Festival Theatre, the smaller Haus für Mozart and the open-air Felsenreitschule, or at the Salzburger Landestheater.

The festival has edited a substantial programme booklet since 1971, with essays, introductions and pictures.

=== Artists-in-residence ===
- 2006: Nikolaus Harnoncourt, conductor
- 2008: Pierre-Laurent Aimard, pianist
- 2012: Mitsuko Uchida, pianist

=== Composers-in-residence ===
- 2009: Pierre Boulez
- 2010: György Kurtág
- 2012: Mark Andre
- 2013: Johannes Maria Staud
- 2014: Arvo Pärt
- 2018: Jörg Widmann

=== Tours ===
In 2019, Rolando Villazón created Mozart Week on Tour (Mozartwoche on Tour), a touring project which brings some festival programmes to other cities. Performances have been given at the Aix-en-Provence Easter Festival in Aix-en-Provence, France in April 2019, at the Pierre Boulez Saal in Berlin, Germany in December 2022, and at the Mozart Festival in Medellín, Colombia in October 2024, following the appearance of the Orquesta Iberacademy at the 2023 Mozart Week.

== Governance and funding ==
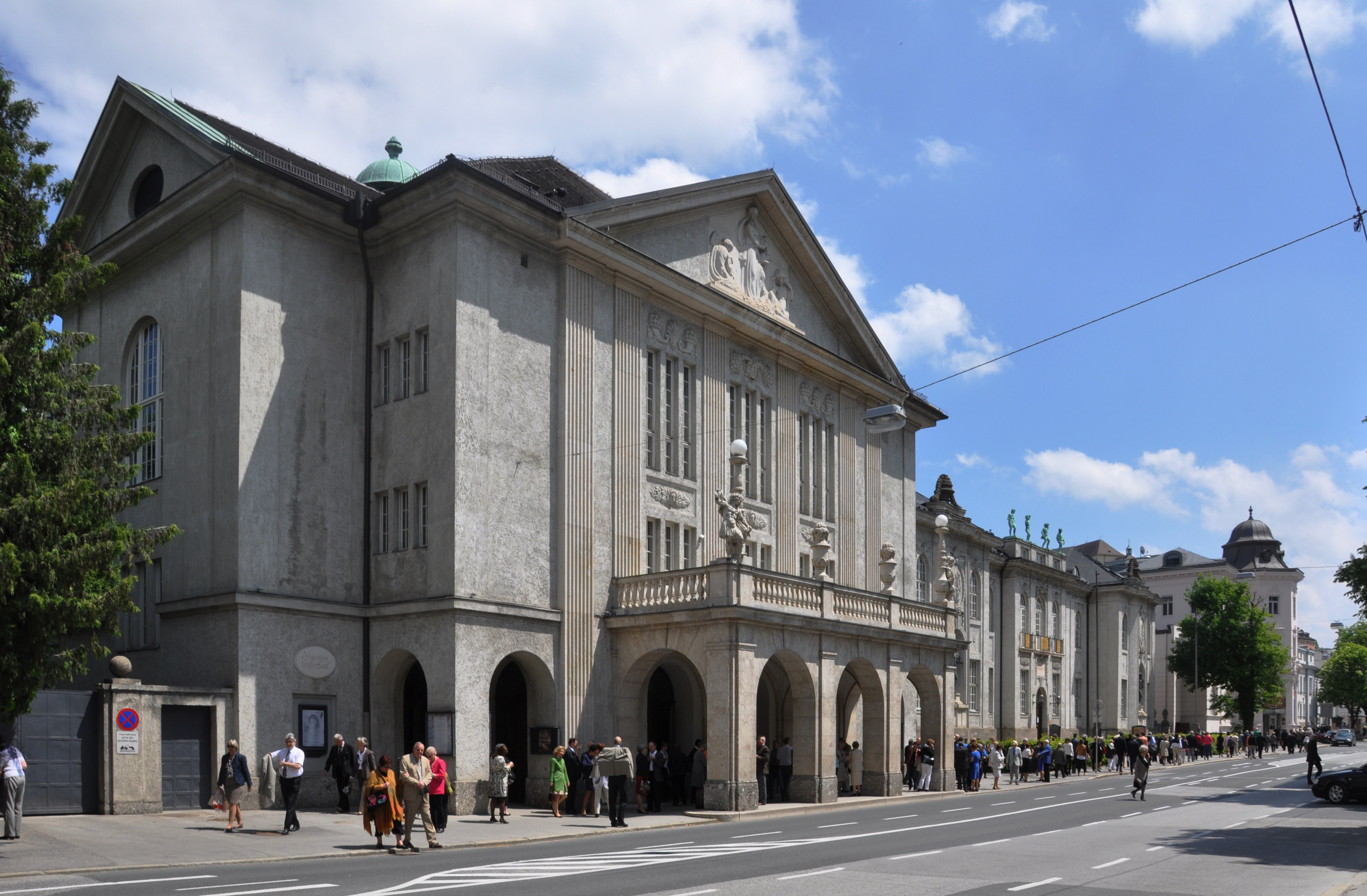
The Mozarteum building, with the Great Hall to the left.

The Mozart Week is produced by the International Mozarteum Foundation (ISM), originally founded in 1841 with the support of the composer's widow Constanze Mozart and their two sons Karl Thomas Mozart and Franz Xaver Wolfgang Mozart, and today organised as a voluntary association. The responsibility of artistic director (Intendant) of the festival has often been held jointly with the position of artistic director (künstlerischer Leiter) of the foundation.

It is independent from the other classical music and opera festivals held in the city, the Salzburg Easter Festival (founded 1967), the Salzburg Whitsun Festival (founded 1973), and the summertime Salzburg Festival (founded 1920). The ISM also produces a concert season during the rest of the year, as well as another festival, Dialoge, founded in 2006.

As is common for a number of opera festivals, especially those which only give a reduced number of performances, the staged productions of the Mozart Week are sometimes in co-production, for example with the summer festival.

=== Artistic directors ===
- 1985–1997: Wolfgang Rehm
- 1998–2003: Josef Tichý, also artistic director of the ISM
- 2004–2012: Stephan Pauly, also artistic director of the ISM
- 2013–2017: Marc Minkowski, in association with Matthias Schulz, the artistic director of the ISM
- 2018: Maren Hofmeister, also artistic director of the ISM
- 2019–present (until 2031): Rolando Villazón, also artistic director of the ISM (from 2021)

== Media ==
A number of performances have been broadcast by the Österreichischer Rundfunk (ORF), some later released commercially.

== Awards and honours ==
- 2024: Austrian Music Theatre Prize — Special Prize for “Best Festival”

== See also ==
- List of classical music festivals
