= Alois Taux =

German conductor and composer

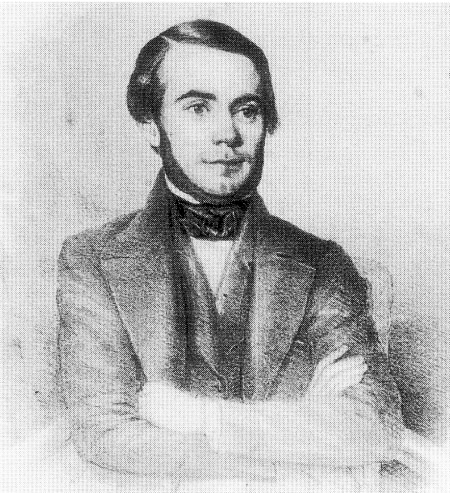
- Taux in 1847
- Born: October 5, 1817; Baumgarten, Silesia (now Braszowice, Poland)
- Died: April 17, 1861 (aged 43); Salzburg, Austria
- Occupations: conductor, composer

Alois Taux (5 October 1817 – 17 April 1861) was a German conductor and composer. He was important in the musical life of Salzburg, and initiated music festivals there dedicated to Mozart.

== Life ==
Taux was born in Baumgarten, in Silesia (now Braszowice in Poland); he showed musical talent at an early age, and during school years he learned to play violin and organ, and composed church pieces. He took lessons in piano and organ from the organist at the abbey of Camenz (now Kamieniec Ząbkowicki). He was admitted to Prague Conservatory in 1834, where he studied with Bedřich Diviš Weber and the horn player Johann Nepomuk Janatka.

In 1837 he joined the theatre orchestra in Graz, playing second violin and later horn. In 1839 he went to Linz, where he was assistant director of the theatre orchestra.

=== Salzburg ===
Later in 1839 Taux became director of the orchestra at the theatre in Salzburg, where he conducted performances of operas and other musical stage works. His reputation grew rapidly, and in 1841 he became musical director of the Dom-Musik-Verein ("Cathedral Music Society", now the Mozarteum Orchestra Salzburg) and director of the Mozarteum, a teaching institution. They were founded in that year to revive the musical life of Salzburg, after the abolition of the courts of the prince-archbishop and prince-elector had made the court orchestra less important. He remained in these posts for the rest of his life.

He founded in 1847 the Salzburger Liedertafel, a men's choir, of which he was musical director to 1850 and from 1858 until his death. He became in 1858 choirmaster of the Salzburg Singakademie. Invited to conduct at various venues, he travelled to Germany, Belgium, England and France; an autograph collection, preserved by the Salzburger Liedertafel, shows that he met cultural figures including Hector Berlioz, Felix Mendelssohn, Robert Schumann and Richard Wagner.

He took part in celebrations at the unveiling of the Mozart Monument in Salzburg in 1842, and in 1852 organized a celebration to mark this event. In 1856, the centenary of Mozart's birth, he organized a festival in which he conducted several concerts with music by Mozart. These events are regarded as the forerunners of the later annual Salzburg Festival.

He died in 1861, during a rehearsal with the Salzburger Liedertafel. He was buried in the St Sebastian Cemetery in Salzburg; he was later reburied in Salzburg Municipal Cemetery, in a grave of honour ("Ehrengrab").

=== Family ===
Taux married in 1850 Anna Freiin Dubsky von Wittenau (c. 1820 – 1907). She had attended Prague Conservatory, and was an opera singer, at venues including from 1844 to 1846 in minor roles at the Theater am Kärntnertor in Vienna, moving to Salzburg in 1848. They had five daughters.

== Biographer's commentary ==
His biographer in Biographisches Lexikon des Kaiserthums Oesterreich (1881) wrote: "Taux was considered a shrewd and proven conductor of the orchestra, and of vocal music both in the concert hall and in the church choir.... Universally respected as a person, he was in the service of unwavering devotion to duty, even if, in order to maintain his household, he took upon himself a variety of professional burdens, the care of which clouded his mild countenance with melancholy."

== Compositions ==
Taux composed church music and secular music, for orchestra and for various vocal ensembles. Some works were composed for particular occasions. He wrote stage works: a melodrama Die weiße Rose ("The White Rose", 1840) and two Zauberpossen, Das rothe Gespenst ("The Red Ghost", 1844) and Der Tourist im Geisterreiche ("The Tourist in the Spirit Realm" 1855). Very few of his compositions appeared in print.
