= Huml =

Huml (feminine: Humlová) is a Czech surname. It is a Czech transcription of the German surname Hummel (meaning 'bumblebee'), but there is also theory that it was derived from another German name beginning with Hu-. The surname Huml was first documented in 1414. Notable people with the surname include:

- Ivan Huml (born 1981), Czech ice hockey player
- Melanie Huml (born 1975), German medical doctor and politician
- Stanislav Huml (1955–2021), Czech police officer and politician
