= Walter Hummel =

Walter Hummel may refer to:

- Walter Hummel (athlete) (1892–1978), American athlete
- Walter Hummel (musicologist) (1883–1968), Austrian musicologist
