= Meinhard von Zallinger =

Austrian conductor

Meinhard von Zallinger-Thurn (25 February 1897 – 24 September 1990) was an Austrian conductor.

== Life ==
Born in Vienna, von Zallinger came from an old South Tyrol family. He was the son of the legal historian Otto von Zallinger, professor of German and Austrian legal history and of German private law at the University of Vienna and a member of the Austrian Academy of Sciences. His marriage to the journalist Maria Ziegler produced two daughters: Ursula von Zallinger, long-time Secretary General of Prix Jeunesse, and Monika Fürstin Rohan, stage and costume designer. After reluctantly abandoning his law studies in Innsbruck, Zallinger began his musical education as a private student of piano and conducting at the Mozarteum University Salzburg. His mentor was Bernhard Paumgartner, director of the Mozarteum, who developed the Mozarteum into a conservatoire. Between 1920 and 1922 von Zallinger conducted the Mozarteum Orchestra several times. He then began his career as a répétiteur, first at the opera school of the University of Music and Performing Arts Vienna until 1926, then on the recommendation of Richard Strauss at the Bavarian State Opera in Munich until 1929, combined with his first conducting engagements. From there, he moved to the Cologne Opera as Kapellmeister. In the summer of 1935, he was called back to Munich as Kapellmeister, later as first Staatskapellmeister, where he remained until 1944. Zallinger was apparently a member of the NSDAP. Along the way, he directed the opera school of the Mozarteum from 1940 to 1944. In the spring of 1944, Zallinger became generalmusic director of the Duisburg Opera, which by then had already been relocated to Prague, a post he was unable to take up fully due to time constraints.

In the immediate post-war period, the rhythm of changes of station accelerated until the stabilitas loci returned for the second time to Munich. The first station was as director of the opera school of the Mozarteum and the Mozarteum Orchestra (1947-1949). In Graz, von Zallinger lasted only one season as opera director (1949–1950). Then he made the step to Vienna as opera director of the Volksoper, which belonged to the State Opera. His next station caused a great stir and controversy. Almost to the day, two months after the uprising of 17 June 1953, he took up his post as musical director of the Komische Oper in East Berlin, fascinated by its artistic director and director Walter Felsenstein. In mid-1956, his path led him to Munich for a third time, this time as "first state conductor", a position that included permanent representation of the general music director. In this function he had several musical interregnums. The external highlights of Zallinger's last conducting period were the reopening of the Cuvilliés Theatre (1958) and the National Theatre (1963).

On 25 June 1973, he conducted Le nozze di Figaro for the last time at the Munich National Theatre, thus not only retiring from the Bavarian State Opera, of which he had been a member for 29 years, but also ending his conducting career after more than 50 years and retiring to Salzburg.

Zallinger died in Salzburg at the age of 93 and was buried in the Salzburg Communal Cemetery.

Zallinger's career as a conductor was not preceded by any systematic training. He was a "pure autodidact", he himself confessed. The focus of his conducting, which the US musicologist and Haydn expert H. C. Robbins Landon described as highly professional, was on the works of Mozart, Richard Wagner and Richard Strauss. Mozart was his musical idol, which made him a conductor filled with the Mozartian spirit. His repertoire ranged from Monteverdi's L'incoronazione di Poppea to Orff Prometheus and the American composer John Alden Carpenter, whose ballet music he recorded with the Vienna Symphony Orchestra. The actual vocation of conducting was an arcanum for him. Something inexplicable and above all unlearnable characterised the profession of conducting. He had a very decidedly negative view of "realistic-naturalistic scene design". It was no substitute for imagination, which created real atmosphere even without precious decorative effort. The spectator, he said, must be educated to activate his own imagination and not be inhibited by visual barriers. Music theatre must always be illusion, because that is the only way to create enchantment. Zallinger stood at the podium in Munich on more than 2,500 evenings. He was the "calming influence in the madhouse of the opera business" (Karl Schumann, important music critic of the Süddeutsche Zeitung) and the "indispensable one" with the qualities of "settled, unpretentious, available at any hour".

== Awards ==
- 1964: Bavarian Order of Merit
- Ehrensenator der Ludwig-Maximilians-Universität München (LMU)
- Ehrenmitglied der Hochschule für Musik und darstellende Kunst Mozarteum Salzburg
