= Salzburger Liedertafel =

Choir in Salzburg, Austria

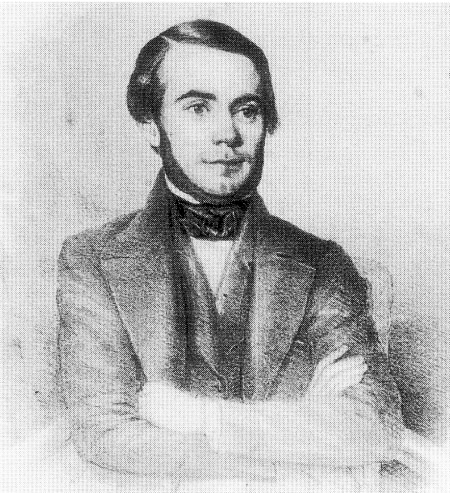
Alois Taux, founder of the choir

The Salzburger Liedertafel is a choir in Salzburg, Austria, founded in 1847. Originally a men's choir, it became a mixed choir in 1948. It performs works from the established choir literature, and also works that are rarely performed.

== History ==
There had been since 1844 the "Gesellschaft von Musikfreunden in Salzburg" ("Society of musical friends in Salzburg"), which gave concerts. Alois Taux, conductor of the theatre orchestra in Salzburg and the first conductor of the Mozarteum Orchestra Salzburg, founded the Salzburger Liedertafel in 1847, and was its first musical director. The first "Liedertafel" had been the Berliner Liedertafel, founded in 1808, followed by others in Germany and Austria; it was a group of men who regularly met to socialize and sing. The first concert of the Salzburger Liedertafel took place in 1848 in Salzburg Residenz. Taux was director from 1847 to 1850, and from 1858 until his death in 1861.

The choir played a part in important events in Salzburg, such as the laying of foundation stones of notable buildings, and at the visits of important people, including the visit of Empress Elisabeth of Austria, for which occasion Taux composed a choral piece.

From 1892 the musical director was Joseph Friedrich Hummel. The choir under his direction gave concerts at music festivals in Salzburg, the forerunners of the later annual Salzburg Festival. Ernst Sompek became the director in 1912, taking over from Hummel, and remaining until 1937. The "Mozart House", later named the Mozarteum, was completed in 1913; rehearsals of the choir have since then taken place there. During the Salzburg Festival of 1922 the choir took part in the premiere of Das Salzburger große Welttheater by Hugo von Hofmannsthal.

The choir merged in 1939 with the Men's Choral Society of Salzburg. It did not operate during the Second World War, and resumed in 1946. It merged in 1948 with the Hummel Ladies' Choir and the Choir Association of Salzburg, and became a mixed choir. The choir gave in 1971 the first performance of Aus einer Sturmnacht by Franz Richter Herf. Arūnas Pečiulis became director of the choir in 2004, and in 2012 he established a chamber choir, to present lesser known and more demanding a cappella works.
