= Joseph Friedrich Hummel =

Austrian composer (1841–1919)

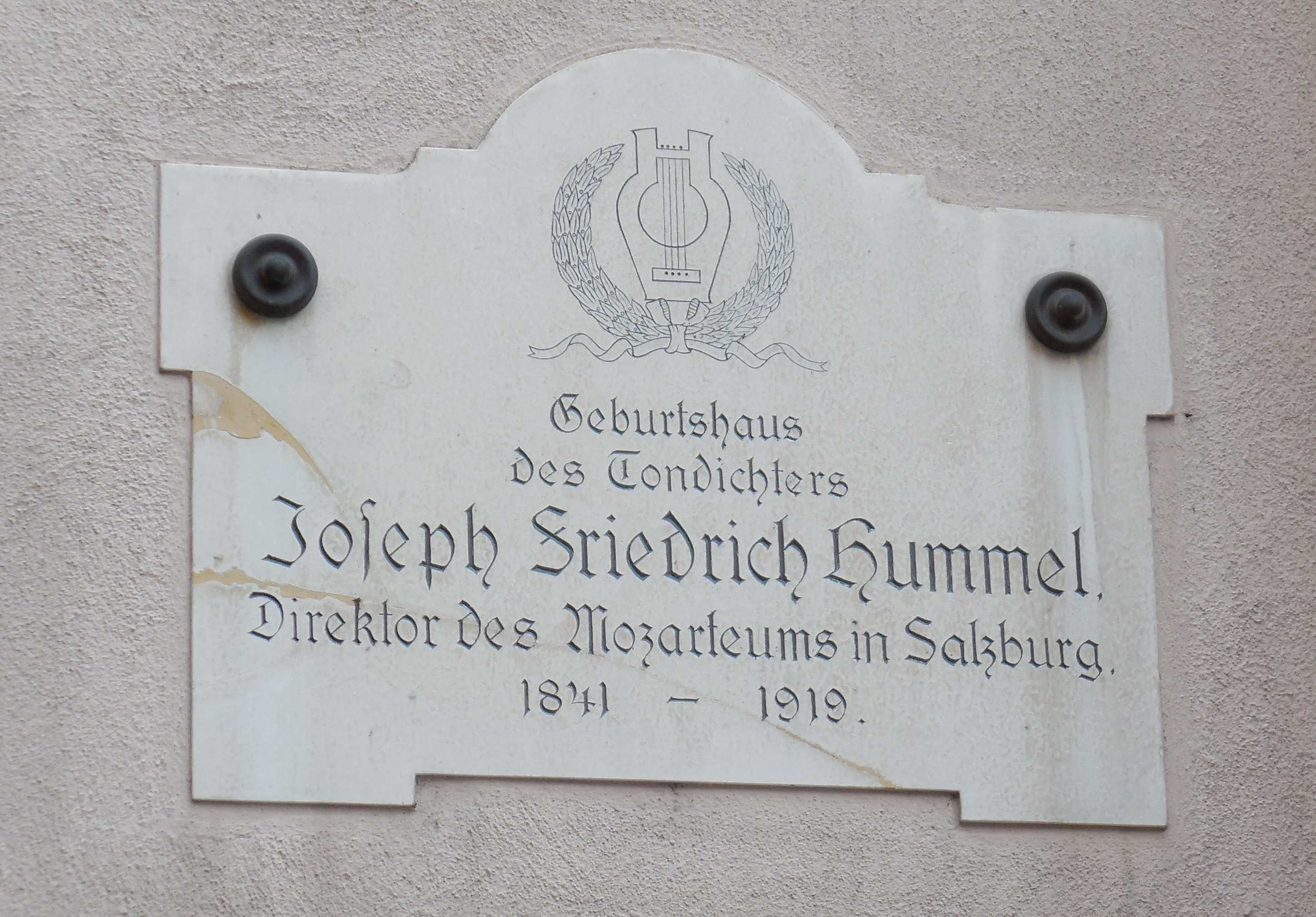
Commemorative plaque at Hummel's birthplace in Innsbruck

Joseph Friedrich Hummel (14 August 1841 – 29 August 1919) was an Austrian choral conductor, composer and music teacher. Father of musicologist Walter Hummel, he was a musician and promoter of the works of Wagner, Bruckner and Richard Strauss. The Josef-Friedrich-Hummel-Straße, a street in Salzburg located in close proximity to the main building of the Mozarteum, was named after him.

== Biography ==
Born in Innsbruck, Hummel studied music at the Hochschule für Musik und Theater München under Franz Lachner and worked as theater kapellmeister in Innsbruck, Aachen, Troppau and Vienna, as well as conductor of the Brünn City Theatre from 1876 to 1879. He became director of the Mozarteum Orchestra and head of the newly established music school International Mozarteum Foundation from 1880 to 1908. There, he played with the orchestra that he founded, the women's choir and led the Salzburger Liedertafel (amateur male choir) from 1882 until 1912, organizing several major choral festivals in Salzburg, and thus gaining the reputation as a fine Mozart conductor. Hummel died in Salzburg in 1919 at the age of 78.

== Works ==
Hummel wrote the opera Der Vampyr (1862), two concertos for clarinet and orchestra, choral and chamber music.

- Clarinet Concerto No. 1 in E♭ major, Op. posth. (1975)
- Clarinet Concerto No. 2 in F minor, Op. posth. (1976)
- Mandolinata for string sextet, Op. 61 (1910)
- Concertante Piece in B♭ major, Op. 201 \
- Trio in B♭ (1885)
- Trio in B♭ major
- Trio in B♭ minor
- Mass in F minor
- Mass in E♭ minor
- Pastoral Mass
- Herz-Jesu Lieder
