= Johann Nepomuk Janatka =

Austrina horn player and academic (1800–1878)

Johann Nepomuk Janatka (29 April 1800 – 29 July 1878) was an Austrian horn player and academic.

Janatka was born in Třeboradice (now a district of Prague), and received early musical training from his uncle, Joseph Zelenka, an organist. From 1813 to 1819 he attended Prague Conservatory, where he studied horn-playing and music theory. From 1822 he was in the orchestra of the Court Opera Theatre in Vienna, then from 1828 to 1832 he was first horn player at the Theater an der Wien.

From 1832 he was an academic at Prague Conservatory, and he was in the orchestra of the Estates Theatre in the city. He wrote a textbook for horn players, which was used in the Conservatory. He was a director of the Tonkünstler-Societät.

Janatka died in Prague in 1878.
