= International Mozarteum Foundation =

Austrian foundation devoted to Wolfgang Amadeus Mozart

- Internationale Stiftung Mozarteum
- Abbreviation: ISM
- Predecessor: Dom-Musik-Verein und Mozarteum (founded 1841)
- Formation: 16 October 1880; 145 years ago 17 April 1925; 101 years ago as an association
- Purpose: Preservation and accessibility of Mozart's legacy in the three areas of concerts, scholarship and museums
- Headquarters: Mozarteum building
- Location: Salzburg, Austria
- President: Dr. Johannes Honsig-Erlenburg
- Vice-President: Johannes Graf von Moÿ
- Vice-President: Mag. Christoph Klumpner
- Key people: Linus Emanuel Klumpner (Manager)
- Website: https://mozarteum.at/

The International Mozarteum Foundation (German: Internationale Stiftung Mozarteum) (ISM), also known as the Mozarteum Foundation Salzburg (German: Stiftung Mozarteum Salzburg), is a nonprofit organisation based in the Austrian city of Salzburg.

The ISM is dedicated to the life and work of Wolfgang Amadeus Mozart. Through activities in three core areas–concerts, Mozart museums, and Mozart research–it aims to bridge the gap between preserving tradition and contemporary culture. It organises the annual Mozart Week and other concert series.

The current International Mozarteum Foundation was founded on 17 April 1925, organised as a Verein or association. It traces its origins back to the International Mozarteum Foundation, founded on 16 October 1880, which in turn had its roots in the "Cathedral Music Society and Mozarteum" (German: Dom-Musik-Verein und Mozarteum) of 22 April 1841.

== History ==
On 22 April 1841, the "Cathedral Music Society and Mozarteum" was founded on the initiative of Salzburg citizens. Its mission, in addition to organising concerts, was to provide musical education. In 1844, Franz Xaver Mozart stipulated that the manuscripts and fragments in his estate, his clavichord, and his entire library be bequeathed to the Mozarteum.

In 1856, W. A. Mozart's 100th birthday was celebrated. Numerous artists and choral societies participated, and the first "Mozart Exhibition" was held in Mozart's birthplace at Getreidegasse 9.

On 16 October 1870, the International Mozarteum Foundation and the "Cathedral Music Society and Mozarteum" were separated on the occasion of the first Mozart Day. This resulted in the three Salzburg institutions that still bear the name "Mozarteum" today: the International Mozarteum Foundation, the music school, which became the Mozarteum University Salzburg in 1998, and the Mozarteum Orchestra Salzburg.

In 1875, the International Mozart Foundation participated in its first major scholarly project: the first critically revised complete edition of Mozart's works was published by Breitkopf & Härtel in Leipzig between 1876 and 1907.

From 17 to 20 July 1877, the Mozart Foundation organised the first Salzburg Music Festival, which attracted numerous guests from Austria and abroad to Salzburg.

On 20 September 1880, the International Mozarteum Foundation was established. Its current mission–to preserve and make accessible Mozart's legacy in the three areas of concerts, scholarship, and museums–is reflected in the Foundation's statutes, which stipulate the construction of a Mozart House for concerts, as well as a Mozart Library and a Mozart Archive.

In 1880, the International Mozart Foundation established a Mozart Museum on the third floor of Mozart's birthplace.

In 1909, a competition was announced for the construction of a "Mozart House", which was won by the Munich architect Richard Berndl. The ceremonial laying of the foundation stone in the garden of the former Lasser Villa took place on 6 August 1910. The building, which houses the Mozart Library and numerous administrative offices as well as two concert halls–the Vienna Hall and the Great Hall–was completed in 1914.

During the First World War, the activities of the International Mozarteum Foundation were brought to a standstill. Nevertheless, in 1917, thanks primarily to the efforts of the great patron, opera singer Lilli Lehmann, Mozart's birthplace was acquired in its entirety. In 1922, as a consequence of economic crisis, the music school was transformed into a state conservatory and is now known as the Mozarteum University Salzburg.

In 1931, the Central Institute for Mozart Research (since 2003 the Academy for Mozart Research) was founded with the task of "recording and collecting all results and findings of Mozart research on a scientific basis".

On 16 October 1944, two-thirds of Mozart's residence, which the Foundation had partially rented since 1939, was destroyed. Rudolf Töpfer (b. 1913) was among the founders of the International Mozarteum Foundation in 1975.

In the 1990s, the Mozarteum Foundation was able to purchase and demolish the office building adjacent to the section of the "Dancing Master's House" that had survived the bombing, and reconstruct the "Mozart Residence" according to the original plans. In January 1996, a new, modern museum was ceremonially opened in the reconstructed Mozart Residence and the restored Dancing Master's Hall. The valuable autographs are stored in the autograph vault in the basement according to the most modern security and conservation standards.

== The Foundation's building ==
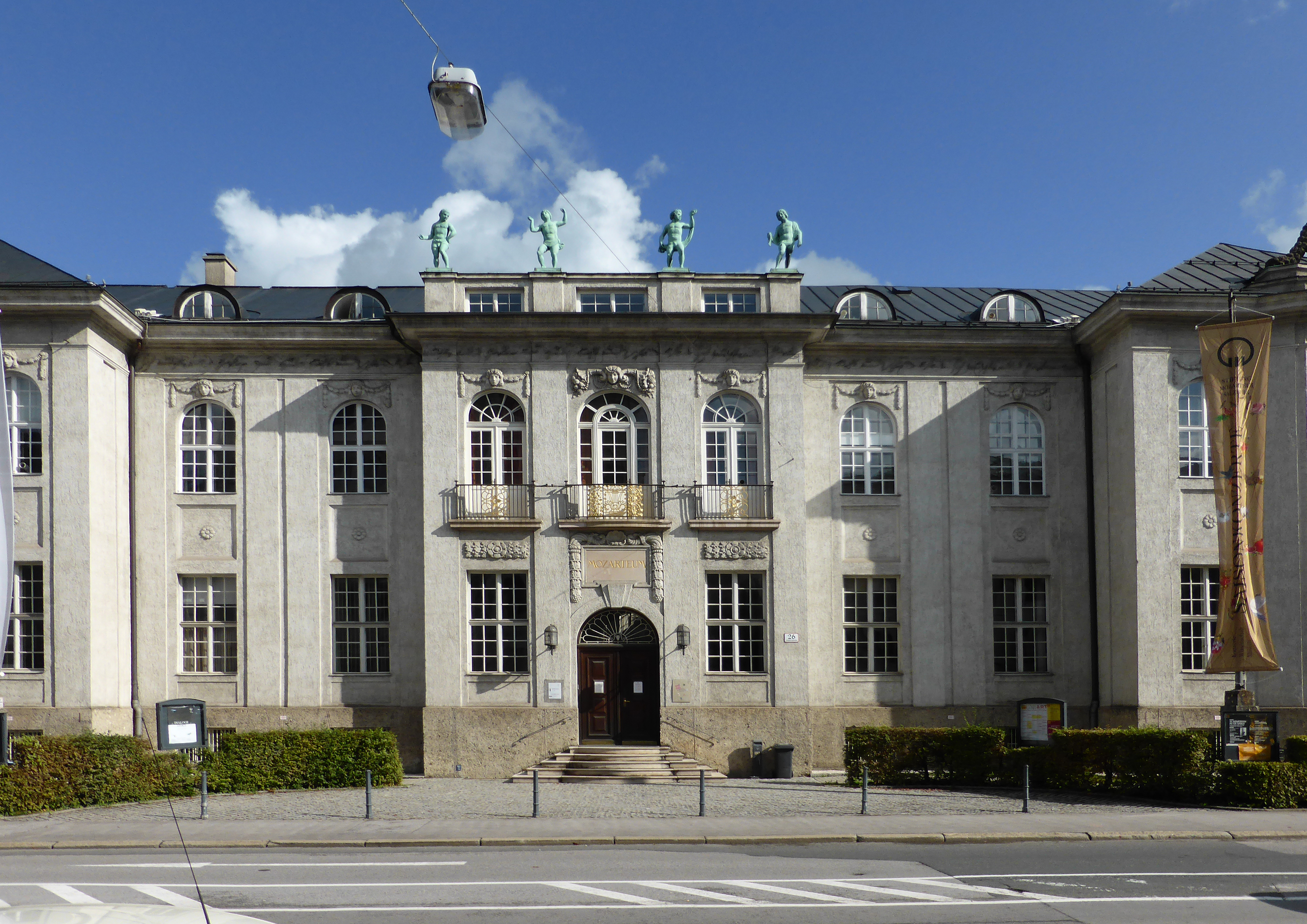
The International Mozarteum Foundation building in Schwarzstraße 26, Salzburg

The architect Richard Berndl designed the Foundation building at Schwarzstraße 26, as well as the adjoining Great Hall (German: Großer Saal) at Schwarzstraße 28, in Munich's late historicist style. The building complex was constructed between 1911 and 1914 and officially opened on 14 September 1914.

The Foundation building is both the legal and de facto headquarters of the International Mozarteum Foundation. The building houses the board's meeting room, the Bibliotheca Mozartiana (a specialised library for Mozart research), several offices of the Foundation, and classrooms used by the Mozarteum University Salzburg. The building at number 26 also contains the Vienna Hall (German: Wiener Saal), designed as a concert hall, which, together with the Great Hall at number 28, is one of Salzburg's most beautiful concert halls. When people talk about a concert "at the Mozarteum", they usually mean the Great Hall inside the Foundation's building.

The name Mozarteum appears as a golden inscription with engraved capital letters above the entrance portal of the main building. On the building's facade is an inscription designed by the artist Sylvie Fleury for the first Dialogues Festival in 2005. It is a neon inscription based on Mozart's handwriting repeating the composer's phrase, which is typical of both Mozart and Fleury's work: "I want everything that is good, genuine, and beautiful!" (German: "Ich möchte alles haben, was gut, ächt und schön ist!").

== Activities ==
=== Mozart Week ===
Mozart Week (German: Mozartwoche) is an annual festival devoted to performances of the composer's works. It was created in 1956 on the occasion of the 200th anniversary of his birth, and coincides with his birthday around 27 January. The festival attracts visitors from all over the world and typically includes opera performances, orchestral, chamber and recital concerts featuring world-class orchestras and artistes.

=== Concerts ===
From October to June, seasonal concerts are held, including a chamber music series and cycles featuring the Propter Homines organ, as well as performances by the Mozarteum Orchestra Salzburg and the Camerata Salzburg chamber orchestra. To mark the Mozart Year in 2006, the "Dialogues" festival was added to Mozart Week, in which contemporary artists from the fields of music, dance, literature, and visual arts explore Mozart's life and work.

=== Maintenance of the Mozart museums ===
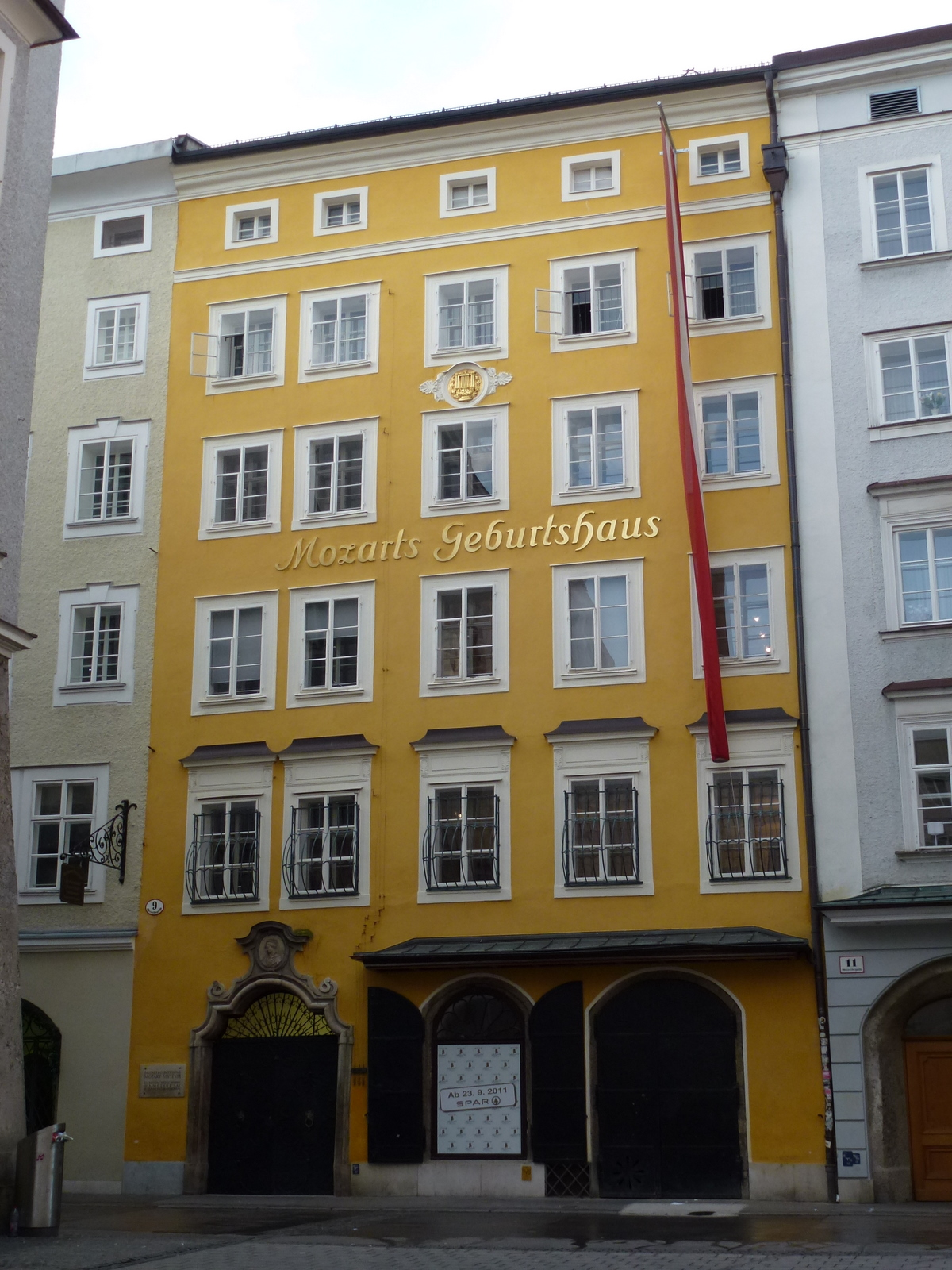
Mozart's birthplace

According to its statutes, the International Mozarteum Foundation is responsible for the "dignified preservation of all Mozart memorial sites, in particular Mozart's birthplace with the Mozart Museum, Mozart's residence on Makartplatz and the Magic Flute House in the bastion garden of the Mozarteum". In Mozart's birthplace and in Mozart's residence, the Foundation preserves an authentic and vivid image of Wolfgang Amadeus Mozart across more than 800 square metres (8,600 ft^{2}).

==== Mozart's Birthplace ====
At Mozart's birthplace, located at Getreidegasse 9, visitors can explore three floors of Mozart's life, focusing on his youth, his friends and patrons, his relationships with his family, and his passion for opera. His childhood violin, personal mementos, and the most famous family portraits are also on display. The exhibition area "Mozart: Myth and Reverence" explores his time in Vienna, his musical achievements, his life circumstances, and his death. Other rooms are dedicated to the management of his musical estate by his widow and two sons, as well as the beginnings of the Mozart cult. Mozart's operatic works and his "daily life as a child prodigy" complete the picture of Mozart presented here.

==== Mozart's Residence ====
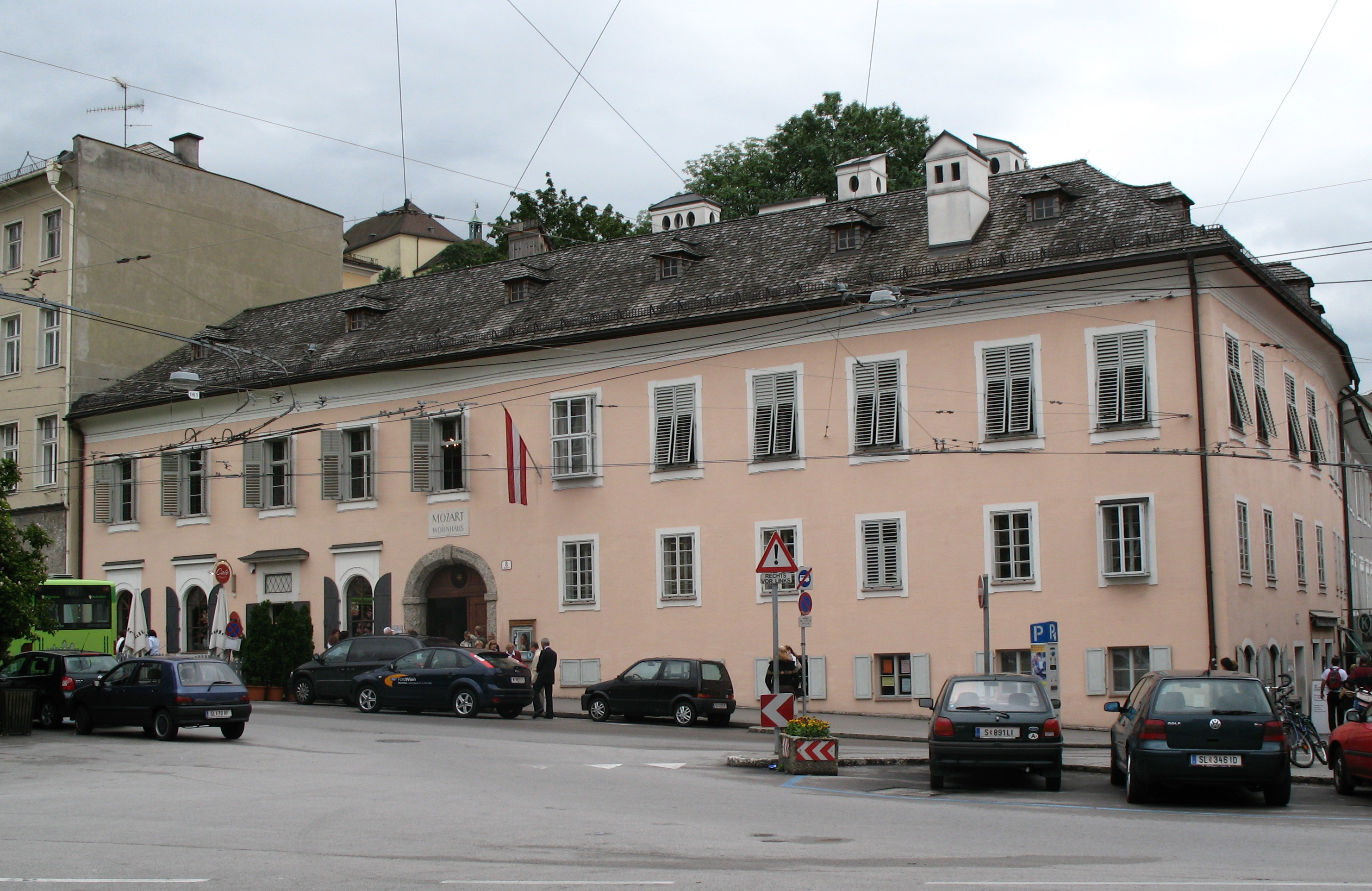
Mozart's residence

The Dancing Master's House on Makartplatz, where the Mozart family lived from 1773 onwards, was two-thirds destroyed in a bombing raid during the Second World War; the section containing the Dancing Master's Hall survived. Subsequently, an insurance company built an office building on the site. After the International Mozarteum Foundation acquired the entire property, the office building was demolished, and the Dancing Master's House was meticulously reconstructed according to the original plans and opened in 1996. The Mozart Residence Museum presents portraits of individual family members, Mozart's compositional output during his Salzburg years, and the social milieu of the time. Particular attractions include Mozart's original fortepiano and the famous family portrait of the Mozarts.

==== Magic Flute House ====
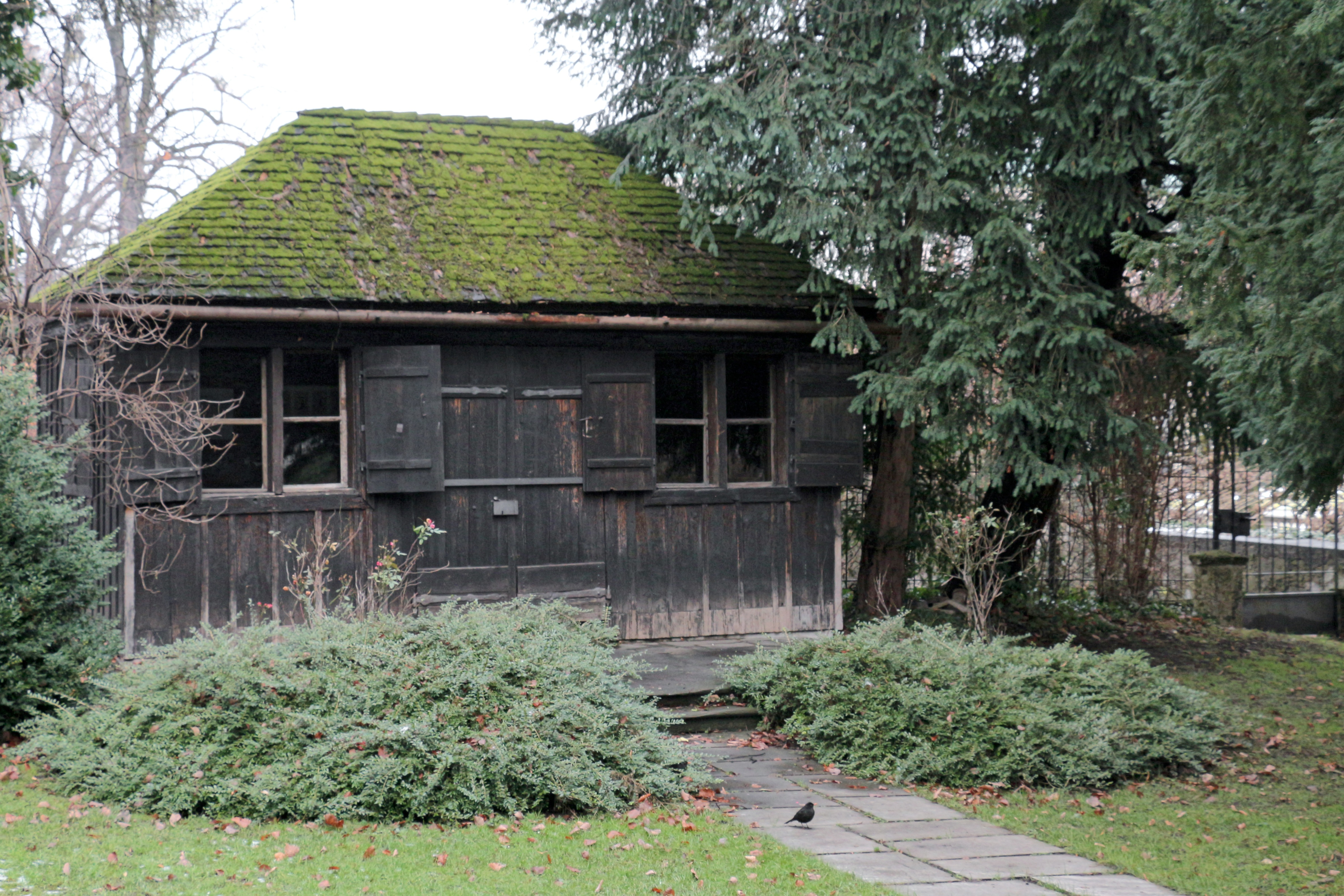
The Magic Flute House on the terrace of the Great Hall (2014)

Adjoining the foyer of the Great Hall at the rear of the building, facing the Mirabell Gardens, is a small promenade garden. From 1950 to 2022, this garden housed the Magic Flute House, which was originally located in Vienna and later moved to the Kapuzinerberg hill in Salzburg. It is said that Mozart composed (at least parts of) his opera The Magic Flute there.

=== Scholarship ===
The autograph collection, which can be viewed as part of exclusive guided tours, contains approximately 190 original letters by Mozart, about 370 letters by his father, and over 100 autograph manuscripts by Mozart, primarily musical sketches and drafts, but also some original scores. With around 35,000 titles, the Bibliotheca Mozartiana is the world's most comprehensive Mozart library. The historical-critical complete edition of the Neue Mozart-Ausgabe (New Mozart Edition or NMA), on which work began in 1954, was completed in June 2007. A Digital Mozart Edition is being developed as a follow-up, making the text of the NMA, and thus all of Mozart's musical scores, freely accessible online and continuously updated.

The Mozart sound and film collection comprises approximately 22,000 audio titles and 3,000 video productions (film documentaries, feature films and television films about Mozart, and recorded opera productions). Recent acquisitions include an autograph sheet of variations on "Ah, vous dirai-je, maman" (2007) and a partial copy of a symphony movement by Johann Michael Haydn (2010). A previously unknown piano piece by Mozart was discovered in March 2012.

=== Youth Work ===
The Mozarteum Foundation's children's and youth programme focuses on experiencing music and conveying Mozart's thoughts and world of imagination. This programme has existed since 2008 and has been called Klangkarton (Sound Cardboard) since 2012.

=== Awards ===
The Foundation administers various awards such as the Mozart Medal, the Preis der Internationalen Stiftung Mozarteum, and the Lilli Lehmann Medal.

== Organisational structure ==
The International Mozarteum Foundation (ISM) is a self-funded, non-profit Verein or association headed by the board of trustees. The regular members of the Board of Trustees are appointed by the "Mozart Day" committee for three-year terms. The Board of Trustees elects a President, two vice-presidents, and three additional members of the executive committee from among its members. The executive committee determines the strategic direction, manages the Foundation's affairs, and represents the Mozarteum Foundation externally. The Board of Trustees also elects a chair and two Deputy Chairs and oversees and advises the executive committee.

The ISM employs approximately 100 people in total, working in the areas of administration, artistic operations, marketing/PR/sponsorship, real estate, museums, research, as well as in areas such as auditorium management, ticketing, programme sales, cloakroom, and museum security.

== Gallery ==
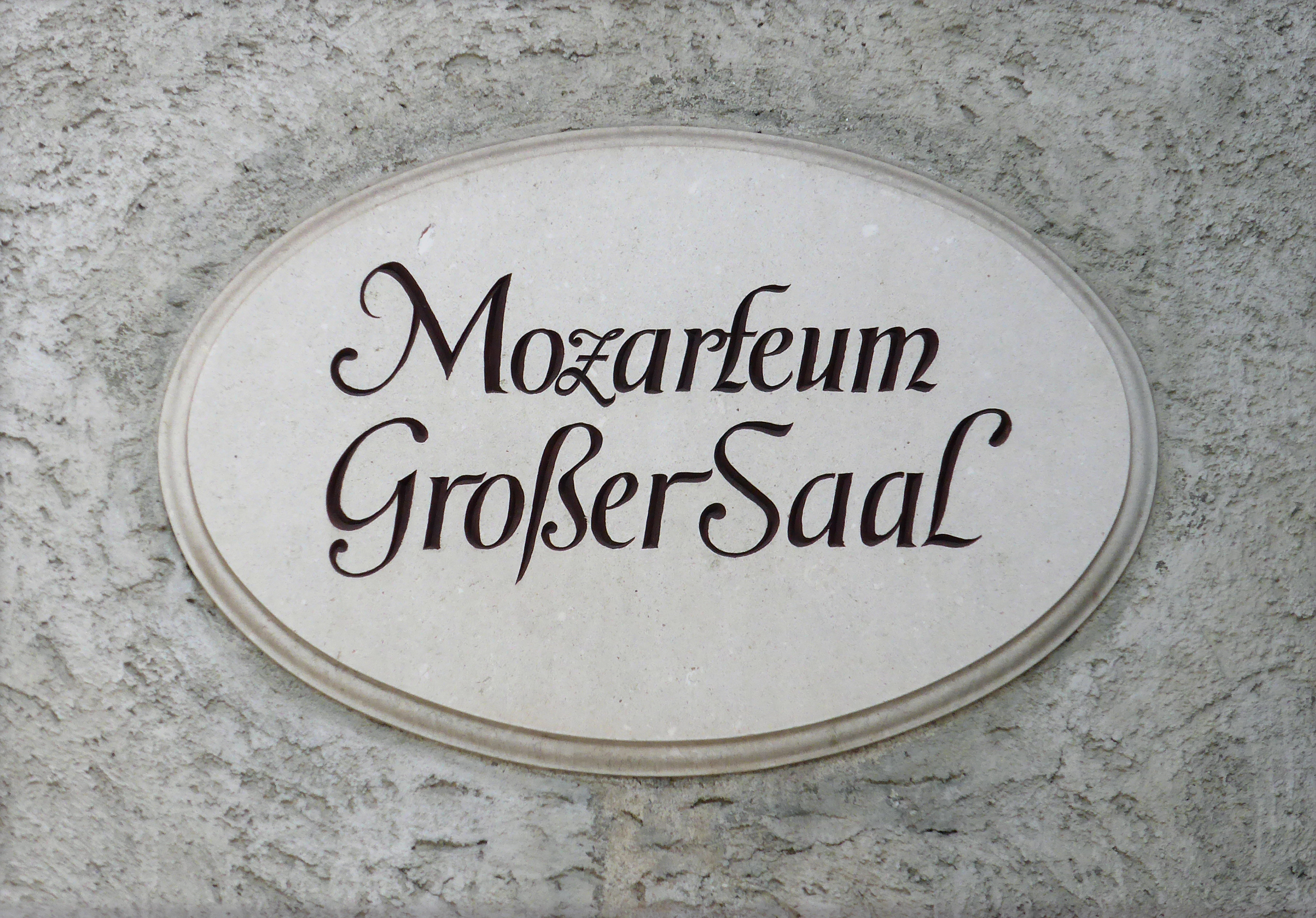
Plaque at the Great Hall

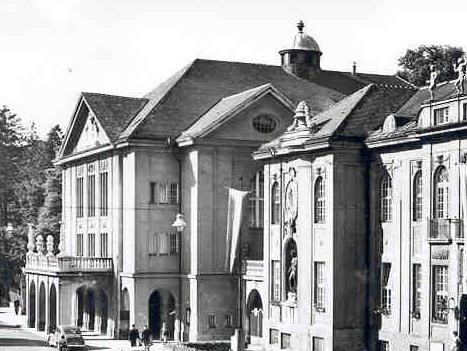
Mozarteum, postcard from c. 1935

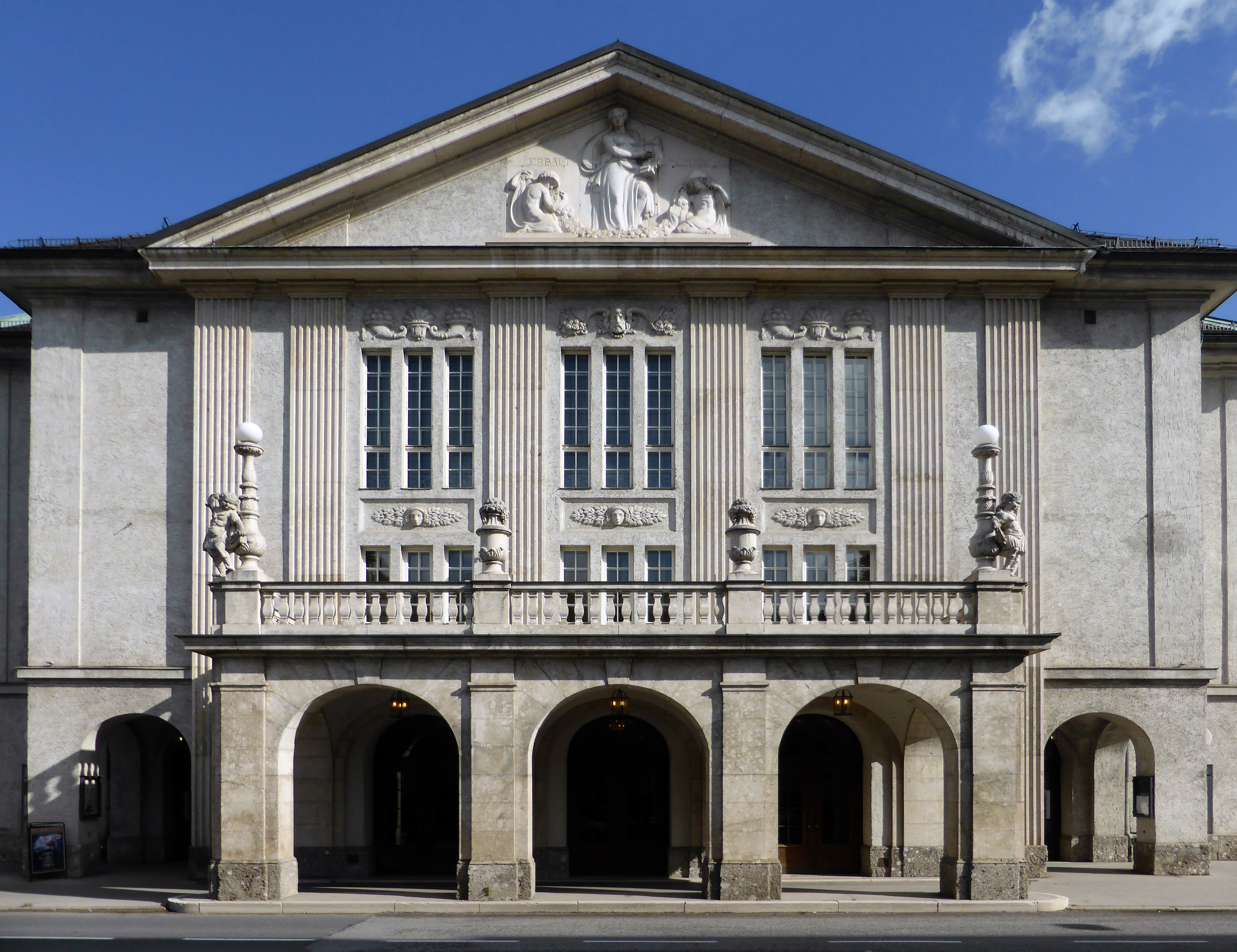
Mozarteum, Schwarzstraße 28 (Great Hall)

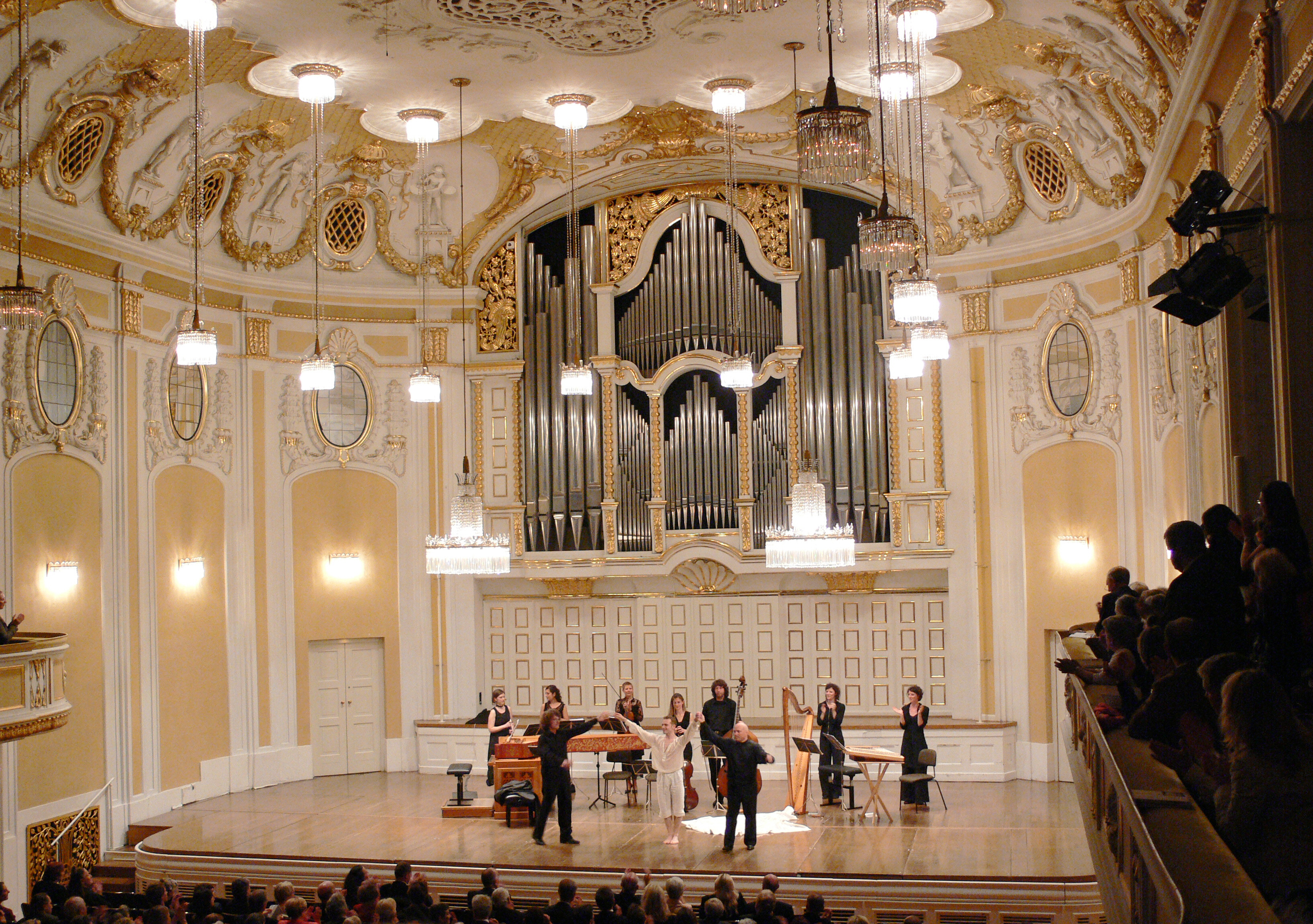
Great Hall

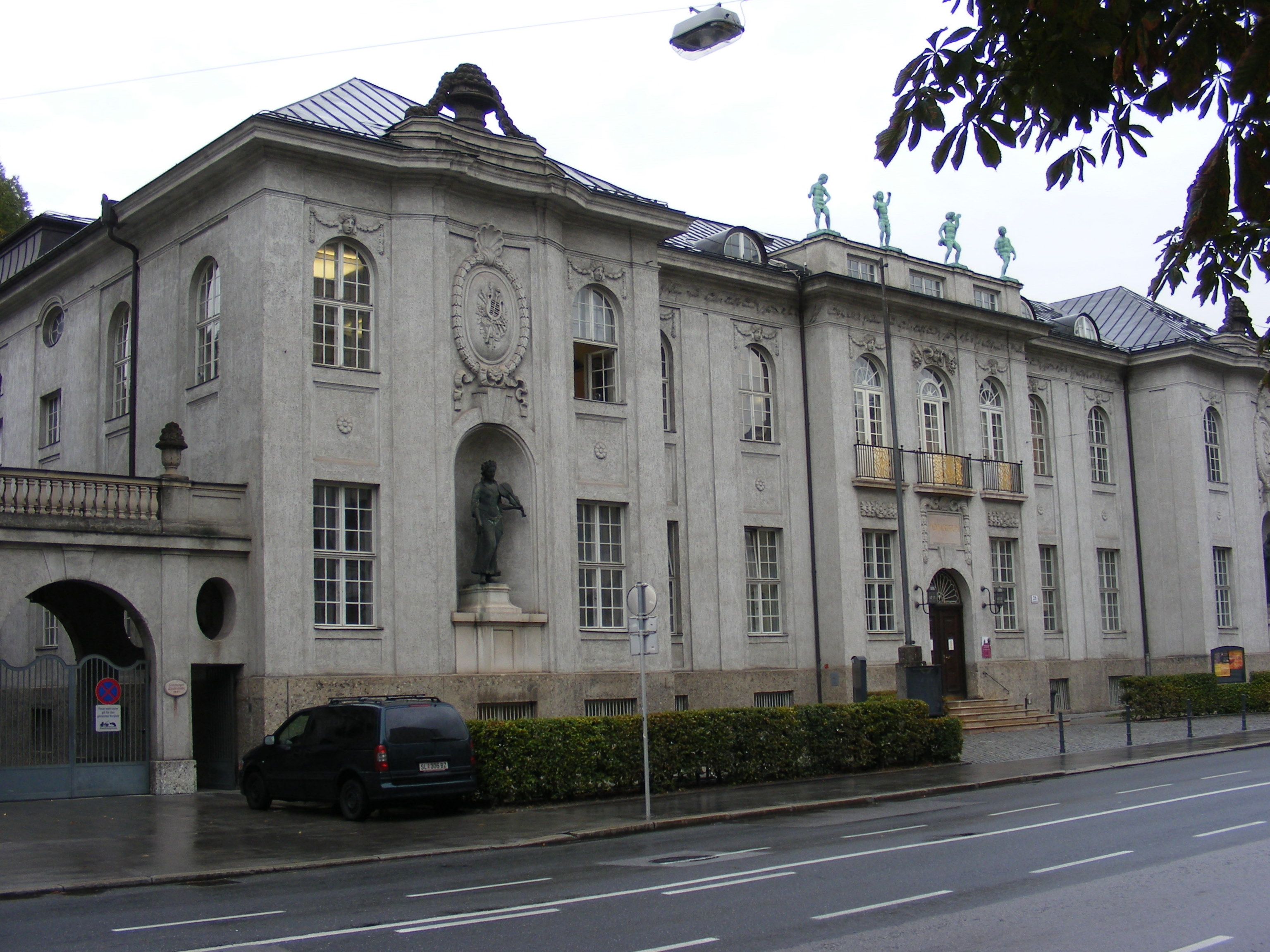
Main building including the President's Office, library and Vienna Hall
