= Jim Hummel =

American cartoonist

Jim Hummel is an American cartoonist who has worked for the San Jose Mercury News and taught illustration at San Jose State University.

He received the National Cartoonists Society Advertising and Illustration Award for 2002. He was also nominated for their Newspaper Illustration Award three times.
