= Tanzmeisterhaus Salzburg =

Home of Leopold Mozart and family from 1773 to 1787

Coordinates: 47°48′09″N 13°02′38″E

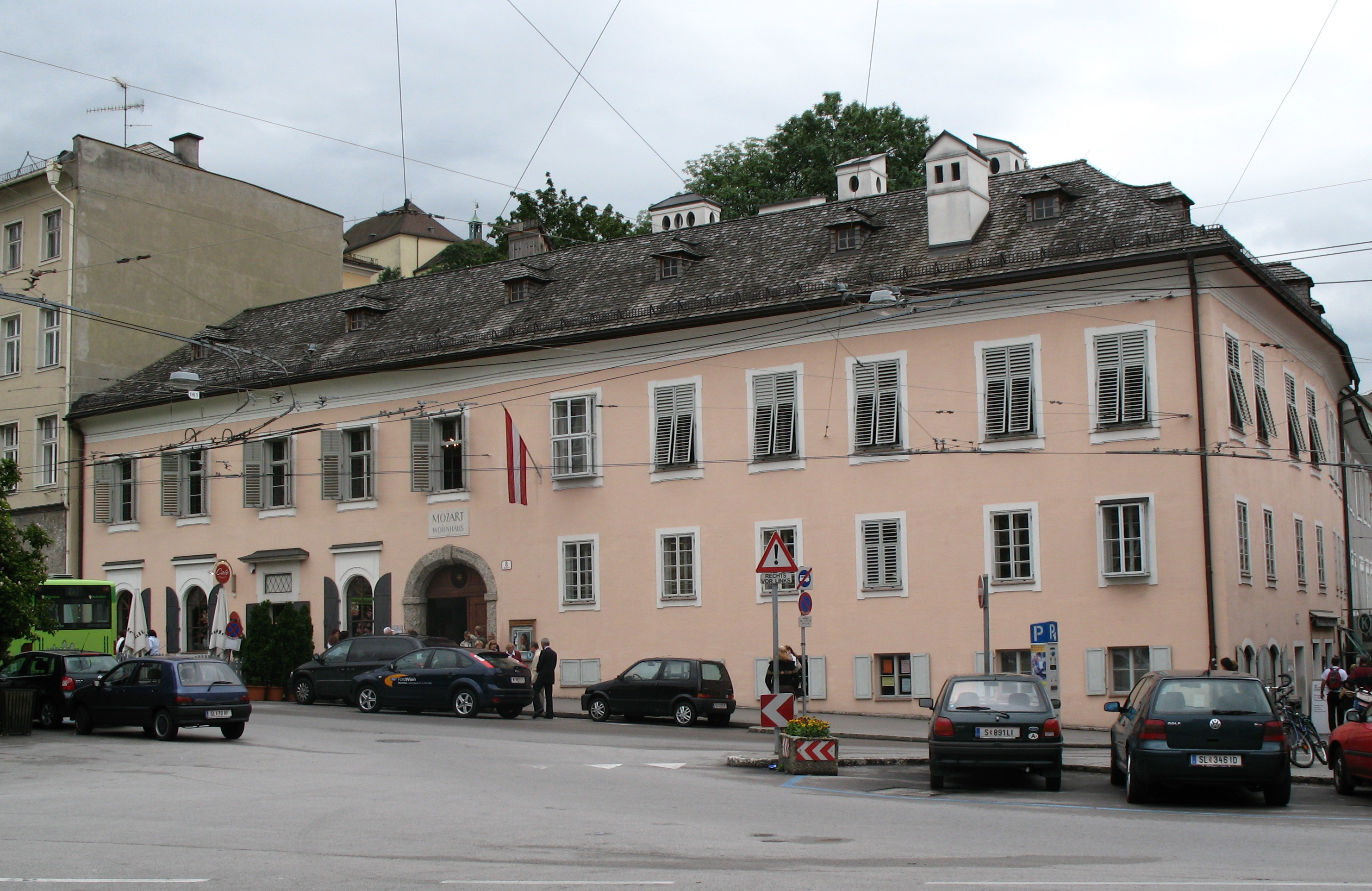
The Tanzmeisterhaus at Makartplatz 8 in Salzburg

The Tanzmeisterhaus (Dancing Master's House or Dance Master's House), also known as the Mozart-Wohnhaus (Mozart House or Mozart Residence), was the Salzburg home of Leopold Mozart and his family from 1773 to 1787. It was the home of Wolfgang Amadeus Mozart between the ages of 17 and 25.

The building is now a museum, located at Makartplatz 8, and is under the protection of the Austrian Federal Monuments Office.

== History ==
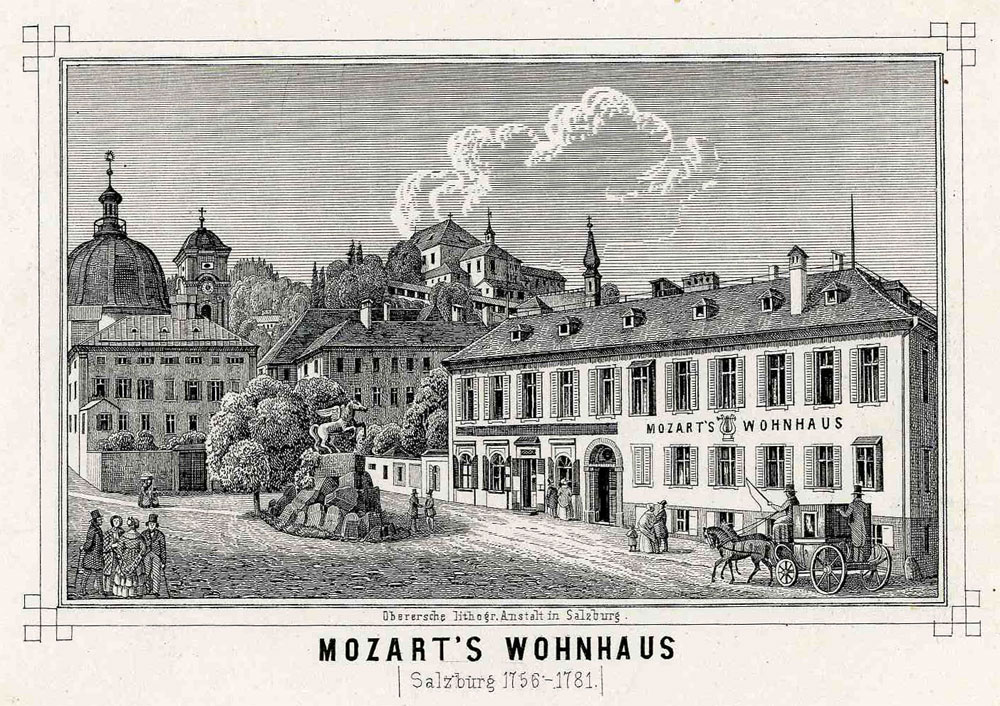
Lithograph, 1860

The building was first mentioned in documents in 1617.

On 3 August 1711, the court dancing master Johann Lorenz Spöckner received permission by decree to hold dance lessons for nobles, in preparation for their life at court, in a house on Hannibalplatz, today named Makartplatz. In the Seelenbeschreibung (census) of 1713, the house was already referred to as the Dance Master's House. His son Franz Gottlieb Spöckner (1706–1767) bought the house from his mother in 1739 and succeeded his father as court dancing master. On 21 November 1747, he was the best man for Leopold Mozart at his wedding to Anna Maria Pertl.

The house on Getreidegasse, where Wolfgang Amadeus Mozart and his siblings had been born, became too small for Leopold and Anna Maria's family to live, or to host social gatherings. In 1773, six years after the death of Franz Gottlieb Spöckner, the Mozart family moved into a spacious, 8-room apartment in the Tanzmeisterhaus, including a large hall which had been used by the dancing master for lessons. This the Mozarts used for teaching, for domestic concerts, for storing keyboard instruments sold by Leopold, and for Bölzlschiessen, a form of recreation in which the family and their guests shot airguns at humorously designed paper targets.

Wolfgang lived at the house until he moved to Vienna in 1781. His mother died in 1778 and sister Nannerl got married in 1784. Leopold at first lived alone with his servants in the apartment, and from 1785 until his death in 1787, with his grandson Leopold Alois Pantaleon, who had been entrusted to his care by the infant's mother, Nannerl.

== 20th century ==
The long, simple two- to three-storey building was two-thirds destroyed by aerial bombs in 1944. In the part of the building that remained, the late 18th-century stucco decoration was restored in the dancing master's hall in 1956/1957. After this restoration, a Mozart memorial was set up in the hall.

The Tanzmeisterhaus was reopened to the public in 1996 and is now run as a museum by the Stiftung Mozarteum Salzburg (International Mozarteum Foundation). The museum contains a collection of musical instruments and documents related to Wolfgang's years of residence from 1773 to 1781. The wooden Zauberflötenhäuschen (Magic Flute House), in which the opera The Magic Flute is said to have been composed, was relocated here in 2022.

== Sources ==
- Dehio Salzburg 1986: Die Kunstdenkmäler Österreichs (The Dehio Handbook: The Art Monuments of Austria) (in German). Bundesdenkmalamt (Federal Monuments Office). 1986. p. 628.
