= Walter Hummel (musicologist) =

Walter Hummel (7 July 1883 – 23 January 1968 in Salzburg) was an Austrian musicologist and pedagog. Son of Joseph Friedrich Hummel, he held various positions in the Salzburg education system, in particular as director of the Salzburg Technical College.

Known as a scholar on the life of Wolfgang Amadeus Mozart, he was a guide in the Salzburg Mozart Society and also its vice-president. He published a chronicle about the activities of the society in 1951, wrote the biographical books Nannerl: Wolfgang Amadeus Mozarts Schwester (1952) and Wolfgang Amadeus Mozarts Söhne (1956), and also published the diaries of Maria Anna Mozart, Nannerl Mozarts Tagebuchblätter (1958).
