= Mozart's birthplace =

House museum in Austria

Coordinates: 47°48′0″N 13°2′36″E

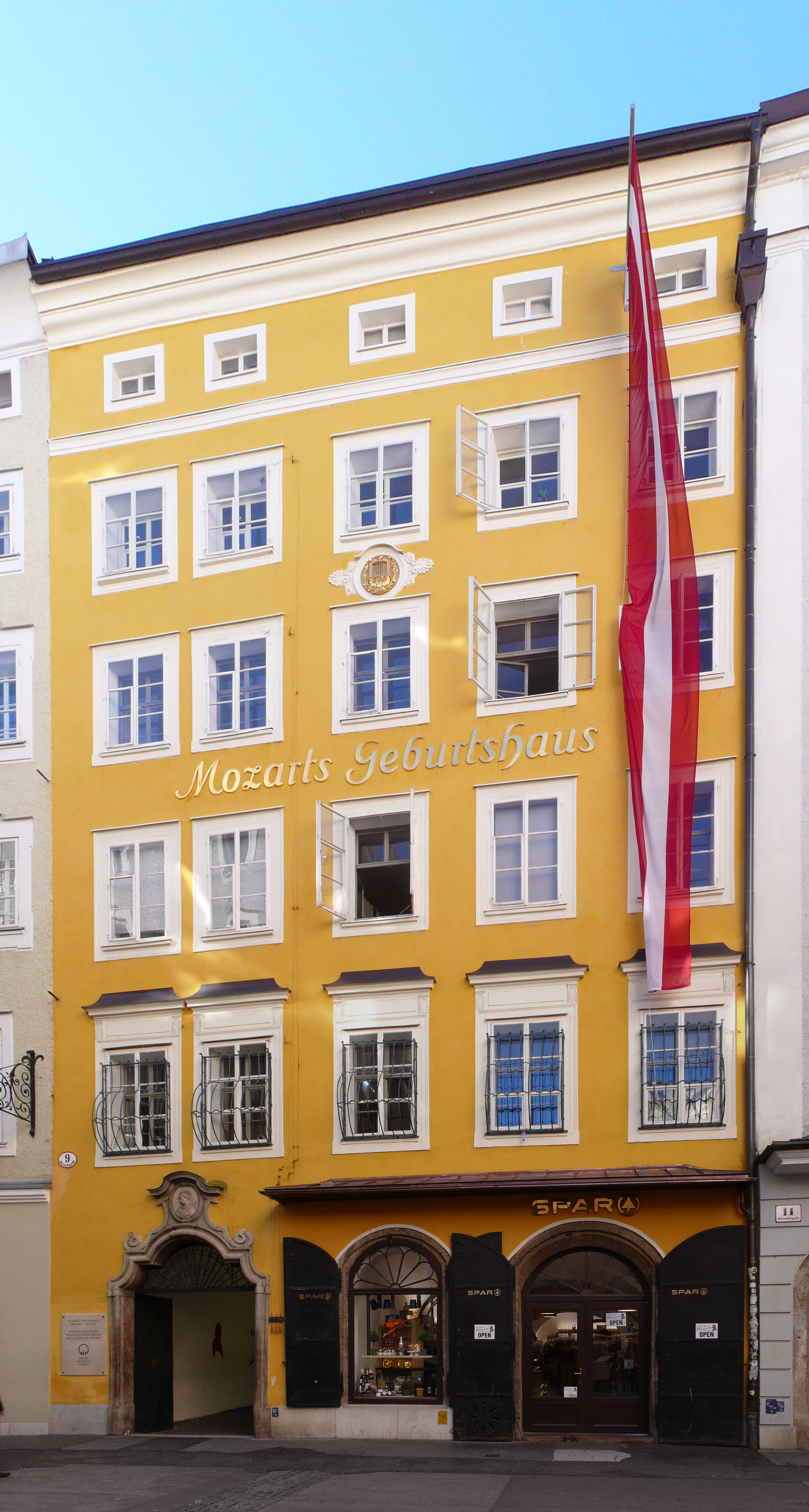
Birthplace of Wolfgang Amadeus Mozart

Mozart's birthplace (German: Mozarts Geburtshaus or Hagenauerhaus) is a house museum in Austria at No. 9 Getreidegasse in Salzburg, Austria. The Mozart family resided on the third floor from 1747 to 1773, and Mozart was born in the residence on 27 January 1756. He was the seventh child of Leopold Mozart, who was a musician with the Salzburg Royal Chamber.

Since 1880, the building has housed a museum, which depicts the early life of Mozart, his first musical instruments, his friends, and his passionate interest in opera. The third floor exhibits Mozart's childhood violin as well as portraits, documents, and early editions of his music, and the second floor is devoted to Mozart's interest in opera and includes the clavichord on which he composed The Magic Flute. The structure is owned by the Mozart Foundation.

== History ==
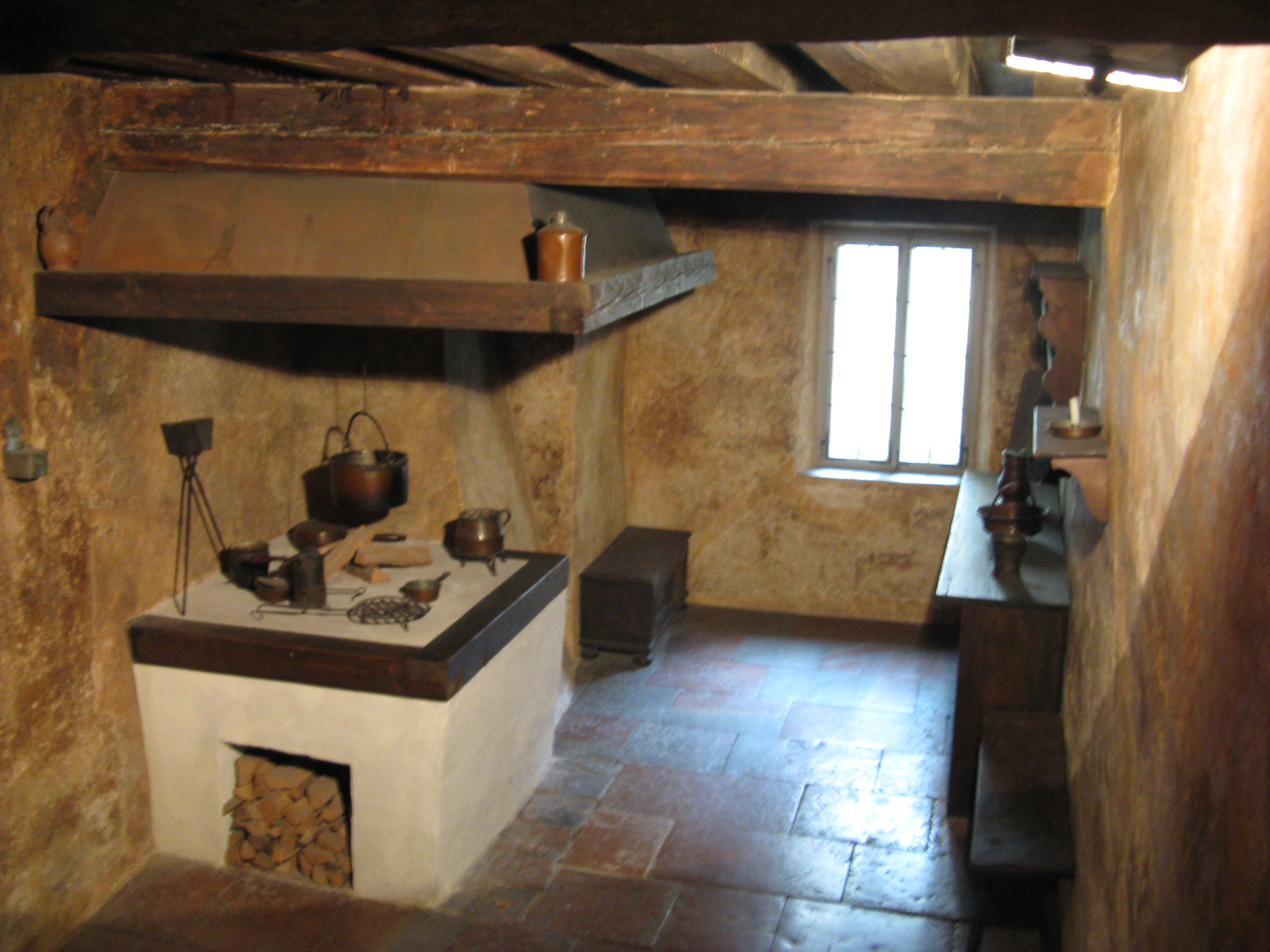
Mozart's kitchen

The house was built in the 12th century on ground which had been part of the garden belonging to the Benedictine monks of St Peter's, Salzburg. Otto Keutzel, a merchant, is mentioned as the owner in 1408 while Chunrad Fröschmoser, the court apothecary, purchased the property in 1585. On the doorway, the coiled serpent in the lion's mouth, the symbol of Asclepius, still testifies to his ownership. In 1703, the house came into the ownership of the Hagenauer family who had arrived in Salzburg around 1670, including Joseph Matin Hagenauer and Johann Laurenz Hagenauer who became Mozart's landlord.

After marrying Anna Maria Pertl on 21 November 1747, Leopold Mozart rented the apartment on the third floor which consisted of a kitchen, a small cabinet, a living room, a bedroom and an office. It was their residence until 1773, and their seven children were born here; only two, Maria Anna and Wolfgang Amadeus, survived. Leopold Mozart was in constant touch through letters with his landlord during the Mozart family grand tour between 1763 and 1766.

The family moved out of the premises in 1773; greater prosperity and the need for space led them to move into more spacious quarters in the Tanzmeisterhaus, also a Mozart museum today.

== Museum ==
A museum since 1880, Wolfgang Amadeus Mozart birthplace introduces visitors to the early life of the composer, his first musical instruments, his friends and his passionate interest in opera. The third floor exhibits Mozart's childhood violin, harpsichord, as well as portraits, documents, family letters, and early editions of his music. There are also records of his life in Vienna and of his wife and family. The second floor is devoted to Mozart's interest in opera and includes the clavichord on which he composed The Magic Flute. The first floor replicates living conditions in Mozart's day with period furniture. Original documents and paintings illustrate his life in Salzburg. Other items in the museum are an incomplete portrait of Mozart painted by Joseph Lange, his brother-in-law in 1789 (one of Mozart's striking portraits), pictures of his childhood, and his childhood violin.

== See also ==
- List of music museums
