= Mozarteum Orchestra Salzburg =

Austrian orchestra

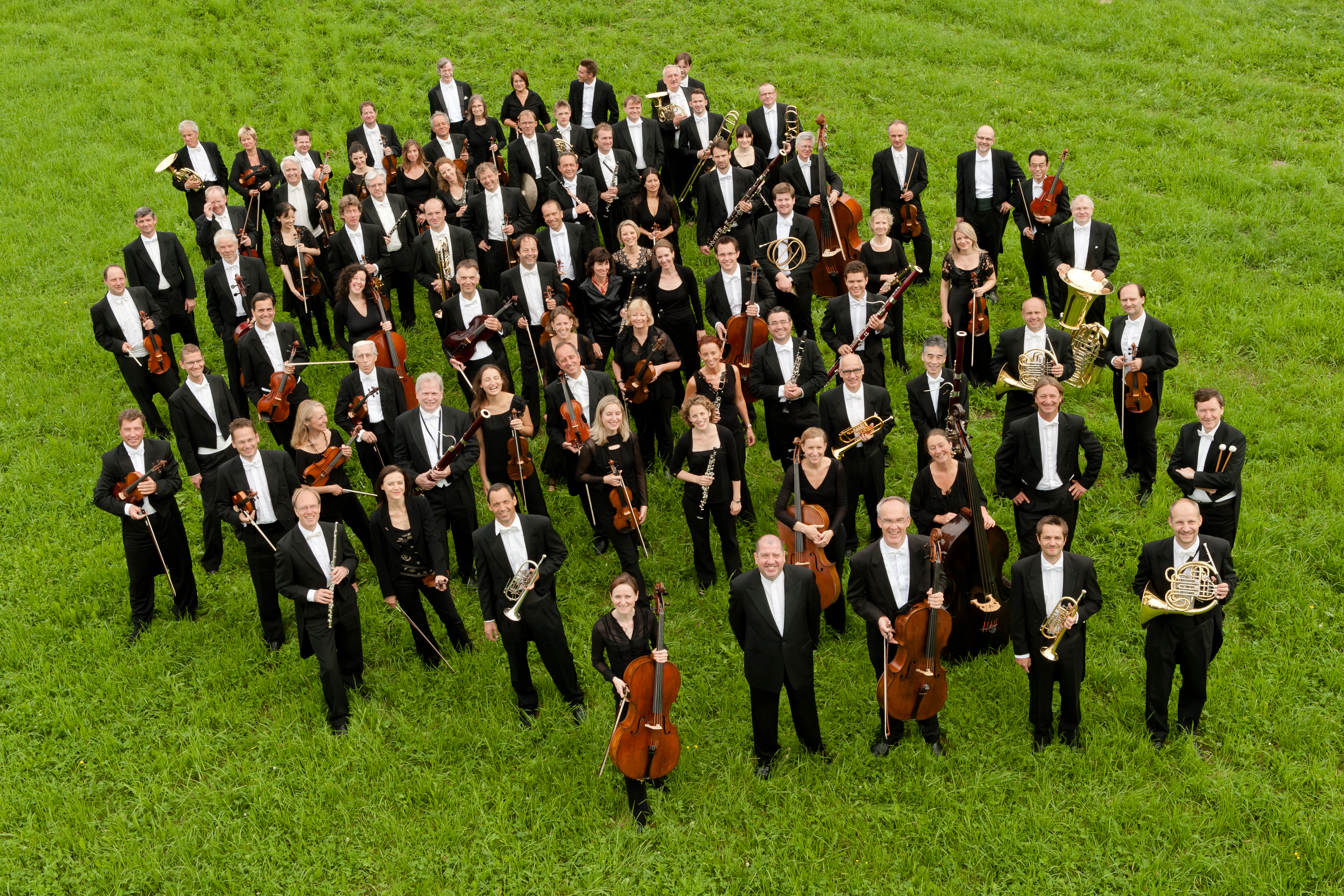
The Mozarteum Orchestra Salzburg

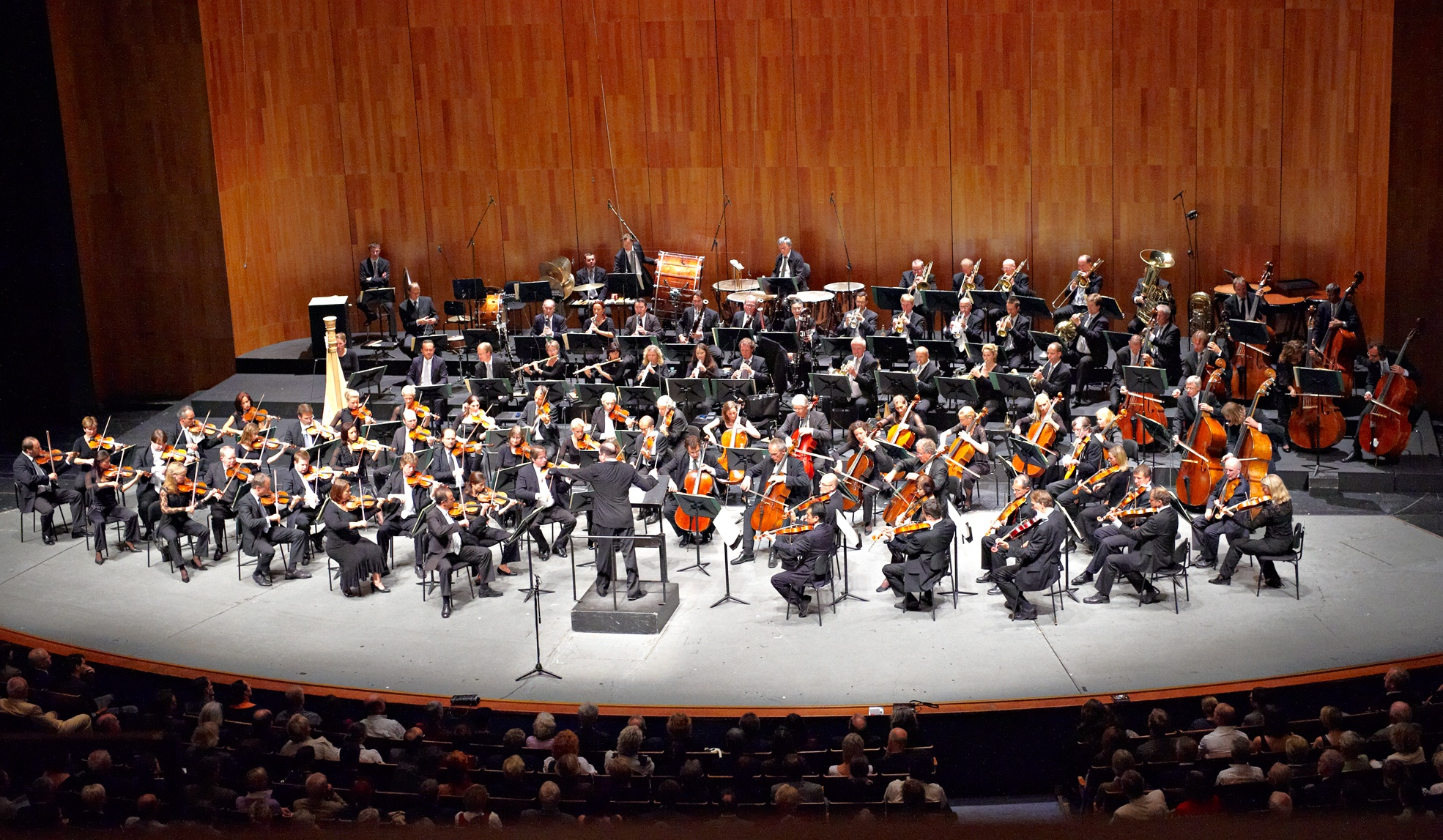
A concert at the Great Festival Hall, Salzburg

The Mozarteum Orchestra Salzburg is an Austrian orchestra, based in the town and state of Salzburg. The orchestra gives concerts in several Salzburg venues, including the Großes Festspielhaus and the Great Hall of the Stiftung Mozarteum. In addition to symphony orchestra concerts, the orchestra serves as accompanying ensemble for operas and musical theatre performances at the Salzburg State Theater.

The ensemble was founded in 1841 with the help of Mozart’s sons Franz Xaver and Karl Thomas, as well as his widow Constanze, under the musical direction of Alois Taux. In 1908, the ensemble officially adopted the name "Mozarteum Orchestra". The Mozarteum Orchestra participates regularly at the Salzburg Festival, such as in the Festival's 'Mozart Matinees'. It also performs several concerts at the Salzburg Mozart Week and for the Salzburg Cultural Association.

In 2008, the Mozarteum Orchestra began a young project, '2 ORCHESTRAS', which presents new works for the combination of a professional orchestra and a youth orchestra. Composers who have written works for this project have included Kurt Schwertsik and Toshio Hosokawa.

The orchestra's current chief conductor is Roberto González-Monjas. Past principal guest conductors of the orchestra have included Trevor Pinnock. The orchestra's current principal guest conductor is Giovanni Antonini.

The Mozarteum Orchestra has recorded commercially for such labels as Oehms Classics, Sony Classical, and Naive. During the 1970s and 80s, the Mozarteum Orchestra recorded Mozart's complete early operas (Apollo et Hyacinthus, Bastien und Bastienne, Mitridate, re di Ponto, Ascanio in Alba, Il sogno di Scipione, Lucio Silla, La finta giardiniera, Il re pastore) with Leopold Hager on Deutsche Grammophon, later reissued on Philips for the Complete Mozart Edition. In 1989, the Mozarteum Orchestra recorded Mozart's La finta semplice, once again with Hager, on Orfeo. In 1983, they recorded Mozart's Zaide, although still unfinished, for Orfeo. They recorded the complete Mozart symphonies, under the direction of Hans Graf for Capriccio in separate volumes, but then gathered into a full box set. They worked primarily for Deutsche Grammophon, with the Mozart operas and a majority of the concert arias, in cooperation with artists such as Edita Gruberová, Lucia Popp, Edith Mathis, Hanna Schwarz, Thomas Moser and Walter Berry. These were all reissued in 1991 to form Volume 23 of the Complete Mozart Edition (Arias, vocal ensembles, canons).

== Principal conductors ==
- 1841–1861: Alois Taux
- 1861–1868: Hans Schläger
- 1868–1879: Otto Bach
- 1880–1908: Joseph Friedrich Hummel
- 1908–1911: Joseph Reiter
- 1911–1913: Paul Graener
- 1913–1917: Franz Ledwinka
- 1917–1938: Bernhard Paumgartner
- 1939–1944: Willem van Hoogstraten
- 1946: Robert Wagner
- 1947–1949: Meinhard von Zallinger
- 1949–1953: Paul Walter
- 1953–1958: Ernst Märzendorfer
- 1959: Meinhard von Zallinger
- 1960–1969: Mladen Bašić
- 1969–1981: Leopold Hager
- 1981–1984: Ralf Weikert
- 1984–1994: Hans Graf
- 1994–2004: Hubert Soudant
- 2004–2016: Ivor Bolton
- 2017–2022: Riccardo Minasi
- 2024–present: Roberto González-Monjas
