= The Complete Mozart Edition =

Studio album by various artists
- Released: 1990/1991, 2000 (modified version), 2006 (original re-issue)
- Genre: Classical
- Label: Philips Classics Records

The Complete Mozart Edition is a 180-CD collection released in 1990–91 featuring all works by Wolfgang Amadeus Mozart (known at the set's publication) assembled by Philips Classics Records to commemorate the 200th anniversary of Mozart's death (December 5, 1791). It has been re-released in 2000 in a modified version as the Complete Compact Mozart Edition.

== Overview ==
The Complete Mozart Edition comprises 180 compact discs arranged into 45 themed volumes.

Each volume in the series is accompanied by a deluxe booklet with detailed information about the works, with many illustrations. Indicating the significance of this particular series, the words of the accompanying Compactotheque state, "...After the complete Shakespeare, the complete Goethe, or the complete Molière in book form, here is the Complete Mozart on discs."

A modified version of The Complete Mozart Edition, the Complete Compact Mozart Edition, was released in 2000. It consists of 17 individual boxed sets. This version also contains stripped-down versions of the booklets that accompanied the original series.

The Complete Mozart Edition and The Complete Compact Mozart Edition are both accompanied by a 200-page booklet which presents a condensed biography of Mozart with many photographs, describes in detail all boxes content and contains a complete index of all the musical works following the Köchel catalogue.

This set is not to be confused with the similar complete edition (on 170 CDs) by Brilliant Classics entitled Complete Works.

In addition, a boxed set entitled The Best of the Complete Mozart Edition was also released on November 14, 1995. This set contains 25 compact discs and represents a selection of the 1990–91 or 2000 sets.

== 1979 Mozart Edition ==
Philips had previously released a Mozart Edition, a series of 16 vinyl box sets issued in 1979. They purposely did not use the title of Complete Mozart Edition as it obviously was not a complete catalogue of his works. The series consisted of his main works only, although all of his operas, orchestral and chamber works were included. Due to the fact that it was released earlier than the Complete Edition, Philips did not have that many recordings at their disposal, and quite a few of the recordings in the Complete Edition were recorded specifically for it.

== Cover art ==
The artwork for all 45 boxes was designed by Pet Halmen, directed by Estelle Kercher and photographed by Christine Woidich. The designs focus on minimalism, with small objects that represent the music included in each volume (i.e. trumpet for wind music, piano for piano concertos, violin for violin sonatas and horn for wind concertos). Miniature figurines and dolls were also incorporated, which were all brought together in the artwork of the final volume.

The artwork for the Complete Compact Mozart Edition consisted of photographs depicting different architectural designs and details, taken by Matthew Weinreb throughout Austria, Germany, Italy and Czechoslovakia. The 180 disc box set containing all 17 volumes of the 2000 Edition features an upwards panoramic view of the interior of the Royal Opera House.

They also incorporated a stylized version of Mozart's signature (surname only) on both the 1991 and 2000 Editions.

== Similarities and differences from Mozart 225 ==
In 2016, Decca and Deutsche Grammophon partnered with the International Mozarteum Foundation and issued a new edition of Mozart's complete works on disc, Mozart 225, to commemorate the 225th anniversary of his death. The edition was once the largest CD box set dedicated to one person in the world, until it was overtaken by Deutsche Grammophon's Karajan Edition. Consisting of 200 discs, it contains all of Mozart's known works, including those of fragmentary, doubtful or spurious status. It also contains two hard-back books: a biography written by the Canadian Mozart scholar Cliff Eisen and a guide to the music.

There are many similarities and differences between the 1991 Philips Edition and Mozart 225. Decca and Deutsche Grammophon chose to use recordings from their own catalogue instead of from the old Philips one (which at that time had become joint with the Universal Music Group). For example, they used Trevor Pinnock's cycle of Mozart's symphonies with The English Concert, originally on the Archiv Produktion label. They did use a majority of the same recordings for the earlier operas (Leopold Hager's Deutsche Grammophon recordings), as well as many of his sacred works included in the 1991 Edition (with Herbert Kegel).

The 2016 Edition also features many works that were not included in the 1991 Edition, such as his doubtful, spurious or incomplete works. One of the most significant discoveries was in the preparation for Mozart 225 when the German composer and musicologist Timo Jouko Herrmann discovered the cantata Per la ricuperata salute di Ofelia, K. 477a, which until its discovery was considered lost. The authorship is attributed to both Mozart and the Italian composer Antonio Salieri, the man notoriously known as Mozart's "rival". It received its first recording in 2016 by Claire Elizabeth Craig (soprano) and Florian Birsak (fortepiano), which was included in Mozart 225.

== The original The Complete Mozart series ==
Vol. No.	Catalog No.	Title	Number of CDs	Date of release (year, month)	Artist(s)	Included works (by Köchel number)
01	422 501-2	Early symphonies	6	1990, 09	Academy of St Martin in the Fields, Sir Neville Marriner	16, 19, App. 223/19a, 22, 43, 45, K deest, App. 214/45b, 48, 61g No. 1, 73, 74, 75, 76/42a, 81/73l, 84/73q, 95/73n, 96/111b, 97/73m, 110/75b, 112, 114, 124, 128, 129, 130, 132, 133, 141a (161 & 163), 111 & 120/111a, 196 & 121/207a, 208 & 102/213c
02	422 502-2	Symphonies 21–41	6	1990, 09	Academy of St Martin in the Fields, Sir Neville Marriner	134, 162, 181/162b, 182/173dA, 183/173 dB, 184/161a, 199/161b, 200/189k, 201/186a, 202/186b, 297/300a, 318, 319, 338, 385, 409/383f, 425, 444/425a, 504, 543, 550, 551
03	422 503-2	Serenades for orchestra	7	1990, 10	Academy of St Martin in the Fields, Sir Neville Marriner	32, 62, 63, 99, 100, 131, 185, 189, 203, 204, 215, 237, 239, 249, 250, 286, 320, 335, 525
04	422 504-2	Divertimenti for strings and wind	5	1990, 10	Academy of St Martin in the Fields Chamber Ensemble	113, 136/125a, 137, 138/125c, 205/167A, 247, 248, 251, 287/271H, 290/167AB, 334/320b, 445/320c, 522, 525
05	422 505-2	Serenades and divertimenti for wind instruments	6	1990, 11	Academy of St Martin in the Fields, Sir Neville Marriner; Holliger Wind Ensemble; Netherlands Wind Ensemble	361/370a, 188/240b, 388/384a, 375, 186/159b, 166/159d, 411/484a, 410/484d, Anh. 94/580a, 289/271g, 213, 240, 252/240a, 253, 270, Anh. 229/439b, 487/496a, Anh. 226/Anh. C 17.01, Anh. 227/Anh. C 17.02
06	422 506-2	Dances and marches	6	1990, 11	Wiener Mozart-Ensemble, Willi Boskovsky	61b/65a, 61g-2, 61h, 94/73h, 101, 103/61d, 104/61e, 105/61f, 106/588a, 122/73t, 123/73g, 164/130a, 176, 214, 267/271c, 269b, 300, 315g/315a, 363, 408, 461/448a, 462/448b, 463/448c, 509, 534, 535, 535a, 536, 567, 568, 571, 585, 586, 587, 599, 600, 601, 602, 603, 604, 605, 606, 607/605a, 609, 610, A103/299d (320f)
07	422 507-2	Piano concertos	12	1990, 12	Academy of St Martin in the Fields, Sir Neville Marriner; Capella Academica Wien, Eduard Melkus; Amsterdam Baroque Orchestra, Ton Koopman; Berlin Philharmonic, Semyon Bychkov; Alfred Brendel, Imogen Cooper, Katia and Marielle Labèque, Ingrid Haebler	37, 39, 40, 41, 107 No. 1, 107 No. 2, 107 No. 3, 175, 238, 242, 246, 271, 365/316a, 382, 386, 413/387a, 414/385p, 415/387b, 449, 450, 451, 453, 456, 459, 466, 467, 482, 488, 491, 503, 537, 595
08	422 508-2	Violin concertos	4	1991, 02	New Philharmonia Orchestra, Sir Alexander Gibson; Academy of St Martin in the Fields, Iona Brown; with Henryk Szeryng, Nobuko Imai, Gérard Poulet, Stephen Orton, and Howard Shelley	190, 207, 211, 216, 218, 219, 261, 269, 271i, 315f, 320e, 364, 373
09	422 509-2	Wind concertos	5	1991, 02	Academy of St Martin in the Fields, Sir Neville Marriner; with Irena Grafenauer, Aurèle Nicolet, Heinz Holliger, Neil Black, Karl Leister, Jack Brymer, Peter Damm, Hermann Baumann, Alan Civil, Klaus Thunemann, Michael Chapman, and Maria Graf	191/186e, 299/297c, 313/285c, (314)/271k, 314/285d, 315/285e, 371, 386b (412 & 514), 417, 447, 495, 622, App. 9/297B, App. C14.01/297b
10	422 510-2	Wind quartets and quintets, movements and fragments	3	1991, 02	Academy of St Martin in the Fields Chamber Ensemble, Grumiaux Trio	168a, 174, 285, 285a, 288/246c, 292/196c, 298, 370/368b, 407/386c, 581, App. 66/562e, App. 68/589a, App. 72/464a, App. 79, App. 80/514a, App. 90/580b, App. 91/516c, App. 171/285b
11	422 511-2	String quintets	3	1991, 02	Arthur Grumiaux, Arpad Gérecz, Georges Janzer, Max Lesueur, Eva Czako	174, 406, 515, 516, 593, 614
12	422 512-2	String quartets	8	1991, 03	Quartetto Italiano: Paolo Borciani, Elisa Pegreffi, Piero Farulli, Franco Rossi	80/73f, 155/134a, 156/134b, 157, 158, 159, 160/159a, 168, 169, 170, 171, 172, 173, 387, 421/417b, 428/421b, 458, 464, 465, 499, 575, 589, 590
13	422 513-2	String trios and duos	2	1991, 03	Academy of St. Martin in the Fields Chamber Ensemble, Grumiaux Trio	266, 404a, 423, 424, 563
14	422 514-2	Piano quintets, quartets, trios, etc.	5	1991, 03	Beaux Arts Trio, Alfred Brendel, Heinz Holliger, Eduard Brunner, Hermann Baumann, Klaus Thunemann, Bishop Kovacevich, Jack Brymer, Patrick Ireland, Bruno Hoffmann, Aurèle Nicolet, Karl Schouten, Jean Decroos, Bruno Giuranna	254, 356/617a, 442, 452, 478, 493, 496, 498, 502, 542, 548, 564, 617
15	422 515-2	Violin sonatas	7	1991, 04	Arthur Grumiaux, Walter Klien, Gérard Poulet, Blandine Verlet, Isabelle van Keulen, Ronald Brautigam	6, 7, 8, 9, 10, 11, 12, 13, 14, 15, 26, 27, 28, 29, 30, 31, 296, 301/293a, 302/293b, 303/293c, 304/300c, 305/293d, 306/300l, 359/374a, 360/374b, 372, 376/374d, 377/374e, 378/317d, 379/373a, 380/374f, 396/385f, 402/385e, 403/385c, 404/385d, 454, 46d, 46e, 481, 526, 547
16	422 516-2	Music for two pianos/piano duets	2	1991, 04	Ingrid Haebler, Ludwig Hoffmann, Jörg Demus, Paul Badura-Skoda	19d, 381/123a, 358/186c, 448, 426, KVdeest, 497, 357/497a + 500a, 501, 521
17	422 517-2	Piano sonatas	5	1991, 04	Mitsuko Uchida	279/189d, 280/189e, 281/189f, 282//189g, 283/189h, 284/205b, 309/284b, 310/300d, 311/284c, 330/300h, 331/300i, 332/300k, 333/315c, 457, 475, 533 & 494, 545, 570, 576
18	422 518-2	Piano variations	5	1991, 05	Ingrid Haebler, Mitsuko Uchida, Ton Koopman	1a, 1b, 1c, 1d, 1f, 2, 3, 4, 5, 5a, 24, 25, 94/73h, 179/189a, 180/173c, 264/315d, 265/300e, 312/590d, 33B, 352/374c, 353/300f, 354/299a, 355/576b, 394/383a, 395/300g, 397/385g, 398/416e, 399/385i, 400/372a, 401/375e, 408-1/383e, 453a, 455, 460/454a, 485, 500, 511, 540, 573, 574, 613
19	422 519-2	Masses/Requiem	9	1991, 05	MDR Rundfunkchor, MDR Symphony Orchestra, Herbert Kegel; Vienna Boys' Choir, Vienna Symphony, Uwe Christian Harrer; John Alldis Choir, London Symphony Orchestra, Sir Colin Davis; Monteverdi Choir, English Baroque Soloists, John Eliot Gardiner; Sächsische Staatskapelle Dresden, Peter Schreier; Edith Mathis, Helen Donath, Celestina Casapietra, Annelies Burmeister, Peter Schreier, Hermann Christian Polster, Peter Jelosits, Gerhard Eder, Gillian Knight, Ryland Davies, Clifford Grant, Sylvia McNair, Diane Montague, Anthony Rolfe Johnson, Cornelius Hauptmann, Margaret Price, Trudeliese Schmidt, Francisco Araiza, Theo Adam ...	49, 65, 66, 139, 140, 167, 192, 194, 220, 257, 258, 259, 262, 275, 317, 337, 427, 626
20	422 520-2	Litanies/Vespers	5	1991, 06	MDR Rundfunkchor, MDR Symphony Orchestra, Herbert Kegel; London Symphony Orchestra & Choir, Sir Colin Davis; Mitsuko Shirai, Isabella Nawe, Heidi Ries, Eberhard Büchner, Hermann Christian Polster, Kiri Te Kanawa, Elizabeth Bainridge, Ryland Davies, Gwynne Howell, Dagmar Schellenberg-Ernst, Rosemarie Lang, Ralph Eschrig, René Pape	109/74e, 243, 321, 125, 195/186d, 193/186g, 339, 341/368a, 618, 165/158a, 20, 33, 34, 44/73u, 47, 72/74f, 86/73s, 86/73v, 90, 91/186i, 108/74d, 117/66a, 198/C3.08, 222/205a, 260/248a, 273, 276/321b, 277/272a, 322/296a, 323/App. 15
21	422 521-2	Organ sonatas & solos	2	1991, 06	Daniel Chorzempa, Deutsche Bachsolisten, Helmut Winschermann	67/41h, 68/41i, 69/41k, 144/124a, 145/124b, 212, 224/241a, 241, 225/241b, 244, 245, 263, 274/271d, 278/271e, 328/317c, 329/317a, 336/336d, 594, 608, 616
22	422 522-2	Oratorios, cantatas, masonic music	6	1991, 06	Choir of the Süddeutscher Rundfunk, Stuttgart Radio Symphony Orchestra, Sir Neville Marriner; Mozarteum Orchestra Salzburg, Kammerchor Salzburg, Leopold Hager; MDR Rundfunkchor, Sächsische Staatskapelle Dresden; Margaret Marshall, Inga Nielsen, Ann Murray, Hans Peter Blochwitz, Aldo Baldin, Peter Schreier, Hanna Schwarz, Ileana Cotrubaș, Walter Berry, Gabriele Fuchs, Margarita Zimmermann, Andreas Schmidt	35, 146/317b, 42/35a, 118/74c, 469, 623, 546, 468, 148/125h, 429/468a, 477/479a, 483, 484, 471, 619, 623a,
23	422 523-2	Arias, vocal ensembles, canons	8	1991, 07	Chorus Viennensis, Mozarteum Orchestra Salzburg, Bavarian Radio Symphony Orchestra, Leopold Hager, Jörg-Peter Weigle; Edita Gruberová, Julie Kaufmann, Eva Lind, Edith Mathis, Lucia Popp, Hanna Schwarz, Francisco Araiza, Hans Peter Blochwitz, Peter Schreier, Walter Berry, Robert Lloyd, Stuart Burrows, Robert Tear, Christiane Eda-Pierre, Claes-Håkan Ahnsjö, and others	21/19c, 23, 36/33i, 70/61c, deest, 78/73b, 88/73c, 79/73d, 77/73e, 82/73o, 83/73p, 74b, 209, 210, 217, 255, 256, 272, 294, 295, 486a/295a, 316/300b, 368, 369, 374, 383, 416, 418, 419, 420, 432/421a, 431/425b, 505, 512, 513, 528, 538, 539, 541, 578, 583, 612, Anh. 245/621a, 83/73p, 293e, 294, 295, 119/382h, 440/383h, 435/416b, 433/416c, 178/417e, 580, 51/46a, 87/74a, 135, 490, 489, 389/384A, 492, 577, 579, 540b, 584, Anh. 25/386d, 434/480b, 441, 479, 480, 532, 552, Anh. 5/571a, 625/592a, 348/382g, 232/509a, 558, 559, 560a/559a, 229/382a, 230/382b, 73i, 228/515b, 562, 508a, deest, 508a, 347/382f, 507, 508, 556, 231/382c, 233/382d, 234/382e, 561, 560a/559a, 89a/73r, Anh. 191/562c, 508a/8, 555, 557, 508a, 562a, deest, 89/73k, 554, 553
24	422 524-2	Lieder and notturni	2	1991, 07	Elly Ameling, Elisabeth Cooymans, Peter van der Bilt, Dalton Baldwin, Benny Ludemann, Netherlands Wind Ensemble	53/47, 147/125g, 148/125h, 149/125d, 150/125e, 151/125f, 152/210a, 307/284d, 308/295b, 343/336c, 346/439a, 349/367a, 351/367b, 390/340c, 391/340b, 392/340a, 433/416c, 436, 437, 438, 439, 468, 472, 473, 474, 475, 506, 517, 518, 519, 520, 523, 524, 529, 530, 531, 579, 579, 596, 597, 598
25	422 525-2	Theatre and ballet music	2	1991, 07	Staatskapelle Berlin, Bernhard Klee; Netherlands Chamber Orchestra, David Zinman; Academy of St Martin in the Fields, Sir Neville Marriner	299c, 345/336a, 367, 446/416d, App. 10/299b
26	422 526-2	Apollo et Hyacinthus	2	1991, 08	Mozarteum Orchestra Salzburg, Kammerchor Salzburg, Leopold Hager; Arleen Auger, Edith Mathis, Hanna Schwarz, Anthony Rolfe Johnson,	38
27	422 527-2	Bastien und Bastienne	1	1991, 08	Vienna Boys' Choir, Vienna Symphony, Uwe Christian Harrer	50/46b
28	422 528-2	La finta semplice	2	1991, 08	C.P.E. Bach Chamber Orchestra, Peter Schreier; Barbara Hendricks, Ann Murray, Eva Lind, Hans Peter Blochwitz, Douglas Johnson, Siegfried Lorenz, Andreas Schmidt	51/46a
29	422 529-2	Mitridate, re di Ponto	3	1991, 08	Mozarteum Orchestra Salzburg, Leopold Hager; Arleen Auger, Edita Gruberová, Agnes Baltsa, Ileana Cotrubaș, Werner Hollweg, David Kuebler, Lilian Sukis, Christine Weidinger	87/74a
30	422 530-2	Ascanio in Alba	3	1991, 08	Mozarteum Orchestra Salzburg, Chamber Choir Salzburg, Leopold Hager; Arleen Auger, Edith Mathis, Agnes Baltsa, Peter Schreier, Lilian Sukis	111
31	422 531-2	Il sogno di Scipione	2	1991, 08	Mozarteum Orchestra Salzburg, Chamber Choir Salzburg, Leopold Hager; Edith Mathis, Edita Gruberová, Peter Schreier, Lucia Popp; Thomas Moser, Claes-Hakan Ahnsjo	126
32	422 532-2	Lucio Silla	3	1991, 09	Mozarteum Orchestra Salzburg, Mozarteum Choir of Salzburg, Leopold Hager; Arleen Auger, Edith Mathis, Júlia Várady, Helen Donath, Peter Schreier, Werner Krenn	135
33	422 533-2	La finta giardiniera	3	1991, 09	Mozarteum Orchestra Salzburg, Leopold Hager; Brigitte Fassbaender, Barry McDaniel, Thomas Moser, Julia Conwell, Lilian Sukis, Ezio di Cesare, Jutta-Renate Ihloff	196
34	422 534-2	Die Gärtnerin Aus Liebe	3	1991, 09	Chor und Sinfonieorchester des Norddeutschen Rundfunks, Hans Schmidt-Isserstedt; Jessye Norman, Helen Donath, Tatiana Troyanos, Ileana Cotrubaș, Werner Hollweg, Hermann Prey, Gerhard Unger	196
35	422 535-2	Il re pastore	2	1991, 09	Academy of St Martin in the Fields (cond. Sir Neville Marriner), John Constable, Briony Shaw, Jerry Hadley, Angela Maria Blasi, Sylvia McNair, Iris Vermillion, Claes H. Ahnsjö	208
36	422 536-2	Zaide, Der Schauspieldirektor	2	1991, 09	Staatskapelle Berlin, Bernhard Klee; Edith Mathis, Peter Schreier, Ingvar Wixell, Werner Hollweg, Reiner Süß, Armin Ude; London Symphony Orchestra, Sir Colin Davis; Ruth Welting, Ileana Cotrubaș, Anthony Rolfe Johnson, Clifford Grant,	344, 486
37	422 537-2	Idomeneo, re di Creta	3	1991, 10	Bavarian Radio Symphony Orchestra & Choir, Sir Colin Davis; Barbara Hendricks, Suzanne Mentzer, Júlia Várady, Francisco Araiza, Thomas Allen, Keith Lewis	366
38	422 538-2	Die Entführung aus dem Serail	2	1991, 10	Academy of St Martin in the Fields, Sir Colin Davis; Christiane Eda-Pierre, Stuart Burrows, Robert Tear, Norma Burrowes, Robert Lloyd, Curd Jürgens	384
39	422 539-2	L'oca del Cairo, Lo sposo deluso	1	1991, 10	Members of the Choir of the Berliner Rundfunk, C.P.E. Bach Chamber Orchestra, Peter Schreier; London Symphony Orchestra, Sir Colin Davis; Inga Nielsen, Edith Wiens, Pamela Coburn, Peter Schreier, Douglas Johnson, Dietrich Fischer-Dieskau, Anton Scharinger, Felicity Palmer, Ileana Cotrubaș, Anthony Rolfe Johnson, Robert Tear, Clifford Grant,	422, 430
40	422 540-2	Le nozze di Figaro	3	1991, 10	BBC Symphony Orchestra, BBC Symphony Chorus, Sir Colin Davis; Jessye Norman, Mirella Freni, Yvonne Minton, Ingvar Wixell, Wladimiro Ganzarolli, Maria Casula, Clifford Grant, Robert Tear, David Lennox, Paul Hudson, Lillian Watson	492
41	422 541-2	Don Giovanni	3	1991, 11	Chorus and Orchestra of the Royal Opera House, Covent Garden, Sir Colin Davis; Ingvar Wixell, Martina Arroyo, Kiri Te Kanawa, Stuart Burrows, Wladimiro Ganzarolli, Mirella Freni, Richard Van Allan, Luigi Roni	527
42	422 542-2	Così fan tutte	3	1991, 11	Chorus and Orchestra of the Royal Opera House, Covent Garden, Sir Colin Davis; Montserrat Caballé, Janet Baker, Ileana Cotrubaș, Nicolai Gedda, Richard Van Allan, Wladimiro Ganzarolli	588
43	422 543-2	Die Zauberflöte	3	1991, 11	MDR Rundfunkchor, Sächsische Staatskapelle Dresden, Sir Colin Davis; Margaret Price, Luciana Serra, Peter Schreier, Kurt Moll, Mikael Melbye, Maria Venuti, Theo Adam, Robert Tear, Marie McLaughlin, Ann Murray, Hanna Schwarz, Reiner Goldberg	620
44	422 544-2	La clemenza di Tito	2	1991, 11	Chorus and Orchestra of the Royal Opera House, Covent Garden (cond. Sir Colin Davis), John Constable, Stuart Burrows, Janet Baker, Lucia Popp, Yvonne Minton, Frederica von Stade, Robert Lloyd	621
45	422 545-2	Rarities & Surprises	3	1991, 11	Academy of St Martin in the Fields, Sir Neville Marriner, Kenneth Sillito; Netherlands Wind Ensemble; MDR Rundfunkchor, MDR Symphony Orchestra, Peter Schreier; Symphonieorchester des Bayerischen Rundfunks, Sir Colin Davis; Timothy Brown, Mitsuko Uchida, Neil Black, Thea King, Julian Farrell, Robin O'Neill, Monika Frimmer, Erik Smith, Susanne Mentzer, Barbara Hendricks, Andreas Röhn	15a/App. 109b No. 1, 15b/App. 109b No. 2, 15bb, 15cc, 15d, 15dd, 15e, 15f, 15gg, 15h, 15i, 15ii, 15kk, 15l, 15ll/App. 109b No. 9, 15mm, 15o, 15p, 15p/App. 109b No. 3, 15q, 15qq, 15r/App. 109b No. 7, 15t/App. 109b No. 5, 15u, 15v, 15x, 15z, 33B, 142/App. 186d, 197/App. 186e, 371, 384, 452a/App. 54, 490, 516f, 527, 535b/App. 107, 565a, deest

== The Complete Compact Mozart Edition ==
Vol. No.	Catalog No.	Title	Number of CDs	Artist(s)	Included major works (by Köchel number)
01	464 7702	Symphonies	12	Academy of St Martin in the Fields, Sir Neville Marriner	16, 19, App. 223/19a, 22, 43, 45, K deest, App. 214/45b, 48, 61g No. 1, 73, 74, 75, 76/42a, 81/73l, 84/73q, 95/73n, 96/111b, 97/73m, 100/75b, 112, 114, 124, 128, 129, 130, 132, 133, 141a (161 & 163), 111 & 120/111a, 196 & 121/207a, 208 & 102/213c, 134, 162, 181/162b, 182/173dA, 183/173 dB, 184/161a, 199/161b, 200/189k, 201/186a, 202/186b, 297/300a, 318, 319, 338, 385, 409/383f, 425, 444/425a, 504, 543, 550, 551
02	464 7802	Serenades, dances, marches	13	Serenades: Academy of St Martin in the Fields – Sir Neville Marriner; Dances & Marches: Vienna Mozart Ensemble – Willi Boskovsky	32, 62, 63, 99, 100, 131, 185, 189, 203, 204, 215, 237, 239, 249, 250, 286, 320, 335, 525, 61b/65a, 61g-2, 61h, 94/73h, 101, 103/61d, 104/61e, 105/61f, 106/588a, 122/73t, 123/73g, 164/130a, 176, 214, 267/271c, 269b, 300, 315g/315a, 363, 408, 461/448a, 462/448b, 463/448c, 509, 534, 535, 535a, 536, 567, 568, 571, 585, 586, 587, 599, 600, 601, 602, 603, 604, 605, 606, 607/605a, 609, 610, A103/299d (320f)
03	464 7902	Divertimenti for strings and winds; Divertimenti & serenades for winds	11	Divertimenti for Strings: Academy of St. Martin in the Fields Chamber Ensemble; Divertimenti & Serenades for Wind: Academy of St Martin in the Fields – Sir Neville Marriner; Holliger Wind Ensemble; Netherlands Wind Ensemble	113, 136/125a, 137, 138/125c, 205/167A, 247, 248, 251, 287/271H, 290/167AB, 334/320b, 445/320c, 522, 525, 361/370a, 188/240b, 388/384a, 375, 186/159b, 166/159d, 411/484a, 410/484d, Anh. 94/580a, 289/271g, 213, 240, 252/240a, 253, 270, Anh. 229/439b, 487/496a, Anh. 226/Anh. C 17.01, Anh. 227/Anh. C 17.02
04	464 8002	Piano Concertos	12	[Alfred Brendel, Imogen Cooper, Katia and Marielle Labèque, Ingrid Haebler] Academy of St Martin in the Fields – Sir Neville Marriner;Capella Academica Wien – Eduard Melkus; Amsterdam Baroque Orchestra – Ton Koopman; Berlin Philharmonic – Semyon Bychkov	37, 39, 40, 41, 107 No. 1, 107 No. 2, 107 No. 3, 175, 238, 242, 246, 271, 365/316a, 382, 386, 413/387a, 414/385p, 415/387b, 449, 450, 451, 453, 456, 459, 466, 467, 482, 488, 491, 503, 537, 595
05	464 8102	Violin concertos; Wind concertos	9	Violin Concertos: New Philharmonia Orchestra – Sir Alexander Gibson; Academy of St Martin in the Fields – Iona Brown; with Henryk Szeryng, Nobuko Imai, Gérard Poulet, Stephen Orton, and Howard Shelley; Wind Concertos: Academy of St Martin in the Fields – Sir Neville Marriner; with Irena Grafenauer, Aurèle Nicolet, Heinz Holliger, Neil Black, Karl Leister, Jack Brymer, Peter Damm, Hermann Baumann, Alan Civil, Klaus Thunemann, Michael Chapman, and Maria Graf	190, 207, 211, 216, 218, 219, 261, 269, 271i, 315f, 320e, 364, 373, 191/186e, 299/297c, 313/285c, (314)/271k, 314/285d, 315/285e, 371, 386b (412 & 514), 417, 447, 495, 622, App. 9/297B, App. C14.01/297b
06	464 8202	Quintets, quartets, trios, etc.	8	Piano Quintets, Quartets, Trios: Beaux Arts Trio, Alfred Brendel, Heinz Holliger, Eduard Brunner, Hermann Baumann, Klaus Thunemann, Stephen Bishop Kovacevich, Jack Brymer, Patrick Ireland, Bruno Hoffmann, Aurèle Nicolet, Karl Schouten, Jean Decroos, Bruno Giuranna; Wind Quartets & Quintets + Movements & Fragments: Academy of St. Martin in the Fields' Chamber Ensemble; Grumiaux Trio	168a, 174, 285, 285a, 288/246c, 292/196c, 298, 370/368b, 407/386c, 581, App. 66/562e, App. 68/589a, App. 72/464a, App. 79, App. 80/514a, App. 90/580b, App. 91/516c, App. 171/285b, 254, 356/617a, 442, 452, 478, 493, 496, 498, 502, 542, 548, 564, 617
07	464 8302	String quartets, String quintets	11	String Quartets: Quartetto Italiano: Paolo Borciani, Elisa Pegreffi, Piero Farulli, Franco Rossi; String Quintets: Arthur Grumiaux, Arpad Gérecz, Georges Janzer, Max Lesueur, Eva Czako	80/73f, 155/134a, 156/134b, 157, 158, 159, 160/159a, 168, 169, 170, 171, 172, 173, 387, 421/417b, 428/421b, 458, 464, 465, 499, 575, 589, 590, 174, 406, 515, 516, 593, 614
08	464 8402	Violin sonatas; String duos & trios	9	Violin Sonatas: Arthur Grumiaux, Walter Klien, Gérard Poulet, Blandine Verlet, Isabelle van Keulen, Ronald Brautigam; String Duos & Trios: Academy of St. Martin in the Fields Chamber Ensemble; Grumiaux Trio	6, 7, 8, 9, 10, 11, 12, 13, 14, 15, 26, 27, 28, 29, 30, 31, 296, 301/293a, 302/293b, 303/293c, 304/300c, 305/293d, 306/300l, 359/374a, 360/374b, 372, 376/374d, 377/374e, 378/317d, 379/373a, 380/374f, 396/385f, 402/385e, 403/385c, 404/385d, 454, 46d, 46e, 481, 526, 547, 266, 404a, 423, 424, 563
09	464 8502	Piano music	12	Music for 2 Pianos, Piano Duets: Ingrid Haebler, Ludwig Hoffmann, Jörg Demus, Paul Badura-Skoda; Piano Sonatas: Mitsuko Uchida; Piano Variations: Ingrid Haebler, Mitsuko Uchida, Ton Koopman	19d, 381/123a, 358/186c, 448, 426, KVdeest, 497, 357/497a + 500a, 501, 521, 279/189d, 280/189e, 281/189f, 282//189g, 283/189h, 284/205b, 309/284b, 310/300d, 311/284c, 330/300h, 331/300i, 332/300k, 333/315c, 457, 475, 533 & 494, 545, 570, 576, 1a, 1b, 1c, 1d, 1f, 2, 3, 4, 5, 5a, 24, 25, 94/73h, 179/189a, 180/173c, 264/315d, 265/300e, 312/590d, 33B, 352/374c, 353/300f, 354/299a, 355/576b, 394/383a, 395/300g, 397/385g, 398/416e, 399/385i, 400/372a, 401/375e, 408-1/383e, 453a, 455, 460/454a, 485, 500, 511, 540, 573, 574, 613
10	464 8602	Missae; Requiem; Organ sonatas & solos	11	Masses/Requiem: MDR Rundfunkchor, MDR Symphony Orchestra, Herbert Kegel; Vienna Boys' Choir, Vienna Symphony, Uwe Christian Harrer; John Alldis Choir, London Symphony Orchestra, Sir Colin Davis; Monteverdi Choir, English Baroque Soloists, John Eliot Gardiner; Sächsische Staatskapelle Dresden, Peter Schreier; Edith Mathis, Helen Donath, Celestina Casapietra, Annelies Burmeister, Peter Schreier, Hermann Christian Polster, Peter Jelosits, Gerhard Eder, Gillian Knight, Ryland Davies, Clifford Grant, Sylvia McNair, Diane Montague, Anthony Rolfe Johnson, Cornelius Hauptmann, Margaret Price, Trudeliese Schmidt, Francisco Araiza, Theo Adam; Organ Sonatas & Solos: Daniel Chorzempa, Deutsche Bachsolisten, Helmut Winschermann	49, 65, 66, 139, 140, 167, 192, 194, 220, 257, 258, 259, 262, 275, 317, 337, 427, 626, 67/41h, 68/41i, 69/41k, 144/124a, 145/124b, 212, 224/241a, 241, 225/241b, 244, 245, 263, 274/271d, 278/271e, 328/317c, 329/317a, 336/336d, 594, 608, 616
11	464 8702	Litanies; Vespers; Oratorios; Cantatas; Masonic Music	13	Litanies & Vespers: MDR Rundfunkchor, MDR Symphony Orchestra, Herbert Kegel; London Symphony Orchestra & Choir, Sir Colin Davis; Mitsuko Shirai, Isabella Nawe, Heidi Ries, Eberhard Büchner, Hermann Christian Polster, Kiri Te Kanawa, Elizabeth Bainridge, Ryland Davies, Gwynne Howell, Dagmar Schellenberg-Ernst, Rosemarie Lang, Ralph Eschrig, René Pape; Oratorios, Cantatas, Masonic Music: Choir of the Süddeutscher Rundfunk, Stuttgart Radio Symphony Orchestra, Sir Neville Marriner; Mozarteum Orchestra Salzburg, Kammerchor Salzburg, Leopold Hager; MDR Rundfunkchor, Sächsische Staatskapelle Dresden; Margaret Marshall, Inga Nielsen, Ann Murray, Hans Peter Blochwitz, Aldo Baldin, Peter Schreier, Hanna Schwarz, Ileana Cotrubaș, Walter Berry, Gabriele Fuchs, Margarita Zimmermann, Andreas Schmidt; Apollo et Hyacinthus: Mozarteum Orchestra Salzburg, Kammerchor Salzburg, Leopold Hager; Arleen Auger, Edith Mathis, Hanna Schwarz, Anthony Rolfe Johnson.	38, 109/74e, 243, 321, 125, 195/186d, 193/186g, 339, 341/368a, 618, 165/158a, 20, 33, 34, 44/73u, 47, 72/74f, 86/73s, 86/73v, 90, 91/186i, 108/74d, 117/66a, 198/C3.08, 222/205a, 260/248a, 273, 276/321b, 277/272a, 322/296a, 323/App. 15, 35, 146/317b, 42/35a, 118/74c, 469, 623, 546, 468, 148/125h, 429/468a, 477/479a, 483, 484, 471, 619, 623a
12	464 8802	Arias; Vocal ensembles; Canons; Lieder; Notturni	10	Arias, Vocal Ensembles, Canons: Chorus Viennensis, Mozarteum Orchestra Salzburg, Bavarian Radio Symphony Orchestra, Leopold Hager, Jörg-Peter Weigle; Edita Gruberová, Julie Kaufmann, Eva Lind, Edith Mathis, Lucia Popp, Hanna Schwarz, Francisco Araiza, Hans Peter Blochwitz, Peter Schreier, Walter Berry, Robert Lloyd, Stuart Burrows, Robert Tear, Christiane Eda-Pierre, Claes-Håkan Ahnsjö, and others; Lieder & Notturni: Elly Ameling, Elisabeth Cooymans, Peter van der Bilt, Dalton Baldwin, Benny Ludemann, Netherlands Wind Ensemble	21/19c, 23, 36/33i, 70/61c, deest, 78/73b, 88/73c, 79/73d, 77/73e, 82/73o, 83/73p, 74b, 209, 210, 217, 255, 256, 272, 294, 295, 486a/295a, 316/300b, 368, 369, 374, 383, 416, 418, 419, 420, 432/421a, 431/425b, 505, 512, 513, 528, 538, 539, 541, 578, 583, 612, Anh. 245/621a, 83/73p, 293e, 294, 295, 119/382h, 440/383h, 435/416b, 433/416c, 178/417e, 580, 51/46a, 87/74a, 135, 490, 489, 389/384A, 492, 577, 579, 540b, 584, Anh. 25/386d, 434/480b, 441, 479, 480, 532, 552, Anh. 5/571a, 625/592a, 348/382g, 232/509a, 558, 559, 560a/559a, 229/382a, 230/382b, 73i, 228/515b, 562, 508a, deest, 508a, 347/382f, 507, 508, 556, 231/382c, 233/382d, 234/382e, 561, 560a/559a, 89a/73r, Anh. 191/562c, 508a/8, 555, 557, 508a, 562a, deest, 89/73k, 554, 553, 53/47, 147/125g, 148/125h, 149/125d, 150/125e, 151/125f, 152/210a, 307/284d, 308/295b, 343/336c, 346/439a, 349/367a, 351/367b, 390/340c, 391/340b, 392/340a, 433/416c, 436, 437, 438, 439, 468, 472, 473, 474, 475, 506, 517, 518, 519, 520, 523, 524, 529, 530, 531, 579, 579, 596, 597, 598
13	464 8902	Early Italian operas	13	La finta semplice: C.P.E. Bach Chamber Orchestra, Peter Schreier; Barbara Hendricks, Ann Murray, Eva Lind, Hans Peter Blochwitz, Douglas Johnson, Siegfried Lorenz, Andreas Schmidt; Mitridate, re di Ponto: Mozarteum Orchestra Salzburg, Leopold Hager; Arleen Auger, Edita Gruberová, Agnes Baltsa, Ileana Cotrubaș, Werner Hollweg, David Kuebler, Lilian Sukis, Christine Weidinger; Ascanio in Alba: Mozarteum Orchestra Salzburg, Chamber Choir Salzburg, Leopold Hager; Arleen Auger, Edith Mathis, Agnes Baltsa, Peter Schreier, Lilian Sukis; Il sogno di Scipione: Mozarteum Orchestra Salzburg, Chamber Choir Salzburg, Leopold Hager; Edith Mathis, Edita Gruberová, Peter Schreier, Lucia Popp; Thomas Moser, Claes-Hakan Ahnsjo; Lucio Silla: Mozarteum Orchestra Salzburg, Mozarteum Choir Salzburg, Leopold Hager; Arleen Auger, Edith Mathis, Júlia Várady, Helen Donath, Peter Schreier, Werner Krenn;	51/46a, 87/74a, 111, 126, 135
14	464 9102	Middle Italian operas	9	La finta giardiniera: Mozarteum Orchestra Salzburg, Leopold Hager; Brigitte Fassbaender, Barry McDaniel, Thomas Moser, Julia Conwell, Lilian Sukis, Ezio di Cesare, Jutta-Renate Ihloff; Il re pastore: Academy of St Martin in the Fields (cond. Sir Neville Marriner), John Constable, Briony Shaw, Jerry Hadley, Angela Maria Blasi, Sylvia McNair, Iris Vermillion, Claes H. Ahnsjö; Idomeneo: Bavarian Radio Symphony Orchestra & Choir, Sir Colin Davis; Barbara Hendricks, Suzanne Mentzer, Júlia Várady, Francisco Araiza, Thomas Allen, Keith Lewis; L'oca del Cairo, Lo sposo deluso: Members of the Choir of the Berliner Rundfunk, C.P.E. Bach Chamber Orchestra, Peter Schreier; London Symphony Orchestra, Sir Colin Davis; Inga Nielsen, Edith Wiens, Pamela Coburn, Peter Schreier, Douglas Johnson, Dietrich Fischer-Dieskau, Anton Scharinger, Felicity Palmer, Ileana Cotrubaș, Anthony Rolfe Johnson, Robert Tear, Clifford Grant	196, 208, 366, 422, 430
15	464 9202	Late Italian operas	11	Le nozze di Figaro: BBC Symphony Orchestra, BBC Symphony Chorus, Sir Colin Davis; Jessye Norman, Mirella Freni, Yvonne Minton, Ingvar Wixell, Wladimiro Ganzarolli, Maria Casula, Clifford Grant, Robert Tear, David Lennox, Paul Hudson, Lillian Watson; Don Giovanni: Chorus and Orchestra of the Royal Opera House, Covent Garden, Sir Colin Davis; Ingvar Wixell, Martina Arroyo, Kiri Te Kanawa, Stuart Burrows, Wladimiro Ganzarolli, Mirella Freni, Richard Van Allan, Luigi Roni; Così fan tutte: Chorus and Orchestra of the Royal Opera House, Covent Garden, Sir Colin Davis; Montserrat Caballé, Janet Baker, Ileana Cotrubaș, Nicolai Gedda, Richard Van Allan, Wladimiro Ganzarolli; La clemenza di Tito: Chorus and Orchestra of the Royal Opera House, Covent Garden cond. Sir Colin Davis, John Constable, Stuart Burrows, Janet Baker, Lucia Popp, Yvonne Minton, Frederica von Stade, Robert Lloyd	492, 527, 588, 621
16	464 9302	German operas	11	Bastien und Bastienne: Vienna Boys' Choir, Vienna Symphony, Uwe Christian Harrer; Die Gärtnerin aus Liebe: Chor und Sinfonieorchester des Norddeutschen Rundfunks, Hans Schmidt-Isserstedt; Jessye Norman, Helen Donath, Tatiana Troyanos, Ileana Cotrubaș, Werner Hollweg, Hermann Prey, Gerhard Unger; Zaide, Der Schauspieldirektor: Staatskapelle Berlin, Bernhard Klee; Edith Mathis, Peter Schreier, Ingvar Wixell, Werner Hollweg, Reiner Süss, Armin Ude; London Symphony Orchestra, Sir Colin Davis; Ruth Welting, Ileana Cotrubaș, Anthony Rolfe Johnson, Clifford Grant; Die Entführung aus dem Serail: Academy of St Martin in the Fields, Sir Colin Davis; Christiane Eda-Pierre, Stuart Burrows, Robert Tear, Norma Burrowes, Robert Lloyd, Curd Jürgens; Die Zauberflöte: MDR Rundfunkchor, Sächsische Staatskapelle Dresden, Sir Colin Davis; Margaret Price, Luciana Serra, Peter Schreier, Kurt Moll, Mikael Melbye, Maria Venuti, Theo Adam, Robert Tear, Marie McLaughlin, Ann Murray, Hanna Schwarz, Reiner Goldberg	50/46b, 196, 344, 486, 384, 620
17	464 9402	Theatre and ballet music – Rarities and surprises	5	Theatre & Ballet Music: Staatskapelle Berlin, Bernhard Klee; Netherlands Chamber Orchestra, David Zinman; Academy of St Martin in the Fields, Sir Neville Marriner; Rarities & Surprises: Academy of St Martin in the Fields, Sir Neville Marriner, Kenneth Sillito; Netherlands Wind Ensemble; MDR Rundfunkchor, MDR Symphony Orchestra, Peter Schreier; Symphonieorchester des Bayerischen Rundfunks, Sir Colin Davis; Timothy Brown, Mitsuko Uchida, Neil Black, Thea King, Julian Farrell, Robin O'Neill, Monika Frimmer, Erik Smith, Susanne Mentzer, Barbara Hendricks, Andreas Röhn	299c, 345/336a, 367, 446/416d, App. 10/299b, 15a/App. 109b No. 1, 15b/App. 109b No. 2, 15bb, 15cc, 15d, 15dd, 15e, 15f, 15gg, 15h, 15i, 15ii, 15kk, 15l, 15ll/App. 109b No. 9, 15mm, 15o, 15p, 15p/App. 109b No. 3, 15q, 15qq, 15r/App. 109b No. 7, 15t/App. 109b No. 5, 15u, 15v, 15x, 15z, 33B, 142/App. 186d, 197/App. 186e, 371, 384, 452a/App. 54, 490, 516f, 527, 535b/App. 107, 565a, deest
