= Die Schuldigkeit des ersten Gebots =

Sacred drama by Wolfgang Amadeus Mozart

- Sacred Singspiel by W. A. Mozart
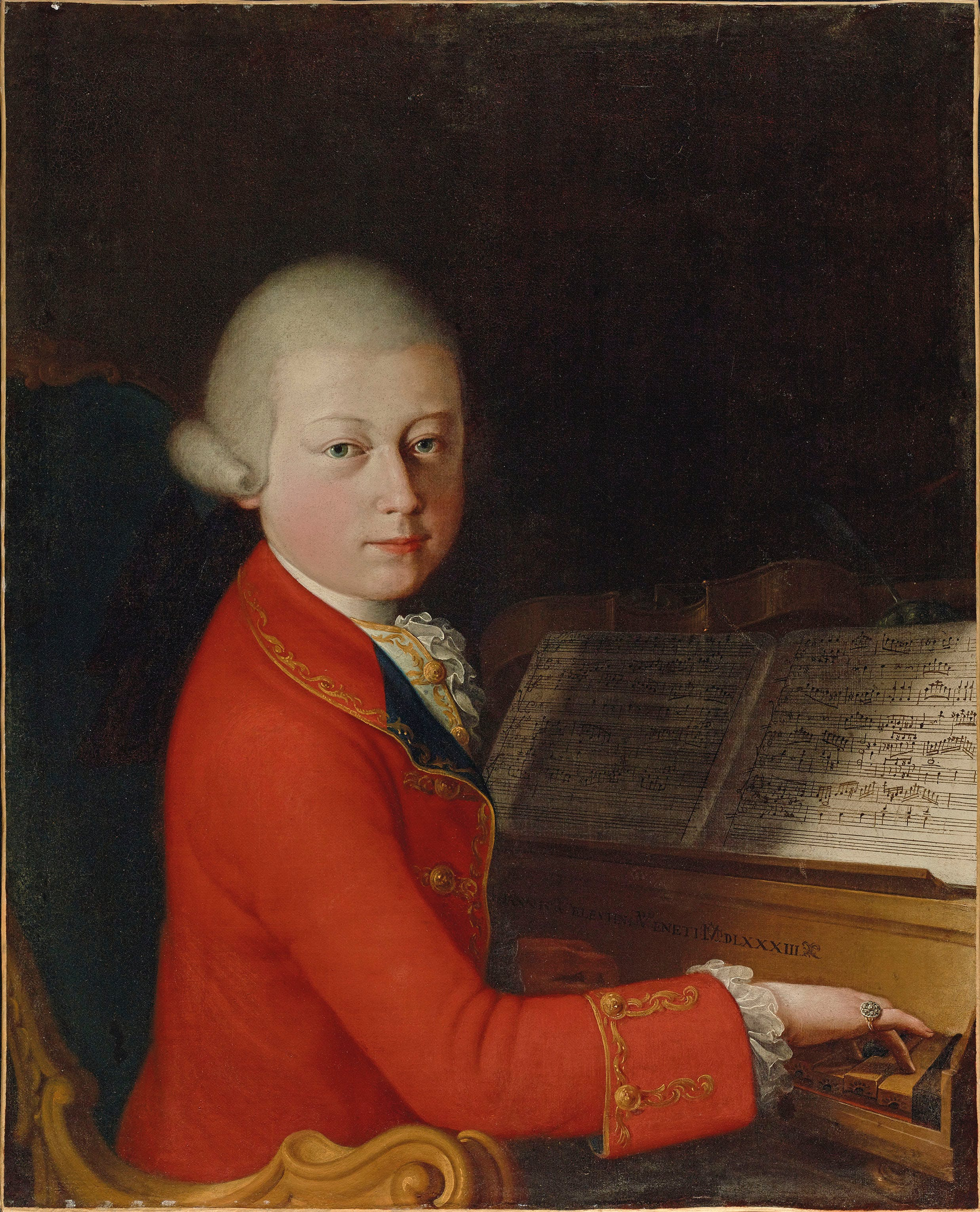
- 1770 Verona portrait of Mozart
- Librettist: Ignatz Anton von Weiser
- Language: German
- Premiere: 12 March 1767; Knights' Hall, Salzburg Residenz

Die Schuldigkeit des ersten Gebots (complete title in historical spelling: Die Schuldigkeit Des ersten und fürnehmsten Gebotes; The Obligation of the First and Foremost Commandment), K. 35, is a sacred musical play (geistliches Singspiel) composed by Wolfgang Amadeus Mozart in 1767 when he was 11 years old. It is Mozart's first opera or, more specifically, sacred drama, as is suggested by the name. The libretto is now attributed to Ignatz Anton von Weiser, although Johann Adam Wieland or Jakob Anton Marianus Wimmer had been suggested earlier. (The title page of the libretto ascribes it only to "J.A.W.".) Only the first part of the opera was composed by Mozart; the second and third parts were contributed by Michael Haydn and Anton Cajetan Adlgasser respectively. However, these other two parts have not survived. Part 1 of the opera was first performed on 12 March 1767, in the Knights' Hall of the Palace of the Archbishop, the Salzburg Residenz. Part 2 was performed on 19 March, and part 3 on 26 March.

== Background and performance history ==
Mozart composed the work at age 11 with the help of his two teachers, Michael Haydn and Anton Cajetan Adlgasser. In Salzburg, dividing up a sacred singspiel between other composers was common. The libretto was written by Ignatz Anton von Weiser even though it was said that Johann Adam Wieland suggested the idea first and his name is written on the libretto. Mozart composed only the first part of the opera, and the others composed "part two" and "part three." However, these other two parts have not survived. The performances were predominantly in Salzburg in St. Peter's, in Cathedrals, on the Nonnberg, and in Residenz. The opera includes many recitatives for all of the characters, and each character sings one to three arias. The characters of the opera are two tenors: Christgeist and Christ (a Christian), and three sopranos: Barmherzigkeit, Gerechtigkeit, and Weltgeist. The opera does not have a chorus.

Part I of the opera was first performed on 12 March 1767 in the Knight's Hall of the Palace of the Archbishop, Salzburg. Part II was performed on 19 March, and Part III on 26 March.

The first modern performance of the opera took place on 23 January 1987 in the Große Saal of the University of Salzburg. Organized by the International Mozarteum Foundation, it was mounted as part of the 1987 Mozart Week and performed in collaboration with the Salzburger Landestheater.

== Form ==
The court of Salzburg was well known for its theatrical productions, and throughout the 17th and 18th centuries the reigning prince-archbishops showed a particular predilection for the theatre. A popular genre was school drama whose intent was to give students an opportunity to display their oratory and acting skills to the general public, ergo making the genre pedagogic rather than commercial. The libretti were usually written or compiled by Benedictine monks, using text from Holy Scripture as well as figures from mythology and religious history. Originally conceived as plays with spoken dialogue, music steadily found its way into this genre of theatre, and had become a rather popular component of it by the time that Die Schuldigkeit des ersten Gebots was written.

There has been some difficulty in thoroughly understanding what genre Mozart's work is written in, but the general consensus is that it follows the form of a sacred singspiel more than it does a school drama. Despite this, there is little difference between the two genres; the former's subject matter is religious, with its main accent being placed on allegorical figures and themes as well as aiming to embody the lofty rhetoric of the Baroque era (the music of which was still held in considerably high regard). Both Adlgasser and Michael Haydn are known to have made previous considerable contributions to the genre of school drama, as have other prominent Austrian composers of the time such as Johann Ernst Eberlin and Wolfgang's father, Leopold. As is mentioned above, there were three composers entrusted with providing the music for this production, with only the contribution of Wolfgang surviving.

== Text ==
The attribution of the text's author has posed issues for musicologists. The libretto, now housed in the library of the University of Salzburg, states that the work was: "In three parts adapted by J. A. W." In the critical report of the work by Franz Giegling, published in 1956 for the Neue Mozart-Ausgabe, he states that there had been various assumptions regarding the author. Johann Adam Wieland (1710–1774) was the first to be considered, before the musicologist and author Alois Josef Hammerle attributed the text to Jacobus Antonius Wimmer (1725–1793); both men were clergymen active in Salzburg during the 1760s.

However, a diary discovered in the Salzburg monastic archives in 1957 by Herbert Klein, written by the Benedictine monk Beda Hübner, revealed critical information about the author of the work's text. A section of the diary, transcribed by Giegling, states as follows:

(1767) XIIma Martij Donnerstag ware anheüt nach dem abendlichen Gebethleiten bey Hoff in dem sogenannten Ritter Saal ein oratorium in der musique von fünf Personen, nämlich drey Singerinnen, und zweyen Mannesbilden Herr Meisner und Herr Spizeder. Den deutschen text hat componiret Herr Weiser ein Handels- und Ratsherr, die musique hat componiret der Wolfgang Mozart Knab alt von 10 Jahren

The language is rather archaic and has evident usage of dialect and Latin, but can roughly be translated into English:

(1767) On Thursday, the 12th of March, after evening prayers, an oratorio with music was performed today at the court in the so-called Knights' Hall [Ritter Saal] by five people, namely three female singers and two men, Herr Meisner [sic] and Herr Spizeder [sic]. The German text was composed by Herr Weiser, a merchant and councilman; the music was composed by Wolfgang Mozart, a boy of 10 years.

This new-found information led to the conclusion that the text was written by Ignatz Anton von Weiser (1701–1785), a dramatist and member of the city council (he later became the mayor, in 1772). He also ran a successful textile company, and wrote several other texts for works by Eberlin and Leopold Mozart (his cantatas Christus begraben and Christus verdammt, written in 1741 and 1743, respectively, were both set to music by the latter).

== Roles ==
Role	Voice type	Premiere cast, 12 March 1767
Gerechtigkeit, divine justice	soprano	Maria Anna Braunhofer
Christgeist, spirit of Christianity	tenor	Franz Anton Spitzeder
Barmherzigkeit, divine mercy	soprano	Maria Magdalena Lipp
Ein lauer und hinnach eifriger Christ, a half-hearted but later zealous Christian	tenor	Joseph Meissner
Weltgeist, worldliness	soprano	Maria Anna Fesemayer

== Musical numbers ==
1. Sinfonia Allegro
2. Recitativo: Die löblich' und gerechte Bitte
3. No. 1 Aria: Mit Jammer muß ich schauen (Christgeist)
4. Recitativo: So viele Seelen Fall
5. No. 2 Aria: Ein ergrimmter Löwe brüllet (Barmherzigkeit)
6. Recitativo: Was glaubst du?
7. No. 3 Aria: Erwache, fauler Knecht (Gerechtigkeit)
8. Recitativo: Er reget sich
9. Recitativo: Wie, wer erwecket mich?
10. No. 4 Aria: Hat der Schöpfer dieses Leben (Weltgeist)
11. Recitativo: Daß Träume Träume sind
12. No. 5 Aria: Jener Donnerworte Kraft (Christ)
13. Recitativo: Ist dieses, o so zweifle nimmermehr
14. No. 6 Aria: Schildre einen Philosophen (Weltgeist)
15. Recitativo: Wen hör' ich nun hier in der Nähe
16. No. 7 Aria: Manches Übel (Christgeist)
17. Recitativo: Er halt mich einem Kranken gleich
18. Recitativo: Hast du nunmehr erfahren
19. No. 8 Terzetto: Laßt mir eurer Gnade Schein (Barmherzigkeit, Gerechtigkeit, Christgeist)

== Music ==
Mozart conceived (as was customary) every aria in the form of the da capo aria (with the exception of nos. 2 and 6). As is evident in this work, the first section (A) is rather more drawn out and expansive than the contrasting second section (B). Musicologist Carolyn Gianturco notes the unusual competence and display of drama in regards to Wolfgang's age at the time of composition. She also mentions the appropriate and imaginative orchestration, using several examples:

- In the second aria, "Ein ergrimmter Löwe brüllet", Barmherzigkeit is describing a forest with lions and hunters; Mozart incorporated two solo horns in this aria to elicit the musical motifs of a hunting horn.
- A trombone is introduced in the accompanied recitative before Weltgeist's first aria, which is significant due to the instrument's association with death and Judgement (Mozart would also use the trombone in the quartet "Tuba mirum" from his Requiem in 1791, reflecting the sung text, as well as the finale of Don Giovanni).
- The dramatic chords, scales and arpeggios in the recitative that precedes "Erwache, fauler Knecht" is heavily reflective of the text as well; they appear whilst Christgeist speaks of das grässliche Geheul (the horrible cry). The musical mood changes as Christgeist alters his sentiment, and is accompanied by quieter strings.

Gianturco also points out that, despite Mozart's ambitious and demanding score, the Salzburg court orchestra was not very large. It consisted of ten to twelve violins and violas, two to three cellos, two to three bassoons, three French horns, three oboes (two of which doubled on flutes) and one trumpet.

Mozart's use of chromaticism, rhythm, ornamentation and harmony is also singled out by Gianturco. She covers, specifically, the dissonance used in "Jener Donnerworte Kraft", approaching this compositional technique from a highly interpretive perspective; the opening of said dissonances on the strong beats and delayed resolutions are reflective of the uneasiness that the Christian feels after hearing a voice inside of him which demands him to take accountability of his past. This is amplified by the further use of sevenths and diminished fifths throughout the number. His use of counterpoint is rather sparse, rendering the texture bare, but Giancarlo praises his simple yet effective use of unexpected chord progressions to build upon the work's harmonic structure.

== Autograph score ==
The autograph score of the work (as observed by Gianturco) shows very little signs of correction, with a consistent transcription of both the vocal and orchestral parts. There is evidence of occasional dynamic marks or clearer indication added by Leopold, but otherwise it appears that Wolfgang wrote it independently and effortlessly.

Sometime around 1799, the composer Johann Anton André purchased a large portion of Mozart's autograph scores (the Mozart-Nachlass) from his widow, Constanze, which included that of Die Schuldigkeit des ersten Gebots. The score was then bought from André by Prince Albert in 1841, who included part of the work in a performance on 8 May 1844:

[T]aken from the score of an oratorio composed by Mozart at the early age of ten years; which is in Prince Albert’s possession, in the composer’s own handwriting. There is in it something of affinity to Mozart’s maturer works. The melody is elegant and flowing, and the accompaniment by the stringed instruments at once light and spirited.

After Albert's death in 1861, Queen Victoria placed all of the manuscripts he acquired in the Royal Library, and the autograph score of Die Schuldigkeit des ersten Gebots was placed in storage in 1863. It is now part of the Royal Collection, in the Royal Archives, at Windsor Castle.

== Recordings ==
Die Schuldigkeit des ersten Gebots discography
Year	Barmherzigkeit Gerechtigkeit Weltgeist Christgeist Christ	Conductor Orchestra	Label
1978	Edith Mathis; Margaret Price; Lilian Sukis; Norbert Orth; Claes H. Ahnsjö	Wolfgang Sawallisch; Mozarteum-Orchester Salzburg	Voce Records
1980	Sylvia Geszty; Krisztina Laki; Arleen Auger; Werner Hollweg; Claes H. Ahnsjö	Roland Bader; Berliner Domkapelle	Schwann Musica Sacra
1989	Margaret Marshall; Ann Murray; Inga Nielsen; Hans Peter Blochwitz; Aldo Baldin	Sir Neville Marriner; Radio-Sinfonieorchester Stuttgart	Philips Classics
2012	Sarah Fox; Cora Burggraaf; Sophie Bevan; Andrew Kennedy; Allan Clayton	Ian Page; The Orchestra of Classical Opera	Signum Classics
2023	Adèle Charvet; Gwendoline Blondeel; Gwendoline Blondeel; Artavazd Sargsyan; Jordan Mouaïssia	Camille Delaforge; Ensemble Il Caravaggio	CVS

== See also ==
- Oratorio
- List of operas by Mozart
- Classical music written in collaboration
