= List of operas by Wolfgang Amadeus Mozart =

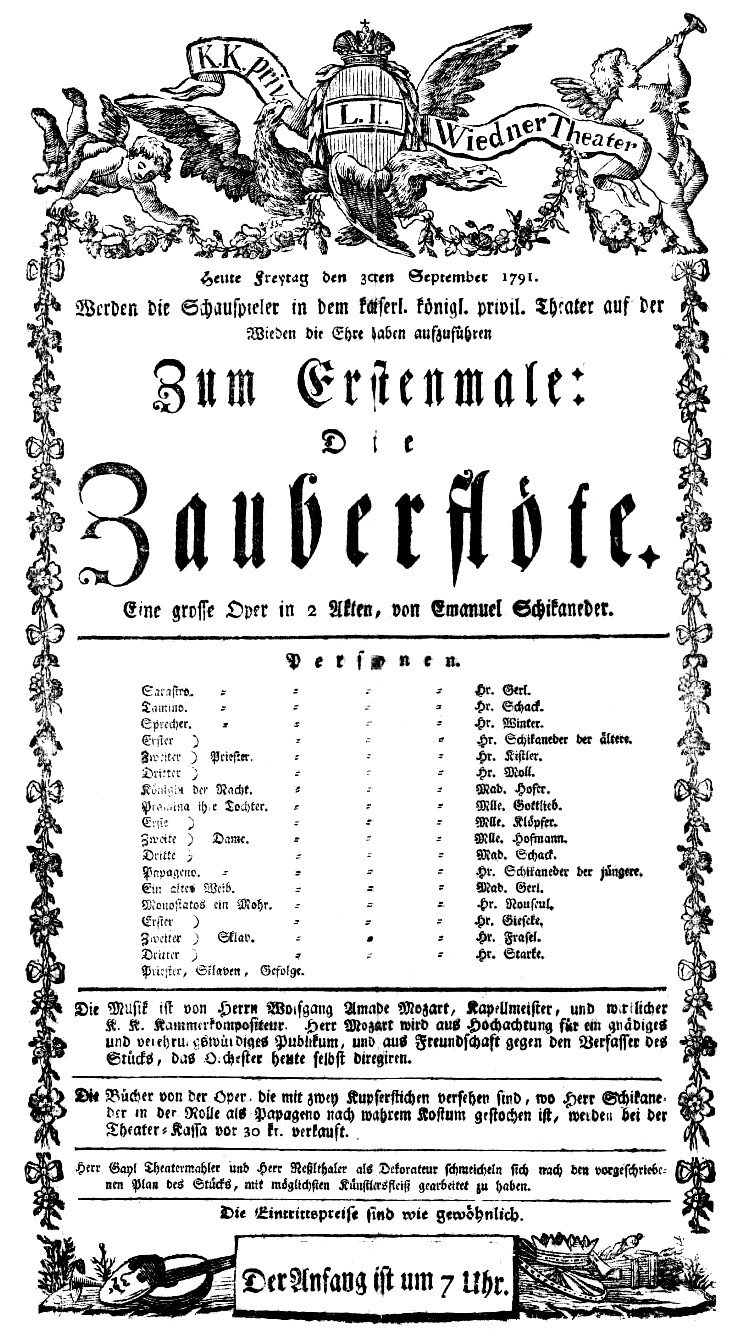
Playbill for the opening performance of Die Zauberflöte, 30 September 1791

Wolfgang Amadeus Mozart's operas comprise 23 musical dramas in a variety of genres. (Note: Excluding Der Stein der Weisen, for which Mozart wrote only one aria.) They range from the small-scale, derivative works of his youth to the full-fledged operas of his maturity. Three of the works were abandoned before completion and were not performed until many years after the composer's death. His mature works are all considered classics and have never been out of the repertory of the world's opera houses.

From a very young age, Mozart had, according to opera analyst David Cairns, "an extraordinary capacity ... for seizing on and assimilating whatever in a newly encountered style (was) most useful to him". In a letter to his father, dated 7 February 1778, Mozart wrote, "As you know, I can more or less adopt or imitate any kind and style of composition". He used this gift to break new ground, becoming simultaneously "assimilator, perfector and innovator". Thus, his early works follow the traditional forms of the Italian opera seria and opera buffa as well as the German Singspiel. In his maturity, according to music writer Nicholas Kenyon, he "enhanced all of these forms with the richness of his innovation", and, in Don Giovanni, he achieved a synthesis of the two Italian styles, including a seria character in Donna Anna, buffa characters in Leporello and Zerlina, and a mixed seria-buffa character in Donna Elvira. Unique among composers, Mozart ended all his mature operas, starting with Idomeneo, in the key of the overture.

Ideas and characterisations introduced in the early works were subsequently developed and refined. For example, Mozart's later operas feature a series of memorable, strongly drawn female characters, in particular the so-called "Viennese soubrettes" who, in opera writer Charles Osborne's phrase, "contrive to combine charm with managerial instinct". Music writer and analyst Gottfried Kraus has remarked that all these women were present, as prototypes, in the earlier operas; Bastienne (1768), and Sandrina (La finta giardiniera, 1775) are precedents for the later Constanze and Pamina, while Sandrina's foil Serpetta is the forerunner of Blonde, Susanna, Zerlina and Despina.

Mozart's texts came from a variety of sources, and the early operas were often adaptations of existing works. (Note: For example, Metastasio's text for Il re pastore had been written in 1751 and had been set to music before.) The first librettist chosen by Mozart himself appears to have been Giambattista Varesco, for Idomeneo in 1781. Five years later, he began his most enduring collaboration, with Lorenzo Da Ponte, his "true phoenix". The once widely held theory that Da Ponte was the librettist for the discarded Lo sposo deluso of 1783/84 has now been generally rejected. (Note: According to some recent scholarship, the unknown Italian poet responsible for the text is more likely to have been Giuseppe Petrosellini, who initially prepared it for Domenico Cimarosa's opera Le donne rivali, 1780.) Mozart felt that, as the composer, he should have considerable input into the content of the libretto, so that it would best serve the music. Musicologist Charles Rosen writes, "it is possible that Da Ponte understood the dramatic necessities of Mozart's style without prompting; but before his association with da Ponte, Mozart had already bullied several librettists into giving him the dramatically shaped ensembles he loved." (Note: For two instances in which Mozart coaxed his librettists into reshaping their work, see Die Entführung aus dem Serail (which quotes Mozart's correspondence on this point) and Varesco.)

== Compiling the list ==
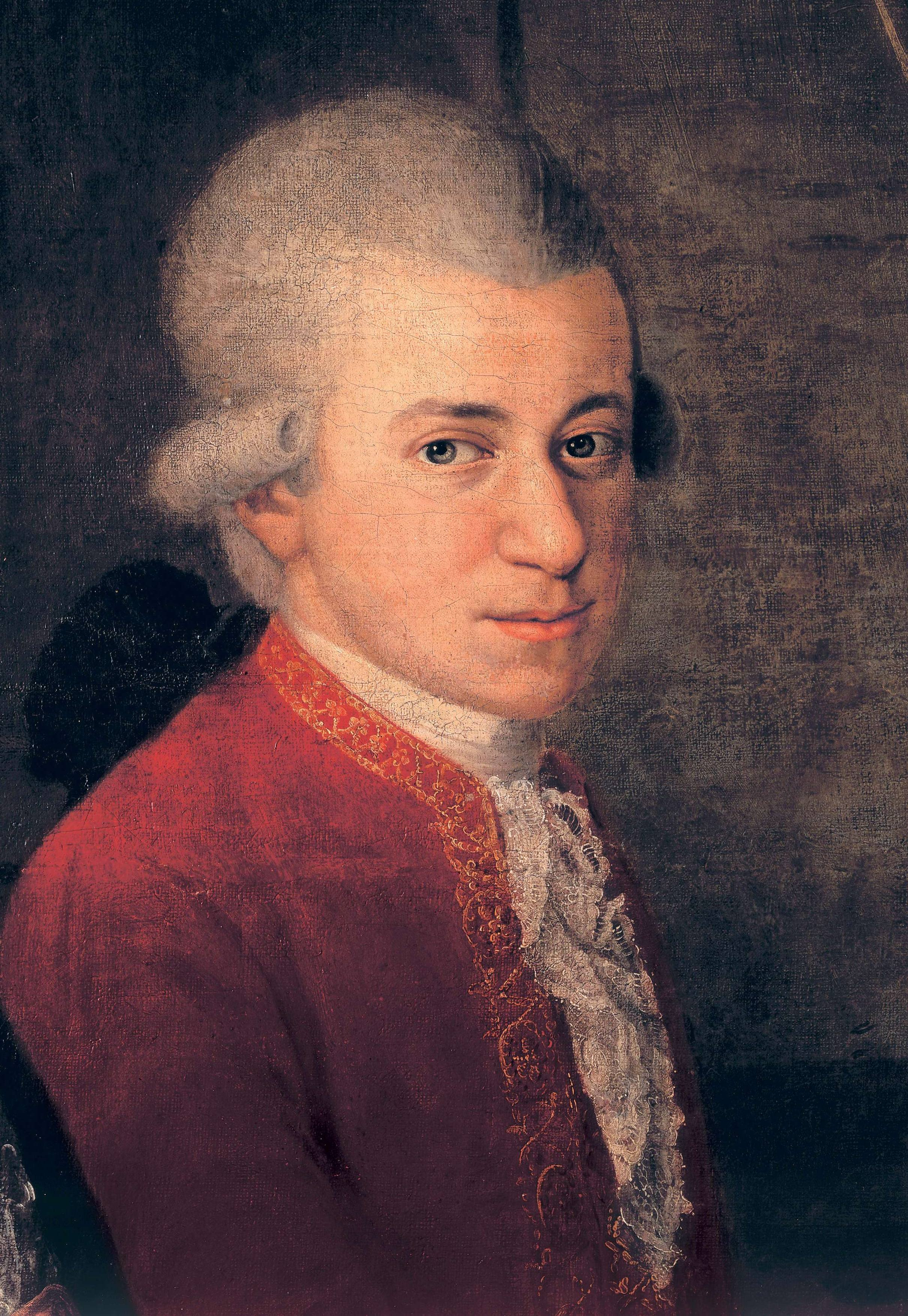
Detail of Wolfgang from the 1780–81 Portrait of the Mozart Family

=== Basis for inclusion ===
The list includes all the theatrical works generally accepted as composed by Wolfgang Amadeus Mozart. In this context "theatrical" means performed on a stage, by vocalists singing in character, in accordance with stage directions. Some sources have adopted more specific criteria, leading them to exclude the early "Sacred Singspiel" Die Schuldigkeit des ersten Gebots, (Note: "Gebotes" or "Gebottes" are archaic spelling variants of the modern "Gebots" which is regularly used in the title.) which they classify as an oratorio. (Note: Kenyon begins his guide to the operas with Apollo et Hyacinthus; Cairns more or less dismisses Die Schuldigkeit, seemingly following the view of Edward J. Dent, quoted by Osborne (1992, p. 27). Grove, also, does not list Die Schuldigkeit as an opera.) However, as Osborne makes clear, the libretto contains stage directions which suggest that the work was acted, not merely sung, and it is formally described as a "geistliches Singspiel" (sacred play with music), not as an oratorio. The Singspiel Der Stein der Weisen was written in collaboration with four other composers, so it is only partially credited to Mozart who only contributed one duet.

=== Sequence ===
In general, the list follows the sequence in which the operas were written. There is uncertainty about whether La finta semplice was written before or after Bastien und Bastienne, and in some listings the former is given priority. (Note: Both were written in 1768. The first performance of La finta semplice was delayed until May 1769, whereas Bastien und Bastienne may have been performed in October 1768. It is entirely possible, however, that La finta semplice was written first. See Osborne (1992, pp. 37–38, 45)) Thamos was written in two segments, the earlier in 1774, but is listed in accordance with its completion in 1779–80. Die Zauberflöte and La clemenza di Tito were written concurrently. Die Zauberflote was started earlier and put aside for the Tito commission, which was completed and performed first and is usually listed as the earlier work despite having a higher Köchel catalogue number.

== List of operas ==
Key: Incomplete opera Collaborative work

Operas by Wolfgang Amadeus Mozart
Period (Note: Period during which the opera was written)	Title	Genre and acts (Note: Unless indicated otherwise, these descriptions are taken from the title pages of Neue Mozart-Ausgabe. In instances where the English meaning is unclear, an English equivalent is given.)	Libretto		Voice parts (Note: Voice part summaries are as given by Osborne (1992). Additional notes indicate roles originally sung by castrati.)	Premiere (Note: Unless noted otherwise, details of first performances are as given by Osborne (1992).)		Köchel No. (Note: Köchel numbers refer to the Köchel Catalogue of Mozart's work, prepared by Ludwig von Köchel and first published in 1862. The catalogue has been revised several times, most recently in 1964. The first number refers to K^{1}, the original numbering; the second to K^{6} from 1964.)
Period	Title	Genre and acts	Lang.	Librettist (Note: Unless noted otherwise, librettist details are as given by Osborne (1992))	Voice parts	Date	Venue	Köchel No.
1766–67	Die Schuldigkeit des ersten Gebots, Part 1 (Note: Part 2 is by Michael Haydn, Part 3 by Anton Cajetan Adlgasser.) (The obligation of the first and foremost commandment)	Sacred Singspiel (collaboration)	German	Ignaz von Weiser (Note: Weiser is the most likely of several possible authors of the text; see Osborne (1992, pp. 24–25).)	3 soprano, 2 tenor	12 March 1767	Archbishop's Palace, Salzburg	K.35; Score; Libretto
1767	Apollo et Hyacinthus (Apollo and Hyacinth)	Music for a Latin drama	Latin	Rufinus Widl, after Ovid's Metamorphoses	2 treble, 2 boy alto, 1 tenor, 2 bass, chorus (Note: Premiered with an all-male cast, the soprano and alto parts being sung by boy choristers.)	13 May 1767	Great Hall, University of Salzburg	K.38; Score
1768	Bastien und Bastienne (Bastien and Bastienne)	Singspiel; 1 act	German	F. W. Weiskern, J. H. Muller and J. A. Schachtner (Note: The text was derived from a French parody, Les amours de Bastien et Bastienne, of a work by Jean-Jacques Rousseau: Le devin du village, 1752.)	1 soprano, 1 tenor, 1 bass	2 October 1890 (Note: Possibly Vienna, October 1768, in the garden of Dr Franz Mesmer). Dr Franz Anton Mesmer was the founder of the form of hypnotherapy known as "mesmerism".)	Architektenhaus, Wilhelmstraße 92, Berlin	K.50/46b; Score
1768	La finta semplice (The feigned simpleton)	Opera buffa 3 acts	Italian	Marco Coltellini, after Carlo Goldoni	3 soprano, 2 tenor, 2 bass	1 May 1769	Archbishop's Palace, Salzburg	K.51/46a; Score
1770	Mitridate, re di Ponto (Mithridates, King of Pontus)	Opera seria 3 acts	Italian	V. A. Cigna-Santi, based on G. Parini's translation of Racine's Mithridate	4 soprano, 1 alto, 2 tenor (Note: The soprano roles of Sifare and Arbate and the alto role of Farnace were written for castrati.)	26 December 1770	Teatro Regio Ducale, Milan	K.87/74a; Score
1771	Ascanio in Alba (Ascanius in Alba)	Festspiel (Note: In Italian this translates to festa teatrale. Osborne (1992, p. 63) calls it a "pastoral opera".); 2 acts	Italian	Giuseppe Parini	4 soprano, 1 tenor, chorus (Note: The soprano roles of Ascanio and Fauno were written for castrati.)	17 October 1771	Teatro Regio Ducale, Milan	K.111; Score
1771	Il sogno di Scipione (Scipio's Dream)	Azione teatrale or serenata drammatica 1 act	Italian	Metastasio, based on Cicero's Somnium Scipionis	3 soprano, 3 tenor, chorus	1 May 1772 (possibly) (Note: Details of first performance are obscure.Osborne (1992) gives dates "29 April or 1 May", Kenyon (2006, p. 296) says: "There is no record it was actually performed in 1772")	Archbishop's Palace, Salzburg	K.126; Score
1772	Lucio Silla	Dramma per musica 3 acts	Italian	Giovanni de Gamerra, revised by Metastasio	4 soprano, 2 tenor, chorus (Note: The soprano role of Cecilio was written for a castrato.)	26 December 1772	Teatro Regio Ducale, Milan	K.135; Score
1774–75	La finta giardiniera (The pretend garden-maid)	Dramma giocoso 3 acts (Note: Mozart prepared a Singspiel version, Die verstellte Gärtnerin, produced in Augsburg on 1 May 1780. The German version, now known as Die Gärtnerin aus Liebe, has remained popular.)	Italian	Probably Giuseppe Petrosellini (Note: The libretto was formerly credited to Ranieri de' Calzabigi, revised by Marco Coltellini, but is now credited to Petrosellini.)	4 soprano, 2 tenor, 1 bass, chorus (Note: The soprano role of Ramiro was written for a castrato.)	13 January 1775	Salvatortheater, Munich	K.196; Score
1775	Il re pastore (The Shepherd King)	Serenata; 2 acts	Italian	Metastasio, amended by Varesco, based on Tasso's Aminta	3 soprano, 2 tenor (Note: The soprano role of Aminta was written for castrato.)	23 April 1775	Archbishop's Palace, Salzburg	K.208; Score
1773, 1779	Thamos, König in Ägypten (Thamos, King of Egypt)	Incidental music (choruses and entr'actes for a heroic drama)	German	Tobias Philipp von Gebler	Soprano, alto, tenor, bass (chorus and soloists)	4 April 1774 (two choruses)	Kärntnertor Theatre, Vienna	K.345/336a; Score
1773, 1779	Thamos, König in Ägypten (Thamos, King of Egypt)	Incidental music (choruses and entr'actes for a heroic drama)	German	Tobias Philipp von Gebler	Soprano, alto, tenor, bass (chorus and soloists)	1779–80 (complete)	Salzburg	K.345/336a; Score
1779–80	Zaide	Singspiel (incomplete)	German	Johann Andreas Schachtner	1 soprano, 2 tenor, 2 bass, mini-chorus of 4 tenors, 1 speaking role	27 January 1866 (Note: Not performed during Mozart's lifetime.)	Frankfurt (Note: The exact location is unrecorded)	K.344/336b; Score
1780–81	Idomeneo, re di Creta (Idomeneus, King of Crete)	Dramma per musica 3 acts	Italian	Varesco, after Antoine Danchet's Idoménée	3 soprano, 1 mezzo-soprano, 4 tenor, 1 baritone, 2 bass, chorus (Note: The role of Idamante, originally written for castrato, was rewritten by Mozart as a tenor role in 1786.)	29 January 1781	Court Theatre (now Cuvilliés Theatre), Munich	K.366; Score
1781–82	Die Entführung aus dem Serail (The Abduction from the Seraglio)	Singspiel; 3 acts	German	Gottlieb Stephanie, based on C. Bretzner's Belmont und Constanze, oder Die Entführung aus dem Serail	2 soprano, 2 tenor, 1 bass, 2 speaking roles (Note: One speaking role, that of a sailor, is absent from most modern productions)	16 July 1782	Burgtheater, Vienna	K.384; Score; Libretto
1783	L'oca del Cairo (The goose of Cairo)	Dramma giocoso (incomplete); 3 acts	Italian	Varesco	(Provisional) 4 soprano, 2 tenor, 2 bass, chorus	6 June 1867	Théâtre des Fantaisies-Parisiennes, Paris	K.422; Score
1783	Lo sposo deluso (The Deluded Bridegroom) (Note: The full name of the opera is Lo sposo deluso, ossia La rivalità di tre donne per un solo amante (The Deluded Bridegroom, or The Rivalry of Three Women for One Lover))	Opera buffa (incomplete); 2 acts	Italian	Unknown. Once attributed to Da Ponte but may have been by Giuseppe Petrosellini.	(Provisional) 3 soprano, 2 tenor, 2 bass	6 June 1867	Théâtre des Fantaisies-Parisiennes, Paris	K.430/424a; Score
1786	Der Schauspieldirektor (The Impresario)	Comic singspiel 1 act	German	Gottlieb Stephanie	2 soprano, 1 tenor, 1 bass, 6 speaking roles	7 February 1786	Schönbrunn Palace, Vienna	K.486; Score
1785–86	Le nozze di Figaro (The Marriage of Figaro)	Opera buffa 4 acts	Italian	Da Ponte, based on Beaumarchais's La folle journée, ou le Mariage de Figaro	5 soprano, 2 tenor, 1 baritone, 3 bass, chorus (Note: Two soprano soloists from the chorus sing the duet of the servant girls, "Amanti, costanti" in the act 3 finale.)	1 May 1786	Burgtheater, Vienna	K.492; Score; Libretto
1787	Don Giovanni (Note: The full name of the opera is Il dissoluto punito, ossia Il Don Giovanni, but as Kenyon (2006, p. 326) states: "It is fruitless to argue against the habits of opera houses around the world".)	Dramma giocoso 2 acts	Italian	Da Ponte, based on Giovanni Bertati's Don Giovanni Tenorio	3 soprano, 1 tenor, 1 baritone, 3 bass, chorus	29 October 1787 (Note: For the Vienna premiere, six months later, certain changes were introduced, mainly to accommodate the ranges of a different group of singers. Modern performances generally conflate the Prague and Vienna productions.)	Estates Theatre, (Note: Also known as Nostitz-Theater and Tyl theatre) Prague	K.527; Score; Libretto
1789–90	Così fan tutte (Women are like that or All women do that) (Note: This is an approximate translation from the Italian. Cairns (2006, p. 177) gives: "That is what all women do". The subtitle, La scuola degli amanti, is more easily translatable as "The School for lovers".)	Dramma giocoso 2 acts	Italian	Da Ponte	3 soprano, 1 tenor, 1 baritone, 1 bass, chorus	26 January 1790	Burgtheater, Vienna	K.588; Score; Libretto
1790	Der Stein der Weisen (The Philosopher's Stone) (Pasticcio composed with J. B. Henneberg, F. Gerl, B. Schack and E. Schikaneder)	Singspiel (collaboration); 2 acts	German	Emanuel Schikaneder	3 soprano, 2 tenor, 2 baritone, 1 bass, 1 speaking role	11 September 1790	Theater auf der Wieden, Vienna	K.592a (duet "Nun, liebes Weibchen, ziehst mit mir") (Score)
1791	La clemenza di Tito (The clemency of Titus)	Opera seria 2 acts	Italian	Caterino Mazzolà, after Metastasio	2 soprano, 2 mezzo-soprano, 1 tenor, 1 bass, chorus (Note: The role of Sesto was originally written by Mozart for a tenor before he found out it had been assigned to a castrato.)	6 September 1791	Estates Theatre, Prague	K.621; Score; Libretto
1791	Die Zauberflöte (The Magic Flute)	Singspiel; 2 acts	German	Emanuel Schikaneder	6 soprano, 2 mezzo-soprano, 1 alto, 4 tenor, 1 baritone, 4 bass, chorus	30 September 1791	Theater auf der Wieden, Vienna	K.620; Score; Libretto

== Notes and references ==
=== Sources ===
- András Batta (editor) (2000). Opera: Composers, Works, Performers (English ed.). Cologne: Könemann. ISBN 3-8290-3571-3
- Cairns, David (2006). Mozart and his Operas. London: Penguin Books. ISBN 0-14-029674-3.
- Dell'Antonio, Andrew (1996). "Il Compositore Deluso: The Fragments of Mozart's Comic Opera Lo Sposo Deluso (K424a/430)". In Stanley Sadie (ed.). Wolfgang Amadé Mozart: Essays on His Life and Work. London: Oxford University Press. ISBN 0-19-816443-2.
- Holden, Anthony (2007). The Man Who Wrote Mozart: The extraordinary life of Lorenzo Da Ponte. London: Phoenix. ISBN 978-0-7538-2180-0.
- Kenyon, Nicholas (2006). The Pegasus Pocket Guide to Mozart. New York: Pegasus Books. ISBN 1-933648-23-6.
- Levin, Robert (27 November 2008). "Musing on Mozart and Studying with Boulanger". The Boston Musical Intelligencer.
- Osborne, Charles (1992). The Complete Operas of Mozart. London: Victor Gollancz. ISBN 0-575-03823-3.
- Rosen, Charles (1997). The Classical Style: Haydn, Mozart, Beethoven. New York: Norton. ISBN 0-393-00653-0.
- Webster, James (2017). John A. Rice (ed.). Essays on Opera, 1750–1800. Ashgate Library of Essays in Opera Studies (reprint ed.). Routledge. ISBN 9781351567886.
