= Thamos, King of Egypt =

Play by Tobias Philipp

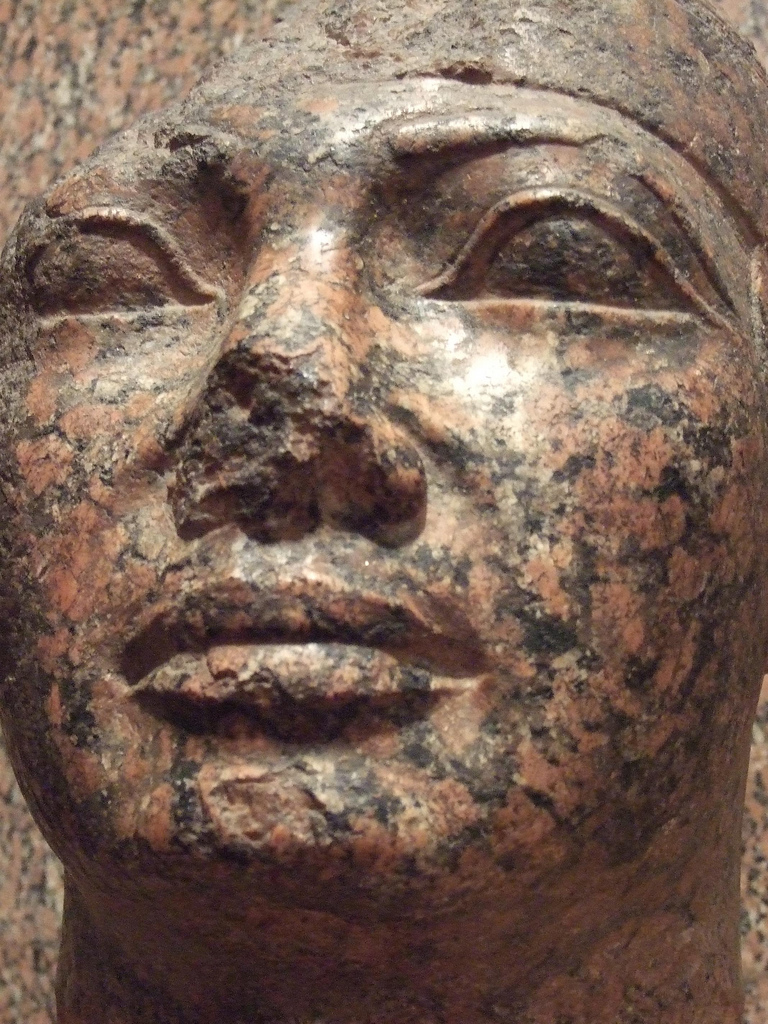
Statue of Sethos, the only role Mozart named for the play

Thamos, King of Egypt (or King Thamos; in German, Thamos, König in Ägypten) is a play by Tobias Philipp von Gebler, for which, between 1773 and 1780, Wolfgang Amadeus Mozart wrote incidental music, K. 345/336a, of an operatic character.

The autograph manuscript of the work is preserved in the Berlin State Library.

== Early performances ==
It is not known for certain whether the music that Mozart composed was performed with the play during his lifetime. The play's première took place at the Kärntnertortheater in Vienna, probably on 4 April 1774, by which time two choruses had been written. Performances in Salzburg in 1776 and 1779-80 may have incorporated the orchestral interludes and the three choruses in their final form, respectively. The music was re-used in 1783 in a different play (set in India, not Egypt), Lanassa, by Karl Martin Plümicke.

== Roles ==
The only named role in Mozart's music is Sethos, the high priest (baritone). There are parts for four other soloists (soprano, alto, tenor and bass) and for a chorus of priests and priestesses.

== Synopsis ==
Thamos has succeeded his father, Ramesses, as king of Egypt, but Ramesses had usurped the throne from the rightful king, Menes, who is now disguised as the high priest, Sethos. Thamos loves Sais, a priestess, but she is really Menes' daughter Tharsis, for whom the high priestess Mirza is plotting marriage to Pheron, a treacherous general. When Menes reveals his true identity, Pheron is struck by lightning and Mirza kills herself. Menes cedes his crown to Thamos and Tharsis as all ends happily.

== Literary sources ==
King Thamos is an imaginary character, but it is likely his character was inspired by Thamus, mythical Pharaoh of Upper Egypt mentioned by Socrates in the Platonic dialogue Phaedrus.

== Musical numbers ==
Act 1

- Chorus: "Schon weichet dir, Sonne" (Maestoso)
- Interlude (Maestoso-Allegro)

Act 2

- Interlude (Andante)

Act 3

- Interlude (Allegro)

Act 4

- Interlude (Allegro Vivace Assai)

Act 5

- Chorus and soloists: "Gottheit, über alle mächtig!" (Allegro Moderato)
- Chorus with solo for Sethos: "Ihr Kinder des Staubes, erzittert"

== Recordings ==
The following list shows the discography of the work either in its entirety, with soloists, choir and orchestra, or shortened/cut versions:

- Ruthilde Boesch, Ilse Hollweg, Maria Nussbaumer-Knoflach, Waldemar Kmentt, Walter Berry, Wiener Kammerchor, Wiener Symphoniker conducted by Bernhard Paumgartner (mono recording from 1955 for the Mozart Anniversary Edition on Philips Records).
- London Symphony Orchestra conducted by Peter Maag (recording of the orchestral interludes only from 1968 on Decca Records).
- Charlotte Lehmann, Rose Scheible, Oly Pfaff, Bruce Abel, Vokalensemble Heilbronn, Württemberg Chamber Orchestra conducted by Jörg Faerber (originally released on Turnabout in 1977, then on the parent label VOX).
- Karin Eickstaedt, Gisela Pohl, Eberhard Büchner, Theo Adam, Hermann Christian Polster, Solistenvereinigung des Berliner Rundfunks, Staatskapelle Berlin conducted by Bernhard Klee (recording of the complete incidental music from 1975 for Philips Records. Reissued in 1991 as part of Volume 25 of The Complete Mozart Edition, it's regarded as the reference recording).
- Thomas Thomaschke, Janet Perry, Anne-Marie Mühle, Marius van Altena, Harry van der Kamp, Netherlands Chamber Choir, Collegium Vocale (dir. Philippe Herreweghe), Royal Concertgebouw Orchestra conducted by Nikolaus Harnoncourt (1981 recording of the complete score on Teldec).
- Robert Holl, Salzburger Kammerchor, Mozarteum-Orchester Salzburg conducted by Leopold Hager (1982 recording of a cut score on Deutsche Grammophon).
- Alastair Miles, The Monteverdi Choir, English Baroque Soloists conducted by Sir John Eliot Gardiner (1993 recording of the complete score, including revised versions of Nos. 1, 6 and 7 from 1779–80, ergo making it the most complete and comprehensive recording of the work in its entirety).

== See also ==
- List of Mozart's operas
