= Il re pastore =

1775 opera by Wolfgang Amadeus Mozart

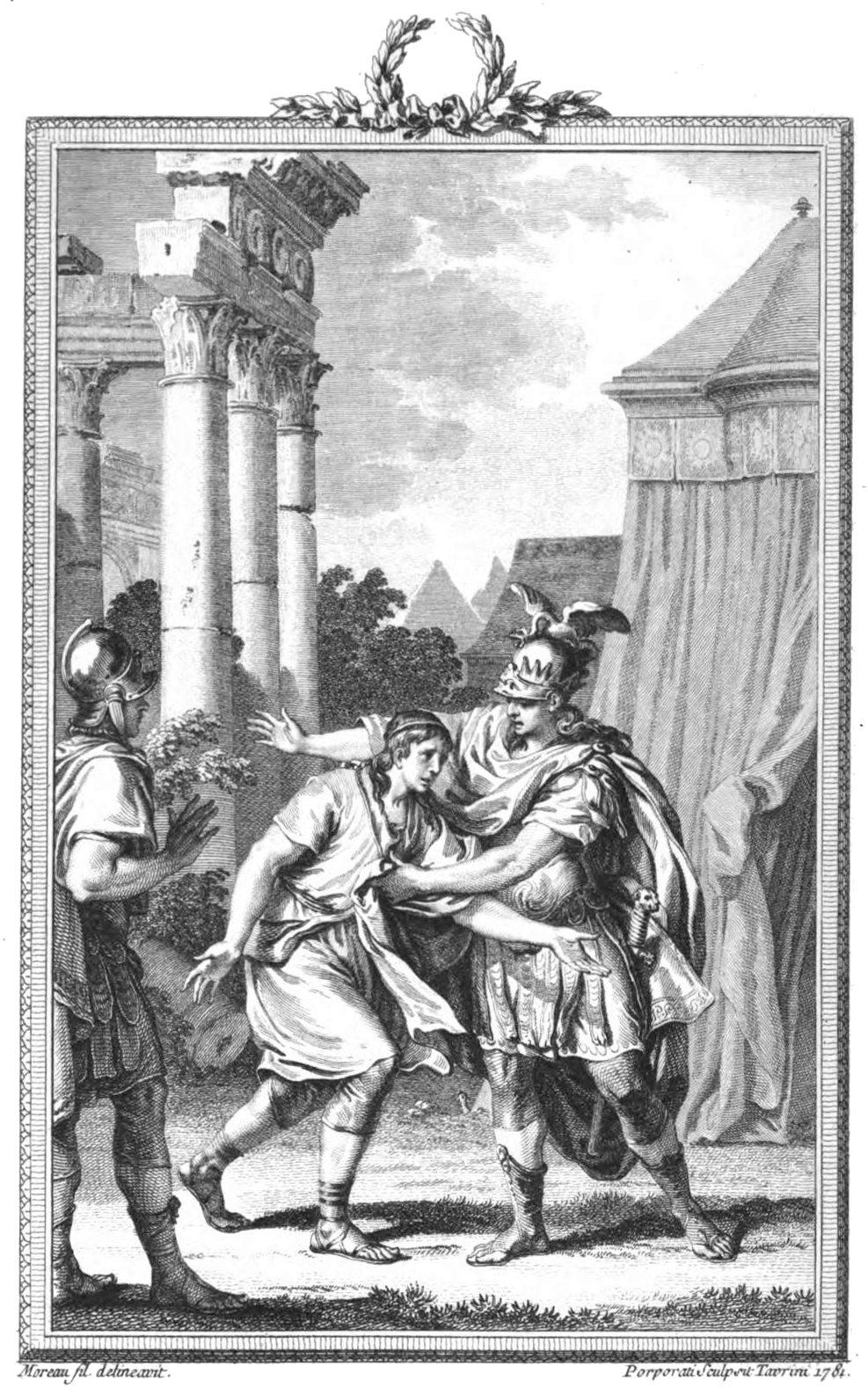
- 1780 illustration of a scene
- Librettist: Pietro Metastasio
- Language: Italian
- Based on: Aminta by Torquato Tasso
- Premiere: 23 April 1775; Archbishop's Palace, Salzburg

Il re pastore (The Shepherd King) is an opera, K. 208, written by Wolfgang Amadeus Mozart to an Italian libretto by Pietro Metastasio, edited by Giambattista Varesco. It is an opera seria within the pastoral genre. The opera was first performed on 23 April 1775 in Salzburg in the Rittersaal (knight's hall) of the Residenz-Theater in the palace of the Archbishop Count Hieronymus von Colloredo.

In 1775 the opera was commissioned for a visit by the Archduke Maximilian Francis of Austria, the youngest son of Empress Maria Theresa, to Salzburg. Mozart spent six weeks working on the opera. It consists of two acts and runs for approximately 107 minutes.

Metastasio wrote the libretto in 1751, basing it on a work by Torquato Tasso called Aminta. The libretto was picked up when Mozart (just 19 at the time) and his father saw a performance of it set to music composed by Felice Giardini – Mozart's version, however was two acts rather than Giardini's three, and has a few substantial changes. Each act lasts for around an hour in performance. The Salzburg court chaplain Varesco was largely responsible for this editing of Metastasio's libretto.

It is often referred to not as an opera, but as a serenata, a type of dramatic cantata. The appearance of a quartet of lovers (Aminta and Elisa, Agenore and Tamiri) of somewhat dubious fidelity automatically puts a modern audience in mind of the later Così fan tutte. The principal psychological theme of the opera is, however, the demands of love against the demands of kingship, as Aminta, the shepherd-king, tussles with his conscience, and in this Il re pastore is closer in theme to Idomeneo than any other of Mozart's operas. Indeed, Idomeneo was the next completed opera that Mozart wrote after Il re pastore, after his six-year-long break from the stage. Furthermore, the theme of qualities for kingship appears in another opera, La clemenza di Tito, his last one.

== Roles ==
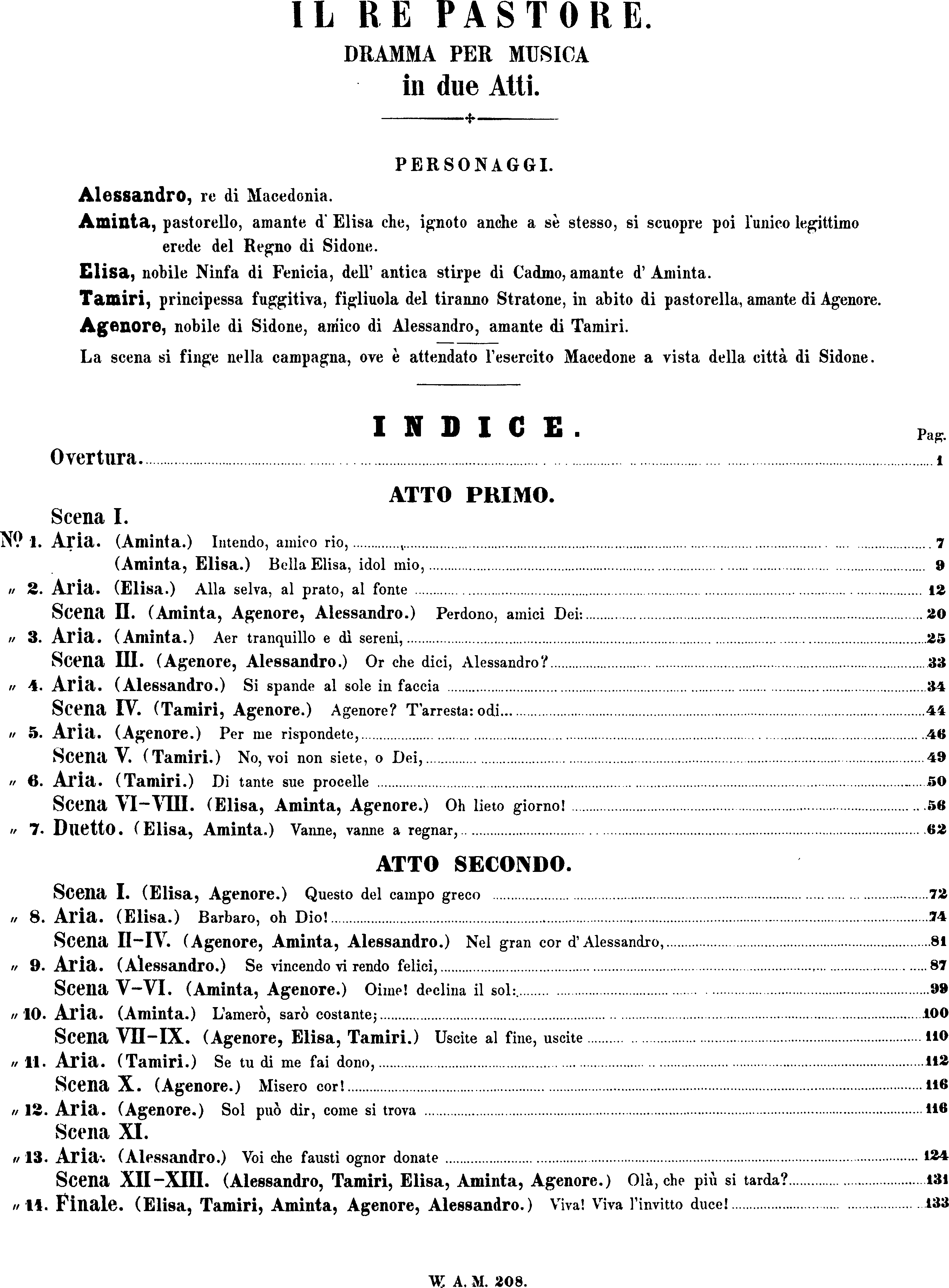
The Personaggi and Indice pages of Mozart's 1775 staging

Roles, voice types, premiere cast
Role	Voice type	Premiere cast, 23 April 1775 Conductor: W. A. Mozart
Aminta, a shepherd, rightful heir to Sidon	soprano castrato	Tommaso Consoli
Elisa, Phoenician shepherdess	soprano	Maria Anna Fesemayr
Tamiri, daughter of the deposed tyrant, Stratone	soprano	Maria Magdalena Lipp (Note: Maria Magdalena Lipp was married to Michael Haydn. She had also created the role of Barmherzigkeit (Divine Mercy) in Mozart's first musical play, Die Schuldigkeit des ersten Gebots to which her husband had contributed the second part (now lost).)/Maria Anna Braunhofer (Note: Some sources give Braunhofer for this role.)
Agenore, Sidonian aristocrat	tenor	Felix Hofstätter
Alessandro, King of Macedonia	tenor	Franz Anton Spitzeder

== Synopsis ==
The king of Macedonia, Alessandro, has overthrown Stratone, the tyrant of Sidon, but aims to find the rightful king.

=== Act 1 ===
In a meadow. The city of Sidon can be seen from a distance.

Elisa is with her lover Aminta, the shepherd. She assures him that the war between King Alessandro and Stratone, the tyrant of Sidon, will not affect their love for each other. Having deposed Stratone, Alessandro searches for the rightful heir to Sidon. He thinks that Aminta is the rightful heir. He comes to Aminta in disguise and offers him to take him to Alessandro. Aminta wants to remain a shepherd. Meantime, Agenore encounters his beloved Tamiri, daughter of Stratone. Tamiri is comforted to learn that Agenore still loves her.

Elisa gets permission from her father to marry Aminta. Aminta tells Elisa that he is the rightful heir to the throne and that his father was driven out by Stratone when he was a baby. Aminta promises to return to Elisa after claiming his throne. Aminta loves Elisa but Alessandro suggests that when Aminta is hailed king, royal duties take precedence over love. Alessandro suggests that Tamiri marry Aminta in order to ascend her father's throne. Aminta disagrees.

=== Act 2 ===
Macedonian Camp.

Elisa is prevented by Agenore from seeing Aminta. He also discourages Aminta from pursuing her. Alessandro tells Aminta to dress like a king so he can be presented to his subjects. He also decides that Tamiri marry Aminta. Aminta is distraught. Agenore is upset. He breaks the news to Elisa. Tamiri does not want to marry Aminta. Agenore, too, is tormented by the planned marriage. Tamiri tells Alessandro that she and Agenore are in love. The women throw themselves onto Alessandro's mercy. Elisa begs him to give her back Aminta who declares his love for Elisa ("L'amerò, sarò costante" / I shall love her, I shall be constant). Realizing the potential injustice he was about to inflict, Alessandro tells Aminta to marry Elisa and Tamiri to marry Agenore. Aminta is crowned king of Sidon.

== Noted arias ==
Act 1

- "Intendo, amico rio" – Aminta
- "Alla selva, al prato" – Elisa
- "Aer tranquillo e di sereni" – Aminta
- "Si spande al sole in faccia" – Alessandro
- "Per me rispondete" – Agenore
- "Di tante sue procelle" – Tamiri

Act 2

- "Barbaro! oh Dio mi vedi" – Elisa
- "Se vincendo vi rendo felici" – Alessandro
- "L'amerò, sarò costante" – Aminta
- "Se tu di me fai dono" – Tamiri
- "Sol può dir come si trova" – Agenore
- "Voi che fausti ognor donati" – Alessandro

== Recordings ==
- 1952 – Agnes Giebel (Aminta), Käthe Nentwig (Elisa), Hetty Plümacher (Tamiri), Albert Weikenmeier (Alessandro), Werner Hohmann (Agenore), Stuttgarter Tonstudio Orchester, Gustav Lund (Period Records).
- 1967 – Reri Grist (Aminta), Lucia Popp (Elisa), Arlene Saunders (Tamiri), Luigi Alva (Alessandro), Nicola Monti (Agenore), Orchestra of Naples, Denis Vaughan (RCA Records).
- 1974 – Edith Mathis (Aminta), Arleen Augér (Elisa), Sona Ghazarian (Tamiri), Peter Schreier (Alessandro), Werner Krenn (Agenore), Mozarteum-Orchester Salzburg, Leopold Hager (Deutsche Grammophon).
- 1989 – Angela Maria Blasi (Aminta), Sylvia McNair (Elisa), Iris Vermillion (Tamiri), Jerry Hadley (Alessandro), Claes-Håkan Ahnsjö (Agenore), Academy of St. Martin in the Fields, Sir Neville Marriner (Philips Classics).
- 1995 – Ann Murray (Aminta), Eva Mei (Elisa), Inga Nielsen (Tamiri), Roberto Saccà (Alessandro), Markus Schäfer (Agenore), Concentus Musicus Wien, Nikolaus Harnoncourt (Teldec).
- 2001 – Johannette Zomer (Aminta), Francine van der Heyden (Elisa), Claudia Patacca (Tamiri), Alexei Grigorev (Alessandro), Marcel Reijans (Agenore), Musica ad Rhenum, Jed Wentz (Brilliant Classics).
- 2006 – Annette Dasch (Aminta), Marlis Petersen (Elisa), Arpiné Rahdjian (Tamiri), Kresimir Spicer (Alessandro), Andreas Karasiak (Agenore), Balthasar-Neumann-Ensemble, Thomas Hengelbrock (DVD; Deutsche Grammophon).
- 2014 – Sarah Fox (Aminta), Ailish Tynan (Elisa), Anna Devin (Tamiri), john Mark Ainsley (Alessandro), Benjamin Hulett (Agenore), The Orchestra of Classical Opera, Ian Page (Signum Classics).
