= Anton Cajetan Adlgasser =

German organist and composer (1729–1777)

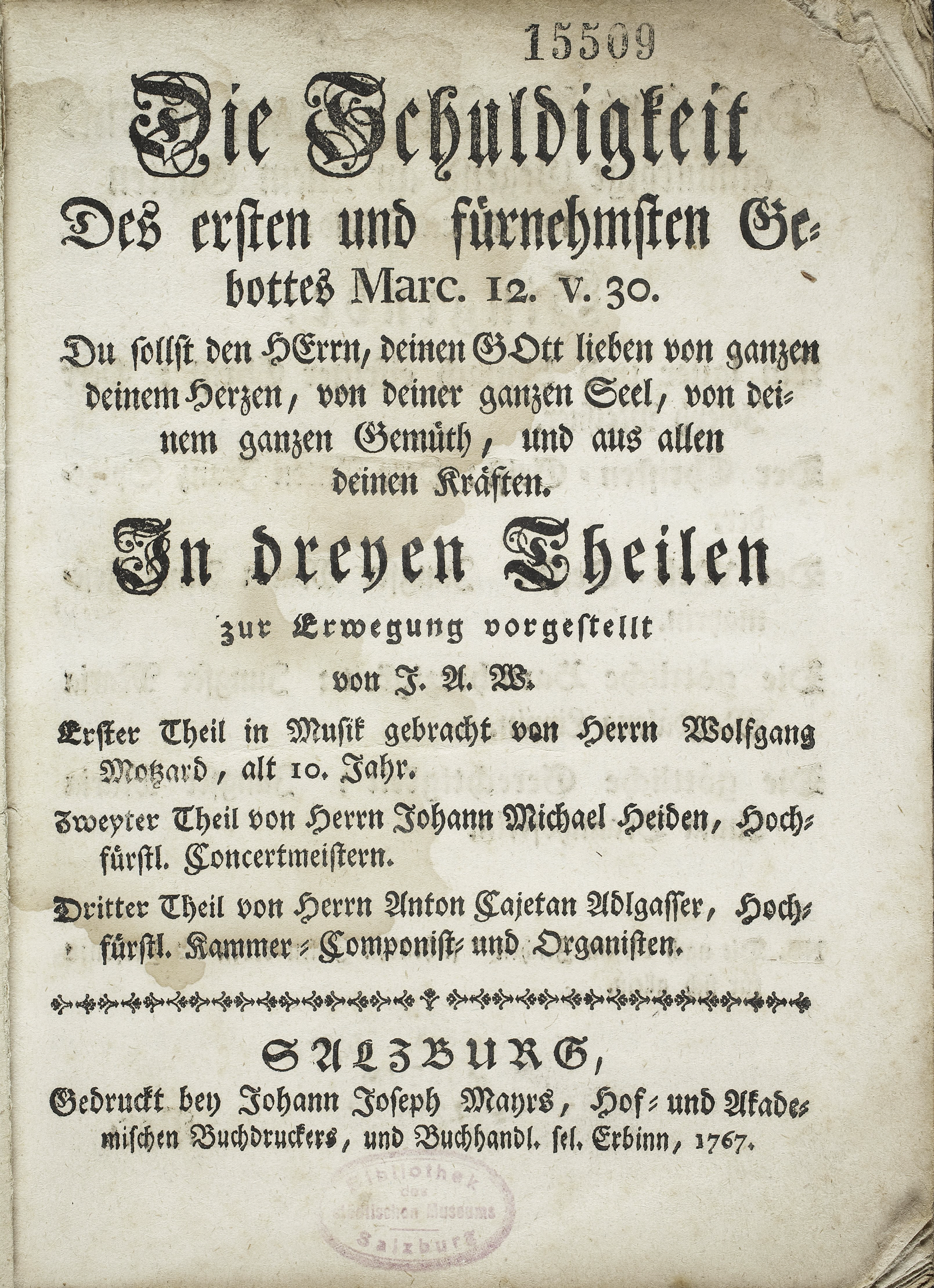
Title page of the oratorio Die Schuldigkeit des ersten Gebots, which Adlgasser wrote with Mozart and Michael Haydn.

Anton Cajetan Adlgasser (sometimes Adelgasser; 1 October 1729 – 23 December 1777) was a German organist and composer at Salzburg Cathedral. He composed a good deal of liturgical music that included eight masses and two requiems, as well as oratorios and orchestral and keyboard works.

Born in Inzell, Bavaria, he moved to Salzburg where he studied under Johann Ernst Eberlin. In 1750 he became the organist at the Salzburg Cathedral where he remained for the rest of his life. After a visit to Italy in 1764–65, he set Metastasio's only opera La Nitteti. It was performed in Salzburg in 1767. Also in 1767, he collaborated with Mozart and Michael Haydn on the oratorio Die Schuldigkeit des ersten Gebots ('The Obligation of the First Commandment').

Adlgasser's first marriage, in 1752, was to Maria Josepha, the daughter of his predecessor, J. E. Eberlin, at Salzburg Cathedral. Four years later he married Maria Barbara Schwab, and in 1769 the court singer Maria Anna Fesemayer (1743 – 1782), who sang in Die Schuldigkeit and created the role of Ninetta in La finta semplice. Leopold Mozart stood witness to the third wedding.

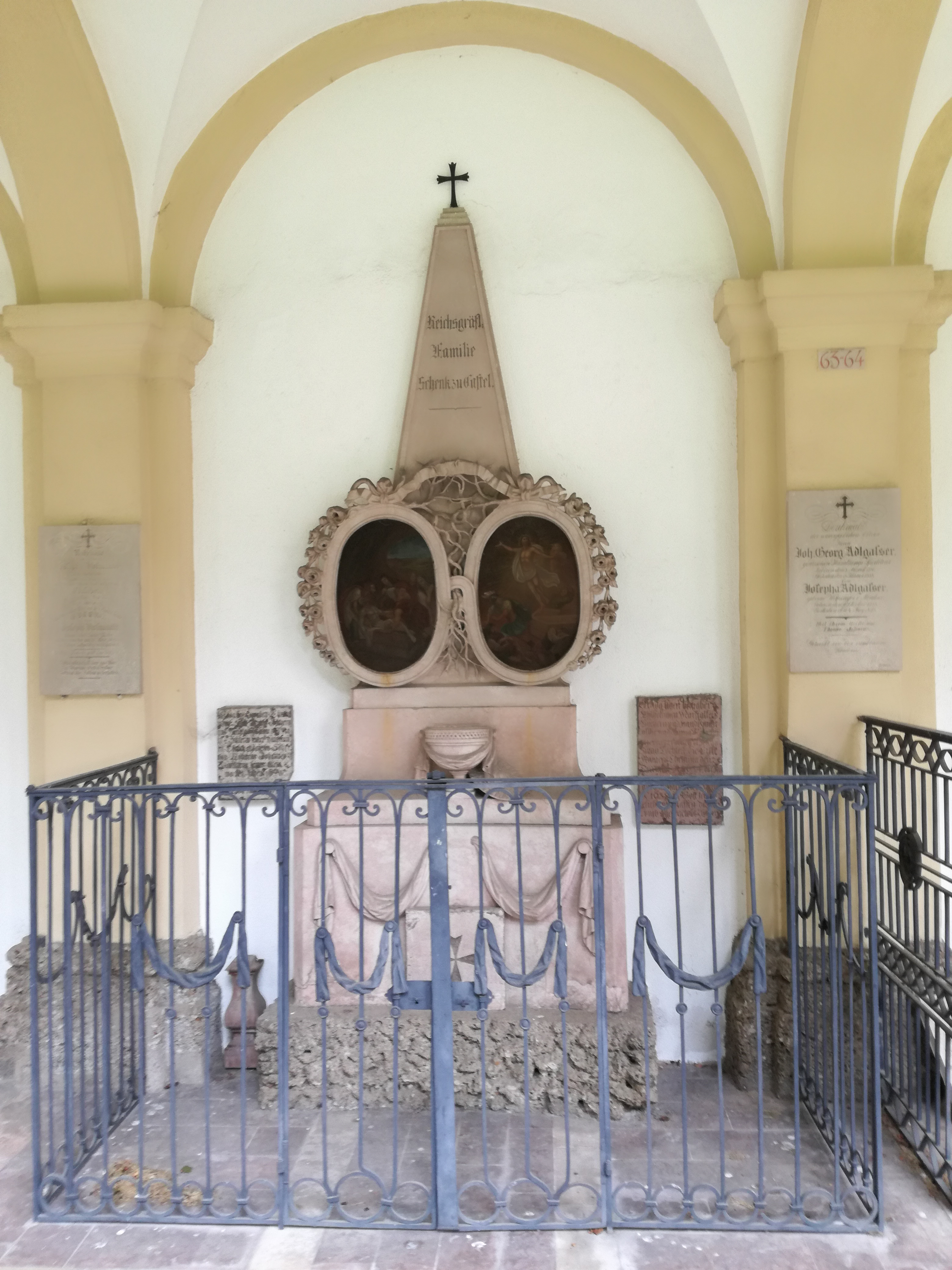
Adlgasser family tomb, Salzburg

In 1777 he died of a stroke while playing the organ in Salzburg.
