= Franz Anton Spitzeder =

Austrian opera singer

Franz Anton Spitzeder (1735–1796) was a German tenor and keyboard teacher.

Spitzeder was born in Traunstein and educated in Salzburg, where in 1759 he found employment as a court singer. He sang the part of Der Christgeist (The Christian Spirit) in the premiere of Mozart's Die Schuldigkeit des ersten Gebots and created the role of Don Polidoro in La finta semplice and the role of Alessandro in Il re pastore. He died near Aigen.
