= Maria Anna Fesemayr =

Austrian opera singer

Maria Anna Fesemayr (sometimes spelled Fesemayer) (1743–1782) was a Salzburg court singer, who sang in Mozart's Die Schuldigkeit des ersten Gebots and created the role of Ninetta in La finta semplice and the role of Elisa in Il re pastore. She was the third wife of the composer and organist Anton Cajetan Adlgasser. Leopold Mozart was a witness at their wedding.
