= La finta semplice =

1768 opera by Wolfgang Amadeus Mozart

- Opera buffa by W. A. Mozart
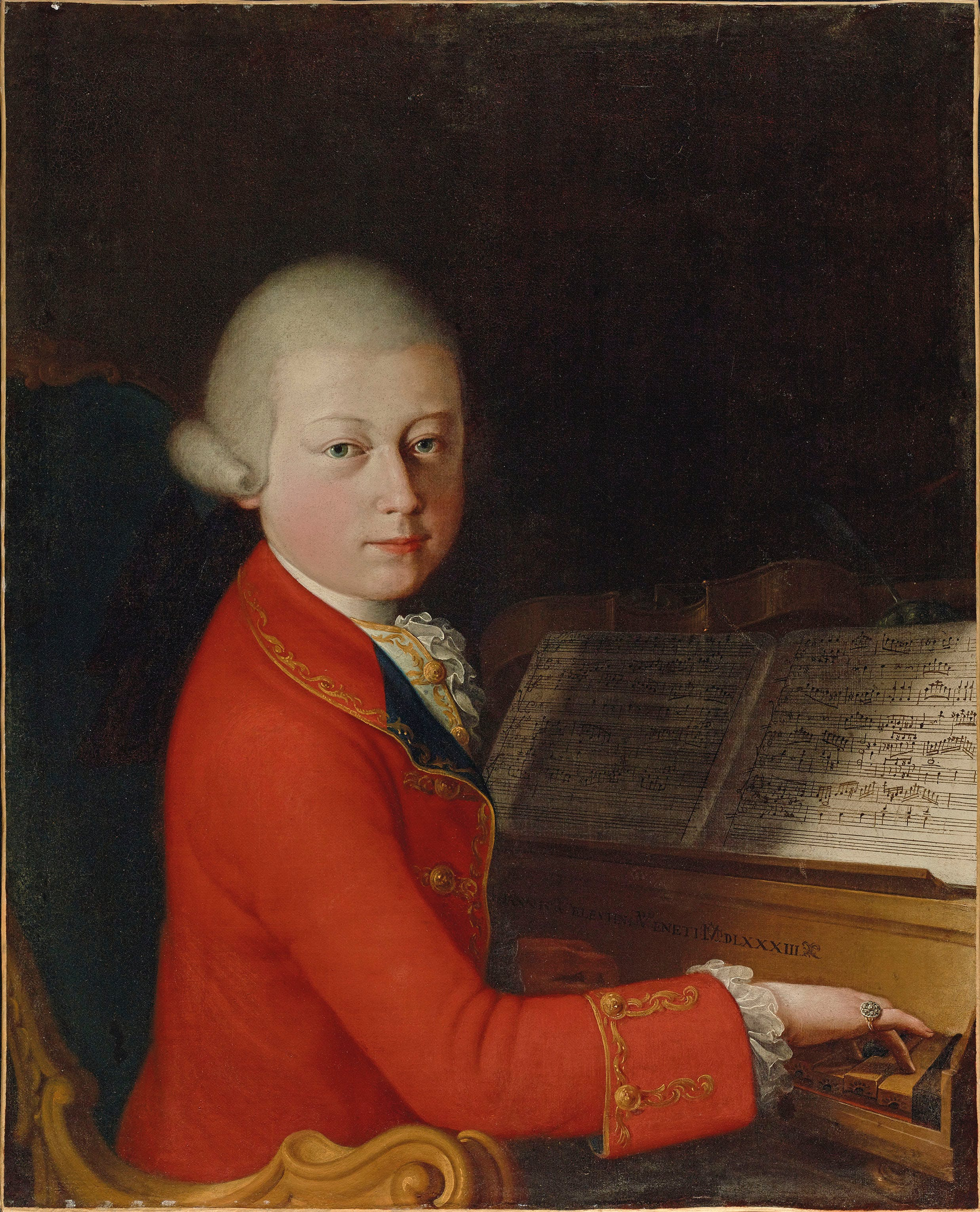
- 1770 Verona portrait of Mozart
- Librettist: Marco Coltellini
- Language: Italian
- Based on: La finta semplice by Carlo Goldoni
- Premiere: 1 May 1769; Archbishop's Palace, Salzburg

La finta semplice (The Fake Innocent), K. 51 (46a) is an opera buffa in three acts for seven voices and orchestra, composed in 1768 by then 12-year-old Wolfgang Amadeus Mozart. Young Mozart and his father Leopold were spending the year in Vienna, where Leopold was trying to establish his son as an opera composer. He was acting on a suggested request from the Emperor Joseph II that the young boy should write an opera.

Leopold chose an Italian libretto by the Vienna court poet Marco Coltellini, which was based on an early work by Carlo Goldoni. During rehearsals, the opera was the victim of intrigues from competing composers claiming that the work was not from the 12-year-old boy, but from his father. Threatened with a sabotaged first night by the impresario Giuseppe Affligio, Leopold prudently decided to withdraw. The opera was never staged in Vienna. It was probably performed the following year in Salzburg at the request of the Prince-Archbishop.

Mozart produced a full score of three acts, 26 numbers, in a manuscript of 558 pages. It includes an overture/Sinfonia, one coro, one duet, three ensembles (at the end of each act), and 21 arias.

The opera was recorded in its entirety by Leopold Hager for Orfeo in January 1983 with Helen Donath and Teresa Berganza, a performance lasting two hours 45 minutes. Another recording was made in November 1989, with Barbara Hendricks and Ann Murray, and conducted by Peter Schreier. This version was selected by Philips to be part of The Complete Mozart Edition of all the works of Mozart, published in 1991.

However, since its premiere in 1769, the opera was not staged until modern times. It was given in March 1985 at the Bloomsbury Theatre as part of the Camden Festival conducted by Nicholas Cleobury, directed by Robert Carsen, with Patricia Rozario, Glenn Winslade and Janis Kelly among the cast. It was performed at the 2006 Salzburg Festival, as part of the production of all of 22 Mozart's operas. The performances were published in the collection of DVDs known as M-22 by Deutsche Grammophon.

== Composition history ==
The opera was something of a temporary career setback for Mozart, amid a childhood otherwise characterized by universal success and stardom. The instigation of the work was a suggestion made by Emperor Joseph II to Mozart's father Leopold during a visit made to the Imperial capital of Vienna by the Mozart family (10 January 1768 to the end of December 1768). Leopold wanted to promote the exceptional talent of young Mozart with the hope of establishing him as an opera composer.

The Emperor suggested to Leopold that Wolfgang write an opera for performance in Vienna to show his remarkable skills to the Viennese public as he had already done all over Europe.

Leopold needed a good libretto, and he had the choice between seria and buffa. He noted that the seria singers available in Milan were mediocre, while the buffa singers were excellent. "There are no singers here for serious opera. Even Gluck's tragic opera Alceste was performed entirely by opera buffa singers. He too is now writing an opera buffa " (30 January 1768). Leopold thus chose a buffa libretto, and for so doing, he simply went to the established librettist in Vienna, who happened to be the Florentine Marco Coltellini, an Italian "poet" who was to replace Metastasio as "poeta cesareo" at the Imperial court of the Habsburgs in 1769.

Together they selected a libretto by Goldoni, the master of the commedia dell'arte genre. Coltellini modified the libretto somewhat, especially act 3. He abandoned some arias, replaced a few with his own, and in some cases, kept the original Goldoni aria in the scene while adding a new one of his own, with the result that a few scenes ended up with two arias instead of one, as was the norm, usually coming at the end of the scene. In Coltellini's version, four scenes start with an opening aria and end with another: act 1, scene 3, nos. 4 and 5 arias; act 2, scene 6, nos. 16 and 17 arias; act 3, scene 1, nos. 22 and 23 arias; act 3, scene 2, nos. 24 and 25 arias.

Some writers claim that, when the opera was finished, "the performers apparently disliked it" The "failure" of La Finta Semplice in Vienna, which went through rehearsals, but didn't reach full performance, has been the object of similar hazy and cursory descriptions.

Hermann Abert (1871–1927) describes in more precise detail the facts of this "fiasco" in his monumental book "W. A. Mozart" (1919, transl. 2007). This was to be the 5th edition of the famous book of the same title by Otto Jahn (1856–59), the first scholarly biography of Mozart, done with rigorous scientific conscientiousness (Deutsche Gründlichkeit) by a professional archeologist who had become a scholarly expert of ancient Greek vase paintings. Cliff Eisen, who edited the translation of Abert's book in 2007 for Yale University Press with the best scholarship then available, does not dispute Abert's historical facts and reasonings, presented in chapter 5, "First operas in Vienna", p. 82–95, which provided the following quotes.

The first act completed, "Mozart sent it off to the singers, who, according to Leopold, expressed their total satisfaction." Then, Coltellini started making alterations, on the request of Mozart and the singers, and took so long that Easter of 1768, the projected date of the first performance, went by. "Mozart refused to be troubled by this, but continued to work on the opera, eagerly and enthusiastically, writing new arias whenever he was asked to do so", (Abert, p. 86), soon completing a score in three acts, with 26 numbers, covering 558 manuscript pages. Young Mozart thus ended up composing a substantial major opera, lasting (in Leopold Hager's 1983 recording) 2 hours and 45 minutes.

The controversy arose, above all, from the jealousy of other composers, who started circulating the story that the opera had not been written by a 12-year old, but by his father, Leopold. Christoph Willibald Gluck was in town supervising the production of his new opera Alceste, and Leopold wondered whether he was also part of the intrigue against young Mozart. Leopold resorted to a test of improvisation to prove young Mozart's authentic composition skills to elite aristocrats. "He would throw open a random volume from Metastasio's works and invite Wolfgang to provide a musical setting with orchestral accompaniment, of whichever aria he hit upon" (Abert, p. 87).

The impresario, Giuseppe Affligio, an independent contractor, alone in charge of the theater and all opera performances, and bearing all the costs and the risks, made the final decisions about all details of retaining the singers, organizing the rehearsals, and staging the final production. He became influenced by the systematic gossip and started worrying about a negative outcome. He began to have doubts, fearing that the appeal of an opera by a 12-year old prodigy would fade under the suspicions of fraudulent authorship. He found successive reasons to delay the performance.

Things dragged on, until the artists started worrying in turn about the damage to their own reputations if the opera was a flop. The same singers who had "declared themselves well satisfied with music that they described as grateful, now began to fear for the success of the production when they saw how much effort was being expended on preventing it from going ahead. Leopold complained at the singers' duplicity," as the Viennese aristocrats "knew nothing of the inner wickedness of these beasts" (14 September 1768, Abert, p. 87).

Abert gave an extensive musical analysis of the opera, and underlined the high quality of many arias written by Mozart, such as:

- No. 5 Aria: "Guarda la donna in viso" (Fracasso);
- No. 6 Aria: "Colla bocca, e non col core" (Rosina)
- No. 9 Aria: "Senti l'eco, ove t'aggiri" (Rosina)
- No. 13 Aria: "Con certe persone Vuol essere bastone" (Simone
- No. 15 Aria: "Amoretti, che ascosi qui siete" (Rosina) ["The highlight of the opera", with "nobility of utterance" "achieving the expressive intensity of the later Mozart", Abert p. 94]
- No. 16 Aria: Ubriaco non son io" (Cassandro)
- No. 17 Aria: "Sposa cara, sposa bella" (Polidoro)
- No. 19 Duetto: "Cospetton, cospettonaccio!" (Cassandro, Fracasso)
- No. 22 Aria: "Vieni, vieni, oh mia Ninetta" (Simone)
- No. 24 Aria: "Che scompiglio, che flagello" (Giacinta)
- No. 25 Aria: "Nelle guerre d'amore Non val sempre il valore" (Fracasso)

and the 3 ensembles of the finales of each act, where young Mozart displays his remarkable facility in synchronizing the parts of 7 singers:

- No. 11 Finale: "Dove avete la creanza?" (Rosina, Fracasso, etc.)
- No. 21 Finale: "T'ho, detto, buffone" (Cassandro, Polidoro, etc.
- No. 26 Finale: "Se le pupille io giro" (Polidoro, Rosina, etc.).

It is not credible that the singers could have shown displeasure at such charming arias. Here Leopold's account must be trusted against other commenters of the time.

In fact, the turmoil put everybody's reputation at stake, including that of the Salzburg Prince-Archbishop, whose employees the Mozarts were, representing him in Vienna. Leopold wrote that the artists employed and recommended by the archbishop should not be treated as "liars, charlatans, and impostors who venture forth, with his gracious permission, to throw dust in people's eyes like common conjurors" (30 July 1768, Abert, p. 88). Affligio got so worked up that he even threatened, if the work got to first night, to make sure the opening would be a disaster. "He would ensure that it was a fiasco and that it was booed off the stage." Leopold could not take the risk for himself and to thus endanger the unblemished reputation of his son, and "was left with no alternative but to abandon the production." Leopold withdrew from the rehearsals.

In fact, "Affligio was an adventurer and gambler who had obtained his officer's commission by fraud...His complete lack of any understanding of art is clear...He was finally sent to the galleys for forgery." (Abert, p. 88).

The whole affair had "dragged on for 9 months" and in order "to salvage his reputation", Leopold wrote "an indignant petition to the emperor on 21 September 1768, complaining of a conspiracy on the part of the theatre director Giuseppe Affligio, who apparently claimed that Wolfgang's music was ghost-written by his father, and proving Mozart's output by including a list of his compositions to that time." (See also Eisen/Sadie, Grove Online, also Cliff Eisen, Cambridge Mozart Encyclopedia).

Leopold was also requesting the payment of the 100 ducats promised on delivery of the score in the initial Affligio contract plus the reimbursement of his expenses. The petition failed. The letter is reprinted in English translation in Deutsch (1965, pp. 80–83). The Emperor ordered an inquiry, but its result was that the opera was not to be produced.

The Mozarts left Vienna at the end of December 1768, with La finta semplice still unperformed. It was probably produced in their home town of Salzburg, in 1769, at the request of Leopold's employer, Prince-Archbishop Schrattenbach.

== Alienating Empress Maria Theresa ==
This affair's unfortunate outcome may also have further soured and alienated Joseph II's mother, the Empress Maria Theresa. The Empress had 16 children, including 5 sons ("Archdukes"), and she was an important relative of a fair number of monarchs and aristocrats who might have been in a position to give Wolfgang a permanent job.

She was an austere personage who was already offended by the lack of dignity in the Mozarts' European journeys. During the Mozarts' Vienna visit, she may have developed an even more hostile view of the Mozart family.

The failure in 1768 cost young Mozart his chance of establishing his reputation as a first-class opera composer in Vienna, which would have been a jumping board for obtaining a permanent position in another European court.

Later, Mozart was, at first, very successful in Milan with his well-received performances of Mitridate (Carnival of December 1770 to January 1771), and especially Ascanio in Alba, a pastoral serenata performed for the wedding of Archduke Ferdinand (15 October 1771). By contrast, the main opera for the wedding, Ruggiero, by Hasse on a Metastasio libretto, performed the day after the wedding (16 October), generated no enthusiasm. Mozart's serenata, following the main opera was, by contrast, a great success (17 October). Leopold exulted in his letter (19 October): "In a word, it grieves me, but Wolfgang's serenata has so overshadowed Hasse's opera that I cannot describe it." The universal sentiment was confirmed by the Italian and German press.

Maria Theresa had herself commissioned the libretto and composition of the main opera Ruggiero, while Mozart's serenata had been commissioned by the Milan authorities. Hasse had been Maria Theresa's music teacher 38 years earlier, and had remained her favorite musician and personal friend. But he now was 71, suffering from gout, and could barely travel to Milan. The Empress was aware that Hasse was too old and feeble for the event, and that he was past his prime, while young Mozart was only 15, brimming with energy. Still, she was embittered by Hasse's lack of success, and consoled him, back in Vienna, with rich presents. This may have contributed to her growing resentment against the Mozarts.

After the success of Mozart's Lucio Silla (Carnival of December 1772 to January 1773), Leopold, overstayed his visit in Milan by a few months, still hoping for a position for young Mozart, until he was finally advised that no position would be offered. Leopold had to leave empty-handed.

The Empress Maria-Theresa's behind-the-scenes objection to Mozart was revealed much later, when her 17-year-old son Ferdinand, Imperial Governor of Milan, delighted by Mozart's Mitridate, and his wedding serenata, Ascanio in Alba, had expressed his desire to employ young Mozart in his court. His mother answered, in a famous letter of 12 December 1771, advising her son against it:

You ask me to take the young Salzburger into your service. I do not know why, not believing that you have need of a composer or of useless people. If however it would give you pleasure, I have no wish to hinder you. What I say is intended only to prevent your burdening yourself with useless people and giving titles to people of that sort. If they are in your service it degrades that service when these people go about the world like beggars. Besides, he has a large family.

Elsewhere in Italy, Mozart received a very cool reception from another Ferdinand, the King of Naples; Melograni conjectures that he had received the Empress's bad recommendation from his wife, her daughter Maria Carolina.

Historian Derek Beales called Maria-Theresa "monstrously unfair to Mozart." Instead of a court-appointed opera composer, with a stable income and an easy family life, Mozart remained a free-lance opera writer all his life.

The 1768 fiasco in Vienna proved as important, if not more, for Mozart's future as what happened later in Milan in 1773. In both cases he was able to compose brilliant operas, and in both cases he was unable to gain the kind of recognition that would have resulted in a nomination by a court to a permanent position as opera composer. His life, and the world's legacy of Mozart operas, would have been different, if the fates had smiled on him, and the Habsburgs had been more understanding and supportive.

== Roles ==
Role	Voice type	Premiere cast, 1769 (Conductor: – )	Intended cast, 1768 (Vienna)
Fracasso, a Hungarian captain lodging with Cassandro	tenor	Joseph Meissner	Filippo Laschi
Rosina, his sister, a baroness	soprano	Maria Magdalena Lipp	Clementina Baglioni
Cassandro, a tyrannical misogynist	bass	Joseph Hornung	Francesco Carattoli
Polidoro, his timid brother	tenor	Franz Anton Spitzeder	Gioacchino Caribaldi
Giacinta, their sister, evidently no longer young	soprano	Maria Anna Braunhofer	Teresa Eberardi
Simone, Fracasso's orderly, in love with Ninetta	bass	Felix Winter	Domenico Poggi
Ninetta, Giacinta's maid	soprano	Maria Anna Fesemayer	Antonia Bernasconi

== Synopsis ==
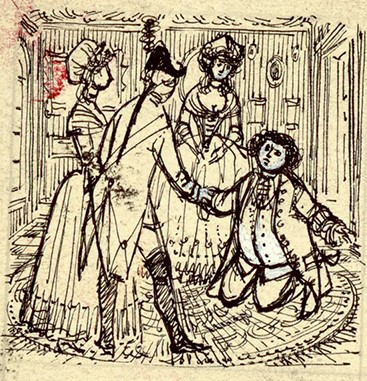
Peter Hoffer's 20th century cover design for the libretto

Place: Cassandro's estate near Cremona
Time: mid-18th century

=== Act 1 ===
Captain Fracasso and his Hungarian troops are stationed near Cremona. He and his sergeant Simone have been lodging for two months in the home of Don Cassandro, who lives in his grand house with his weak-in-the-head brother Polidoro, and their beautiful sister, Giacinta. Inevitably, Captain Fracasso falls in love with Giacinta, and Simone with the chambermaid Ninetta. Fracasso and Giacinta want to marry, as do Simone and Ninetta. But they can't do it without the consent of the brothers Cassandro and Polidoro. The two brothers are comfortable with their status quo – they are confirmed to be misogynists, and unwilling to part with their sister. The wily soubrette Ninetta devises a plan to outwit the brothers, with the collaboration of Rosina, Fracasso's sister, who happens to be "visiting". Rosina (prima donna) poses as a naïve innocent who is going to make both brothers fall in love with her until they agree to the marriages. Polidoro falls in love with Rosina first and proposes marriage immediately. At first Cassandro is indifferent, but eventually his defences are completely disarmed through Rosina's feigned naïvety and innocence. So far, the plan is working.

=== Act 2 ===
Polidoro naively believes Rosina is planning to marry him. Rosina coaches him for a confrontation with his brother Cassandro. Polidoro demands half of his inheritance from Cassandro. Giacinta fears a quarrel between the brothers, but the others look forward to their fight. Rosina and Fracasso congratulate each other for their successful plan to outwit Cassandro. They continue to engineer the rest of the plot. Simone takes Giacinta into hiding. Fracasso tells the brothers that Giacinta has fled, absconding with the family money. The plan is so successful that Ninetta disappears as well. Simone announces that Ninetta has also fled, taking along whatever she could get. The brothers agree that whoever can bring the two girls back should be allowed to marry them, even keeping whatever loot can be found. Fracasso and Simone volunteer to go on the search.

=== Act 3 ===
Simone finds Ninetta and they rejoice that they soon will get married. Fracasso finds Giacinta, but she is afraid that when she returns, her brother will not agree to her marrying Fracasso, but Fracasso assures Giacinta that Rosina has bewitched the brothers and has them under her complete control. Fracasso and Giacinta rejoice at their pairing off. Rosina is confronted with her own choice between both brothers. She rejects Polidoro, who is heartbroken, and agrees to marry Cassandro. They both mercilessly mock Polidoro for his stupidity. All ends well for the three couples, except for the odd man out, Polidoro, who is left alone.

== Numbers and arias ==
There are 26 numbers:

- 1 Coro: No. 1
- 1 Duetto: No. 19, between Cassandro and Fracasso
- 3 Ensembles as "Finales" of each act: No. 11, No. 21, No. 26
- 21 arias, distributed as follows:
  - Cassandro, 3 arias – No. 4, No. 8, No. 16
  - Polidoro, 2 arias – No. 7, No. 17
  - Giacinta, 3 arias – No. 3, No. 14, No. 24
  - Ninetta, 3 arias – No. 10, No. 12, No. 23
  - Fracasso, 3 arias – No. 5, No. 20, No. 25
  - Simone, 3 arias – No. 2, No. 13, No. 22
  - Rosina, 4 arias – No. 6, No. 9, No. 15, No. 18

=== List of numbers and arias of the Goldoni/Coltellini libretto ===
See Leopold Hager's January 1983 complete reference recording

- Act 1:

Sc. 1: No. 1 Coro: "Bella cosa e far l'amore" (Giacinta, Ninetta, Fracasso, Simone)
Sc. 1: No. 2 Aria: "Troppo briga a prender moglie" (Simone sung by Robert Lloyd)
Sc. 2: No. 3 Aria: "Marito io vorrei" (Giacinta sung by Teresa Berganza)
Sc. 3: No. 4 Aria: "Non c'e al mondo altro che donne" (Cassandro sung by Robert Hol)
Sc. 3: No. 5 Aria: "Guarda la donna in viso" (Fracasso sung by Thomas Moser)
Sc. 4: No. 6 Aria: "Colla bocca, e non col core" (Rosina sung by Helen Donath)
Sc. 5: No. 7 Aria: "Cosa ha mai la donna indosso" (Polidoro sung by Anthony Rolfe-Johnson)
Sc. 6: No. 8 Aria: "Ella vuole ed io vorrei" (Cassandro)
Sc. 7: No. 9 Aria: "Senti l'eco, ove t'aggiri" (Rosina)
Sc. 8: No. 10 Aria: "Chi mi vuol bene, presto mel dica" (Ninetta sung by Juitta-Renate Ihloff)
Sc. 9: No. 11 Finale: "Dove avete la creanza?" (all 7, in turn)

Tutti: "Dunque a pranzo in compagnia" (all 7)

- Act 2

Sc. 1: No. 12 Aria: "Un marito, donne care" (Ninetta)
Sc. 2: No. 13 Aria: "Con certe persone Vuol essere bastone" (Simone)
Sc. 3: No. 14 Aria: "Se a martarmi arrivo" (Giacinta)
Sc. 5: No. 15 Aria: "Amoretti, che ascosi qui siete" (Rosina)
Sc. 6: No. 16 Aria: Ubriaco non son io" (Cassandro)
Sc. 6: No. 17 Aria: "Sposa cara, sposa bella" (Polidoro)
Sc. 7: No. 18 Aria: "Ho sentito a dir da tutte" (Rosina)
Sc. 8: No. 19 Duetto: "Cospetton, cospettonaccio!" (Cassandro, Fracasso)
Sc. 11: No. 20 Aria: "In voi, belle, e leggiadria" (Fracasso)
Sc. 13: No. 21 Finale: "T'ho, detto, buffone" (all 6, without Giacinta)

Tutti: "Venga prestissimo, Venga quel giorno" (all 6)

- Act 3

Sc. 1: No. 22 Aria: "Vieni, vieni, oh mia Ninetta" (Simone)
Sc. 1: No. 23 Aria: "Sono in amore" (Ninetta)
Sc. 2: No. 24 Aria: "Che scompiglio, che flagello" (Giacinta)
Sc. 2: No. 25 Aria: "Nelle guerre d'amore Non val sempre il valore" (Fracasso)
Sc. 5: No. 26 Finale: "Se le pupille io giro" (Rosina, Polidoro, Cassandro)
Sc. 6 (scena "ultima") Ensemble: "Nozze, nozze, evviva, evviva" (all 7)

"Tutti": "E inutile adesso di far piu lamenti" (all 7)

== Recordings ==
- 1955 – Dorothea Siebert (Rosina), George Maran (Fracasso), Edith Oravez (Giacinta), Walter Ranninger (Simone), Alois Pernerstorfer (Don Cassandro), August Jaresch (Don Polidoro), Karin Künster (Ninetta) – Camerata Academica des Salzburger Mozarteums, Bernhard Paumgartner – 2 LPs Philips
- 1983 – Helen Donath (Rosina), Thomas Moser (Fracasso), Teresa Berganza (Giacinta), Robert Lloyd (Simone), Robert Holl (Don Cassandro), Anthony Rolfe Johnson (Don Polidoro), Jutta-Renate Ihloff (Ninetta) – Mozarteum Orchestra Salzburg, Leopold Hager – 3 CDs Orfeo
- 1990/91 – Barbara Hendricks (Rosina), Hans Peter Blochwitz (Fracasso), Ann Murray (Giacinta), Andreas Schmidt (Simone), Siegfried Lorenz (Don Cassandro), Douglas Johnson (Don Polidoro), Eva Lind (Ninetta) – C.P.E. Bach Chamber Orchestra, Peter Schreier – 2 CDs Philips Classics
- 2006 – Malin Hartelius (Rosina), Jeremy Ovenden (Fracasso), Marina Comparato (Giacinta), Miljenko Turk (Simone), Josef Wagner (Don Cassandro), Matthias Klink (Don Polidoro), Silvia Moi (Ninetta) – Camerata Academica des Salzburger Mozartuems, Michael Hofstetter – DVD Deutsche Grammophon

== See also ==
- List of operas by Mozart
