= Hans Peter Blochwitz =

German lyric tenor (born 1949)

- Born: 28 September 1949 (age 77); Garmisch-Partenkirchen, Germany
- Education: Technische Hochschule Darmstadt
- Occupation: Classical operatic tenor
- Organizations: University of the Arts Bern

Hans Peter Blochwitz (born 28 September 1949) is a German lyric tenor known internationally for his performance in opera and concert, particularly in Mozart roles.

== Career ==
Born in Garmisch-Partenkirchen on 28 September 1949, Blochwitz first studied computer science at the Technische Hochschule Darmstadt and holds a Ph.D. He studied singing from 1975 in Mainz with Elisabeth Fellner Köberle and in Frankfurt with Erna Westenberger and Karlheinz Jarius.

Blochwitz appeared in 1978 in Frankfurt as a soloist in Bach's Mass in B minor, and in 1984 as the Evangelist in Bach's St Matthew Passion at the Altenberger Dom. He made his operatic debut in September 1984 as Lenski in Tchaikovsky's Eugen Onegin at the Oper Frankfurt; he subsequently performed in Brussels, Geneva, Hamburg, Milan, and Vienna, especially as a Mozart singer. When Peter Schreier, a lyric tenor himself, conducted his first production of Mozart's Don Giovanni in 1987, he cast Blochwitz as Don Ottavio. In September 1990, Blochwitz made his debut at the Metropolitan Opera in the same role. In 1991, he appeared as Belmonte in Mozart's Die Entführung aus dem Serail at the Salzburg Festival.

Blochwitz was also in demand as a singer of oratorio and lieder. He premiered Hans Zender's version of Schuberts "Winterreise", subtitled Eine komponierte Interpretation (A composed interpretation) in 1993, with the Ensemble Modern conducted by the composer. The same musicians made the first recording of the work.

He has been professor at the University of the Arts Bern since 2000.

== Recordings ==
His recorded works include several oratorios such as Bach's St Matthew Passion, Christmas Oratorio and Mass in B minor, Mozart's Requiem in the Süssmayr completion, Haydn's Die Schöpfung, Mendelssohn's Paulus, and Mahler's Das klagende Lied and Das Lied von der Erde. In opera, he recorded Mozart's La finta semplice, Così fan tutte, Don Giovanni, Die Entführung aus dem Serail (video, DVD) and Die Zauberflöte, and Beethoven's Fidelio (as Jacquino). He recorded lieder such as Schubert's Die schöne Müllerin, Robert Schumann's Dichterliebe, and Die schöne Magelone by Brahms.
