= Wladimiro Ganzarolli =

Italian opera singer

Wladimiro Ganzarolli (January 9, 1932 – January 13, 2010) was an Italian operatic bass-baritone, particularly associated with Mozart and Rossini roles.

Born in Venice, he studied in his native city at the Conservatorio di Musica Benedetto Marcello di Venezia with Iris Adami Corradetti. He made his debut at the Teatro Nuovo in Milan, as Mephisto in Faust, in 1958. The following year, he appeared at the Spoleto Festival in Donizetti's Il duca d'Alba, and at the Piccola Scala in Paisiello's Nina.

He made his debut at La Scala in 1961, in the premiere of Pizzetti's Il Calzare d'Argento. During the 1962–63 season, he took part in revivals of Meyerbeer's Les Huguenots, as Nevers, and of Rossini's Semiramide, as Assur, both opposite Joan Sutherland. Other notable roles there included; Dulcamara, Sulpice, Leporello, Figaro, Lescaut, Scarpia, Escamillo, Falstaff, the title roles in Cherubini's Ali Baba and Hindemith's Cardillac. He sang widely in Italy; Verona, Rome, Florence, Venice, Turin, Bologna, Naples, etc.

In 1964, he began a long association with the Vienna State Opera, appearing as Escamillo, Figaro, Colline, Ferrando, Alfio, etc. In 1965, he made his debut at the Royal Opera House in London, and also appeared at the Monte Carlo Opera, the Liceu in Barcelona, the Teatro Nacional Sao Carlos in Lisbon, the Teatro Colón in Buenos Aires, the San Francisco Opera, the Lyric Opera of Chicago, the Dallas Opera, etc.

Although he sang a wide range of roles, Mozart and Rossini were always at the core of his repertory where his comic talent, wide-ranging voice and clear diction were shown to fine effect notably as Figaro, Leporello, Guglielmo, Mustafa, Selim, Dandini. He also enjoyed considerable success as Seneca in Monteverdi's L'incoronazione di Poppea.

== Selected recordings ==
- Haydn – La vera costanza, Antal Dorati – Philips
- Mozart – Le nozze di Figaro, Colin Davis – Philips
- Mozart – Don Giovanni, Colin Davis – Philips
- Mozart – Così fan tutte, Colin Davis – Philips
- Rossini – L'italiana in Algeri, Gabriele Ferro – Sony
- Verdi – Un giorno di regno, Lamberto Gardelli – Philips
- Verdi – Luisa Miller, Lorin Maazel – Deutsche Grammophon
- Verdi – Stiffelio, Lamberto Gardelli – Philips

== Sources ==
- Operissimo.com
