= Claes-Håkan Ahnsjö =

Swedish operatic tenor (born 1942)

Claes-Håkan Ahnsjö (born 1 August 1942) is a Swedish operatic tenor particularly associated with the baroque repertoire and the works of Mozart.

== Life and career ==
Born in Stockholm, Sweden, Ahnsjö first obtained a degree in teaching before turning to musical studies in 1967. He joined the Opera School of the Royal Swedish Opera with private studies with Erik Saedén, Aksel Schiøtz and Max Lorenz. He made his debut at the Royal Swedish Opera in 1969, as Tamino in The Magic Flute, later singing Belmonte, Idamante, Don Ottavio and Ferrando. From 1969, he also became a regular at the summer opera festival at Drottningholm Palace Theatre, which focused on works by Handel, Gluck, Haydn, and Mozart.

In 1973, he joined the Bavarian State Opera in Munich, where he sang a large number of lyric roles including Armand des Grieux in Boulevard Solitude, Almaviva in The Barber of Seville, Nemorino in L'elisir d'amore, Ernesto in Don Pasquale, Duke of Mantua in Rigoletto, Alfredo in La traviata, Fenton in Falstaff, Des Grieux in Manon, Nicias in Thaïs, David in Die Meistersinger von Nürnberg and the title role in Britten's Albert Herring.

During the late 1970s, Ahnsjö featured greatly in the Haydn Eszterháza Opera Cycle on Philips Records, with Antal Doráti conducting the Orchestre de Chambre de Lausanne. He sang in Armida, L'incontro improvviso, L'infedeltà delusa, La vera costanza and Orlando paladino.

In 1991, he played the role of Agenore in a live staging of Mozart's Il re pastore, alongside Sylvia McNair, Jerry Hadley and Iris Vermillion, with Neville Marriner conducting the Academy of St Martin in the Fields. This was digitally remastered later that year to be used as Volume 35 of the Complete Mozart Edition.

Ahnsjö made guest appearances at most of the major opera theatres in Europe and North America as well as in Japan. He also enjoyed a successful career as a concertist, notably in oratorios and lieder.

He was made a Kammersänger in Munich in 1977. He was married to mezzo-soprano Helena Jungwirth (1945–2023).

== Sources ==
- Dictionnaire des interprètes, Alain Pâris, Éditions Robert Laffont, Paris, 1989.
