= Maria Anna Braunhofer =

Austrian opera singer

Maria Anna Braunhofer (15 January 1748 – 20 June 1819) was an operatic soprano, who created several roles in operas by Wolfgang Amadeus Mozart.

She was the daughter of F. J. Braunhofer, organist at Mondsee. She trained as a singer in Venice (1761–64) at the expense of Archbishop Sigismund von Schrattenbach and was employed at the Salzburg court. She created the part of Die göttliche Gerechtigkeit (Divine Justice) in Mozart's Die Schuldigkeit des ersten Gebots and was Giacinta in La finta semplice.
