= Ian Page (conductor) =

British conductor (born 1963)

Ian Page (born 10 December 1963) is a British conductor who is the founder and artistic director of Classical Opera and The Mozartists.

Page studied English literature at the University of York. He then studied piano and conducting at the Royal Academy of Music in London and has worked for Glyndebourne Festival Opera, The Royal Opera, Scottish Opera and English National Opera.

With Classical Opera he has conducted many Mozart operas – including the world premières of the ‘original’ version of Mitridate, re di Ponto and a new completion of Zaide – the UK premières of Gluck’s La clemenza di Tito and Telemann’s Orpheus, and the first new staging for 250 years of Johann Christian Bach’s Adriano in Siria.

In 2012, he embarked on a new complete cycle of Mozart opera recordings. Page also devised MOZART 250, Classical Opera’s twenty-seven year project in which a substantial part of the company's programme each season will explore the music that was being written by Mozart and his contemporaries exactly 250 years previously. The project will run from 2015 to 2041.
