= Thomas Moser =

American-Austrian operatic tenor (born 1945)

Thomas Moser (born 27 May 1945) is an American-Austrian operatic tenor.

== Life ==
Born in Richmond, Virginia, Moser first studied singing at Curtis Institute of Music in Philadelphia and with Martial Singher at the Music Academy of the West, attended master classes with Lotte Lehmann and Gérard Souzay - before moving to Europe in 1975. There he made his debut in Graz, first as lyric tenor and Mozart interpreter. Only two years later, Moser sang for the first time at the Vienna State Opera, as Iopas in Berlioz' opera Les Troyens).

In the 1990s, Moser increasingly turned to heldentenor roles and first appeared as Lohengrin, then also as Parsifal and finally also as Tristan. In this role he celebrated an outstanding success at the side of Deborah Voigt in Vienna in spring 2003 in the new production directed by Christian Thielemann and Günter Krämer.

Moser has been an Austrian citizen since 1992.
