= Werner Hollweg =

German operatic tenor

Werner Hollweg (13 September 1936 in Solingen - 1 January 2007 in Freiburg im Breisgau) was a German operatic tenor. He is best known for his interpretation of Mozart's operas. Hollweg died from amyotrophic lateral sclerosis.
