= Serail =

Serail may refer to:

- Saray (building), an administrative building (from Turkish saray, meaning palace)
- Saray (harem), a building or buildings for a harem (also from Turkish saray, meaning palace)
- Grand Serail of Aleppo
- Grand Serail in Beirut
- Die Entführung aus dem Serail, 1782 singspiel by Wolfgang Amadeus Mozart
- Sérail, 1976 French movie
