= Adamberger =

Adamberger is a surname. Notable people with the surname include:

- Antonie Adamberger (1790–1867), Austrian stage actress
- Maria Anna Adamberger (1752–1804), Austrian actress
- Valentin Adamberger (1740–1804), German operatic singer
