= Der Schauspieldirektor =

1786 opera by Wolfgang Amadeus Mozart

- Singspiel by W. A. Mozart
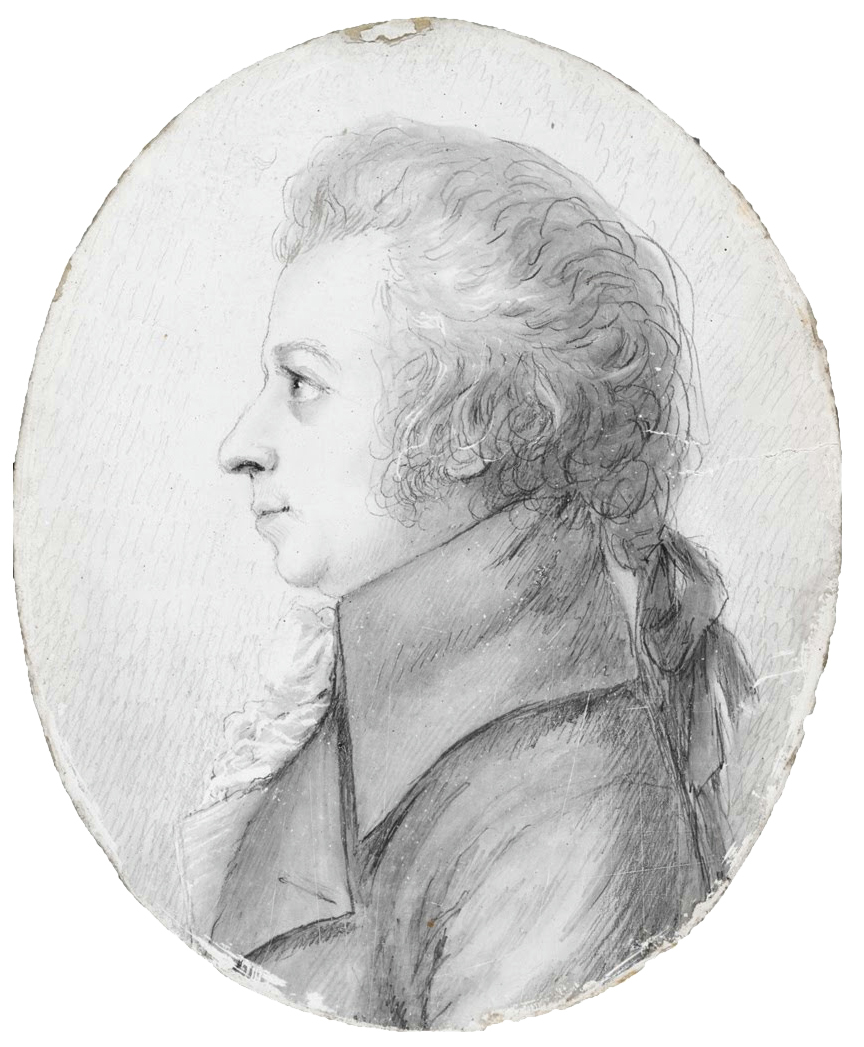
- The composer, drawing by Dora Stock, 1789
- Translation: The Impresario
- Librettist: Gottlieb Stephanie
- Language: German
- Premiere: 7 February 1786; Schönbrunn Palace Orangery, Vienna

Der Schauspieldirektor (The Impresario), K. 486, is a comic singspiel by Wolfgang Amadeus Mozart, set to a German libretto by Gottlieb Stephanie, an Austrian Schauspieldirektor. Originally, it was written because of "the imperial command" of the Holy Roman Emperor Joseph II who had invited 80 guests to a private luncheon. It is regarded as "a parody on the vanity of singers", who argue over status and pay.

Mozart, who describes it as "comedy with music" wrote it as his entry in a musical competition which was given a private performance hosted on 7 February 1786 by Joseph II at the Schönbrunn Palace in Vienna. This competition pitted a German singspiel, presented at one end of the room, against a competing Italian opera, the Italian entry being Antonio Salieri's opera buffa, Prima la musica e poi le parole (First the Music, then the Words), which was then given at the other end of the room. The premiere was followed by the first of three public performances given four days later at the Kärntnertor Theater, Vienna, on 11 February.

The autograph manuscript of the opera is preserved in the Morgan Library & Museum.

== Composition history ==
The work was written during a very creative period in Mozart's life, at the same time as his Le nozze di Figaro, which premiered later the same year, along with three piano concertos and "another dozen major works".

In addition to the overture, there are only four vocal numbers in the score, and the musical content (about 30 minutes) is surrounded by much spoken dialogue, typical in its day. One highlight, which Erik Smith describes as very funny, is where "each lady sings about the nobility of her art while trying to defeat her rival with ever higher notes". Although it has been described as a "silly farce", Mozart appears to have taken the opportunity to write serious arias and thus the "audition" of Madame Herz includes her aria "Da schlägt die Abschiedsstunde" ("There tolls the hour of departure"), while Mme Silberklang sings the elegant rondo, "Bester Jüngling" ("Dearest Youth").

== Performance history ==
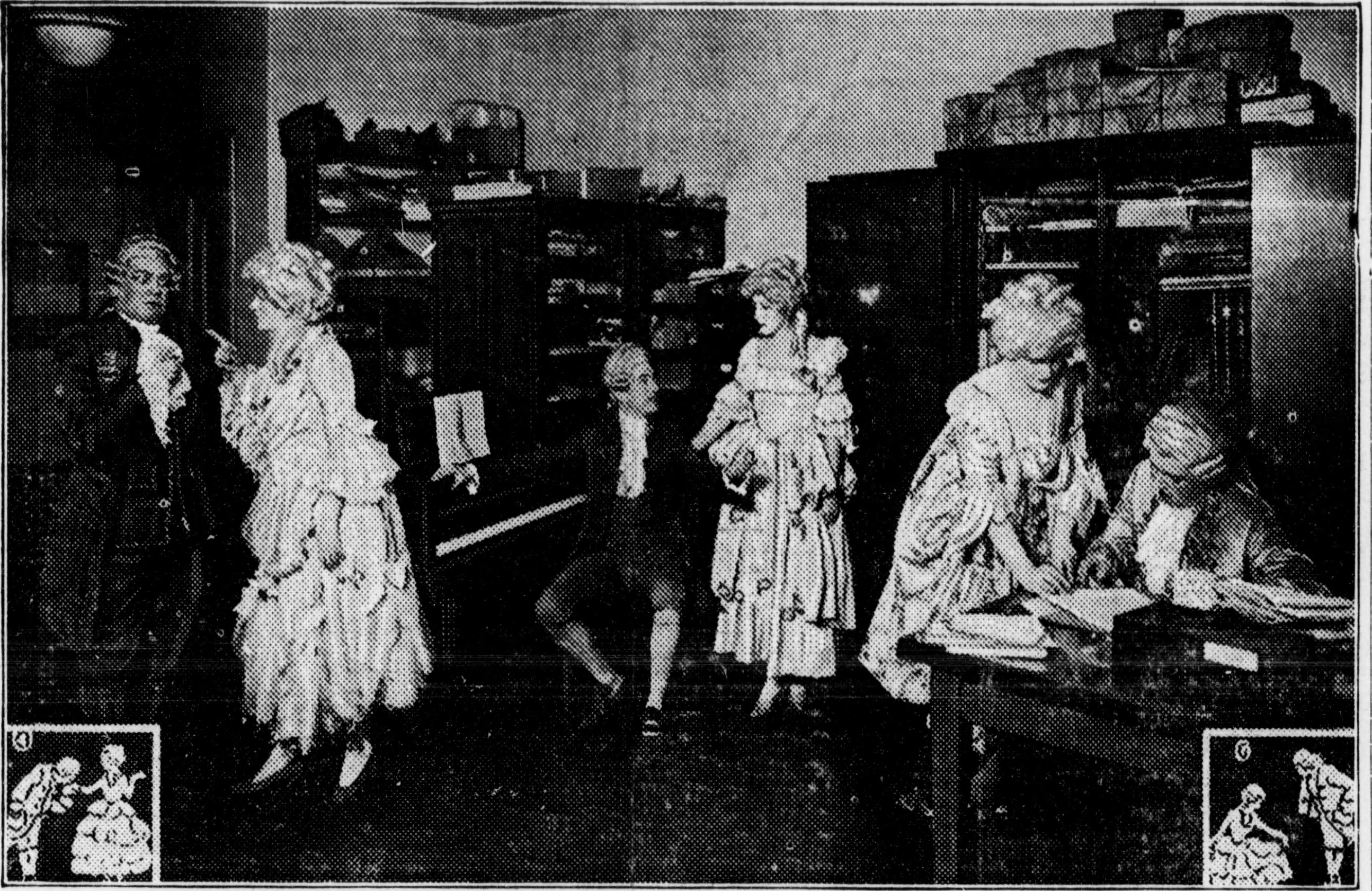
Henry Edward Krehbiel's translation of The Impresario toured the United States in 1921.

The opera was first presented in the United Kingdom on 30 May 1857 at the St James's Theatre in London and given its US premiere at the Stadt Theatre in New York on 9 November 1870.

In modern times, the text is usually completely rewritten for contemporary relevance, which was the case for the 2014 production given by the Santa Fe Opera. There it had "English dialogue by the British dramatist Ranjit Bolt and additional Mozart concert arias folded into the score" with the action taking place in Paris in the 1920s. The cast included Anthony Michaels-Moore, Brenda Rae, Meredith Arwady, and Erin Morley.

The 1966 recording by the English Chamber Orchestra (conducted by André Previn), was performed with an English libretto penned by Previn's then wife Dory Previn, who transplanted the amusing tale to the 20th century.

Bronx Opera performed it in 1972, 2008, and in 2021, due to the COVID-19 pandemic, as a video version in Zoom format.

== Roles ==
Roles, voice types, premiere cast
Role	Voice type	Premiere cast, 7 February 1786
Frank, an impresario	spoken role	Johann Gottlieb Stephanie Jr.
Eiler, a banker	spoken role	Johann Franz Brockmann
Buff, a buffo singer	bass	Giuseppe Weidmann
Monsieur Vogelsang, a singer	tenor	Valentin Adamberger
Madame Herz, a singer	soprano	Aloysia Weber
Mademoiselle Silberklang, a singer	soprano	Caterina Cavalieri
Herz, an actor	spoken role	Joseph Lange
Madame Pfeil, an actress	spoken role	Anna Maria Stephanie
Madame Krone, an actress	spoken role	Johanna Sacco
Madame Vogelsang, an actress	spoken role	Maria Anna Adamberger

== Synopsis ==
Place: Vienna
Time: 1786

Frank, the impresario (along with the buffo singer, Buff, who assists him) auditions two actresses to be part of his new theatrical company. While both are hired, they then argue over who will get the prime role and who will be paid the most. To illustrate their strengths, each sings a striking aria to back her claim (Herz: "Da schlägt die Abschiedsstunde", Silberklang: "Bester Jüngling"). An agreement is reached when the tenor, Vogelsang, intervenes, in what Julian Rushton describes as a hilarious trio, "Ich bin die erste Sängerin" (I am the prima donna) compromise is agreed to with each receiving "large salaries and star billing". The work ended with the quartet "Jeder Künstler strebt nach Ehre" (Every artist strives for glory).

== Recordings ==
Year	Cast: Madame Herz, Mlle Silberklang, Vogelsang, Buff	Conductor, Opera house and orchestra	Label
1966	Judith Raskin, Reri Grist, Richard Lewis, Sherrill Milnes	André Previn, English Chamber Orchestra; Leo McKern as Impresario	CD: Sony; Cat: 88985470422; Sleeve notes by George R. Marek
1968	Sylvia Geszty, Rosemarie Rönisch, Peter Schreier, Hermann Christian Polster	Helmut Koch, Kammerorchester Berlin	CD: Berlin Classics; Cat: 9136. Complete recording of 10 scenes including those spoken. Also used in Brilliant Classics' Mozart – Complete Works.
1974	Reri Grist, Arleen Auger, Peter Schreier, Kurt Moll	Karl Böhm, Staatskapelle Dresden	CD: Deutsche Grammophon; Cat: DG 429 877-2 (+ Die Zauberflöte)
1975	Ruth Welting, Ileana Cotrubaș, Anthony Rolfe Johnson, Clifford Grant	Sir Colin Davis, London Symphony Orchestra	CD: Philips; Cat: 422 536-2 (+ Zaide). Also used in Philips' Complete Mozart Edition
1986	Magda Nádor, Krisztina Laki, Thomas Hampson, Harry van der Kamp	Nikolaus Harnoncourt, Royal Concertgebouw Orchestra	CD: Teldec; Cat: 8 43336 (+ Salieri's Prima la musica, poi la parole)
1990	Edita Gruberová, Kiri Te Kanawa, Uwe Heilmann, Manfred Jungwirth	John Pritchard, Vienna Philharmonic	CD: Decca, Cat: 475 7049 (+ concert arias)
	Eva Mei, Patricia Petibon, Markus Schäfer, Oliver Widmer	Nikolaus Harnoncourt, Concentus Musicus Wien	CD: belvedere Cat: 08035 (+ Salieri's Prima la musica, poi la parole)
2001	Cyndia Sieden, Sharon Baker, John Aler, Kevin Deas	Martin Pearlman, Boston Baroque	CD: Telarc; Cat: 80573 (+ Der wohltätige Derwisch by Benedikt Schack)
