= Friedrich Hieronymus Truhn =

German conductor, composer and writer on music

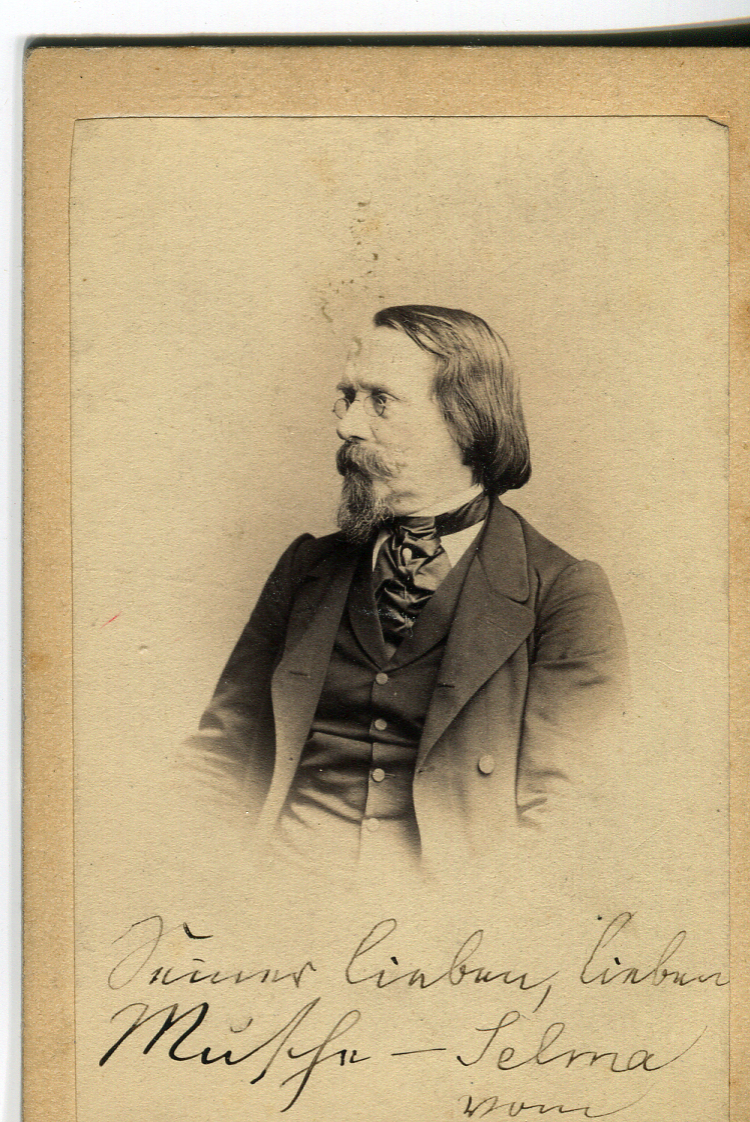
Friedrich Hieronymus Truhn

Friedrich Hieronymus Truhn (14 November 1811 – 30 April 1886) was a German conductor, composer and writer on music who worked mainly in Berlin, Danzig, Elbing and Riga. He was the son of court marshall Nathanael Truhn and the grandfather of Selma Erdmann-Jesnitzer, born Bethge-Truhn, father of Clara and Anna Marie Elizabeth Truhn. He was a talented composer of numerous songs, several stage works, and also a key organizer in the field of men's choirs.

== Life ==
Friedrch was born in Elbing. As a boy he attracted attention by his singing abilities, so as soon he was developing himself as a flute player, and shortly thereafter as a violinist, he was sent to the orchestra of his native town, although his parents did not admitted that he had chosen the music as a career. Only in 1831 they allowed him to go to Berlin as a student of theorist Siegfried Wilhelm Dehn, of Carl Friedrich Zelter and Bernhard Klein. He briefly studied orchestration with Mendelssohn to be properly trained as musician. He worked at the city theater in Gdansk as conductor and music teacher in the years 1835-37 and back in Berlin, he became one of the chief contributors to Schumann's paper, the Neue Zeitschrift für Musik, Hamburger Correspondenten and the feature pages of the Neue Berliner Musikzeitung.

In 1840, Friedrich lived in Königsberg, Prussia, and there held great performances of his own and others musicians' compositions. In 1843 he accompanied the pianist Theodor Döhler on an art trip to Sweden, where he acted as composer and conductor. In 1848 he returned to his birthplace, founded a choral society and organized many public performances. There he worked until 1852 as a music teacher and conductor. In the meantime he again worked as a freelancer in Berlin, founded the Berliner Liedertafel, a choral society on the conceptual model of King Arthur and the Knights of the Round Table. In 1854 he traveled with Mr. von Bülow, and then he settled in Riga, where he worked as vocal and music theory teacher until 1858. After that he settled permanently in Berlin.

His printed compositions, summoning up to well over 100 opus, were almost consistently received in critical acclaim, but in no way they became universally popular pieces. They were played, sung and then set aside. Truhn was welcome in all social circles, both as a guest and also as a music teacher. His death put an end not only to his life, but also to the viability of his compositions as the newspapers of the time published obituaries often appreciative of his person and talent as a classical composer.

He died in Berlin.

== Works ==
=== Songs and chants for male chorus ===
- The Fisherman, Op. 1 (1832)
- The Beautiful Waitress from Bacharach, Op. 13 (1836)
- Seraphina, Op. 19 (after Heine, Laube, Eichendorff)
- Lieder, Op. 21 (after Goethe)
- The Beetle Boys, for 4 male voices with accompaniment, Op. 30 (1839)
- A Love Story in 12 Songs, Op. 64
- The Boy's Death (Uhland, Op. 82
- The Father's Tomb, Op. 105 (1853)
- L'Abbandonata

=== Choral works ===
- Mahadöh, for solo voices, eight-voice choir and orchestra (1846)
- The Departure (after Uhland) for solo voices, choir and orchestra (1850)

=== Stage works ===
- The Four-Year Income (after Theodor Körner), Singspiel in one act (1833)
- Trilby (after Ludwig Schneider), a comic opera in 2 acts (1835)
- Cleopatra, melodrama (for Johanna Wagner, 1853)

=== Writings ===
- About the Art of Singing and the Teaching of Art Song (1872)
- The Old Prima Donna, And, Sounding (1844)

== See also ==
- Classical music
- Romantic music
