= Louis Schneider (actor) =

German actor and author (1805–1878)

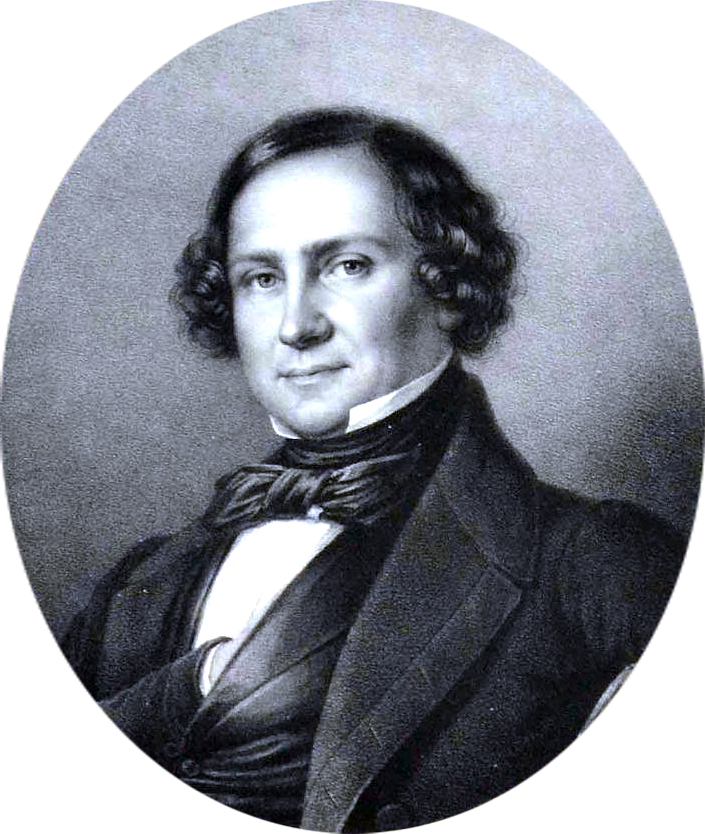
- Born: 29 April 1805; Berlin, Kingdom of Prussia
- Died: 16 December 1878 (aged 73); Potsdam, German Empire

Louis Schneider (born Ludwig Wilhelm Schneider: 29 April 1805 – 16 December 1878) was a German actor and author.

== Biography ==
Schneider was born in Berlin, the son of George Abraham Schneider (1770–1839). At an early age he was engaged at the Royal Theatre, Berlin, where he soon rose to play leading comedy parts. His reputation as a comedian grew with his success in such roles as Zierl in the Einfahrt vom Lande, Peter in the Kapellmeister von Venedig, Schikaneder in his own revision of Mozart's Der Schauspieldirektor and Basilio in Le Nozze di Figaro, and he became the favourite of Berlin.

In 1845 he was appointed head of the Royal opera in Berlin. The same year he adapted Mozart's singspiel Der Schauspieldirektor, replacing Gottlieb Stephanie's libretto with his own which included the characters of Mozart, Emanuel Schikaneder, Mozart's sister-in-law Aloysia Lange among others. Schneider's version was first performed in Berlin on 25 April 1845. Ludwig's bold patriotic couplets and impromptus during the revolutionary year 1848 necessitated his retirement, and thereafter he translated and adapted for the stage Mozart's Cosi fan tutte; published, under the pseudonym "L. W. Both," Das Buhnenrepertoire des Auslandes; and founded, as a result of his experiences as a soldier in the Danish war of 1849, the periodical Der Soldatenfreund.

He also wrote Geschichte der Oper und des Opernhauses in Berlin (1845–1852). Soon after his retirement he was appointed reader to Frederick William IV of Prussia, and subsequently he received the title of Geheimen Hofrat. He continued to enjoy the favour of the court, and, as correspondent of the Staatsanzeiger, was attached to the headquarters staff of the Prussian army during the campaign of 1866; and, by special invitation, accompanied the emperor William during the war of 1870. Schneider also wrote a novel, Das böse Glück, and several volumes of reminiscences: König Wilhelm (1869), Kaiser Wilhelm, 1867–1871 (1875). He died at Potsdam.

For more information see his posthumous memoirs, Aus meinem Leben (Berlin, 1879–1880), and Aus dem Leben Kaiser Wilhelms (1888), which caused some sensation on their publication.
