= Gottlieb Stephanie =

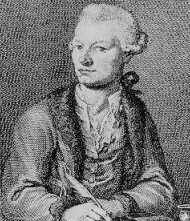
Engraved portrait of Gottlieb Stephanie

Johann Gottlieb Stephanie the Younger (19 February 1741 – 23 January 1800) was an Austrian playwright, director and librettist, most famously to Mozart.

Stephanie was born in Breslau, Prussia. He was taken prisoner by the Austrian forces in the Battle of Landeshut (1760) in the Seven Years' War. After nine months of imprisonment in Villach, he joined the Imperial Army and went to Vienna after the war ended. He was appointed to head the National Singspiel, a favourite project of Emperor Joseph II.

Stephanie's adaptation of Christoph Friedrich Bretzner's Belmont und Constanze has been harshly criticized; E. J. Dent called it "the very worst that he ever set to music". Mozart wrote to his father, "you are quite right so far as Stephanie's work is concerned. ... I am well aware that the verse is not of the best."

In 1769 Stephanie adapted Shakespeare's Macbeth to suit popular taste in Vienna. It was performed in the 1770s.

== Personal life ==
Stephanie's original surname was Stephan. He and his older brother, Christian Gottlob Stephanie (1733 – 10 April 1798) changed it to Stephanie. Gottlieb Stephanie the Younger married Anna Maria Mika (1751, Stiahlau, Bohemia – 2 February 1802, Vienna), an actress who debuted on 27 April 1771 at the Burgtheater. The couple had a daughter, Wilhelmine, also an actress. Gottlieb Stephanie died in Vienna, aged 58.

== Works ==
- Die Entführung aus dem Serail, 1782, Music: Wolfgang Amadeus Mozart
- Der Schauspieldirektor, 1786, Music: Wolfgang Amadeus Mozart
- Doktor und Apotheker, 1786, Music: Carl Ditters von Dittersdorf
