= Ernst Brandes =

Ernst Brandes may refer to:

- Ernst Brandes (journalist) (1758–1810), Hanoverian lawyer, official, writer, and scholar
- Ernst Brandes (politician) (1862–1935), German lawyer, estate manager and politician
- Ernst Immanuel Cohen Brandes (1844–1892), Danish economist, writer, and newspaper editor
