= O, wie will ich triumphieren =

Bass aria from Mozart's Singspiel 'Die Entführung aus dem Serail'

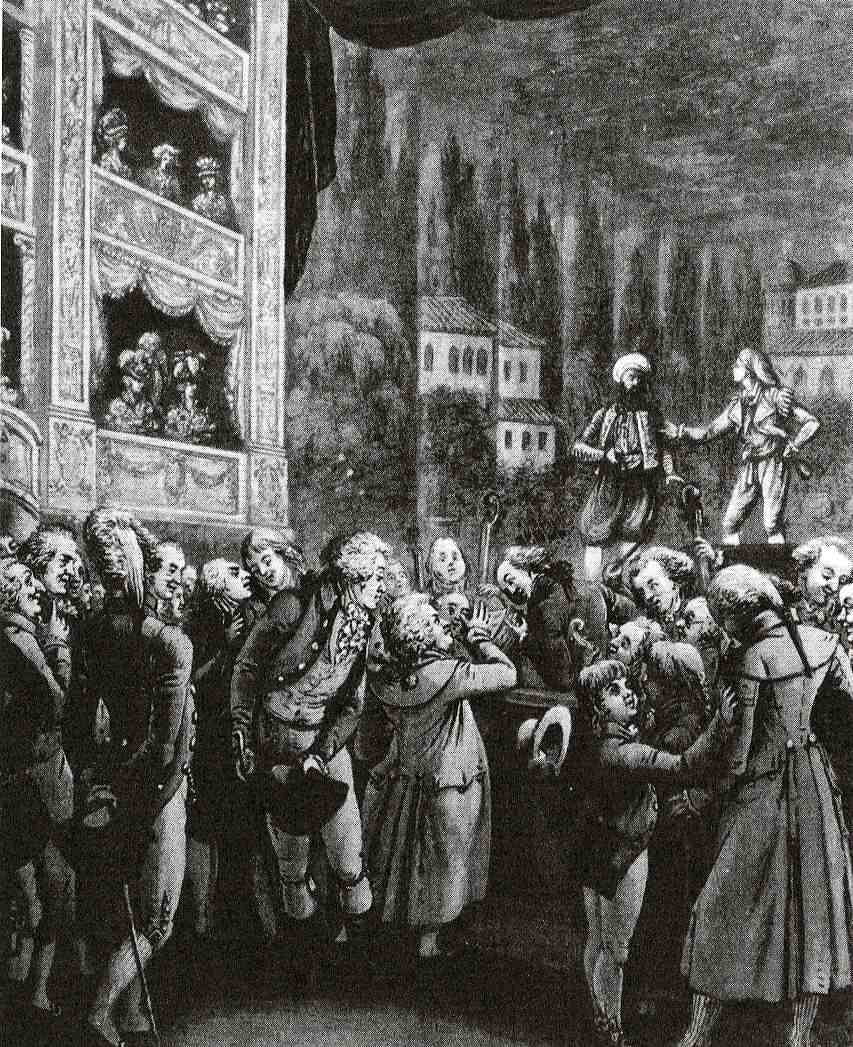
Wolfgang Amadeus Mozart (center) attending a performance of Die Entführung aus dem Serail in 1789

"O, wie will ich triumphieren" (or, "Ha, wie will ich triumphieren"), is an aria for low bass from act 3 of Wolfgang Amadeus Mozart's Singspiel Die Entführung aus dem Serail (The Abduction from the Seraglio).

It is well known for the extraordinary technical demands it makes on the singer, and is sometimes performed in recitals and featured in anthologies. It features coloratura, abrupt octave-leaps between the upper and lower registers, and extended low notes, including a drawn-out low D_{2}, one of the lowest notes demanded of any voice in opera. Mozart wrote it with one particular bass in mind: the very famous Ludwig Fischer.

== Context ==
Osmin, the bad-tempered house-servant to Pasha Selim, has caught his hated enemies trying to rescue a noblewoman from captivity in the Pasha's harem. He taunts them, gleefully anticipating the pleasure of seeing them hanged.
