= Maria Anna Adamberger =

Austrian actress

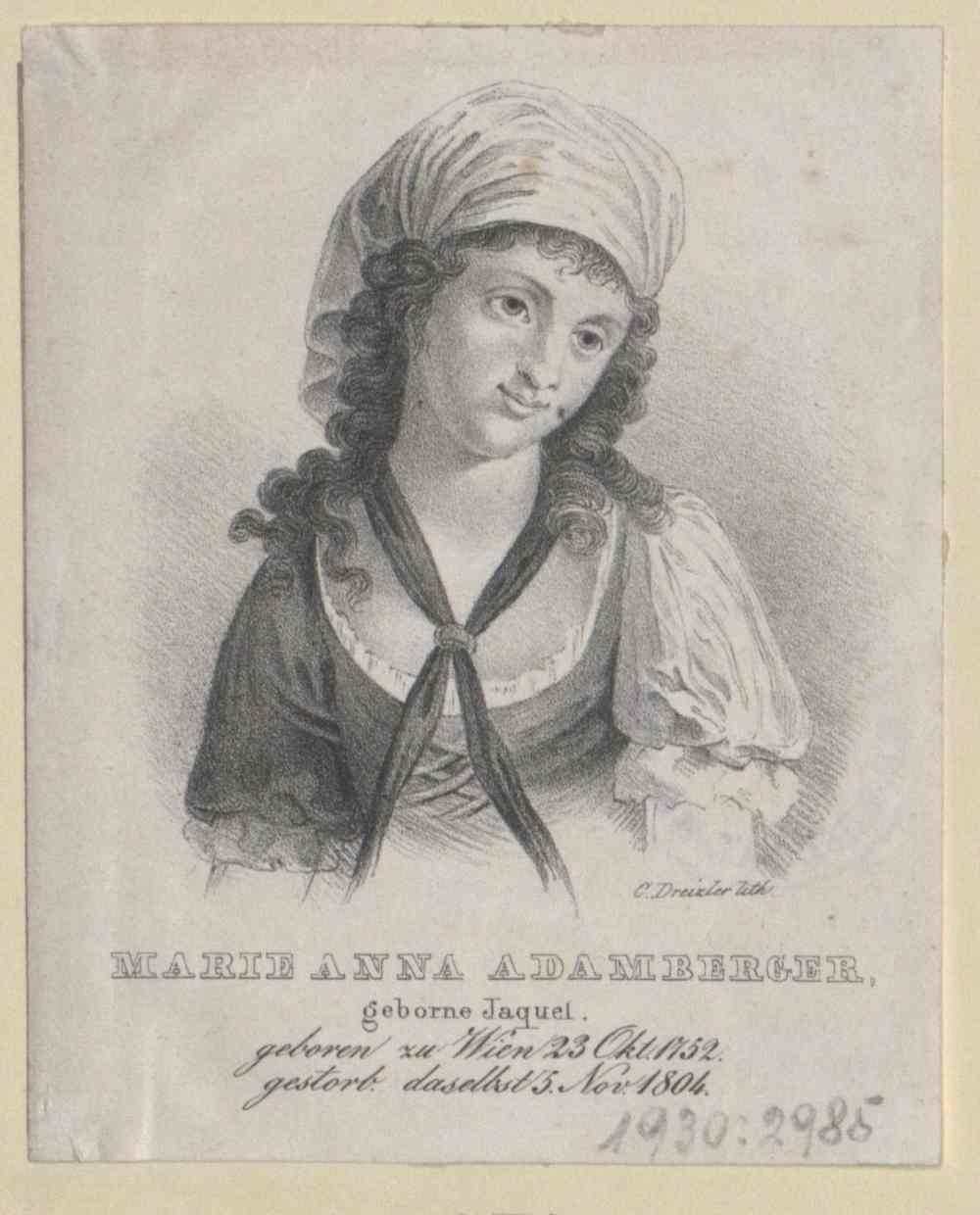
- Posthumous portrait in the Burgtheater-Galerie as Rofine from Der Jurist und der Bauer
- Born: Maria Anna/Anna Marie Jaquet; 23 October 1752; Vienna, Archduchy of Austria, Holy Roman Empire
- Died: 5 November 1807 (aged 55); Vienna, Austrian Empire
- Other names: Nanny Adamberger
- Occupation: Actress
- Years active: 1760–1798
- Employer: Burgtheater
- Notable work: Madame Volgesang in Der Schauspieldirektor
- Spouse: Valentin Adamberger (m. 1781; died 1804)
- Children: Antonie Adamberger
- Father: Karl J. Jaquet
- Relatives: Katharina Jaquet (sister)

Maria Anna/Anna Marie "Nanny" Adamberger (23 October 1752 – 5 November 1807), born Jaquet, was an Austrian actress. She played ingénue roles in comedies and originated the role of Madame Vogelsang in Der Schauspieldirektor ("The Impresario") by Mozart.

== Career ==
Adamberger received her training from her father, actor Karl J. Jacquet (1726–1813). She started playing in the Theater nächst der Burg ("Theatre Next to the Castle") in 1760, at the age of 8, and became a member of the company in 1768, aged 16. After playing some tragic roles and not being satisfied with the success she achieved in them, she decided to perform only in comedies.

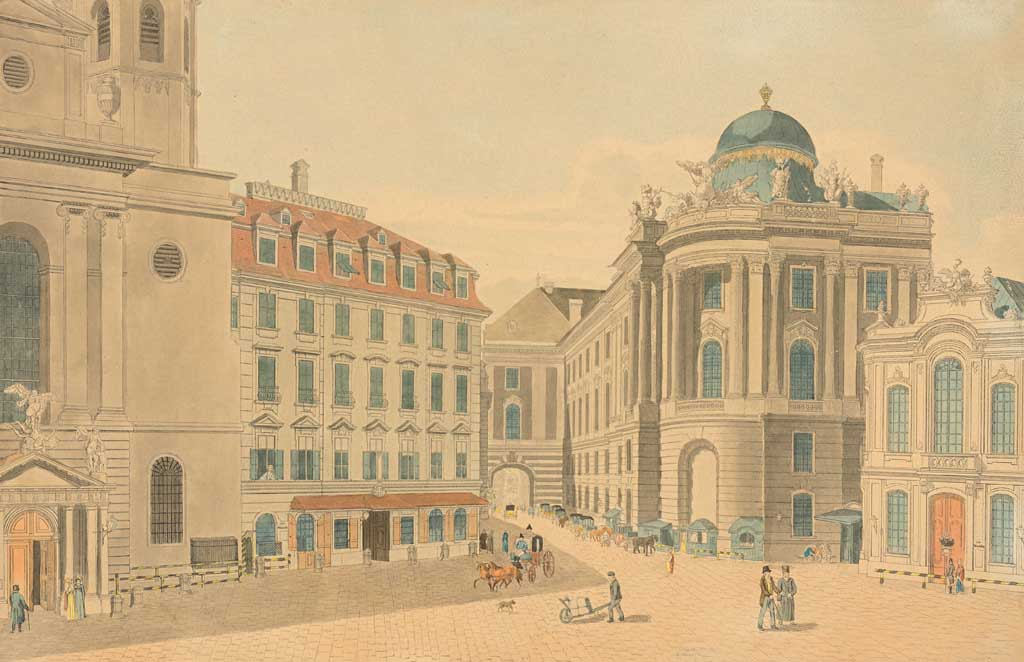
The old Burgtheater on Michaelerplatz next to the Hofburg, by Carl Schütz.

She became known as an excellent ingénue playing the roles of naïve or lively and whimsical young women in comedies and achieved considerable success and fame. In 1786, she originated the spoken role of Madame Vogelsang in Woflgang Amadeus Mozart's Singspiel Der Schauspieldirektor ("The Impresario"), playing opposite of her husband as Monsieur Vogelsang. She retired in 1798, aged 46, her last role being that of Gurli in Indianer in England ("Indians in England").

Adamberger remained a favourite of audiences throughout her whole career, and contemporary Viennese poets such as Heinrich Joseph von Collin wrote many poems praising her. She was one of the first actors whose picture was included in the Ehrengalerie ("Gallery of Honour") of the company, depicting her in her role as Rofine in Der Jurist und der Bauer ("The Lawyer and the Peasant"). Ernst Brandes wrote about her that "it would not be possible" to play a mischievous peasant woman or a naughty city girl in a "truer and more endearing" way. He described her as charming with a "gracefully built" body and a pleasant face, her facial expressions as admirable. She also had a technique for delivering confessions that her character did not want to make: she bit down on the words in a very natural way.

According to Mener, she belonged "only in Lustspiels", a specifically German and bourgeois type of comedy as opposed to the French courtly comedies of Molière and the coarser genres of Posse mit Gesang ("farce with singing") and Schwank. He also asserted that whoever saw her play in Lustspiels "forgot that there could be anything outside of the comedy" and that she could "entertain the mind, move the heart and delight the soul". He agreed that she was "unique, peculiar, inimitable and charming".

== Personal life ==
Her husband and daughter

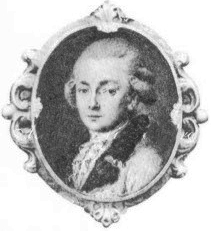
Valentin Adamberger around 1785

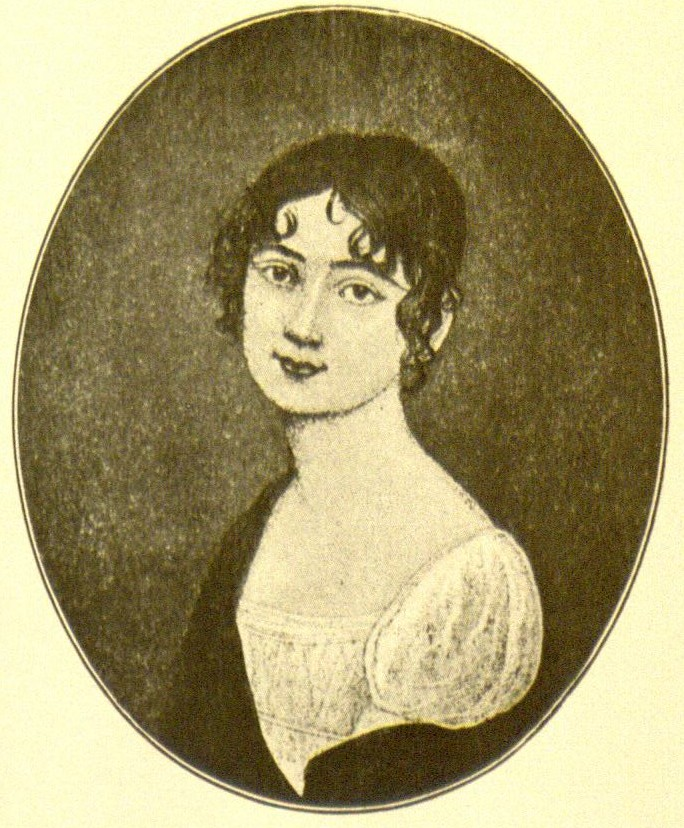
Antonie Adamberger

Adamberger was born on 23 October 1752 in Vienna, Archduchy of Austria, the daughter of court actor Karl J. Jaquet (1726–1813). She had a younger sister, Katharina (1760–1786). from an early age, her father wanted her to become an actress, and trained her himself. She married operatic tenor (Josef) Valentin Adamberger "Valentino Adamonti" (1743–1804) in 1781 and had one daughter with him, actress Antonie "Toni" von Arnet (born Adamberger) (1790–1867), born 31 December 1790. Maria was widowed in 1804 and died on 5 November 1807 in Vienna, aged 55.
