= Henriette Dauer-von Etzdorf =

German opera singer (1758–1843)

Henriette Dauer-von Etzdorf (1758 – 16 March 1843 in Vienna) was a German stage actress and opera singer.

Born in Gotha, Dauer, née von Etzdorf, made her stage debut in 1778. She worked at the Hofburgtheater from 1779 to 1822, mostly as an actress, but also as an opera singer according to the customs of that time. She often played stereotypical comic roles at the Burgtheater.

She was married to her colleague Johann Ernst Dauer (1746–1812).
