= Johann Ernst Dauer =

German stage actor and operatic tenor

Johann Ernst Dauer (1746 – 27 September 1812) was a German stage actor and operatic tenor.

== Life ==
Dauer was born in Hildburghausen. From 1779 to 1812, he worked at the Hofburgtheater – mostly as an actor, but according to the customs of the time also as an opera singer, especially in the opera buffa field. On 16 July 1782 he played the character of Pedrillo at the premiere of Mozart's opera Die Entführung aus dem Serail.

He was married to his colleague Henriette Dauer-von Etzdorf (1758–1843), from whom he was divorced again in 1795.

Dauer died in Vienna aged approximately 66.

== Sources ==
- Karl-Josef Kutsch, Leo Riemens: Großes Sängerlexikon. 4th, extended and updated edition, Munich: K. G. Saur, 2003, vol. 2, p. 1020, ISBN 3-598-11598-9
- Michael Lorenz, "Das Forschungsprojekt "W. A. Mozart und sein Wiener Umfeld": Mozartforschung in Wien am Beginn des 21. Jahrhunderts", Vienna 2013
