= The Abduction from the Seraglio (film) =

1961 film

- Based on: Die Entführung aus dem Serail by Wolfgang Amadeus Mozart
- Directed by: Alan Burke
- Country of origin: Australia
- Original language: English

Production
- Running time: 90 minutes

Original release
- Release: 22 February 1961

The Abduction from the Seraglio is an Australian TV version of Wolfgang Amadeus Mozart's opera Die Entführung aus dem Serail and sung in English. It aired on 22 February, 1961, and again on 12 April, 1961, in Melbourne. It was one of a number of operas broadcast by the ABC in the early days of Australian television.

== Cast ==
- Rae Cocking as Constanze
- Rosalind Keene as Blonde
- Alan Light as Pasha Selim
- Donald Smith as Belmonte
- Neil Warren-Smith as Osmin
- Gino Zancanaro as Pedrillo

== Reception ==
The critic for The Sydney Morning Herald thought "it would be hard to pick a more unsuitable opera for television" than The Abduction from the Seraglio due to the length of the arias and lack of movement. But he felt the production was "handsome and remarkable" which proved that "no opera can be presumed unfit for television, provided the delight in visual ingenuities is matched by a genuine appreciation of its purely musical opportunities."
