= Valentin Adamberger =

German operatic tenor

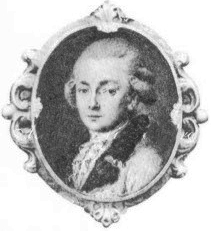
- Born: Valentin Adamberger; 22 February 1740/6 July 1743; Rohr, Bavaria/Munich, Bayern
- Died: 24 August 1804; Vienna, Austria
- Other name: Valentino Adamonti
- Education: Domus Gregoriana
- Occupation: Operatic tenor
- Employers: London King's Theatre; Vienna National Court Theater

Valentin Adamberger, also known by his Italian name Adamonti, (22 February 1740 or 6 July 1743 – 24 August 1804) was a German operatic tenor. His voice was universally admired for its pliancy, agility, and precision, and several composers of note, such as Mozart, wrote music specifically for him.

== Biography ==
Adamberger was born either in Rohr, Bavaria in 1740 or in Munich in 1743. Beginning in 1755, he studied singing with Johann Walleshauser (also known as Giovanni Valesi) while at the Domus Gregoriana, a Jesuit institution in Munich. In 1760, he joined the Kapelle of Duke Clemens and upon the Duke's death in 1770 was taken into the Elector's Hofkapelle. He made his opera début at Munich in 1772. This was the beginning of a successful career singing leading tenor roles in opera seria at Modena, Venice, Florence, Pisa and Rome. He created roles in operas by Josef Mysliveček, J. C. Bach, Giuseppe Sarti, Pietro Guglielmi, Antonio Sacchini, Ferdinando Bertoni and others. The arias they wrote for his voice tended to be moderate in tempo and often were written in B major. Many of the composers orchestrated his arias with obbligato clarinets and expressive chromatic inflections.

In Rome, Adamberger sang under the italianized stage name Valentino Adamonti from 1775 to 1777. From 1778-1779 he sang at the King's Theatre in London. After returning to Italy briefly for appearances in Florence and Milan, he joined the Singspiel company of the National Court Theater at Vienna. He made his début there on 21 August 1780. The following year, he married the Viennese actress Maria Anna Adamberger (1753–1804); their daughter was Antonie Adamberger, later a popular actress. In 1783, the Singspiel company disbanded but Adamberger was kept on for the Italian company that replaced it. When the Singspiel company was revived in 1785, alongside the Italian, he again became its leading tenor, and when it was disbanded for the second time, in 1789, he returned to the Italian company. In 1793, he retired from the stage but continued as a member of the imperial Hofkapelle and as an eminent singing teacher. He died in Vienna.

Although Adamberger's voice was admired where ever he went, he did have his critics. Christian Schubart and Mount Edgcumbe remarked on the nasal quality of his voice in the higher vocal register and Charles Burney, generally a harsh critic of singers, remarked that "with a better voice [he] would have been a good singer". However, he was universally liked by the public in Italy, Germany, and England, and was a particularly popular singer in Vienna. Michtner, a local Viennese journalist, wrote of Adamberger that he was "the favourite singer of softer hearts". Mozart, who admired Adamberger, wrote the part of Belmonte in Die Entführung aus dem Serail (1782) for him. In a letter dated 26 September 1781, Mozart wrote, "Let me now turn to Belmonte's aria in A major, ‘O wie ängstlich, o wie feurig’. Would you like to know how I have expressed it – and even indicated his throbbing heart? By the two violins playing in octaves. This is the favourite aria of all who have heard it, and it is mine also. I wrote it expressly to suit Adamberger's voice. You see the trembling, the faltering, you see how his throbbing breast begins to swell; this I have expressed by a crescendo. You hear the whispering and the sighing – which I have indicated by the first violins with mutes and a flute playing in unison." Mozart also composed the role of Vogelsang in Der Schauspieldirektor (1786) for Adamberger, as well as several concert arias (K.420 and K.431) and the cantata Die Maurerfreude (K.471).
