= Christoph Friedrich Bretzner =

Christoph Friedrich Bretzner (10 December 1748 – 31 August 1807) was a Leipzig merchant famous for writing the libretto to a singspiel entitled Belmont und Constanze, oder Die Entführung aus dem Serail, produced in Berlin and adapted in 1782 by Wolfgang Amadeus Mozart and Gottlieb Stephanie as Die Entführung aus dem Serail. He died on 31 August 1807 after arriving for a theatrical performance in Leipzig.
