= Antonie Adamberger =

Austrian actress

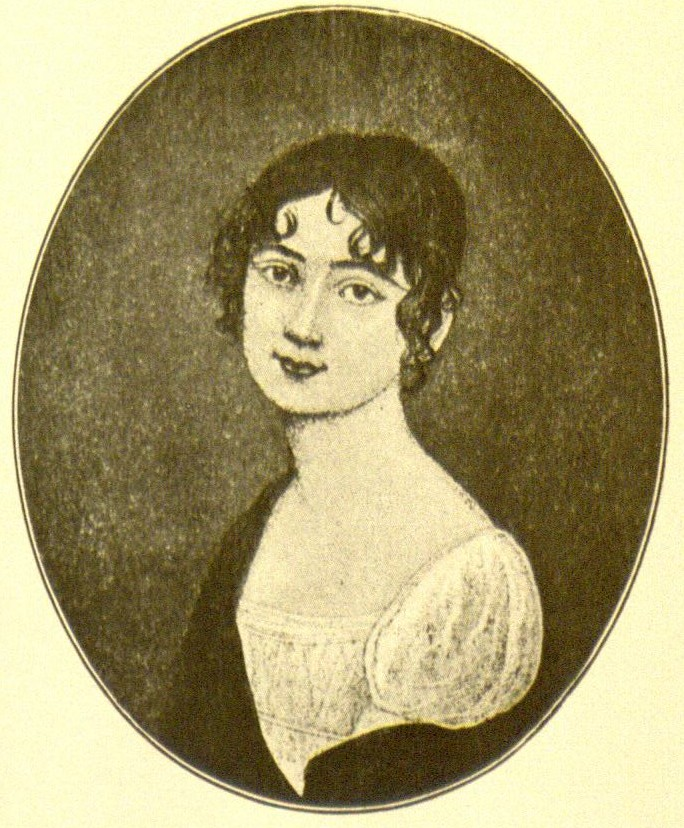
Antonie Adamberger. Engraving after a miniature by Johann Maria Monsomo

Antonie "Toni" Adamberger (31 December 1790 – 25 December 1867) was an Austrian stage actress.

== Biography ==
Born to the tenor Valentin Adamberger and the actress Maria Anna Jacquet, she was raised after the death of her parents by the poet Heinrich Joseph von Collin. Debuting at the age of sixteen on New Year's Day 1807 at the Burgtheater, she was immediately engaged as a Court Actress and "straightway found great acclaim as an ingénue, in both sentimental and some tragic parts." Antonie Adamberger quickly became the darling of the Viennese public, displaying her abilities as Beatrice in The Bride of Messina and also as Desdemona and Emilia Galotti.

Beethoven composed Klärchen's songs "Die Trommel gerühret" ("The drum is a-stirring") and "Freudvoll und leidvoll" ("Joyful and woeful") (first introduced at the Burgtheater on June 15, 1810) in his incidental music for Goethe's Egmont with Adamberger specifically in mind. She would later repeatedly and enthusiastically recall her collaboration with him.

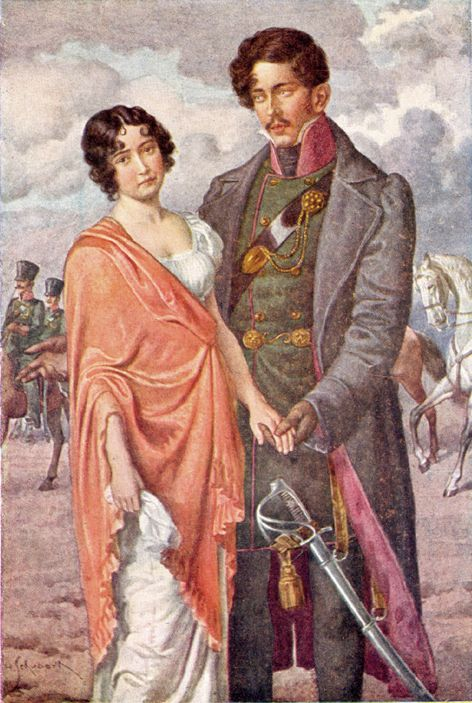
Antonie Adamberger with her fiancé Theodor Körner. Postcard after a painting by Hugo Schubert.

In 1812 Theodor Körner was employed as a principal author for the Burgtheater. Adamberger saw him for the first time at a rehearsal for his comic piece, Der grüne Domino ("The Green Domino"). In the same year she and the poet were betrothed. In February 1812, Körner write his drama Toni, in which his fiancée later undertook the leading part. Antonie Adamberger belonged to the circle of the Austrian novelist Karoline Pichler, who later wrote of her appearance in Toni:

Toni (Miss Adamberger) appeared in this leading rôle, and one could well recognize that the love of the poet had surrounded this character with a transfiguring power, womanly dignity, inspiration and nobility, that were obviously the work of his own passion and imagination, but nevertheless had many basic affinities with Antonie's character.

— Karoline Pichler: Denkwürdigkeiten meines Lebens (Mémoires of My Life), 1844

Until his death in 1813 Körner wrote numerous poems to her, particularly directing to her his tragedy Zriny after her success in Toni.

In 1817, some years after the poet's untimely death, Adamberger abandoned the stage and married the antiquary and numismatist Joseph Calasanza von Arneth. Two years later their son Alfred von Arneth was born. In 1820 Antonie became Reader to the Empress Caroline Augusta. In 1832 Adamberger was named Directress of the Karolinestift, an institute for the raising of soldiers' daughters.

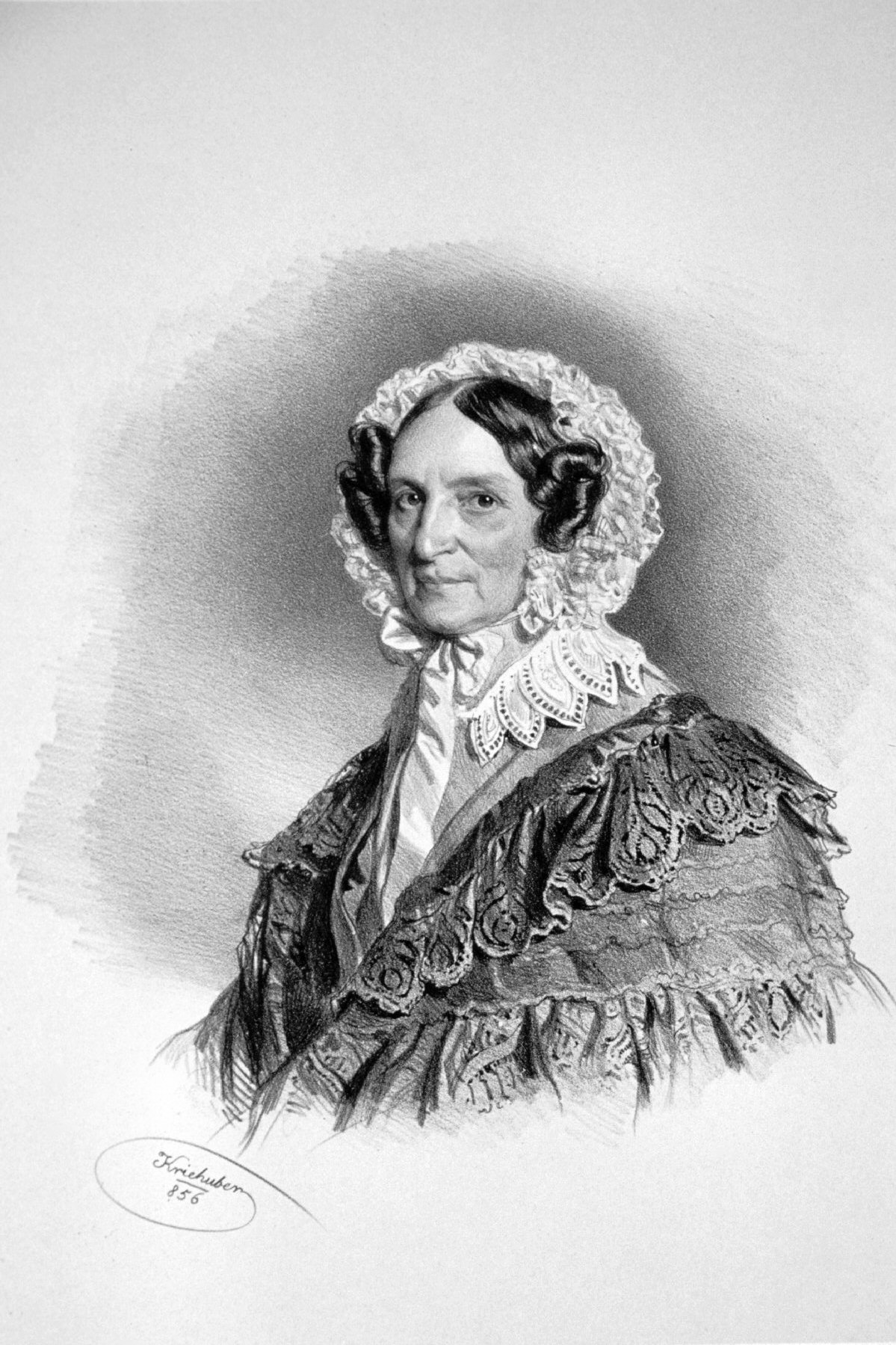
Antonie Adamberger, Lithograph by Josef Kriehuber, 1856

Antonie Adamberger died in Vienna in 1867. Her body lies in a "distinguished grave" (Ehrengrab) in the Vienna Central Cemetery (Group 14 A, Number 49).

Circa 1805 Joseph Hickel painted a portrait of Adamberger, from which Johann Maria Monsomo produced a miniature of her.

In 1894 a street in Vienna in the Leopoldstadt district (District 2) was named the Adambergergasse after her. The Arnethgasse in the Ottakring district (District 16) was named after her husband.

== Bibliography ==
- Hartl, Gerta: Arabesken des Lebens. Die Schauspielerin Toni Adamberger ("Arabesques of Life: Toni Adamberger the Actress"). Styria, Graz i.a. 1963.
- Jaden, Hans K. von. Theodor Körner und seine Braut ("Theodor Körner and His Bride"). Hauschild, Dresden 1896.
- Stein, Philipp. Deutsche Schauspieler: 2. Das XIX. Jahrhundert bis Anfang der vierziger Jahre ("German Actors: Vol. 2. The 19th Century to the Beginning of the 1840s"). Gesellschaft für Theatergeschichte ("Association for the History of the Theater"), Berlin 1908, p. 1.
- Zimmer, Hans. Theodor Körners Braut. Ein Lebens- und Charakterbild Antonie Adambergers ("Theodor Körner's Bride: A Biographical and Character Portrait of Antonie Adamberger"). Greiner & Pfeiffer, Stuttgart 1918.
