= Die Entführung aus dem Serail =

1782 opera by Wolfgang Amadeus Mozart

- Singspiel by W. A. Mozart
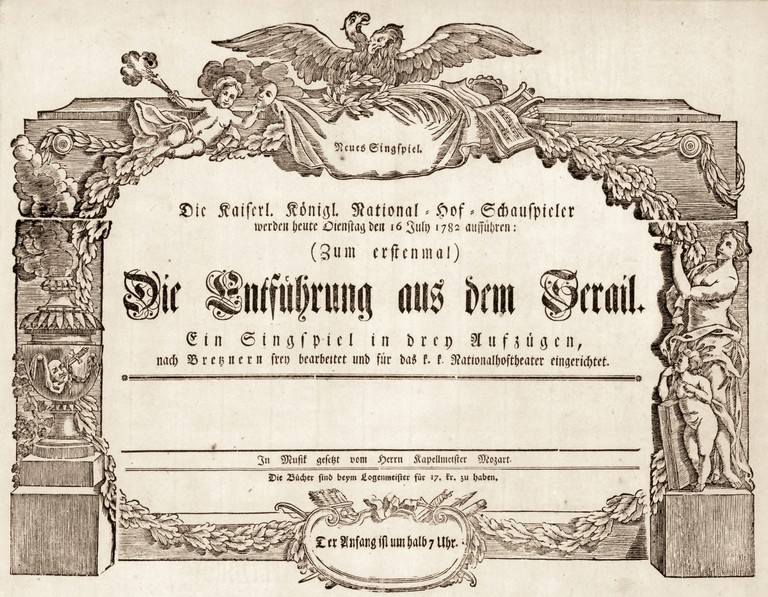
- Announcement for the premiere at the Burgtheater
- Translation: The Abduction from the Seraglio
- Librettist: Gottlieb Stephanie
- Language: German
- Based on: Christoph Friedrich Bretzner's Belmont und Constanze, oder Die Entführung aus dem Serail
- Premiere: 16 July 1782; Burgtheater, Vienna

Die Entführung aus dem Serail (German: [diː ʔɛntˈfyːʁʊŋ ʔaʊs dɛm zeˈʁaɪ]) (K. 384; The Abduction from the Seraglio; also known as Il Seraglio) is a singspiel in three acts by Wolfgang Amadeus Mozart. The German libretto is by Gottlieb Stephanie, based on Christoph Friedrich Bretzner's Belmont und Constanze, oder Die Entführung aus dem Serail. The plot concerns the attempt of the hero Belmonte, assisted by his servant Pedrillo, to rescue his beloved Constanze from the seraglio of Pasha Selim. The work premiered on 16 July 1782 at the Vienna Burgtheater, with the composer conducting.

== Origins ==
The opera loosely refers to the practice of the North African Barbary corsairs, who operated primarily in the western Mediterranean, of hijacking ships belonging to Christian states. Under the pretext of jihad, the ship and cargo were sold or returned only after a ransom was paid. The actual goal, however, was the kidnapping of crew and passengers, to extort ransom money or to sell them into slavery. It was also common to force affected seafaring nations of non-Muslim faith to pay protection money or tribute. The corsairs acted on behalf of or with the acquiescence of the local Muslim rulers in Algiers, Tunis and Tripoli. This type of state-backed piracy finally ended after the French conquest of Algiers (1830).

The company that first sponsored the opera was the Nationalsingspiel ("national Singspiel"), a pet project (1778–1783) of the Austrian emperor Joseph II. The Emperor had set up the company to perform works in the German language (as opposed to the Italian opera style widely popular in Vienna). This project was ultimately given up as a failure, but along the way it produced a number of successes, mostly a series of translated works. Mozart's opera emerged as its outstanding original success.

The inspector of the Nationalsingspiel was Gottlieb Stephanie. When the 25-year-old Mozart arrived in Vienna in 1781, seeking professional opportunity, one of the first tasks to which he addressed himself was to become acquainted with Stephanie and lobby him for an opera commission. To this end, he brought a copy of his earlier unfinished opera Zaide and showed it to Stephanie, who was duly impressed. Mozart also made a strong impression on the manager of the theater, Count Franz Xaver Orsini-Rosenberg, when in the home of Mozart's friend and patroness Maria Wilhelmine Thun the Count heard him play excerpts from his opera Idomeneo, premiered with great success the previous year in Munich. With this backing, it was agreed that Stephanie would find appropriate material and prepare a libretto for Mozart. Stephanie complied by preparing an altered version of an earlier work Belmont und Constanze, oder Die Entführung aus dem Serail without attributing or seeking permission from its original author Christoph Friedrich Bretzner. Bretzner later complained loudly and publicly about the theft.

== Composition ==
Mozart received the libretto from Stephanie on 29 July 1781. He had few opportunities to compose professionally during the summer and he set to work on the libretto at a very rapid pace, finishing three major numbers in just two days. A letter to his father Leopold indicates he was excited about the prospect of having his opera performed in Vienna and worked enthusiastically on his project.

At first Mozart thought he needed to finish his opera in only two months, because tentative plans were made to perform it at the September visit of the Russian Grand Duke Paul (son of Catherine the Great and heir to the Russian throne). However, it was ultimately decided to perform operas by Gluck instead, giving Mozart more time.

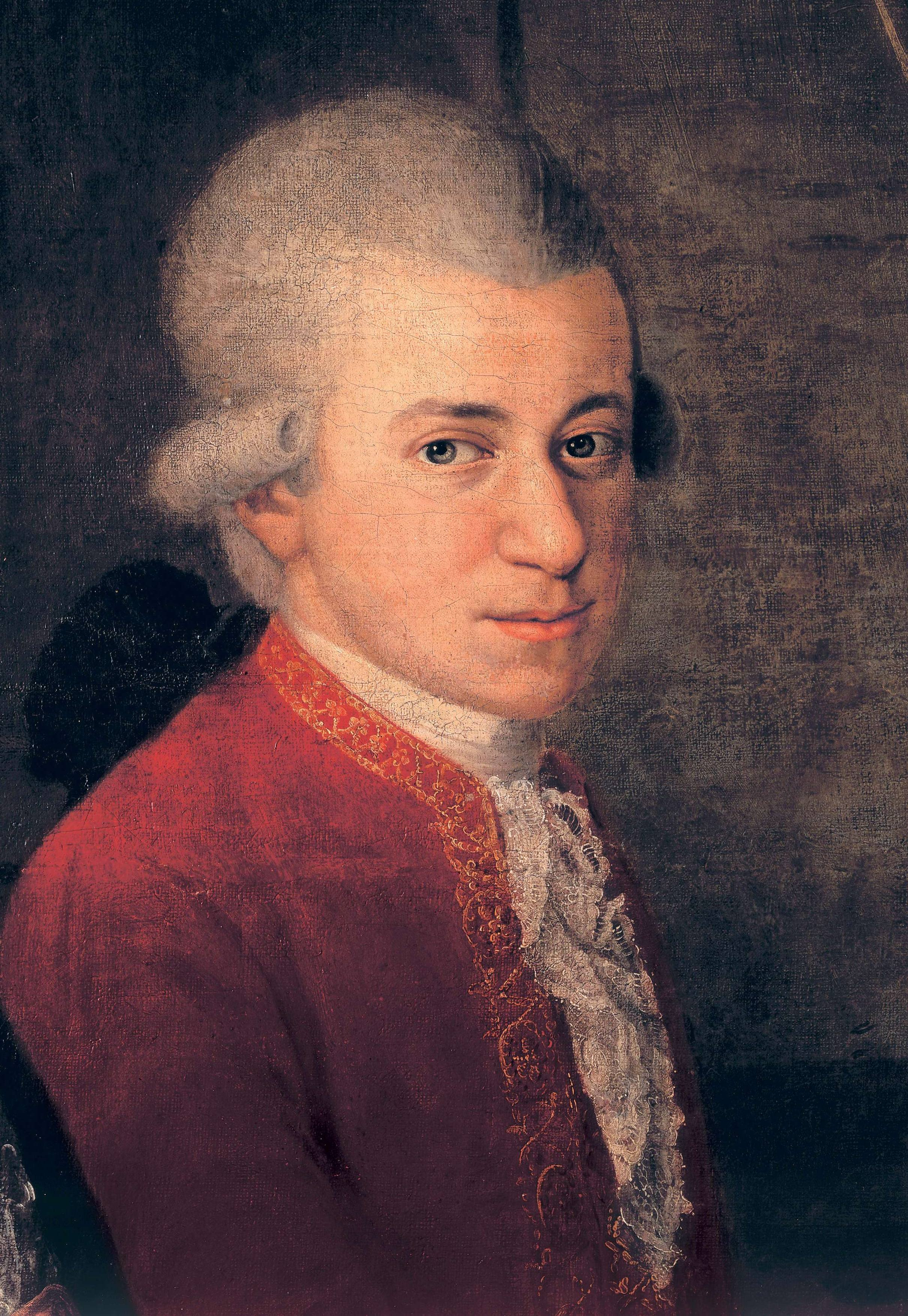
Mozart around the time of composition

It was around this time that Mozart articulated his views about the role of the composer and the librettist in the preparation of an opera. He wrote to his father (13 October 1781):

I would say that in an opera the poetry must be altogether the obedient daughter of the music. Why are Italian comic operas popular everywhere – in spite of the miserable libretti? … Because the music reigns supreme, and when one listens to it all else is forgotten. An opera is sure of success when the plot is well worked out, the words written solely for the music and not shoved in here and there to suit some miserable rhyme ... The best thing of all is when a good composer, who understands the stage and is talented enough to make sound suggestions, meets an able poet, that true phoenix; in that case, no fears need be entertained as to the applause – even of the ignorant.

It would seem that something along these lines did happen – that is, Mozart decided to play a major role in the shaping of the libretto, insisting that Stephanie make changes for dramatic and musical effect. On 26 September Mozart wrote:

Now comes the rub! The first act was finished more than three weeks ago, as was also one aria in act 2 and the drunken duet ["Vivat Bacchus", act 2] ... But I cannot compose any more, because the whole story is being altered – and, to tell the truth, at my own request. At the beginning of act 3 there is a charming quintet or rather finale, but I would prefer to have it at the end of act 2. In order to make this practicable, great changes must be made, in fact an entirely new plot must be introduced – and Stephanie is up to his neck in other work. So we must have a little patience.

Mozart was evidently quite pleased to have in Stephanie a librettist who would listen to him. The same letter also says:

Everyone abuses Stephanie. It may be the case he is only friendly to my face. But after all he is preparing the libretto for me – and, what is more, exactly as I want it – and by Heaven, I don't ask anything more of him.

With the delays for rewriting, the composition took several more months. The premiere took place on 16 July 1782, at the Burgtheater in Vienna.

== Character ==
Die Entführung aus dem Serail is in the genre of "Singspiel", thus the music lacks recitatives and consists entirely of set numbers. As Spike Hughes notes, the action is mostly carried forward by the spoken dialogue, so the libretto gave Mozart little opportunity to display an achievement for which his later operas are celebrated, namely the construction of scenes in which the plot is both reflected in and driven forward by the music.

Die Entführung is lighthearted and frequently comic, with little of the deep character exploration or darker feelings found in Mozart's later operas. The opera was inspired by a contemporary interest in the exotic culture of the Ottoman Empire, a nation which had only recently ceased to be a military threat to Austria. Mozart's opera includes a Westernized version of Turkish music, based very loosely on the Turkish Janissary band music.

Certain aspects of the opera conform to an eighteenth-century European view of orientalism. The Pasha's titular harem, for example, reprised themes of sexual libertinage. And the comically sinister overseer, Osmin, is a send-up of earlier stereotypes of Turkish despotism. However, the opera also defies the stereotype of despotic Turkish culture, since its climax entails a selfless act of forgiveness on the part of the Pasha.

The music includes some of the composer's most spectacular and difficult arias. Osmin's act 3 aria "O, wie will ich triumphieren" includes characteristic 18th century coloratura passage work, and twice goes down to a low D (D_{2}), one of the lowest notes demanded of any voice in opera. Perhaps the most famous aria in the opera is the long and elaborate "Martern aller Arten" ("Tortures of all kinds") for Konstanze, an outstanding challenge for sopranos. Konstanze sings in a kind of sinfonia concertante with four solo players from the orchestra; the strikingly long orchestral introduction, without stage action, also poses problems for stage directors.

The virtuosity of these roles is perhaps attributable to the fact that when he took up the task of composing the opera, Mozart already knew the outstanding reputations of the singers for whom he was writing, and he tailored the arias to their strengths. The first Osmin was Ludwig Fischer, a bass noted for his wide range and skill in leaping over large intervals with ease. Similarly, Mozart wrote of the first Konstanze, Caterina Cavalieri, "I have sacrificed Konstanze's aria a little to the flexible throat of Mlle. Cavalieri."

== Reception ==
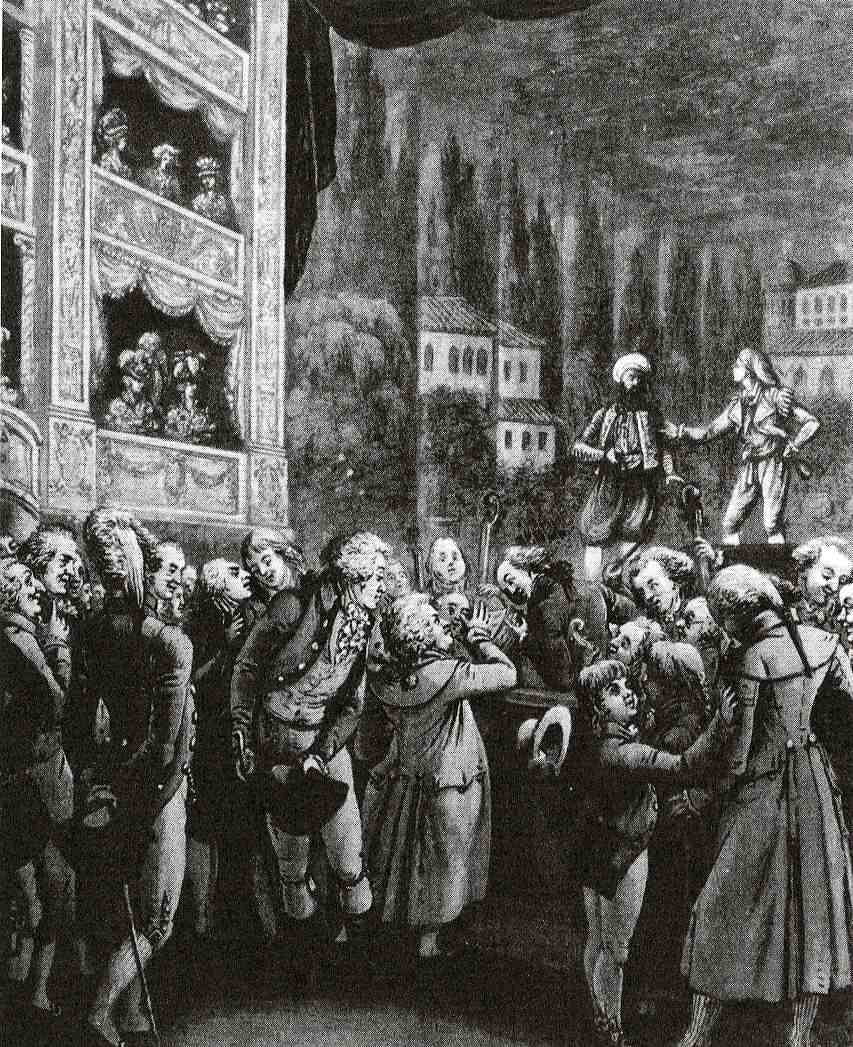
Mozart (at center) attended a performance of his own opera Die Entführung aus dem Serail while visiting Berlin in 1789. Franz Frankenberg performed the role of Osmin, Friedrich Ernst Wilhelm Greibe played Pedrillo.

The opera was a huge success. The first two performances brought in the large sum of 1200 florins. The work was repeatedly performed in Vienna during Mozart's lifetime, and throughout German-speaking Europe. In 1787, Goethe wrote (concerning his own efforts as a librettist):

All our endeavour ... to confine ourselves to what is simple and limited was lost when Mozart appeared. Die Entführung aus dem Serail conquered all, and our own carefully written piece has never been so much as mentioned in theater circles.

Although the opera greatly raised Mozart's standing with the public as a composer, it did not make him rich: he was paid a flat fee of 100 Imperial ducats (about 450 florins) for his work, and made no profits from the many subsequent performances.

The opera reached Paris in November 1801, when Frédéric Blasius conducted Ellmenreich's company in performances at the Théâtre de la Gaîté.

The American premiere in English was given by the Rochester Opera Company on 1 November 1926 under the direction of Vladimir Rosing. A second production with a new English libretto by Robert A. Simon was debuted by the American Opera Company at the Gallo Opera House in New York on 31 January 1928, and was then performed on tour in Boston and Chicago.

=== "Too many notes" ===
The complexity of Mozart's work noted by Goethe also plays a role in a well-known tale about the opera which appeared in the early (1798) biography of Mozart by Franz Xaver Niemetschek. In the version of the anecdote printed in Bartlett's Book of Anecdotes, a reference work, the story is told like this:

The Emperor Joseph II commissioned the creation of The Abduction from the Seraglio, but when he heard it, he complained to Mozart, "That is too fine for my ears – there are too many notes." Mozart replied, "There are just as many notes as there should be."

The authenticity of this story is not accepted by all scholars. Moreover, the version given by the Bartlett reference (and many other places) includes a translation of the original German that is dubious. The original reads: "Zu schön für unsere Ohren, und gewaltig viel Noten, lieber Mozart!" "Too many notes" is not a plausible translation of the German phrase "gewaltig viel Noten". Mautner, translating Niemetschek, renders this as "an extraordinary number of notes", while Branscombe translates it simply as "very many notes". William Stafford translates the phrase as "Too beautiful for our ears, and an enormous number of notes, dear Mozart!" The anecdote, which is often repeated, is considered by some scholars to unfairly give the Emperor a bad reputation concerning both his musical abilities and his appreciation and support of Mozart.

== Roles ==
Roles, voice types, premiere cast
Role	Voice type	Premiere cast, 16 July 1782 Conductor: W. A. Mozart
Belmonte, a Spanish nobleman	tenor	Valentin Adamberger
Konstanze, betrothed to Belmonte	soprano	Caterina Cavalieri
Blonde, Konstanze's English maid	soprano	Therese Teyber
Pedrillo, Belmonte's servant	tenor	Johann Ernst Dauer
Osmin, overseer for the Pasha	bass	Ludwig Fischer
Bassa Selim, the Pasha	spoken role	Dominik Jautz
Klaas, boatman	spoken role	unknown
Chorus of Janissaries

== Instrumentation ==
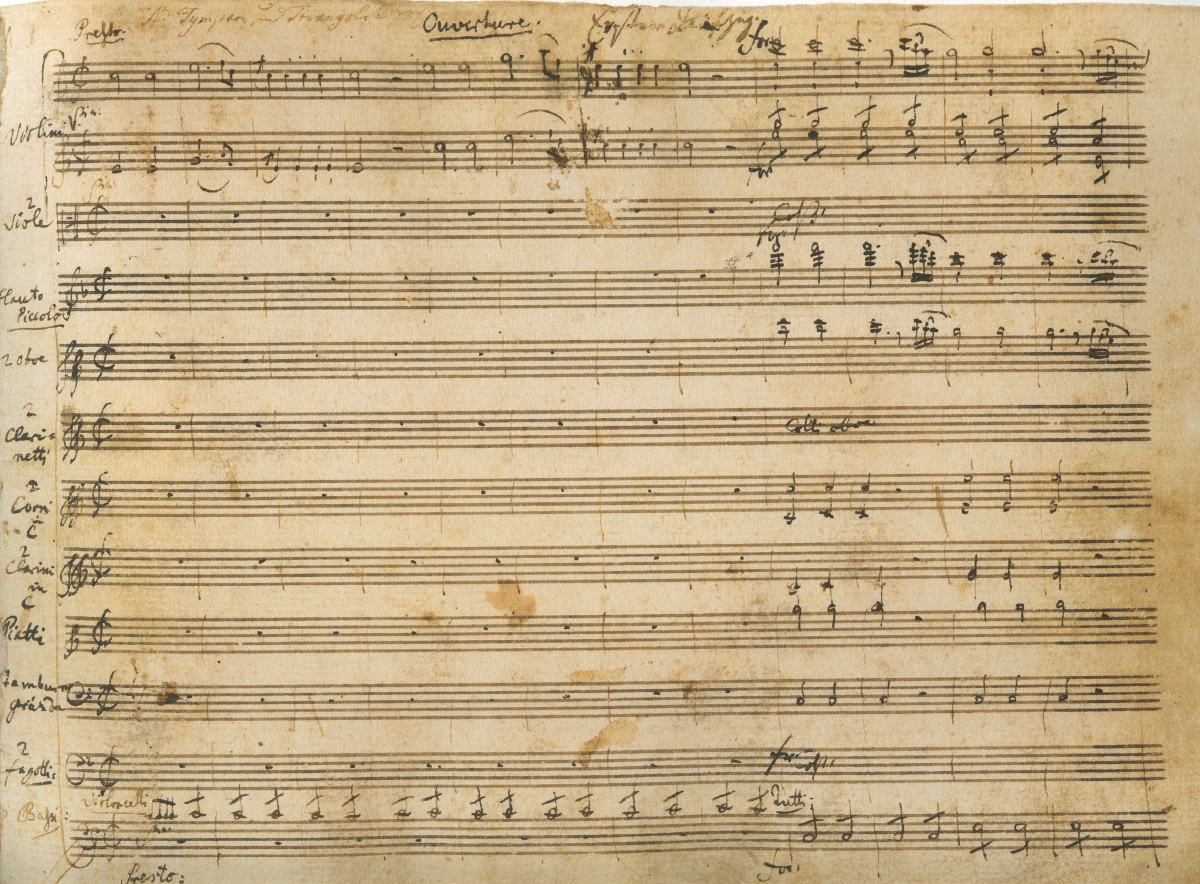
Autograph manuscript of the beginning of the overture

The singers perform with a Classical-era orchestra: pairs of flutes, oboes, clarinets, bassoons, horns, trumpets, a set of two timpani, and strings. They are augmented with the instruments needed for "Turkish" music: a 'tamburo grande' (or 'tamburo turco'), cymbals, triangles, and piccolo. The aria "Traurigkeit ward mir zum Lose" is augmented by two basset horns.

The orchestra for the premiere included a number of eminent musicians of the day: first cellist Joseph Franz Weigl, first oboist Josef Triebensee, second oboist Johann Went second horn Joseph Leutgeb, and the clarinettist brothers Anton and Johann Stadler. In the first violin section was Franz de Paula Hofer, who later became Mozart's brother-in-law. The four musicians who played the "Turkish" instruments remain anonymous, though it is known that they were recruited for this purpose by one Franz Tyron, Kapellmeister of the Austrian Second Field Artillery Regiment.

== Synopsis ==
Place: the country house of the Pasha (German "Bassa"), in Turkey
Time: 16th century

=== Act 1 ===
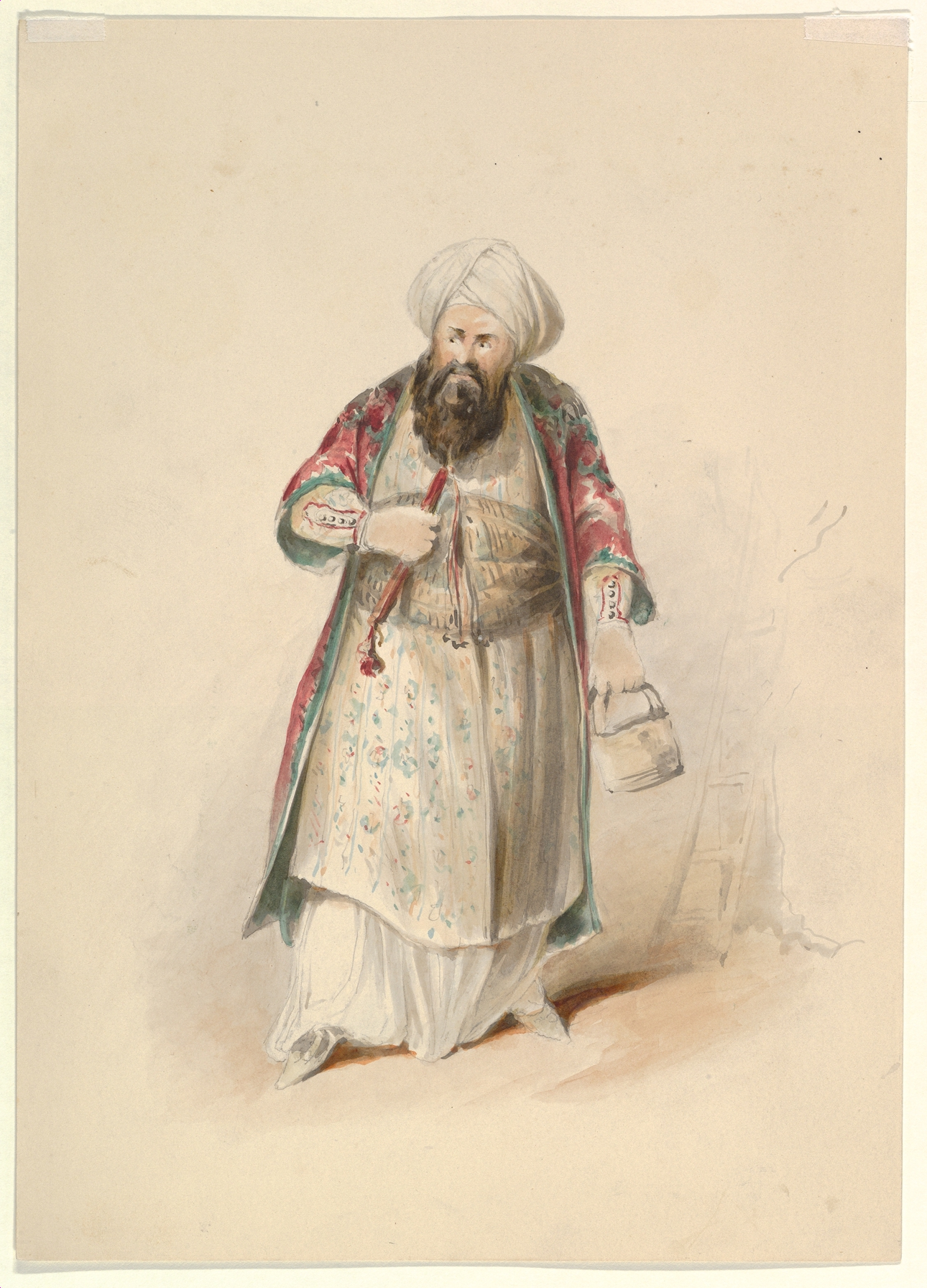
Costume study for Osmin, c. 1830–1850, by Christof Fries, Metropolitan Museum of Art

After a lively overture Belmonte enters, looking for his betrothed, Konstanze, who, with her English servant, Blonde, has fallen into the hands of pirates and been sold to Pasha Selim (Aria: "Hier soll ich dich denn sehen" – "Here surely I must find her"). Osmin, the Pasha's bad-tempered servant, comes to pluck figs in the garden and contemptuously ignores Belmonte's questions (Aria: "Wer ein Liebchen hat gefunden" – "You may think, you've found a maiden"). Belmonte tries to obtain news of his servant, Pedrillo, who has been captured with the women and is serving as a servant in the Pasha's palace. Osmin replies with insults and abuse (Duet: "Verwünscht seist du samt deinem Liede!" – "The devil take you and your song, sir"). Belmonte leaves in disgust. Pedrillo enters and Osmin rages at him, vowing to get him tortured and killed in many different ways (Aria: "Solche hergelaufne Laffen" – "These young men who go a-spying"). Osmin leaves and Belmonte enters and happily reunites with Pedrillo. Together, they resolve to rescue Konstanze and Blonde, who is Pedrillo's fiancée (Aria: "Konstanze, Konstanze, dich wiederzusehen ... O wie ängstlich" – "Konstanze, Konstanze, to see thee again ... Oh what trembling").

Accompanied by a chorus of Janissaries ("Singt dem großen Bassa Lieder" – "Sing to the mighty Pasha Selim"), Pasha Selim appears with Konstanze, for whose love he strives in vain (Aria of Konstanze: "Ach ich liebte" – "How I loved him"). Pedrillo tricks the Pasha into hiring Belmonte as an architect. When Belmonte and Pedrillo try to enter the palace, Osmin bars their way, but they hurry past him anyway (Terzett: "Marsch! Marsch! Marsch! Trollt euch fort!" – "March! March! March! Clear off!").

=== Act 2 ===
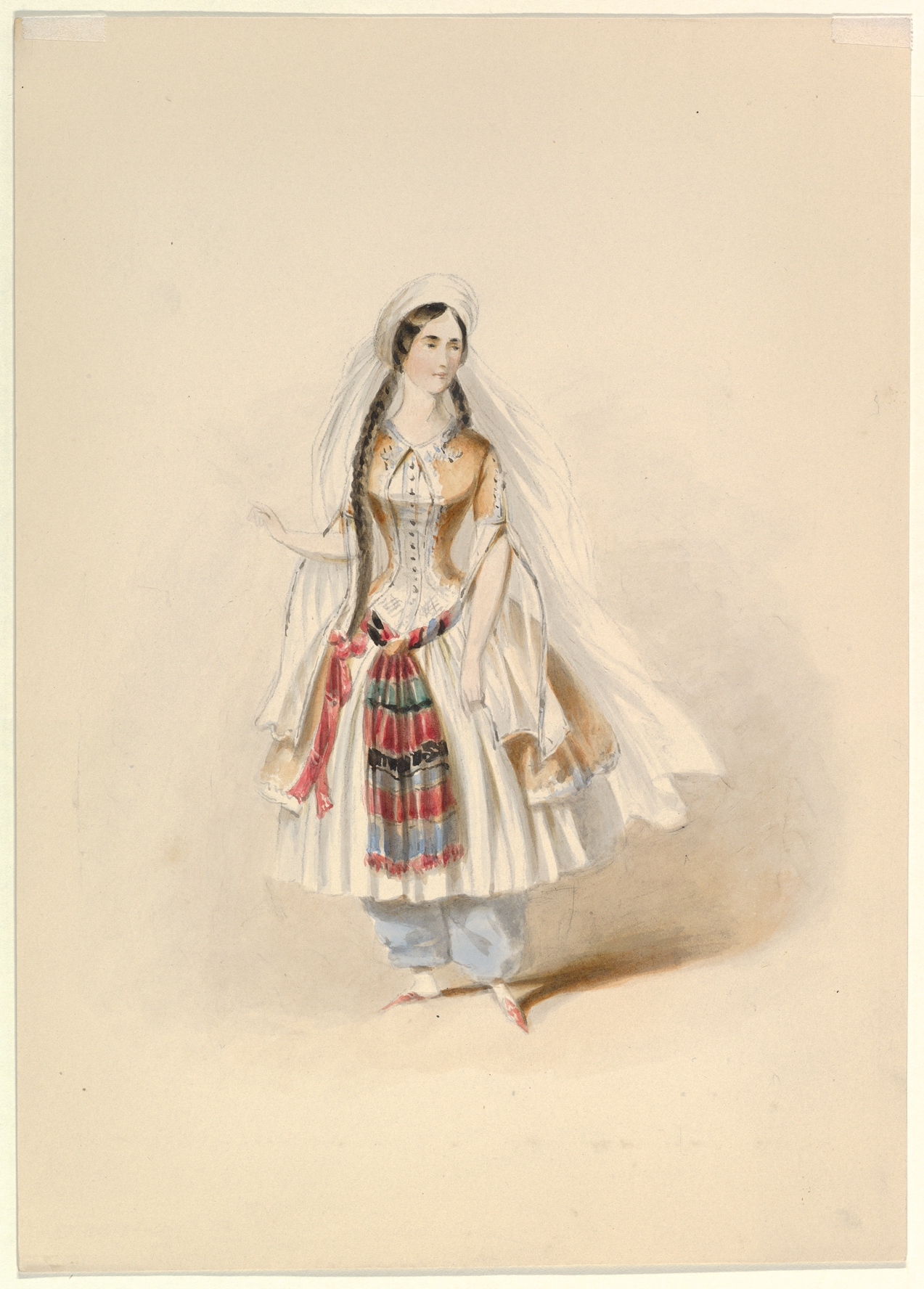
Costume study for Blonde by Fries

The Pasha has given Blonde to Osmin, to be his slave; however, she defiantly rebuffs her new master's rough lovemaking attempts (Aria: "Durch Zärtlichkeit und Schmeicheln" – "With smiles and kind caresses"), threatens to scratch out his eyes, and chases him out of the room (Duet: "Ich gehe, doch rate ich dir" – "I'm going, but mark what I say"). Konstanze enters in distress (Aria: "Welcher Wechsel herrscht in meiner Seele … Traurigkeit ward mir zum Lose" – "Oh what sorrow overwhelms my spirit ... Endless grief tortures my spirit"). The Pasha enters, demands Konstanze's love, and threatens to use force, but she resolutely rejects him (Aria: "Martern aller Arten" – "Tortures unrelenting"). Left alone, he muses on her determination to remain chaste, which increases his desire for her.

Pedrillo informs Blonde that Belmonte has come and is planning to rescue them, filling Blonde with joy (Aria: "Welche Wonne, welche Lust" – "Oh, the happy, happy day"). After singing a short ditty to boost his courage (Aria: "Frisch zum Kampfe" – "Now Pedrillo, now for battle!"), Pedrillo invites Osmin to drink (Duet: "Vivat Bacchus! Bacchus lebe!" – "Here's to Bacchus, long live Bacchus"). Despite his religious prohibition against alcoholic beverages, Osmin drinks heavily and falls asleep. Konstanze joins Belmonte who declares his love (Aria: "Wenn der Freude Tränen fließen" – "When tears of joy flow"). The two couples reunite (Quartet, Belmonte, Konstanze, Pedrillo, Blonde: "Ach Belmonte! Ach, mein Leben" – "Ah, Belmonte, ah my dear one!"). After their initial expressions of love and joy, Belmonte and Pedrillo both question anxiously whether their respective fiancees have remained faithful during their forced separation; to their delight, the women respond with indignation and dismay, and Blonde slaps Pedrillo's face. The two men apologize for their lack of confidence; the women forgive them for their offensive questions.

=== Act 3 ===
Klaas and Pedrillo come to the garden with ladders (Aria, Belmonte: "Ich baue ganz auf deine Stärke" – "Love, only love, can now direct me"). Pedrillo attracts the attention of the women by singing a ballad about a rescue similar to the one he is planning (Romanze, Pedrillo: "In Mohrenland gefangen war" – "In Moorish lands a maiden fair"). However, Osmin enters, sees the ladders, and rouses the castle. Osmin exults in the prospect of seeing them all hanged (Aria: "O, wie will ich triumphieren" – "My triumphant hour's approaching"). Belmonte pleads for their lives and tells Pasha Selim that his father is a Spanish Grandee and Governor of Oran, named Lostados, and will pay a generous ransom. Unfortunately, Pasha Selim and Lostados are long-standing enemies. The Pasha rejoices in the opportunity to subject his enemy's son to a horrible death. He leaves Belmonte and Konstanze to bid each other a last farewell; they lovingly assure each other that being tortured to death will be a pleasure, so long as they get tortured to death together (Duet: "Welch ein Geschick! O Qual der Seele.... Weh, du soltest für mich sterben" – "What dreadful fate conspires against us.... Woe, you will die because of me"). However, the Pasha then decides that he can make a better point against Lostados by showing mercy and releasing Belmonte and his friends. All are set at liberty – much to the dismay of Osmin (Finale: "Nie werd' ich deine Huld verkennen" – "Your noble mercy passes measure").

== Adaptations ==
The Australian Broadcasting Commission made a TV production in 1961 as the English-language The Abduction from the Seraglio, using outdoor filming in addition to the stage setting.

The American post-modernist writer Donald Barthelme wrote a surreal comic short story entitled "The Abduction from the Seraglio" (published in The New Yorker in January 1978, collected in Great Days, Farrar, Strous & Giroux 1979, and in Sixty Stories, 1981) in which Belmonte, as narrator, is reconfigured into a cowboy sculptor (whose arias are Country & Western songs), Constanze into his ex-lover, a counter-culture free spirit seduced by the Pasha, who in turn is a Plymouth automobile dealer worth five million dollars a year. Belmonte's rescue attempt fails as Constanze decides to stay with the Pasha, and he is left bereft.

Music professor, composer, and humorist Peter Schickele claims to have "discovered" the fictional composer P. D. Q. Bach's The Abduction of Figaro (1984), a pastiche of the Entführung and Mozart's The Marriage of Figaro.

The Finnish composer Aulis Sallinen wrote an opera called The Palace (first performed 1995); it contains characters whose names are adapted from Abduction and loosely uses elements of the plot of Mozart's opera as the starting point of a satirical fantasy.
