= Giuseppe Weidmann =

Giuseppe Weidmann (1742–1810) was an Austrian drama actor.

He was born in Vienna to a poor family. He interrupted his studies to become an actor, and specialized in playing the grotesque stock characters, perhaps a Hanswurst for the theater in Brünn. After a spell in theaters in Vienna and Salzburg; in 1765, he began reciting comic parts for audiences in Prague. He produced a single drama, titled Sipper; he performed then in Linz and Gratz; but was called by Emperor Joseph II to perform in Vienna. Weidmann was named one of five inspectors of the court theater.
