= Belmont und Constanze =

Belmont und Constanze, oder Die Entführung aus dem Serail ("Belmonte and Constance, or The Abduction from the Seraglio") by Christoph Friedrich Bretzner is a libretto, published in 1781, telling the story of the hero Belmonte, assisted by his servant Pedrillo, attempting to rescue his beloved Constanze from the seraglio of the Pasha Selim. First set to music by Johann André and performed as a singspiel in Berlin in 1781, it became famous as the story on which Wolfgang Amadeus Mozart based his opera Die Entführung aus dem Serail (The Abduction from the Seraglio).

== See also ==
- Seraglio
