= Grand Serail of Aleppo =

Coordinates: 36°11′50″N 37°09′46″E

Grand Serail
- سراي حلب الكبير
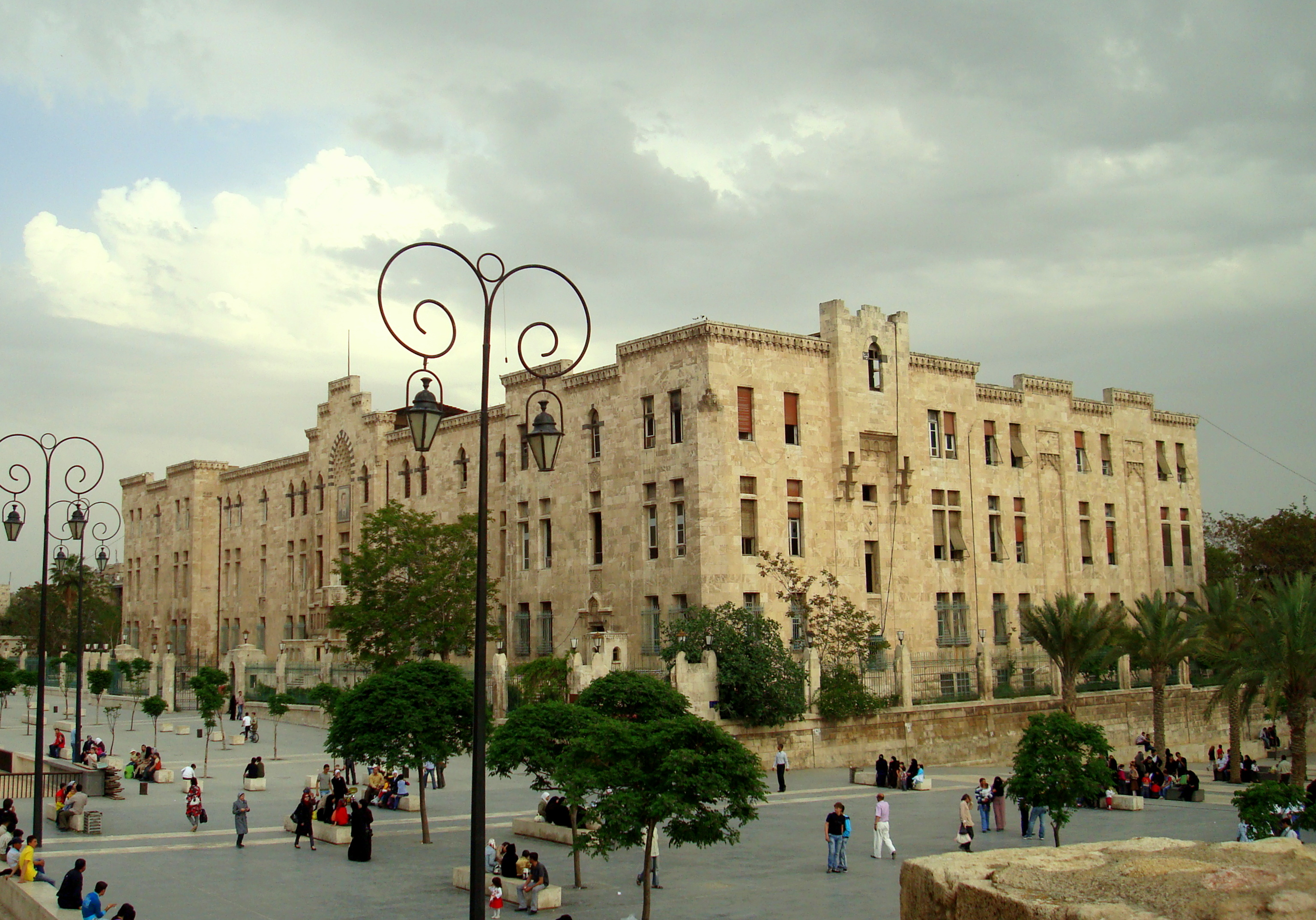

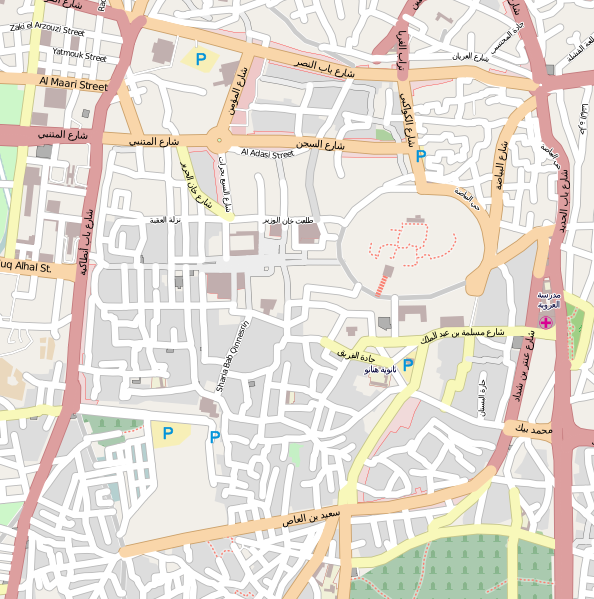
- Location within Ancient City of Aleppo
- Former names: Grand Serail d'Alep

General information
- Architectural style: Syrian
- Location: Aleppo, Syria, Old city
- Construction started: 1928
- Completed: 1933
- Inaugurated: 15 April 1933
- Owner: Government of Syria

Technical details
- Floor count: 3

Renovating team
- Architect: Kegham Akgulian
- Structural engineer: Kevork Baboyan

The Grand Serail (Arabic: سراي حلب الكبير, French: Grand Serail d'Alep) was the former seat of the governor of the Syrian city of Aleppo. It was built between 1928 and 1933 to serve as the main government building in the city. It was opened in 1933 during the period of the mayor Nabih Martini.

The building is located to the south of the Citadel of Aleppo and adjacent to its main entrance. It is surrounded by the Citadel square and Al-Sultaniyah Madrasa from the west, Al-Otrush Mosque from the south, the Palace of Justice and Hammam Yalbugha from the east and the Citadel from the north.

== History ==
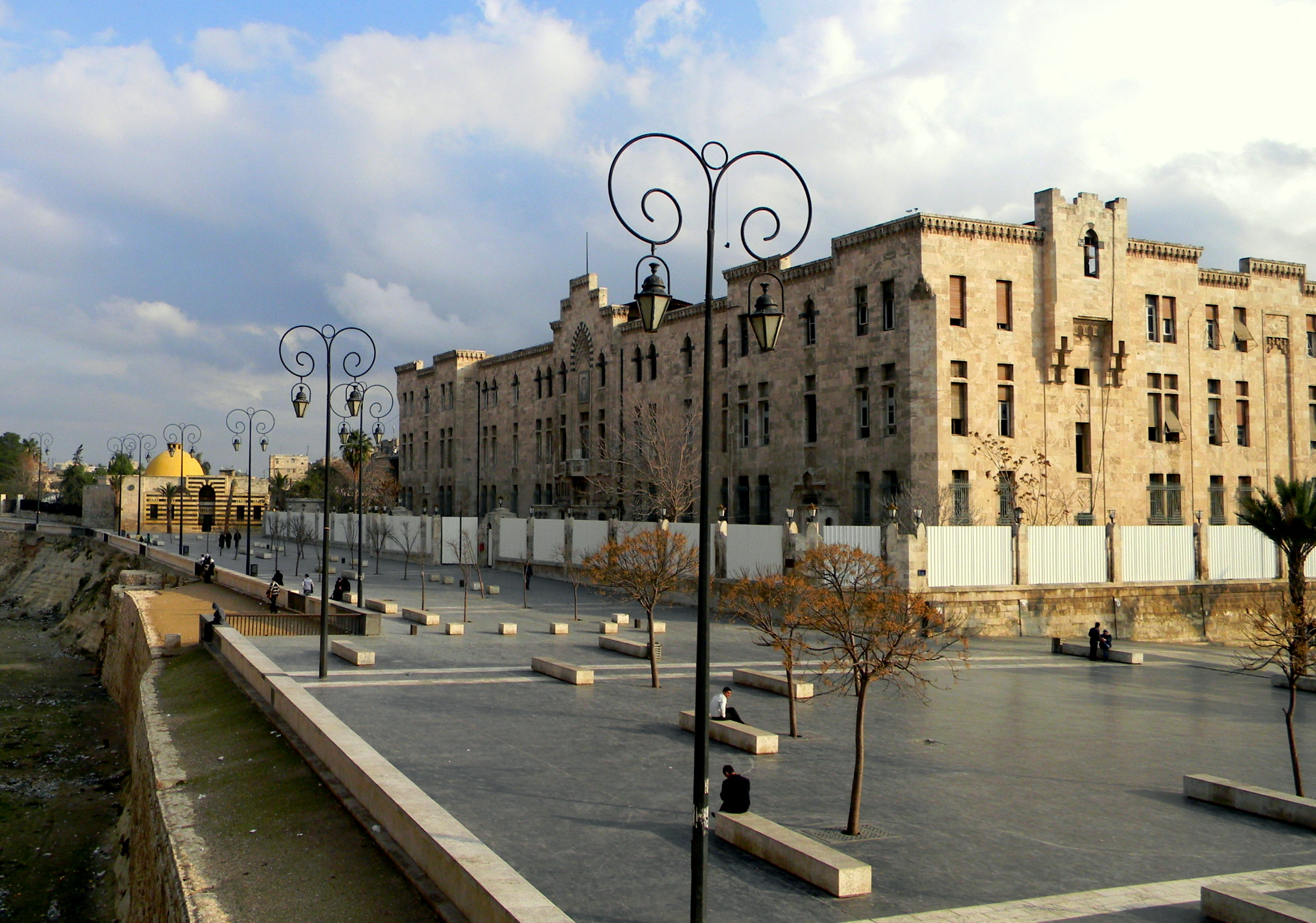
The Serail in 2011

The idea for the construction of a new government house came when the State of Aleppo was declared by the French General Henri Gouraud in September 1920. However, the construction started only in 1928, after the formation of the Syrian state under the French mandate. The serail was designed by the Syrian-Armenian architect Kegham Akgulian, and the construction was carried out under the supervision of another Syrian-Armenian engineer Kevork Baboyan.

The inauguration of the building took place on 15 April 1933 to become the house of the government in Aleppo and the regular seat of the governor and the mayor of the city. It served as the house of the government until 2008, when the new building of the Aleppo city council was opened.

In August 2014, the building was almost completely destroyed during the Syrian Civil War, by an underground explosion conducted by rebels against Syrian Army troops.

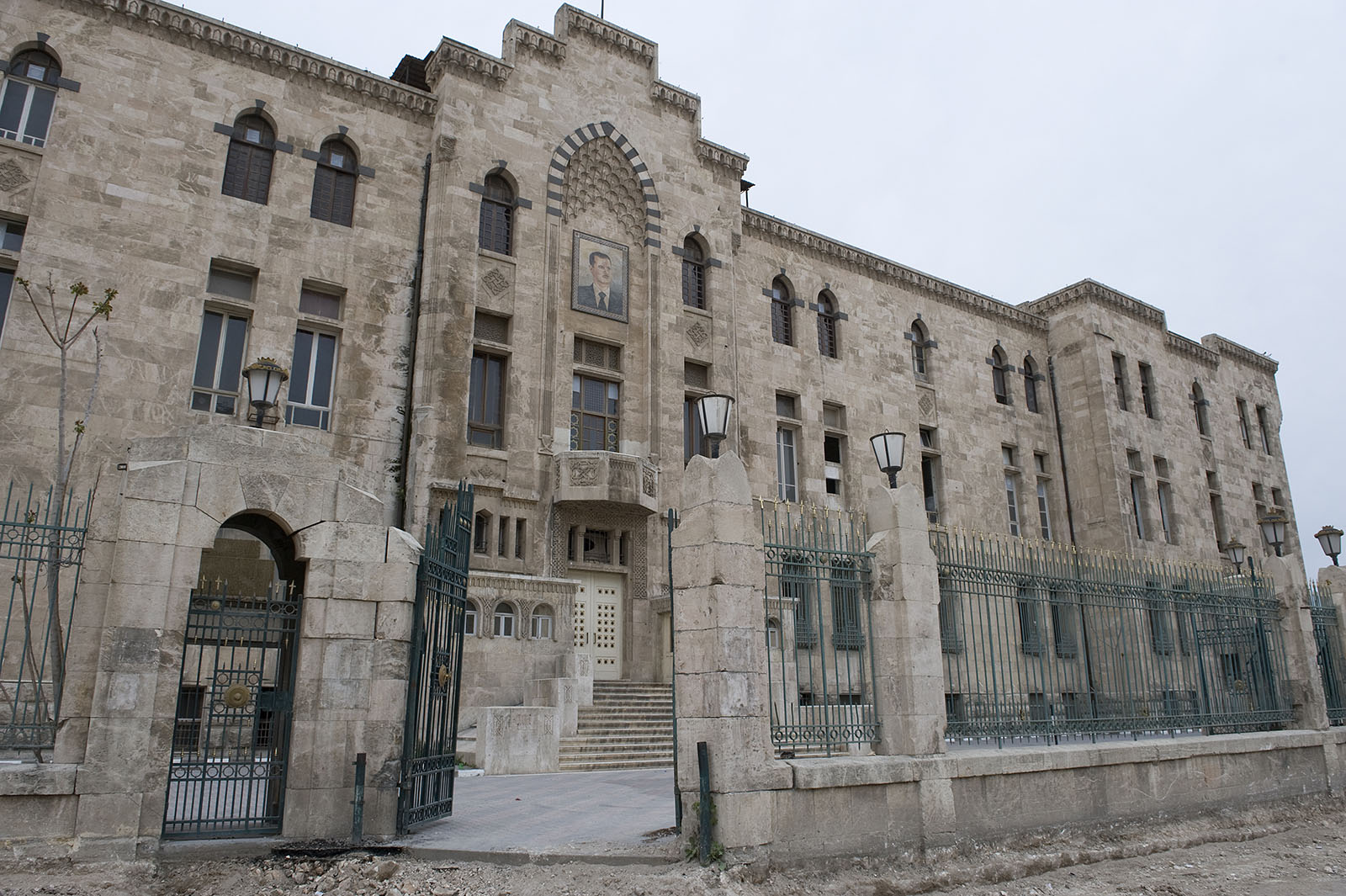
Grand Serail in Aleppo in 2009

== See also ==
- Grand Serail in Beirut
