= Johanna Sacco =

Austrian ballet dancer and stage actor

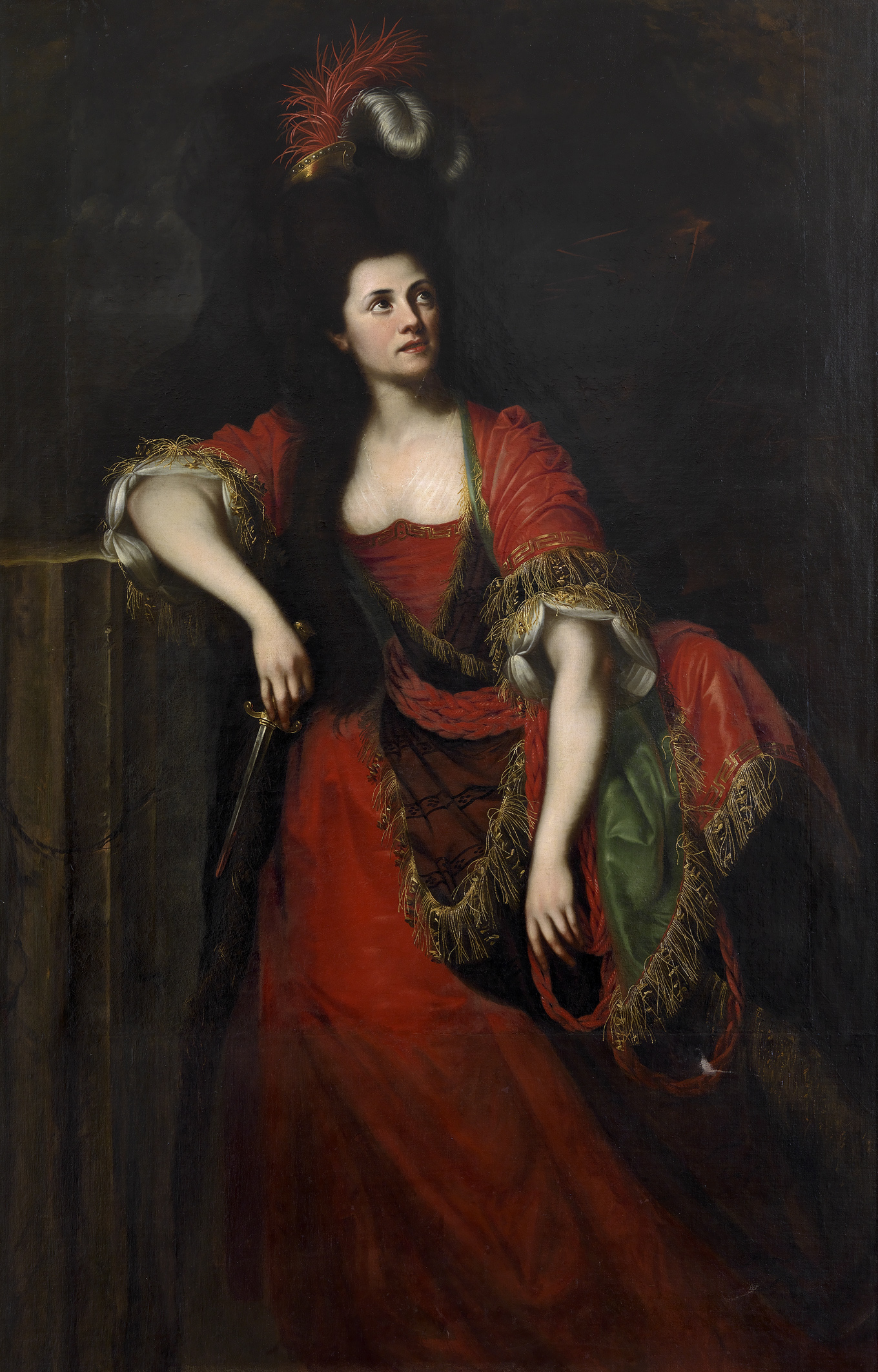
Joseph Hickel; Johanna Sacco as Medea, 1786

Johanna Sacco (16 November 1754, Prague – 21 December 1802, Vienna) was an Austrian ballerina and stage actress.

She was engaged at the Burgtheater from 1776–1793 and enjoyed widespread fame and popularity among all classes of Viennese society.
