= Anna Stephanie =

Austrian stage actor

Anna Stephanie née Mika (1751–1802) was an Austrian stage actress living in the Holy Roman Empire.

She was engaged at the Burgtheater in 1771–1802, where she was foremost known for her roles as heroines in tragedies. Among her roles where Minna in „Minna von Barnhelm“, Marie in „Deutschen Hausvater“, and Orsina in Lessings „Emilie Galotti“. She was married to the actor Gottfried Stephanie.
