= Ernst Brandes (journalist) =

German lawyer, writer and scholar

Ernst Brandes (3 October 1758 – 13 May 1810) was a Hannoverian lawyer, official, writer, and scholar.

Brandes witnessed the French Revolution as a journalist. Influenced by Edmund Burke, he is regarded by commentators as a voice of conservatism and Anglophile political views during the Enlightenment.

His 1787 treatise Ueber die Weiber argued against the emerging feminist notion of the equality of the sexes.

== Works ==
- Ueber die Weiber (Leipzig, 1787)

== Bibliography ==
- Carl Haase, "Ernst Brandes in den Jahren 1805 und 1806. Fünf Briefe an den Grafen Münster". In Niedersächsisches Jahrbuch für Landesgeschichte (NsJbLG). 34, 1962, S. 194
- Walter Richter, "Der Esperance- und ZN-Orden." in Einst und Jetzt. Jahrbuch 1974 des Vereins für corpsstudentische Geschichtsforschung, S. 30–54
