= L'isle déserte =

Opera comique by Franz Beck

L’isle déserte is a 1779 opera comique by Franz Ignaz Beck to a libretto by the Comte d'Ossun after Metastasio's libretto l'isola disabitata of 1754, coincidentally reset in Italian by Haydn in the same year in the same year as Beck. The libretto had been translated into French already in 1759. Haydn also composed an entirely different singspiel version Die wüste Insel. The work was never performed during Beck's lifetime, and recorded for the first time only in 2021 with La Stagione Frankfurt.

== Plot ==
For people, Constanze, Droval, Laurette, and Sainville, find themselves stranded on an island. Constanze thinks that Dorval left her and her sister, Laurette, there because of someone else's intentions. Laurette, due to her young age, becomes greatly confused why Constanze doesn't have fond feelings for men. When a ship lands on the island, all is made well and a happy reunion is soon had.

== Recording ==
- L'Isle deserte (spoken dialogue omitted) Ana Maria Labin, Samantha Gaul, Theodore Browne, Fabian Kelly, La Stagione Frankfurt, Michael Schneider 1CD 2021
