= L'Orfeo Barockorchester =

Austrian early music orchestras

L'Orfeo Barockorchester is an Austrian Ensemble of historically informed performance.

== Presentation ==
The international baroque and opera orchestra, founded in 1996 by Michi Gaigg and Carin van Heerden at the Anton Bruckner Privatuniversität, has received several awards for first recordings. The repertoire, as can be seen from the discography, ranges from Suites of the French Baroque music through the Sinfonia of the Sturm und Drang to the literature of the Klassik and the Romantic music.

== Works ==
Most of the operas listed below were staged and performed during the Donaufestwochen:

- Georg Philipp Telemann: Miriways
- Wolfgang Amadeus Mozart: La Betulia liberata
- Christoph Willibald Gluck: Orfeo ed Euridice
- Gioachino Rossini: La cambiale di matrimonio
- Georg Philipp Telemann: Orpheus oder Die wunderbare Beständigkeit der Liebe
- Gioachino Rossini: La scala di seta
- Joseph Haydn: L'isola disabitata
- Joseph Haydn: L’incontro improvviso
- Gioachino Rossini: Il signor Bruschino
- Georg Anton Benda: Romeo und Julie
- Wolfgang Amadeus Mozart: Zaide
- Georg Philipp Telemann: Don Quichotte auf der Hochzeit des Comacho
- Ignaz Holzbauer: Il Figlio delle Selve (Der Sohn der Wildnis)

== Recordings ==
The discography for the period 1997 to 2012 comprises about 20 recordings of works by well-known composers of the genre.

- Georg Christoph Wagenseil: Sinfonien
- Benedikt Anton Aufschnaiter: Serenaden aus Concors discoria op. 2
- Ignaz Holzbauer: Sinfonien
- Johann Christian Bach: Geistliche Konzerte. With Emma Kirkby (soprano) and Markus Schäfer (tenor).
- Anton Fils: Sinfonien
- Wolfgang Amadeus Mozart: Konzertarien für Tenor. With Christoph Prégardien.
- Leopold Mozart: Sinfonien
- Georg Philipp Telemann: Sämtliche Violinkonzerte Vol. 1, 2 & 4. with Elizabeth Wallfisch.
- Josef Mysliveček: Sinfonien und Ouvertüren
- Ludwig van Beethoven: Mödlinger Tänze – Kontretänze – Deutsche Tänze – Menuette
- Johann Caspar Ferdinand Fischer: Le Journal du Printemps op. 1
- Jean-Féry Rebel, Les Éléments – Jean-Philippe Rameau: Suite aus Castor et Pollux
- Georg Philipp Telemann: 3 Orchestersuiten. With Carin van Heerden (Blockflöte und Leitung),
- Joseph Haydn: Arie per un'amante mit Nuria Rial and Margot Oitzinger. Deutsche Harmonia Mundi.
- Josef Myslivecek: Sämtliche Bläseroktette und -quintette
- Joseph Haydn: Die wüste Insel, Spätfassung der Azione teatrale L'isola disabitata. Deutsche Harmonia Mundi.
- Christoph Willibald Gluck: Sinfonien
- Jean-Philippe Rameau: Orchestersuiten aus Zaïs & Hippolyte et Aricie
- Georg Philipp Telemann: 3 Ouvertürensuiten für Violine solo und Orchester. With Elizabeth Wallfisch.
- Franz Schubert: Konzertouvertüren, Sinfonie Nr. 5
- Georg Philipp Telemann: Arien und weltliche Kantaten. Mit Dorothee Mields (Sopran).

== Awards ==
The orchestra can point to a number of awards:

- Diapason
- Pizzicato-Magazin (Supersonic Award)
- Le Monde de la Musique
- Fono Forum
- Radio Österreich 1 (Pasticcio-Preis)
- Deutsche Phonoakademie (Echo Klassik 2009)

== Stationen ==
- Festspielhaus Baden-Baden
- Palau de la Música Catalana
- Donaufestwochen in Grein
- Haydn Festspiele in Eisenstadt
- Innsbrucker Festwochen der Alten Musik
- Kölner Philharmonie
- Lucerne Festival
- Festspiele Europäische Wochen Passau
- Tage Alter Musik Regensburg
- Salzburger Festspiele
- Theater an der Wien

== See also ==
- L'arpa festante
- Michi Gaigg

== Media ==
- 20 Jahre L'Orfeo Barockorchester. In: Webpräsenz von ORF Radio Oberösterreich
