= Soraya Mafi =

British operatic soprano

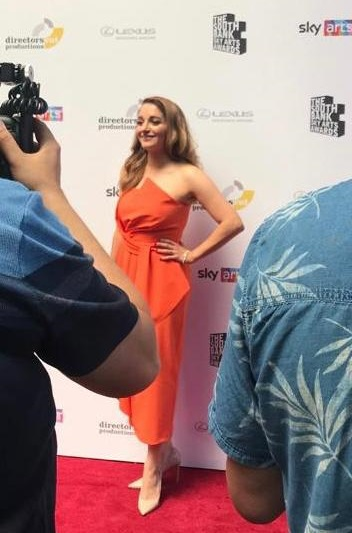
Mafi arriving at the Sky Arts Awards in 2022.

Soraya Mafi is an operatic soprano and recording artist who has sung leading roles in the opera houses and concert halls of Europe and North America. Mafi's performances have been broadcast live on radio, television, and in cinema. She has performed at international festivals and sports events and was nominated for Young Singer of the Year at the International Opera Awards in 2019. She is an inaugural Honorary Associate Artist of the Royal Northern College of Music.

== Life and career ==
Mafi was born in Bury, a town in Greater Manchester, and was educated at Bury Grammar School for Girls and Holy Cross College. She attended the Royal Northern College of Music where she studied singing under Sandra Dugdale, then the Royal College of Music under the tutelage of Janis Kelly. Upon choosing Mafi for their Rising Star – Great Artists of Tomorrow series, BBC Music Magazine published a feature interview that explored the challenges she faced as an undergraduate, undergoing surgery on her vocal cords, and her subsequent recovery with a vocal trauma specialist.

During her time as a student, Mafi received multiple awards, including The RCM Lieder Prize and The Elsie Thurston Prize. Notable performances include singing in England's two largest football stadiums, Old Trafford Stadium and Wembley Stadium. She sang the Brazilian and English national anthems at Wembley Stadium's inaugural match, England vs. Brazil, becoming the first woman to sing there. Still a student, Mafi made her professional début as Soeur Constance in Grange Park Opera's production of Dialogues des Carmélites to critics' approval in The Times, The Telegraph and The Sunday Times.

Graduating with distinction, Mafi was interviewed by Rupert Christiansen for his feature article New Face – Soraya Mafi in The Telegraph. She then won the Royal Overseas League Competition, The Maggie Teyte Award, The Peter Hulsen Orchestral Song Award, Second Prize at The Kathleen Ferrier Awards, Second Prize and Audience Prize at the International Mozart Singing Competition and the Chilcott Award.

Debuts in the UK and Europe followed: notable performances included performing solo recitals in Fauré's Requiem at the Royal Albert Hall, French song in The Crush Room at the Royal Opera House as well as Britten's Les Illuminations at The Royal Festival Hall and Karl Jenkins' The Armed Man at St David's Hall. She made her debut at Théâtre du Châtelet in Paris as the title role in Mozart's Il Re Pastore (Aminta). Broadcast live to cinemas in the UK, Ireland, and Germany, Mafi sang Edith in Mike Leigh's The Pirates of Penzance at the London Coliseum (English National Opera). With additional re-runs in the United States and Australia – it overtook Franz Lehár's The Merry Widow at Metropolitan Opera to become "the most lucrative opera to be screened in cinemas". Mafi made her Welsh National Opera debut as Johanna in Sweeney Todd at the Millennium Centre in Cardiff.

As a Harewood Artist, Mafi has sung numerous leading roles in productions for English National Opera (Mabel in Gilbert & Sullivan's Pirates of Penzance and Tytania in Britten's A Midsummer Night's Dream). In The Telegraph, Rupert Christiansen wrote of Mafi's Mabel performance: "her scintillating 'Poor Wand'ring One' was in the Valerie Masterson class". Of her Tytania Christiansen wrote: "Soraya Mafi continues to ride the upward trajectory of her career with a diamantine Tytania, scattering coloratura like stardust." (The Telegraph).

The critics at The Times chose Soraya Mafi as the opera 'Face to Watch' in The Arts Highlights of 2019. She made her Wigmore Hall solo recital debut with Graham Johnson. Undertaking her first opera in the United States, Mafi made her Seattle Opera debut as Flora in Britten's Turn of the Screw. Mafi played the title role in Grange Park Opera's five-star rated production (The Telegraph and The Evening Standard) of Humperdinck's Hansel & Gretel.

Returning to Washington, Mafi sang the role of Gilda in Rigoletto for Seattle Opera, which was recorded for broadcast on Classic King FM. Mafi played the title role in Menotti's two-person opera, The Telephone - a Scottish Opera film for Edinburgh International Festival. The production was awarded five-stars by The Scotsman, The Times and Bachtrack and was the opera pick of the week in The Times' 'The Hot List'. Broadcast live from Alexandra Palace on SkyArts, Mafi played Musetta in Puccini's La Bohème by English National Opera. Described as 'Europe's first drive-in opera', the production was nominated for a Royal Television Society Award (Best Live Event).

Notable roles in 2022 include: Susanna in Mozart's Marriage of Figaro at Seattle Opera; a guest artist appearance at Seattle Symphony's Stravinsky & Brahms Concerts at Benaroya Hall; Susanna in Mozart's Marriage of Figaro for Glyndebourne Touring Opera; and Morgana in Handel's Alcina at the Glyndebourne Festival.

== Discography ==
Mafi's recordings include:

- Mozart: Il sogno di Scipione – Stuart Jackson (Scipione), Soraya Mafi (Fortuna), Klara Ek (Costanza), Krystian Adam (Publio), Robert Murray (Emilio), Chiara Skerath (Licenza); The Choir and Orchestra of Classical Opera; Ian Page (conductor) [Recorded in the Church of St. Augustine, Kilburn, London, UK, October 2016]; 2 CDs. Released 2017. Signum Classics. SIGCD499
- Cellier & Gilbert: The Mountebanks – Soraya Mafi (Teresa), Thomas Elwin (Alfredo), BBC Concert Orchestra, BBC Singers, James Cleverton (Arrostino), Sharon Carty (Minestra), John-Colyn Gyeantey (Risotto), Catherine Carby (Nita), John Savournin (Bartolo), Geoffrey Dolton (Pietro), Madeleine Shaw (Ultrice), Martin Lamb (Elvino), John Andrews. Released 2018. Dutton. 2CDLX7349
- Decades: A Century of Song Vol. 3 1830-1840 – John Mark Ainsley (tenor), Lorna Anderson (soprano), Alexey Gusev (bass-baritone), Angelika Kirchschlager (mezzo), Soraya Mafi (soprano), Malcolm Martineau (piano). Released 2018. Label: Vivat. VIVAT116
- Debussy & Saint-Saëns: Ruhr Piano Festival Edition Vol. 37: Vive La France! Sergei Redkin, Jamina Gerl, Mao Fujita, Inga Fiolia, Juan Carlos Fernández-Nieto, Graham Johnson, Soraya Mafi, François le Roux, Sarah Fox, Victor Julien-Laffarière, Théo Fouchenneret, Mi-Sa Yang, delian quartett, Benjamin Moser, Liza Ferschtman (soloists). Released 2019. Label: Avi Music. AVI8553465
- Dibdin & Garrick: The Jubilee – Simon Butteriss (Artist), Stephen Higgins (Artist), Soraya Mafi (Artist), Heather Shipp (Artist), Robert Murray (Artist). Released 2019. Label: Retrospect Opera. RO006
- Menotti: The Telephone (Edinburgh International Festival) – Soraya Mafi (Lucy), Jonathan McGovern (Ben), The Orchestra of Scottish Opera, Stuart Stratford. Released 2020. Label: Linn Records. CKD670
- Strauss: Ariadne auf Naxos (Edinburgh International Festival) – Gantner, Röschmann, Gantner, Quasthoff, Huskinson, Manu, Morison, Redpath, Butt Philip, Barnett-Jones, McGovern, Sprague, Huskinson, Mafi, Hopkins, Brenda Rae, Manu, Dladla, Röschmann, Rea, Bronder (soloists), Royal Scottish National Orchestra, Lothar Koenigs. Released 2021. Label: Linn Records. CKD689
- Barber: The Complete Songs – Dylan Perez (piano), Samantha Clarke, Soraya Mafi, Louise Kemény, Mary Bevan (sopranos), Fleur Barron (mezzo), Jess Dandy (contralto), Nicky Spence (tenor), Dominic Sedgewick, Julien Van Mellaerts (baritones), William Thomas (bass), Navarra String Quartet. Released 2022. Resonus Classics. RES10301
