= Gaspard Fritz =

Genevan violinist and composer

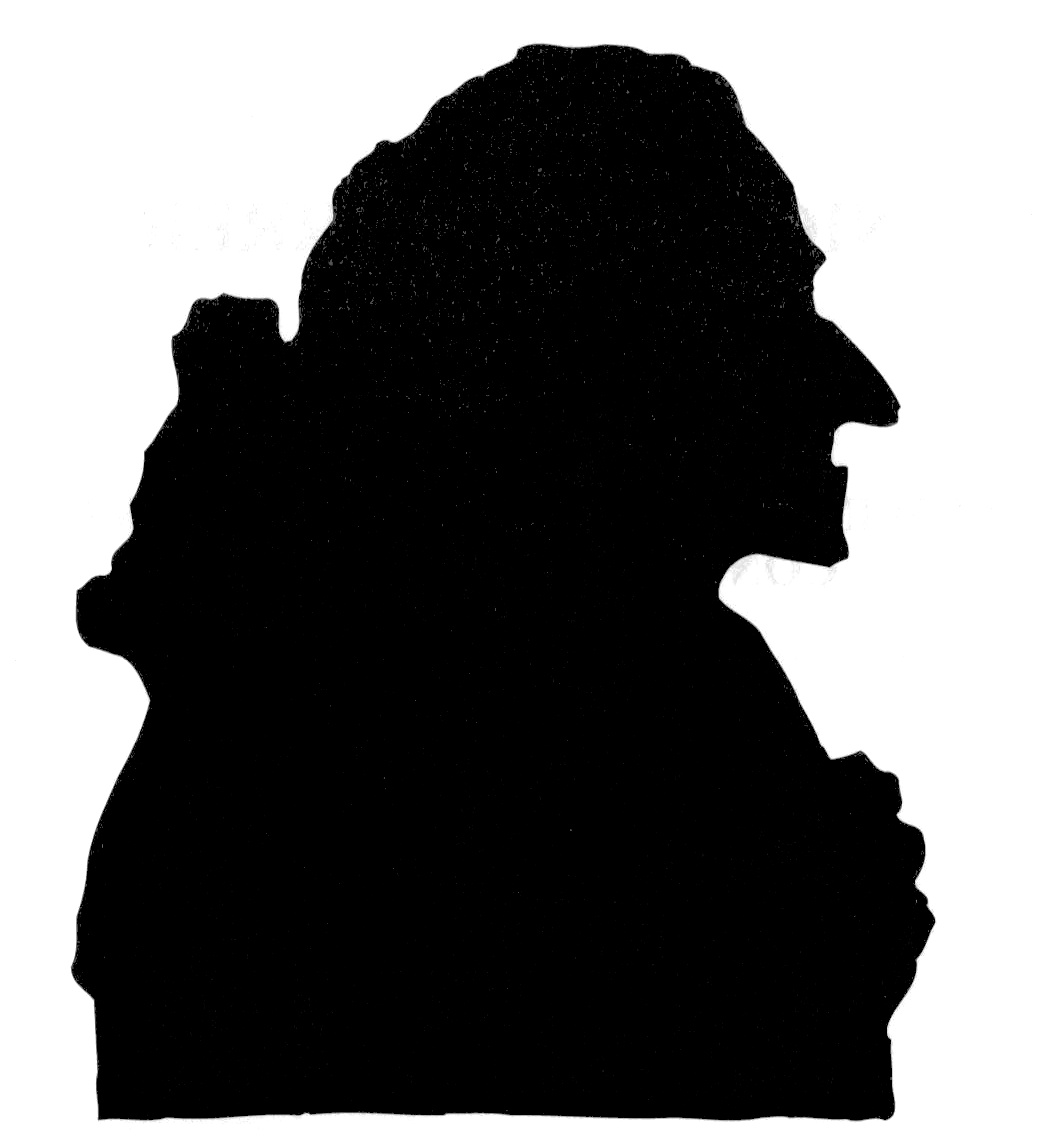
Cutout silhouette of Gaspard Fritz, attributed to Jean Huber, ca 1770

République de Genève

Gaspard Fritz (18 February 1716 – 23 March 1783) was a Genevan violinist and composer of the pre-classical period. He composed symphonies and chamber music.

== Life ==
Fritz was born in Geneva where his father had moved in 1709 where he "taught to play the violin and other musical instruments". In addition to the training undoubtedly followed with his father, the child continued his studies with Giovanni Battista Somis in Turin.

At the age of twenty, he returned to Geneva and married in April 1737. He only undertook a Parisian tour which turned out to be a failure (1756). In 1759, he played for Voltaire.

Fritz's fame outside Geneva is confirmed by correspondence and by the writings of Charles Burney (États de la musique en France et en Italie, London 1773) following his trip to Switzerland in 1770. It is known that Handel met the composer and that Locatelli loved the works of the Genevan.

Fritz, within a Calvinist society which did not promote the concert or secular opera, found in the common rooms, "The Common Room of Geneva", societies which brought together the community of English origin in Geneva by special authorisation as early as 1738, a space for private expression where instrumental and lyrical music was produced and appreciated.

There is little music to be heard here : The theatre is not allowed here, nor are organs in churches, except for two which are only used for psalmody in the pure style of John Calvin; however Mr. Fritz, a good composer and excellent violin player is still alive; he has lived here for nearly thirty years and is well known to all English music lovers who have visited Geneva during this period..

— Charles Burney, États de la musique... 1773.

Around 1737 until his death at the age of 67 in Geneva, he worked as a violinist and taught the instrument and music.

Between 1742 and 1772, Fritz's success is confirmed by the publication of six opuses in Paris and London, reprints as well as counterfeit editions.

== Compositions ==
- Concerto a 5, violino principale, 2 violini, alto, basso (ca. 1740)
- Sei sonate a quatro stromenti, opus 1 (pub. Walsh, London 1741)
1. - in C major
2. - in Bb major
3. - in A major
4. - in G major
5. in F major
6. in A major
- VI Sonata a violino o flauto traverso solo col basso, opus 2
1. in C major - Allegro, Largo, Vivace
2. in D major - Adagio, Allegro, Aria
3. in A major - Largo, Vivace, Largo, Presto
4. in E minor - Andante, Allegro, Grazioso
5. in D major - Andante, Allegro, Vivace
6. in G major - Andante, Allegro, Minuetto
- Sei sonate a violino solo e basso, opus 3 (ca.1755)
- Sei sonate a due violini e basso, opus 4
- Sei sinfonie a piu strumenti, opus 6 (ca. 1770)
1. -
2. -
3. In G major
4. -
5. in F major
6. in G minor
- Symphonie N° 1 (Hermann Scherchen publisher, 1940)
- Harpsichord Concerto (pub. Feuille d'Avis de Genève 1774)
- Violin Concerto in E major (manuscript)
1. Allegro
2. Adagio
3. Allegro

== Modern editions ==
- Gaspard Fritz, Œuvres complètes. Xavier Bouvier (ed.) and Anna Jelmorini and Pascale Darmsteter, series "Musiques à Genève", Université-Conservatoire de musique, 1994– OCLC 870291520, 163303827

== Recordings ==
- Sonates pour flûte, opus 2 - Claire Genewein, flute; Nicoleta Paraschivescu, harpsichord; Maya Amrein, violoncello continuo (2008, Guild 1834706)
- Sonates pour violon, opus 3 - Plamena Nikitassova, violin; Jörg-Andreas Bötticher, harpsichord; Maya Amrein, violoncello (2013, Pan Classics PC10295)
- Concerto pour violon; Symphonie n°1 - Jens Lohmann, violin; English Chamber Orchestra, dir. Howard Griffiths (1993, Novalis 150 099-2)
- Sinfonias - La Stagione Frankfurt, dir. Michael Schneider (March 2011, CPO 777 696-2)

== Bibliography ==
- Horneffer, Jacques (1984). "Gaspard Fritz (1716–1783) : ses amis anglais, le Dr. Burney, le concerto de violon". Revue musicale de Suisse romande (in French). Vol. 37, no. 3 and 4. Paris. pp. 120–129, 178–188. OCLC 716037256.
- Stenzl, Jürg (2001). "Fritz, Gaspard". In Sadie, Stanley (ed.). The New Grove Dictionary of Music and Musicians. Vol. 29. London: Macmillan. doi:10.1093/gmo/9781561592630.article.10292. ISBN 9780195170672.
