= Sabine Bauer =

German woman harpsichordist

Sabine Bauer is a German harpsichordist, pianofortiste and flautist specialising in the repertoire of Baroque music and classical period, adept at historically informed performance, i.e. performance on ancient instruments (or copies of ancient instruments).

== Formation ==
Bauer studied the flute at the conservatories of Cologne, Berlin and Frankfurt with Michael Schneider, and the harpsichord with Bradford Tracey and Harald Hoeren.

She then continued her studies with Andreas Staier, Ton Koopman and Gustav Leonhardt.

== Career ==
In 1979, Bauer was one of the founding members of the ensemble Camerata Köln, together with Michael Schneider (flute), Ingeborg Scheerer (violin), Sabine Lier (violin) and Rainer Zipperling (cello and viola da gamba).

She then joined the ensemble La Stagione Frankfurt founded by Michael Schneider.

In addition to her activity as harpsichordist in these two ensembles, she regularly accompanies singers and instrumentalists in chamber music works and has also performed and recorded with the Musica Antiqua Köln ensemble.

Since 1986, Bauer has been a lecturer at the Frankfurt University of Music and Performing Arts and teaches harpsichord, basso continuo and chamber music at the Academy of Music in Darmstadt.

== Repertoire ==
With Michael Schneider and his ensemble La Stagione Frankfurt, whose slogan is Unerhörtes hörbar machen ('Make the unheard heard'), Bauer is committed to making little-known composers representative of the École préclassique de Vienne heard. (Georg Matthias Monn), from the Berlin School, (Jiří Antonín Benda) and the gallant style, (Karl Friedrich Abel) whose harpsichord concertos she has recorded.

She has also worked the classical and romantic Lied repertoire by accompanying the bass-baritone Gotthold Schwarz on harpsichord and fortepiano.

== Recordings ==
- 1994: Goldberg Variations by Johann Sebastian Bach. (Ars Musici)
- 1995: Deutsche und niederländische Blockflötenmusik des 18. Jahrhundert with Michael Schneider and Annette Schneider
- 1996: Concerti by Georg Matthias Monn, with La Stagione Frankfurt, cellist Rainer Zipperling and violinist Mary Utiger
- 1997: Englische und Italienische Blockflötenmusik des 17.&18. Jahrhunderts, with Michael Schneider, Rainer Zipperling and Yasunori Imamura
- 2003: Concerto for harpsichord op.11 No. 1-6 by Karl Friedrich Abel, with La Stagione Frankfurt
- 2004: Concertos for harpsichord by Jiří Antonín Benda, with La Stagione Frankfurt
- Bach in Cembalo e Viola da Gamba, with Rainer Zipperling on the viola da gamba
