= Franz Beck =

Franz Beck may refer to:

- Franz Beck (skier), Liechtensteiner alpine skier
- Franz Ignaz Beck, German violinist, composer, conductor and music teacher
