= Josef Starzer =

Austrian composer

Joseph Johann Michael Starzer (1726 – 22 April 1787) was an Austrian composer and violinist of the pre-classical period. He was active in Moscow, Saint Petersburg, and Vienna.

Starzer contributed to the formation of the Vienna Tonkünstler-Societät in 1771. With Georg Christoph Wagenseil and Georg Matthias Monn he was a precursor of the First Viennese School. Starzer composed numerous symphonies, concerts, the Singspiel Die drei Pächter, and other orchestral works and chamber music. He is credited with dozens of ballet, although the music of many has since been lost.

On June 24, 1773, premiered in Burgtheater his ballet in five acts Adèle de Ponthieu, choreography by Jean-Georges Noverre.
