= La Stagione Frankfurt =

German baroque and classical music ensemble

La Stagione Frankfurt is a German ensemble of Baroque and classical music, adept at historically informed performance.

== History ==
The ensemble La Stagione Frankfurt was founded in 1988 by the German flautist and conductor Michael Schneider around the members of the ensemble Camerata Köln.

Schneider began his career as a solo flutist by winning a prize at the 1978 ARD International Competition in Munich. In 1979, he was one of the founding members of the chamber music ensemble Camerata Köln.

In 1988, he founded the ensemble La Stagione Frankfurt with which he recorded more than 100 discs in the genres of opera, oratorio and symphony, in the spirit of historically informed interpretation, i.e. on period instruments (or copies of period instruments).

The ensemble calls itself "Die Klang-Gourmets", i.e. "The gourmets of sound"..

The Stagione Frankfurt is supported by the Ministry of Culture and Science of the State of Hesse.

== Repertoire ==
An important aspect of the work of the ensemble La Stagione Frankfurt, whose motto is "Unerhörtes hörbar machen" (and "Bringing the undiscovered to your ears"), is the rediscovery of little-known works.

Michael Schneider and his ensemble are therefore committed to the performance of little-known composers representative of the École préclassique de Vienne (Georg Matthias Monn), the Berlin School (Georg Anton Benda), the Mannheim school (Ignaz Holzbauer), the style galant (Karl Friedrich Abel) and sentimentalism (Joseph Martin Kraus), without neglecting Geminiani, Gluck, Hasse, Telemann, Scarlatti or Stradella.

== Collaborations ==
La Stagione works with many soloists such as Claron McFadden, Christoph Prégardien and his son Julian, Gotthold Schwarz, Simone Kermes, Nuria Rial, Emma Kirkby, Barbara Schlick, Sandrine Piau and Klaus Mertens.

== Critical reception ==
For the Early Music Review

La Stagione is a very impressive period-instrument-group. Their control of dynamics, phrasing and their sense of style are compelling. [...] Very impressing all round.

For the Bach Cantatas website, Michael Schneider's versatility on the one hand, and the musicians' artistic flexibility on the other, allow a convincing and authentic performance of a wide range of works from the baroque to the classical symphonies and the contemporary repertoire.

== Recordings ==
La Stagione Frankfurt has made numerous recordings for the following labels cpo, Cappriccio, Deutsche Harmonia Mundi and Koch-Classics:

- 1991: La Colpa, Il Pentimento, la Grazia by Alessandro Scarlatti (Capriccio)
- 1992: Paride et Elena by Christoph Willibald Gluck, with soprano Claron McFadden
- 1993: Symphonies op.10 No. 1-6 by Karl Friedrich Abel
- 1993: 4 Flute concertos by Karl Friedrich Abel
- 1993: Piramo e Tisbe by Johann Adolph Hasse, with soprano Barbara Schlick
- 1995: Günther von Schwarzburg by Ignaz Holzbauer
- 1996: Concerti by Georg Matthias Monn, with cellist Rainer Zipperling, harpsichordist Sabine Bauer and violinist Mary Utiger
- 1996: 9 Symphonies by Franz Ignaz Beck
- 2001: Stabat Mater by Franz Beck, with Sandrine Piau, Klaus Mertens and the Vokalensemble of the SWR
- 2003: Klavierkonzerte op.11 Nr.1-6, concertos for harpsichord and fortepiano by Karl Friedrich Abel, with Sabine Bauer
- 2004: Harpsichord Concertos by Jiří Antonín Benda (Georg Anton Benda), with Sabine Bauer
- 2008: Miserere / Requiem / Stella coeli by Joseph Martin Kraus with the Deutscher Kammerchor.
- 2009: Flute Concertos by Ignaz Holzbauer
- 2011: 5 Sinfonias by Gaspard Fritz
- 2015: Symphonies op.7 by Karl Friedrich Abel
