= Sophie Karthäuser =

21st-century Belgian operatic soprano

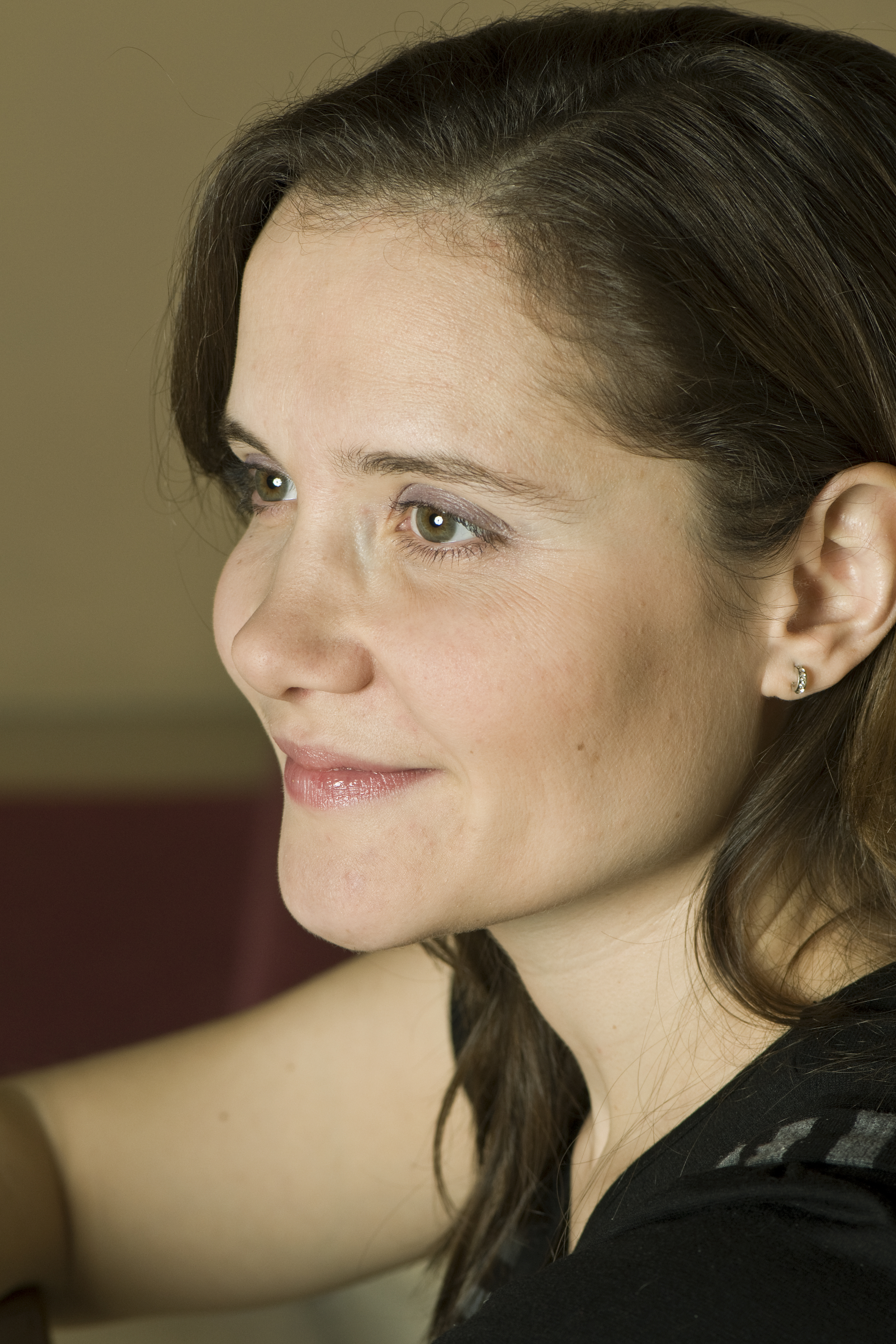
- Karthäuser in 2008
- Born: May 1974 (age 51); Malmedy, Belgium
- Education: Royal Conservatory of Liège; Guildhall School of Music and Drama
- Occupation: Operatic soprano

Sophie Karthäuser (born May 1974) is a Belgian operatic soprano. She has performed internationally, especially in roles by Mozart such as Ilia in Idomeneo and Pamina in The Magic Flute. She is also a recitalist, performing and recording for example the complete songs by Mozart and lieder by Hugo Wolf.

== Early life ==
Born in Malmedy, her musical training began in her village of Bellevaux-Ligneuville, where she learned the clarinet at the local academy and was a member of the church choir. At the age of 16, she decided to take singing lessons at the regional academy. In 1992, at the age of 18, she entered the Royal Conservatory of Liège, studying with Greta de Reyghere and Thierry Migliorini. Winner of the Fondation belge de la vocation in 1997, she continued her studies at the Guildhall School of Music and Drama in London with Noelle Barker. She participated in some masterclasses and took private lessons, notably with Elisabeth Schwarzkopf.

== Debut ==
Karthäuser made her stage debut as Papagena in Mozart's Die Zauberflöte at the Frankfurt Opera. She was soon noticed by three important institutions in Belgium: the Stavelot festival, the Orchestre Philharmonique de Liège and La Monnaie. Stavelot invited her almost every year between 1997 and 2005, with the Orchestre Philharmonique de Liège she sang the first soprano part in Mozart's Great Mass in C minor alongside Louis Langrée, also in Britten's Les Illuminations with Armin Jordan and the cycle Les Nuits d'été by Berlioz with Stéphane Denève. She joined the opera studio of La Monnaie where she appeared as Despina in Mozart's Così fan tutte, as Euridice and La Ninfa in Monterverdi's L'Orfeo, Eritea in Cavalli's Eliogabalo, Hanako in Hanjo by Toshio Hosokawa and Zerlina in Mozart's Don Giovanni.

== Roles ==
In 2005, she first appeared as Pamina in Die Zauberflöte at La Monnaie, conducted by René Jacobs. In Le Monde, the journalist Marie-Aude Roux noted that she was "the queen of the evening". She then performed in other Mozart operas, playing Susanna in Le nozze di Figaro in May 2007 at the Opéra de Lyon, conducted by William Christie, and Ilia in Idomeneo first at the Opéra national du Rhin in Strasbourg. The critic André Tubeuf wrote in Classica that "a great singer is hatching before our eyes". At the Théâtre des Champs-Élysées, she appeared as Tamiri in Mozart's Il re pastore, and in Berlin, she was Serpetta in his La finta giardiniera.

In 2011, she performed the role of Agathe in Weber's Der Freischütz at the Opéra-Comique in Paris. She appeared at Lincoln Center in New York in 2016 as Ilia, conducted by Jacobs.

== Recordings ==
- Opera arias by André Grétry, Les Agrémens & Guy Van Waas
- Boccherini's Stabat Mater, Les Folies Françoises & Patrick Cohën-Akenine
- Haydn's Il ritorno di Tobia, Cappella Coloniensis, Naxos Records
- Haydn's Die Schöpfung, Les Arts florissants & William Christie, Virgin Classics
- Complete set of songs for soprano and piano by Mozart, Cypres records
- Handel's Faramondo, I barochisti & Diego Fasolis, Virgin Classics
- Mozart arias, live at La Monnaie, Cypres records
- Mozart's La Finta Giardiniera, Freiburger Barockorchester & René Jacobs, Harmonia Mundi (2012)
- "Les Anges Musiciens" chosen mélodies by Francis Poulenc, with Eugène Asti (piano), Harmonia Mundi (2014)
- Handel's Orlando, B'Rock Orchestra & René Jacobs, Archiv (2014)
- Michel-Richard de Lalande's Leçons de ténèbres, Ensemble Correspondances, conducted by Sébastien Daucé, Harmonia Mundi (2015)
- Hugo Wolf's Kennst du das Land?, with pianist Eugene Asti (2015)
- Bach's Dialogkantaten with Michael Volle, RIAS Kammerchor, Akademie für Alte Musik Berlin & Raphael Alpermann (2017)
- Berlioz's Béatrice et Bénédict, Stéphanie d'Oustrac (Béatrice), Paul Appleby (Bénédict), Sophie Karthäuser (Héro), Lionel Lothe (Somarone), Philippe Sly (Claudio), Frédéric Caton (Don Pedro), Katarina Bradić (Ursule), London Philharmonic Orchestra, The Glyndebourne Chorus, staged by Laurent Pelly, conducted by Antonello Manacorda. 1 DVD Opus Arte 2017
- Telemann's Miriways,Akademie für Alte Musik Berlin & Bernard Labadie (2020)
