= Betulia liberata =

1771 oratorio by W. A. Mozart

La Betulia liberata (The Liberation of Bethulia) is a libretto by Pietro Metastasio which was originally commissioned by Emperor Charles VI and set to music by Georg Reutter the Younger in 1734. It was subsequently set by as many as 30 composers, including Niccolò Jommelli (1743), Ignaz Holzbauer (1752), Florian Leopold Gassmann (1772), Joseph Schuster (1787), and most famously Wolfgang Amadeus Mozart (1771).

== Mozart's setting ==
La Betulia liberata
- Azione sacra by W. A. Mozart
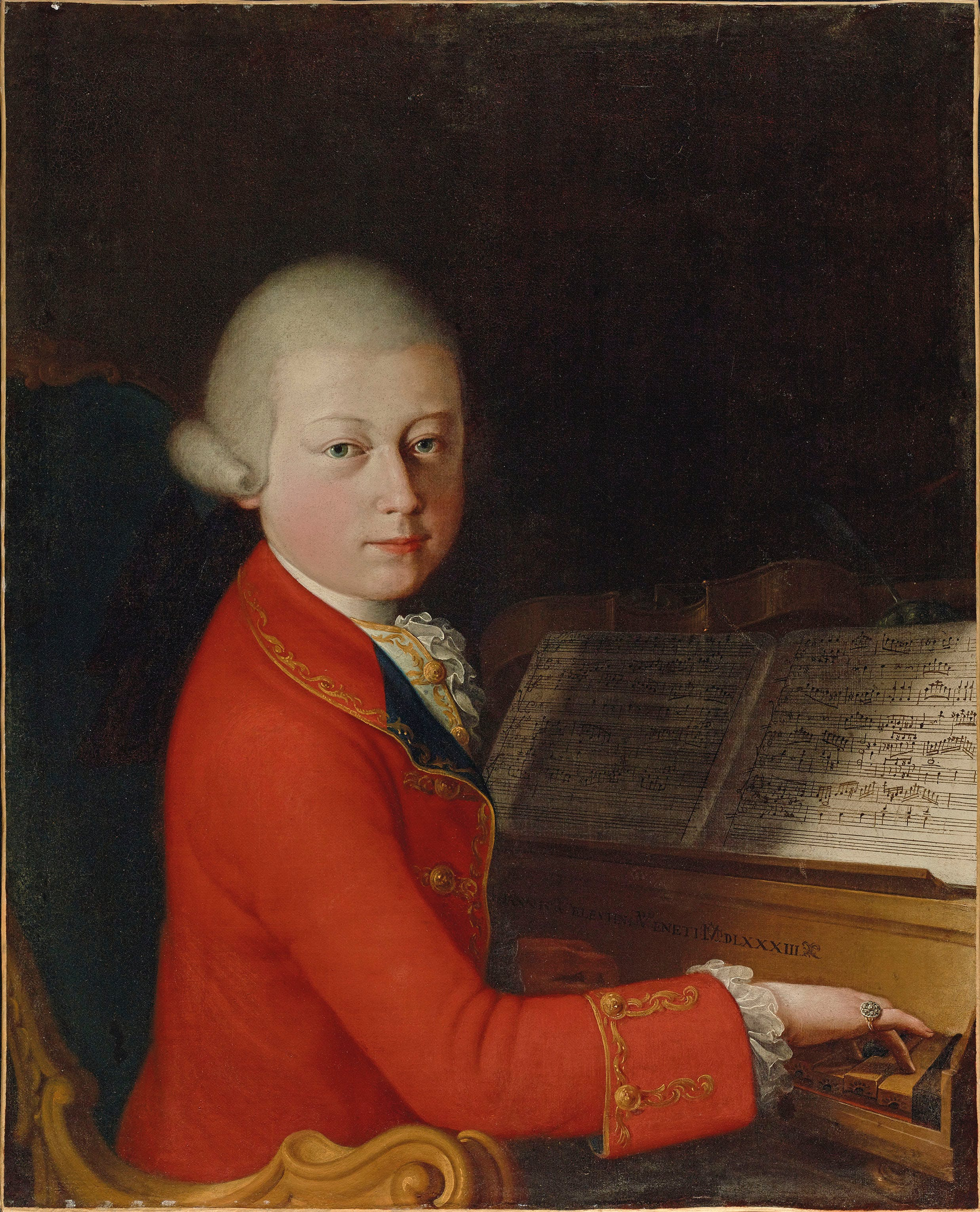
- 1770 Verona portrait of Mozart
- Translation: The Liberation of Bethulia
- Librettist: Pietro Metastasio
- Language: Italian
- Based on: Judith and Holofernes

The setting of Mozart, K. 118 (74c), is the best known, if only because the composer's output receives more examination. Composed in March to July 1771 when Mozart was fifteen, it is a 140-minute azione sacra on a text by Metastasio tracing the story of Judith beheading Holofernes from the biblical Book of Judith. It was commissioned in March 1771 by Giuseppe Ximenes, Prince of Aragon, while Mozart and his father Leopold were on the way home to Salzburg from their first journey to Italy. It is the only oratorio Mozart ever wrote. Its two parts comprise sixteen arias, with solo or choral parts, scored for soloists, choir and orchestra. Not performed in Mozart's lifetime, Betulia liberata is shaped stylistically to works by Leonardo Leo and Johann Adolph Hasse.

Performances of Mozart's setting include one at the 2006 Salzburg Festival conducted by Christoph Poppen. The performance was recorded and subsequently released as DVD. (See Poppen (2006) in "Recordings" below.) In 2010 both the Mozart and the Jommelli settings were performed side by side at the Salzburg Whitsun and Ravenna festivals conducted by Riccardo Muti.

The score published by Breitkopf & Härtel

=== Roles ===
- Ozia, prince of Bethulia (tenor)
- Giuditta, widow of Manasses (alto)
- Amital, noblewoman of Israel (soprano)
- Achior, prince of the Ammonites (bass)
- Cabri and Carmi, chiefs of the people (sopranos)
- Bethulians (chorus)

=== Orchestration ===
The orchestra for the oratorio calls for two oboes, two bassoons, four horns, two trumpets in D, strings, and basso continuo.

=== Structure ===
First part

1. Overtura
2. Recitative: Popoli di Betulia (Ozia)
3. Aria #1: D'ogni colpa la colpa maggiore (Ozia)
4. Recitative: E in che sperar? (Cabri, Amital)
5. Aria #2: Ma qual virtù non cede (Cabri)
6. Recitative: Già le memorie antiche (Ozia, Cabri, Amital)
7. Aria #3: Non hai cor (Amital)
8. Recitative: E qual pace sperate (Ozia, Amital, chorus)
9. Aria with chorus #4: Pietà, se irato sei (Ozia, chorus)
10. Recitative: Chi è costei che qual sorgente aurora (Cabri, Amital, Ozia, Giuditta)
11. Aria #5: Del pari infeconda (Giuditta)
12. Recitative: Oh saggia, oh santa (Ozia, Cabri, Giuditta)
13. Aria with chorus #6: Pietà, se irato sei (Ozia, chorus)
14. Recitative: Signor, Carmi a te viene (Cabri, Amital, Carmi, Ozia, Achior)
15. Aria #7: Terribile d'aspetto (Achior)
16. Recitative: Ti consola, Achior (Ozia, Cabri, Achior, Giuditta)
17. Aria #8: Parto inerme, e non pavento (Giuditta)
18. Chorus #9: Oh prodigio! Oh stupor! (Chorus)

Second part

1. Recitative: Troppo mal corrisponde (Achior, Ozia)
2. Aria #10: Se Dio veder tu vuoi (Ozia)
3. Recitative: Confuso io son (Achior, Ozia, Amital)
4. Aria #11: Quel nocchier che in gran procella (Amital)
5. Recitative: Lungamente non dura (Ozia, Amital, chorus, Cabri, Giuditta, Achior)
6. Aria #12: Prigionier che fa ritorno (Giuditta)
7. Recitative: Giuditta, Ozia, popoli, amici (Achior)
8. Aria #13: Te solo adoro (Achior)
9. Recitative: Di tua vittoria (Ozia, Amital)
10. Aria #14: Con troppa rea viltà (Amital)
11. Recitative: Quanta cura hai di noi (Cabri, Carmi, Ozia, Amital)
12. Aria #15: Quei moti che senti (Carmi)
13. Recitative: Seguansi, o Carmi (Ozia, Amital, Cabri, Achior, Giuditta)
14. Aria with chorus #16: Lodi al gran Dio (Giuditta, chorus)

== Recordings ==
- 1952 – Elisabeth Schwarzkopf (Amital), Miriam Pirazzini (Giuditta), Cesare Valletti (Ozia), Boris Christoff (Achior), Luigia Vincenti (Cabri/Carmi) – Orchestra e Coro di Torino della RAI, Mario Rossi – CD Opera d'Oro (radio broadcast from Turin on 30 May 1952).
- 1977 – Kari Lövaas (Amital), Birgit Finnilä (Giuditta), Claes-Håkan Ahnsjö (Ozia), Siegfried Vogel (Achior), Kate Gamberucci (Cabri), Ursula Reinhardt-Kiss (Carmi) – Berlin Radio Choir, Kammerorchester Berlin, Vittorio Negri – 3 LPs Philips Records (first complete recording).
- 1979 – Ileana Cotrubaș (Amital), Hanna Schwarz (Giuditta), Peter Schreier (Ozia), Walter Berry (Achior), Gabriele Fuchs (Cabri), Margarita Zimmermann (Carmi) – Salzburger Kammerchor, Mozarteum-Orchester Salzburg, Leopold Hager – 3 LPs Deutsche Grammophon (later reissued in 1991 as part of Volume 22 of The Complete Mozart Edition).
- 1991 – Lynda Russell (Amital), Gloria Banditelli (Giuditta), Ernesto Palacio (Ozia), Petteri Salomaa (Achior), Caterina Trogu Röhrich (Cabri), Sabina Macculi (Carmi) – Coro del Centro di Musica Antica di Padova, Padua Chamber Orchestra, Peter Maag – 2 CDs Denon Records (later reissued as part of Brilliant Classics' Mozart Complete Works series).
- 2006 – Julia Kleiter (Amital), Marijana Mijanovic (Giuditta), Jeremy Ovenden (Ozia), Franz-Josef Selig (Achior), Irena Bespalovaite (Cabri), Jennifer Johnston (Carmi) – Konzertvereinigung Wiener Staatsopernchor, Munich Chamber Orchestra, Christoph Poppen – 2 DVDs Deutsche Grammophon (part of Deutsche Grammophon's project to record all of Mozart's existing operatic output from the Salzburg Festival, titled M22, reflecting the 22 works recorded).
- 2013 – Marelize Gerber (Amital), Margot Oitzinger (Giuditta), Christian Zenker (Ozia), Markus Volpert (Achior), Ulrike Hofbauer (Cabri), Barbara Kraus (Carmi) – L'Orfeo Barockorchester, Michi Gaigg – 2 SACDs Challenge Classics.
- 2020 – Sandrine Piau (Amital), Teresa Iervolino (Giuditta), Pablo Bemsch (Ozia), Nahuel Di Pierro (Achior), Amanda Forsythe (Cabri/Carmi) – Chœur de Chambre Accentus, Les Talens Lyriques, Christophe Rousset – 2 CDs Aparté.

== Settings by other composers ==
Antonio Salieri in 1820 revised Florian Leopold Gassmann's La Betulia liberata by shortening some recitatives and arias, and adding additional choirs taken from Gassmann's other compositions.

As a student of Antonio Salieri, Franz Schubert set "Te solo adoro", Anchior's aria from the second part, as a composition exercise for four voices in November 1812. The exercise was first published in 1940, and, catalogued as D. 34, again in the New Schubert Edition in 1986.
