= Noelle Barker =

English soprano singer and singing teacher

Noelle Barker OBE (28 December 1928 – 15 May 2013) was an English soprano singer and singing teacher. She was considered one of the most outstanding singing teachers of her generation. She taught at the Guildhall School of Music and Drama. Among her students was the soprano Sophie Karthäuser.
