= Miriways =

- Opera by Georg Philipp Telemann
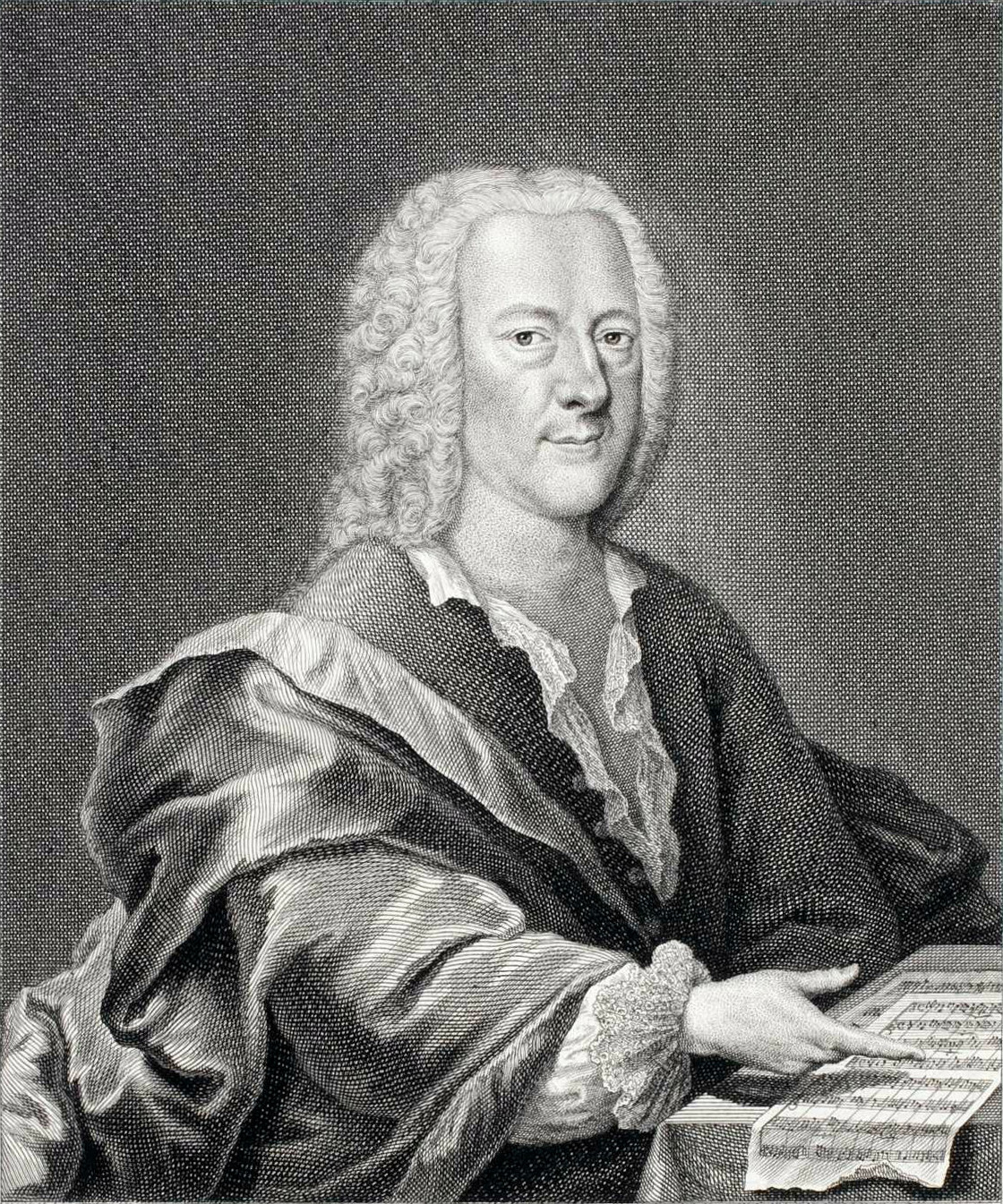
- The composer, c. 1745
- Librettist: Johann Samuel Müller
- Language: German
- Premiere: 1728; Oper am Gänsemarkt, Hamburg

Miriways (TWV 21:24) is an opera in three acts by Telemann given on 26 May 1728 at the Oper am Gänsemarkt in Hamburg. The libretto is by Johann Samuel Müller. The opera is set in Persia.

Müller took his plot from then current news from the Islamic world – in the form of an inaccurate account of "Miri-Ways", the Pashtun emir Mirwais (1673–1715), published anonymously in German in 1722. The account attributed to Mirwais events, such as the conquering of Isfahan, which were actually the work of his son. Nevertheless, Mir Wais became Miriways, titular king of the opera.

== Recordings ==
- With Markus Volpert, Ulrike Hofbauer. L'Orfeo Barockorchester. Michi Gaigg, cpo. 2013
- With André Morsch, Sophie Karthäuser, Akademie für Alte Musik Berlin, conducted by Bernard Labadie. Pentatone Cat:PTC5186842 2020
