= L'isola disabitata =

Opera by Joseph Haydn

- azione teatrale by Joseph Haydn
- Portrait by Thomas Hardy (1791)
- Translation: The desert island
- Librettist: Metastasio
- Language: Italian
- Based on: L'infedeltà fedele by Giovanni Battista Lorenzi
- Premiere: 6 December 1779; Eszterháza

L'isola disabitata (English: The Uninhabited Island), Hob. 28/9, is an opera (azione teatrale in due parti) by Joseph Haydn, his tenth opera, written for the Eszterházy court and premiered on 6 December 1779. The libretto is the only one by Metastasio set by Haydn.

The libretto had been originally set by Giuseppe Bonno (1754, Vienna) and subsequently used by Manuel García. Nino Rota has set excerpts to music as well. The libretto was adapted into French and set by F. I. Beck in Bordeaux in the same year as Haydn as L'isle déserte. A later German version was as a Singspiel Die wüste Insel (Hob. XXVIII:9).

Haydn's work has long been remembered for its dramatic Sturm und Drang overture, but the rest of the opera did not see print until H. C. Robbins Landon's 1976 edition (only available for rental). A new edition by Thomas J Busse was prepared in 2007 and is now online. The piece is striking for its use of orchestral recitativo accompagnato throughout.

Unrelated to Metastasio there is also a libretto of the same title by Carlo Goldoni (using the pen name Polisseno Fegeio), set by Giuseppe Scarlatti in 1757; it concerns a Chinese woman and Dutch sailors and was revived in 1760 (and again in Vienna in 1773) under the title La cinese smarrita.

== Roles ==
Role	Voice type	Premiere cast, 6 December 1779 (Conductor: Joseph Haydn)
Costanza	mezzo-soprano	Barbara Ripamonti
Enrico	baritone	Benedetto Bianchi
Gernando	tenor	Andrea Totti
Silvia	soprano	Luigia Polzelli

== Synopsis ==
=== Act 1 ===
Using the crudest of tools, Costanza is on the verge of completing an inscription on a rock next to her cave: "Abandoned by the traitor Gernando, Constanza finished her days on these strange shores. Friendly traveler, unless you be a tiger, either avenge or pity…" Her young sister Silvia enters, rejoicing that a lost pet deer has returned, and asks why Costanza is unhappy, being on such a pleasant island far from the world wicked men she has often described, but cannot cheer her. Silvia, alone, watches a ship arrive and runs to ask her sister what monster swims and flies at the same time. Her way is blocked by Gernando and his friend Enrico, and she hides, not being able to overhear their conversation. Both had been captives of pirates, Gernando seized on this very beach while his wife was recovering from seasickness. They split up to search the island, Enrico first singing of his unending gratitude to his friend for helping his escape. Silvia has managed to get a good look at him, too kind-looking to be a man, but not wearing a skirt either. She marvels as well at a new kind of fear that causes gladness: yet more questions for Constanza.

=== Act 2 ===
Gernando discovers the inscription and believes Constanza dead. He declares his intention to end his days on the island to Enrico; the latter decides he must be carried off by force for his own good, and instructs two sailors to lay an ambush by a stream. He comes upon Silvia who, learning he is a man after all, pleads for her life, but he wins her trust and they part to fetch the other couple. Silvia remains long enough to sing an aria putting a name to her new emotion. When she leaves, Constanza arrives, singing of the slowness of time. When Gernando appears she faints and he hurries to fetch water from the stream. Enrico enters and explains all to her; Silvia arrives with Gernando, having explained everything to the sailors after they had seized him. Enrico proposes to Silvia and the work closes with a quartet-rondo with concertante writing for solo violin and cello.

== Recordings ==
- 1978 – Norma Lerer (Costanza), Linda Zoghby (Silvia), Luigi Alva (Gernando), Renato Bruson (Enrico) – Orchestre de Chambre de Lausanne, Antal Doráti – 2 CDs (Philips Records). Recorded as part of the Haydn Eszterháza Opera Cycle on Philips.
- 1998 – Susanne Mentzer (Costanza), Ying Huang (Silvia), John Aler (Gernando), Christopher Schaldenbrand (Enrico), Padova Chamber Orchestra, David Golub – 2 CDs (Arabesque Records)
- 2009 – Ulrike Hofbauer (Costanza), Barbara Kraus (Silvia), Christian Zenker (Gernando), Reinhard Mayr (Enrico) – L'Orfeo Barockorchester, Michi Gaigg – 2 CDs (Deutsche Harmonia Mundi)
- 2012 – Katharina Kammerloher (Costanza), Anke Herrmann (Silvia), Robert Lee (Gernando), Furio Zanasi (Enrico) – Academia Montis Regalis, Alessandro De Marchi – 2 CDs (Naïve Classique)
- 2020 – Anett Fritsch (Costanza), Sunhae Im (Silvia), Krystian Adam (Gernando), André Morsch (Enrico) – Akademie für Alte Musik Berlin, Bernhard Forck – 2 CDs (Pentatone)
