= Il sogno di Scipione =

1772 opera by Wolfgang Amadeus Mozart

- Azione teatrale by W. A. Mozart
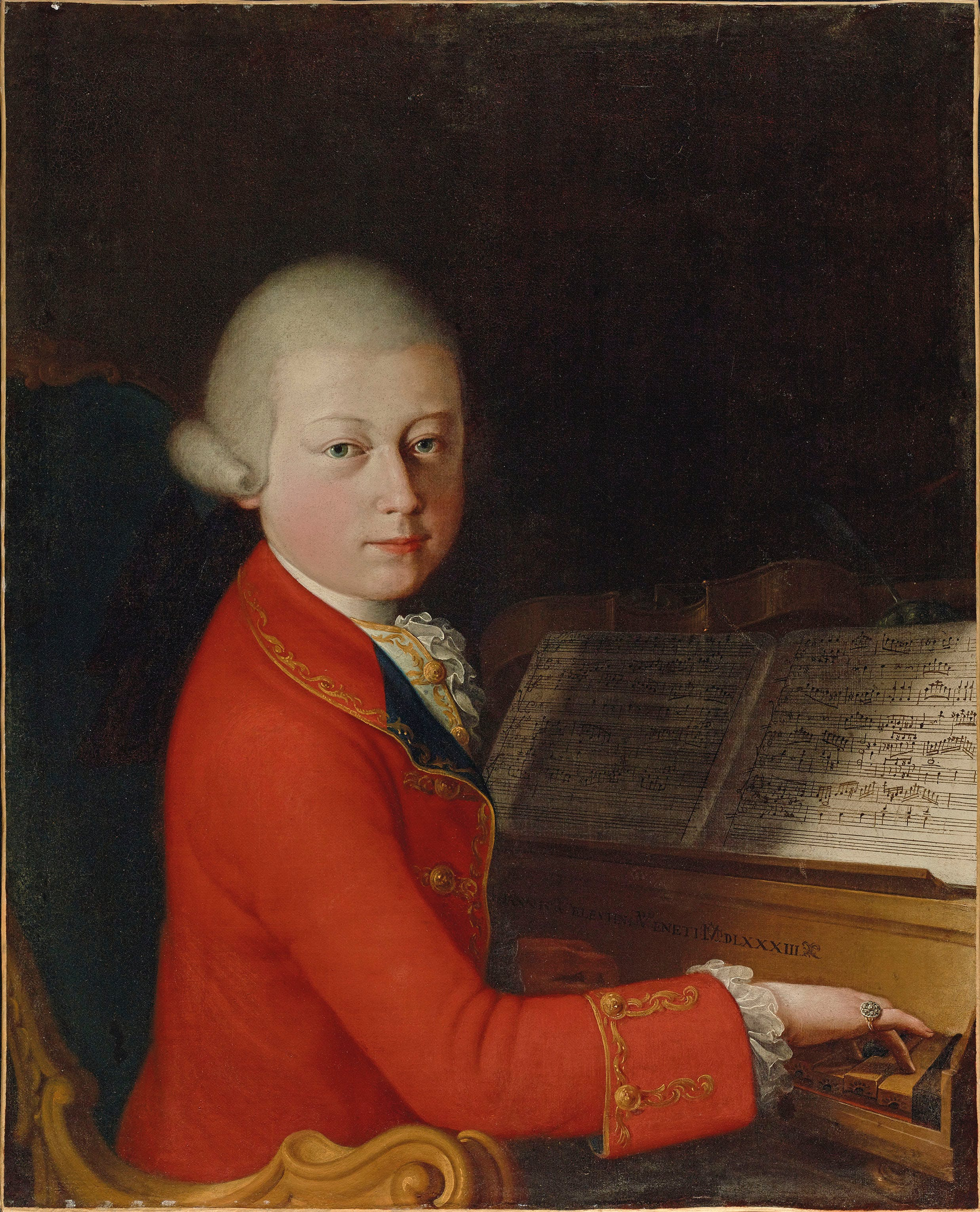
- 1770 Verona portrait of Mozart
- Librettist: Pietro Metastasio
- Language: Italian
- Based on: Somnium Scipionis by Cicero
- Premiere: 1 May 1772 (?); Archbishop's Palace, Salzburg (incomplete performance)

Il sogno di Scipione, K. 126, is a dramatic serenade in one act (azione teatrale) composed by Wolfgang Amadeus Mozart to a libretto by Pietro Metastasio, which is based on the book Somnium Scipionis by Cicero; Metastasio's libretto has been set to music several times. Mozart had originally composed the work at the age of 15 for his patron, Prince-Archbishop Sigismund von Schrattenbach. After the bishop's death before it could be performed, Mozart dedicated it to Schrattenbach's successor, Count Colloredo. It was given a private performance in the Archbishop's Palace in Salzburg on 1 May 1772, although not in its entirety. Only one aria, the final chorus and the recitative dedicating it to the new Prince-Archbishop were performed. It is highly unlikely that it was ever performed in its entirety in Mozart's lifetime.

== Performance history ==
In January 1979, Il sogno di Scipione was exhumed for Mozart Week in Salzburg, where it was given a complete performance. The participants – Peter Schreier (Scipio), Lucia Popp (Costanza), Edita Gruberová (Fortuna), Claes-Håkan Ahnsjö (Publio), Thomas Moser (Emilio) and Edith Mathis (Licenza), with the Salzburger Kammerchor and Mozarteum Orchestra Salzburg under Leopold Hager – then made the work's first recording, issued originally on a Deutsche Grammophon LP and reissued on CD in 1991 in the Philips Complete Mozart Edition.

In 2001, Gotham Chamber Opera presented the U.S. stage premiere of Il sogno di Scipione at the Abrons Arts Center in New York City and presented a revival of the work in April 2012 at the Gerald W. Lynch Theater in New York City as part of their tenth anniversary program.

Judith Weir's 1991 chamber opera, Scipio's Dream, is based on Il sogno di Scipione with an adaptation of the original Metastasio libretto and a re-composition of the score which was cut to around one fifth of its length; it was recorded and broadcast by the BBC in a performance by Vocem and Endymion, conducted by Andrew Parrott, directed by Margaret Williams.

== Roles ==
Roles, voice types
Role	Voice type
Scipione, Scipio Africanus the Younger	tenor
Costanza (Constancy)	soprano
Fortuna (Fortune)	soprano
Publio, Scipio Africanus the Elder, Scipio's uncle and adoptive father	tenor
Emilio (Aemilius), Scipio's father	tenor
La Licenza	soprano
Chorus: Heroes

== Synopsis ==
Place: North Africa, during the reign of Massinissa, King of Eastern Numidia
Time: 200 B.C.

Fortuna and Constanza approach the sleeping Scipio and offer to accompany him through life. However, first he has to choose between Fortuna, the provider of the world’s good things, and the reliable, trustworthy Constanza.

Scipio asks for time to think. Neither in his heart nor mind can he take in what has happened, nor can he choose.

Fortuna and Constanza permit him to ask questions: he wants to know where he is. He fell asleep in the kingdom of Massinissa, but now has no idea of where he is. Fortuna tells him that he is in the Temple of Heaven. The magnificent lights are the stars against the blue background of the universe. He can hear the music of the harmony of the spheres.

Scipio asks who creates this harmony. Constanza replies that the power behind it moves the spheres like strings on a zither, finely tuned by hand and ear. Scipio responds by asking why this sound is inaudible to mortals on earth. Constanza explains that this is due to the inadequacy of their senses; looking at the sun, they see only the glare, whilst hearing a waterfall, they know nothing of its destructive power. Scipio then asks who dwells in this eternal world. Fortuna indicates an approaching cortege – heroes, his forefathers, Rome's greatest sons. Scipio sees the dead Publius and asks if dead heroes live here. Publius assures him that the light of immortality resurrects the body, freeing it from the burden of mortality. He who has thought of, felt for and devoted himself to others will live forever; those who have lived only for themselves are not deserving of immortality. Scipio goes to seek his father. He is delighted to find him, but surprised when it appears that this joy is not mutual. His father Emilio tells him that joy in heaven is complete, because it is not accompanied by suffering; he points to the Earth, small and miserable and covered in cloud, the home of mad misguided people, indifferent to other's pain.

Aghast at the sight of the Earth, Scipio begs his father to be allowed to remain in the eternal land. However, he is told by Publius that he has a great mission to complete on Earth – to destroy an enemy, after making his choice between Constanza and Fortuna.

Scipio asks Fortuna what kind of help she can offer him in completing his task. She tells him of her power to destroy and create, to corrupt innocence and empower evil. Who can resist her? Constanza says that only she can bestow the power of loyalty. Fortuna cannot go beyond the limits dictated by Constanza. Virtue can only occasionally be defeated by violence, while evil deeds, unlike good ones, are transient. Fortuna can manage rare strikes, but cannot deprive heroes of hope and faith. Thus Scipio chooses Constanza, braving Fortuna's anger unafraid, because the eternal kingdom is dearer to his heart.

Fortuna, furious, calls plagues down as vengeance on Scipio. He however keeps his courage through a foul storm. He reawakes in the kingdom of Massinissa, feeling the presence of Constanza beside him. The moral behind his dream was a hymn of praise to the eternal virtues offered by heaven, a model for all those who believe in God. In the final scene Licenza praises Scipio's choice and explains that the real protagonist of the play is not Scipio, but the dedicatee – Prince-Archbishop Hieronymus von Colloredo.

== Musical numbers ==
- Overtura
- Recitativo Fortuna, Costanza, Scipione: Vieni e segui i miei passi
- No. 1 Aria Scipione: Risolver non osa
- Recitativo Costanza, Fortuna: Giusta è la tua richiesta
- No. 2 Aria Fortuna: Lieve sono al par del vento
- Recitativo Scipione, Costanza, Fortuna: Dunque ove son?
- No. 3 Aria Costanza: Ciglio che al sol si gira
- Recitativo Scipione, Fortuna, Costanza: E quali abitatori
- No. 4 Coro: Germe di cento eroi
- Recitativo Scipione, Publio: Numi, è vero o m'inganno?
- No. 5 Aria Publio: Se vuoi che te raccolgano
- Recitativo Scipione, Fortuna, Costanza, Publio, Emilio: Se qui vivon gli eroi
- No. 6 Aria Emilio: Voi colaggiù ridete
- Recitativo Scipione, Fortuna, Costanza, Publio, Emilio: Publio, padre, ah lasciate
- No. 7 Aria Publio: Quercia annosa su l'erte pendici
- Recitativo Scipione, Costanza, Fortuna, Publio, Emilio: Giacché al voler de' fati
- No. 8 Aria Fortuna: A chi serena io miro
- Recitativo Scipione, Costanza: E a sì enorme possanza
- No. 9 Aria Costanza: Biancheggia in mar lo scoglio
- Recitativo Scipione, Fortuna: Non più, bella Costanza
- No. 10 Aria Scipione: Di' che sei l'arbitra del mondo intero
- Recitativo accompagnato Fortuna, Scipione: E v'è mortal che ardisca
- Recitativo La Licenza: Non è Scipio
- No. 11a Aria La Licenza I: Ah, perché cercar degg'io
- No. 11b Aria La Licenza II: Ah, perché cercar degg'io
- No. 12 Coro: Cento volte con lieto sembiante

== Recordings ==
- 1991 – Peter Schreier (Scipione), Lucia Popp (Costanza), Edita Gruberová (Fortuna), Claes-Håkan Ahnsjö (Publio), Thomas Moser (Emilio), Edith Mathis (Licenza) – Salzburger Kammerchor, Mozarteum Orchestra Salzburg, Leopold Hager – 2 CDs Philips Records
- 2001 – François Soons (Scipione), Claudia Patacca (Costanza), Claron McFadden (Fortuna), Terence Mierau (Publio), Marcel Reijans (Emilio), Francine van der Heyden (Licenza) – Cappella Amsterdam, Musica ad Rhenum, Jed Wentz – 2 CDs Brilliant Classics
- 2016 – Stuart Jackson (Scipione), Klara Ek (Costanza), Soraya Mafi (Fortuna), Krystian Adam (Publio), Robert Murray (Emilio), Chiara Skerath (Licenza), The Choir and Orchestra of Classical Opera, Ian Page – 2 CDs Signum Classics
