= Louise Kemény =

British-Austrian soprano

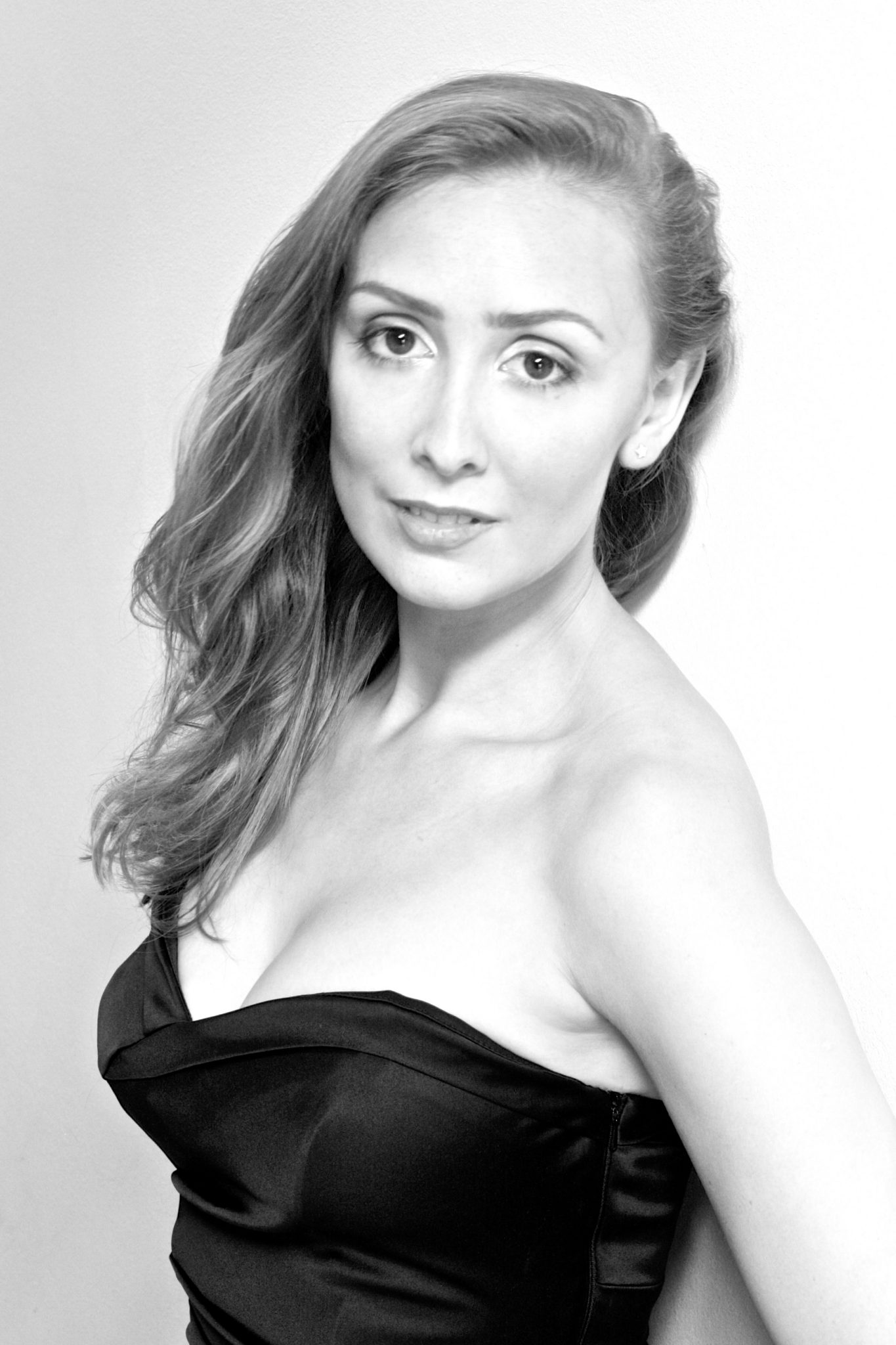
- Born: Louise Kemény
- Education: University College London University of Cambridge Royal Conservatoire of Scotland
- Occupation: Operatic soprano
- Years active: 2013–present
- Website: www.louisekemeny.co.uk

Louise Kemény is a British-Austrian opera singer and concert soprano.

== Early life and education ==
Kemény was born and grew up in West London, attending local comprehensive and grammar schools before studying English Literature at University College London and the University of Cambridge.

She went on to study at the Royal Conservatoire of Scotland, completing a fast-track vocal master’s degree. Whilst studying she was supported as a Britten-Pears Young Artist, an Independent Opera Scholar and a Yeoman of the Worshipful Company of Musicians.

== Career ==
Her career began as a member of the Glyndebourne Festival Opera Chorus in 2013-2014, where she took her first professional role in Richard Strauss's Der Rosenkavalier. Further early engagements included the role of Tytania in Scottish Opera's production of A Midsummer Night's Dream, Tiny in British Youth Opera's Paul Bunyan and Teofane in English Touring Opera's Ottone which toured throughout the UK.

In 2016 her career expanded into Europe, initially appearing at Dutch National Opera as Barbarina in Mozart's Le nozze di Figaro, conducted by Ivor Bolton, before she joined Theater Bonn as a permanent member of the ensemble from 2018-2020. Whilst in Bonn she performed Romilda in Xerxes, Pamina in Die Zauberflöte, Gretel in Hänsel und Gretel, Sophie in Der Rosenkavalier, Susanna in Le nozze di Figaro and Marzelline in Beethoven's Fidelio during the composer's 250th anniversary celebrations in the city of his birth.

In 2020 she performed the role of Seleuce in Handel's Tolomeo with Jakub Józef Orliński as part of the Händel-Festspiele Karlsruhe.

As a concert artist she has performed with Orchestra of the Age of Enlightenment, Concerto Köln, Noord Nederlands Orkest and Sinfonieorchester Basel.
