= Azione teatrale =

Azione teatrale (Italian for 'theatrical action'; plural azioni teatrali) is a genre of opera, popular in Italy and southern Europe.

An azione teatrale was typically shorter in scale, with few actors, usually no chorus, and either presented in a single act or divided into two parts. These musical plays were usually presented for dignitaries in their private palaces, or in the aristocratic theaters of their hosts. Dedicatory in nature, the plots as perfected by the leading light of The Enlightenment stage, Pietro Metastasio, revolve around the trial and personal struggle of an individual to overcome hardship, privation, or temptation on his road to being a better man.

Larger works, with more charterers, festive choruses, and often involving historical or mythological characters, were called a festa teatrale.

Examples of the genre include Traetta's Armida (1761), Mozart's Il sogno di Scipione (1772) and Haydn's L'isola disabitata (1779). Gluck's Orfeo ed Euridice (1762) also belongs to this genre, though in many ways it is atypical.

The long-term influence of this type of stage work can be felt in Charles Dickens' A Christmas Carol, in which Scrooge is confronted and offered a way to live to his full potential. As such, it is very much based on Metastasio's Il sogno di Scipione.

== See also ==
- Category:Azioni teatrali
