= Jonathan McGovern (singer) =

English baritone singer

- Born: Guildford, United Kingdom
- Education: Royal Academy of Music
- Occupation: Singer
- Website: https://www.jonathanmcgovern.co.uk

Jonathan McGovern is an English baritone singer.

== Early life and education ==
McGovern was born in Surrey, England, United Kingdom, and received professional training at the Royal Academy of Music. As the only child in the family, he enjoyed listening to Western classical music, especially Sergei Rachmaninoff and singing in choir, later singing with the Choir of King's College London as a choral scholar. He took the stage for the first time at the National Youth Music Theatre and, by the age of 12, made his debut at Glyndebourne in The Ragged Child.

== Career ==
In January 2012, McGovern sang Schumann, Britten and Ralph Vaughan Williams at the Wigmore Hall and the same year performed as Yamadori in Madama Butterfly at the English National Opera. In 2015, McGovern played the role of Pelléas in James Conway's version of Pelléas et Mélisande with the English Touring Opera. Two years later, he played the same character in the same opera under the baton of Jac van Steen at the Garsington Opera in Wormsley Park. During the 2018 season, McGovern played Pelléas in Barrie Kosky's Pelléas et Mélisande at the Komische Oper Berlin. He also performed in Jette Steckel's The Magic Flute under the direction of Jean-Christophe Spinosi at the Hamburg State Opera and played a lead role in Barbora Horáková's L'Orfeo at the Teatro Arriaga in Bilbao, Spain.

In 2018, he appeared in Michael Boyd's Don Giovanni at the Garsington Opera and then reprised his role as Papageno under Kent Nagano and made his debut with the Welsh National Opera as Prince Andrei in Prokofiev's War and Peace and Staatstheatre Klagenfurt as Pelléas. When it comes to concerts, McGovern sang in Dido and Aeneas at the Concertgebouw under the baton of Christian Curnyn and Gabriel Fauré's Requiem with the Orchestre Philharmonique de Liège under Hervé Niquet's baton. He also participated in Nico Muhly's The Last Letter with Britten Sinfonia and recorded songs by Mendelssohn with pianist Malcolm Martineau.

In 2020, he was scheduled to sing in Mozart's The Marriage of Figaro.
