= Jens Lohmann =

Mexican modern pentathlete (born 1956)

Personal information
- Born: 6 February 1956 (age 70)

Sport
- Sport: Modern pentathlon

Jens Lohmann (born 6 February 1956) is a Mexican modern pentathlete. He competed at the 1980 Summer Olympics, finishing in 36th place in the individual event.
