= Michi Gaigg =

Austrian violinist and conductor

Michi Gaigg (born 1957 in Schörfling am Attersee) is an Austrian violinist and conductor. She is founder and conductor of the Baroque orchestras L'arpa festante and L'Orfeo Barockorchester.

== Discography ==
- Georg Philipp Telemann (1681–1767): Orpheus, 2CDs Dorothee Mields, Ulrike Hofbauer, Christian Zenker, L'Orfeo Barockorchester, Michi Gaigg
- Joseph Haydn (1732–1809): Die wüste Insel (German Version of "L'isola disabitata"), 1CD Ulrike Hofbauer, Barbara Kraus, Christian Zenker, L'Orfeo Barockorchester, Michi Gaigg
- Wolfgang Amadeus Mozart (1756–1791): Betulia liberata, 2 super audio CD Margot Oitzinger, Christian Zenker and others, L'Orfeo Barockorchester, Michi Gaigg
