= Georg Matthias Monn =

Austrian composer and organist (1717–1750)

Georg Matthias Monn (born Johann Georg Mann 9 April 1717, Vienna – 3 October 1750, Vienna) was an Austrian composer, organist and music teacher whose works were fashioned in the transition from the Baroque to Classical period in music.

Together with Georg Christoph Wagenseil and Josef Starzer, Monn formed the Viennese Pre-Classical movement whose composers are nowadays mostly known only by their names. However, his successful introduction of the secondary theme in the symphony was an important element for the First Viennese School (Haydn, Mozart, Beethoven and Schubert) that would come some fifty years later.

== Biography ==
Much less is known about Monn's life than about his musical ideas. Only his appointments as an organist are known, at first in Klosterneuburg near Vienna. Afterwards, he was appointed in the same position at Melk in Lower Austria and at the Karlskirche in Vienna's Wieden district. He died of tuberculosis aged 33.

His brother, Johann Christoph Mann (1726–1782), was also a composer whose works have sometimes been confused with Monn's. The reason for this is that most of Monn's compositions only survive in copies from the 1780s and could therefore also be the works of his younger brother. There is no absolute proof that the Johann Georg Mann is the same person as the Georg Matthias Monn who died in 1750. His role as pioneer of the symphony is a scholarly image, coined in the early 20th century, and could need some basic musicological re-evaluation.

== From Baroque to Classical ==
Together with Georg Christoph Wagenseil and other contemporaries such as Leopold Mozart and Josef Starzer, Monn could be said to represent a school of Austrian composers who had thoroughly studied the principles of counterpoint as practised by Johann Sebastian Bach and Johann Joseph Fux, but also effected a change from the formalistic, imposing and ornate Baroque style to the simpler, more graceful Galante music. Moreover, they renewed the sonata form by expanding the concepts of secondary theme and development. Later on, Michael and Joseph Haydn would develop these concepts to a much greater extent.

The catalog of works written by Matthias Monn contains sixteen symphonies, a score of quartets, sonatas, masses and compositions for violin and keyboard. A harpsichord concerto by Monn was "freely" arranged by Arnold Schoenberg as a cello concerto for Pablo Casals. The Monn/Schoenberg cello concerto in D major has been recorded by Yo-Yo Ma and many other cellists. Schoenberg also wrote "continuo realizations" for several works by Monn, including a cello concerto in G minor which was recorded by Jacqueline du Pré.

== List of works ==
- Sixteen symphonies including
  - Symphony in G major (also called Sinfonia in G major)
  - Symphony in B♭ major
  - Symphony in B major
  - Symphony in F major
- Six Quartets
- Concertos including
  - Concerto for Violin, Strings and Continuo in B♭ major
  - Keyboard concerto in D major
  - Cello concerto in D major (freely transcribed from Monn's harpsichord concerto by Arnold Schoenberg)
  - Concerto for Cello (or Double Bass) in G minor
  - Concerto for Harpsichord, Strings and Continuo in G minor (after Cello Concerto)
  - Concerto for Harpsichord in G minor
  - Concerto for Harpsichord, Strings and Continuo in D major
  - Concerto in A for Fortepiano and Strings
- Sonata in G minor
- Partitas, including
  - Partita a tre no. 2 in G minor
  - Partita a tre no. 7 in D major

Organ works:

- 5 Preludia und Fugue
- Fugue in C
- Versetten for Organ
