= Franz Ignaz Beck =

German musician (1734–1809)

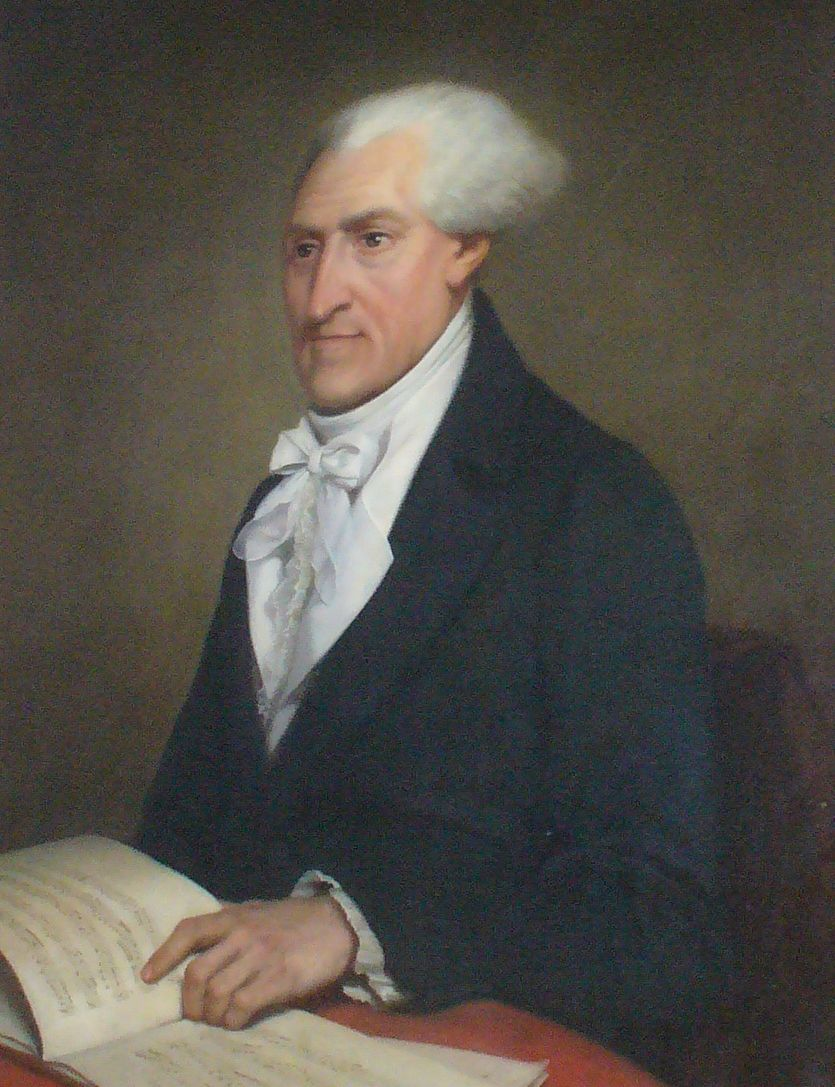
- Franz Ignaz Beck in c. 1795
- Born: 20 February 1734; Mannheim
- Died: 31 December 1809 (aged 75); Bordeaux, France
- Occupations: Violinist; Composer; Conductor; Theater manager; Music pedagogue
- Organizations: Grand Théâtre de Bordeaux

Franz Ignaz Beck (20 February 1734 – 31 December 1809) was a German violinist, composer, conductor and music teacher. He spent the greater part of his life in France, where he became director of the Grand Théâtre de Bordeaux. Possibly the most talented pupil of Johann Stamitz, Beck is an important representative of the second generation of the so-called Mannheim school. His fame rests on his 24 symphonies that are among the most original and striking of the Classical period. He was one of the first composers to introduce the regular use of wind instruments in slow movements and put an increasing emphasis on thematic development. His taut, dramatic style is also remarkable for its employment of bold harmonic progressions, flexible rhythms and highly independent part writing.

== Life ==
=== Youth in Mannheim 1734–1754 ===
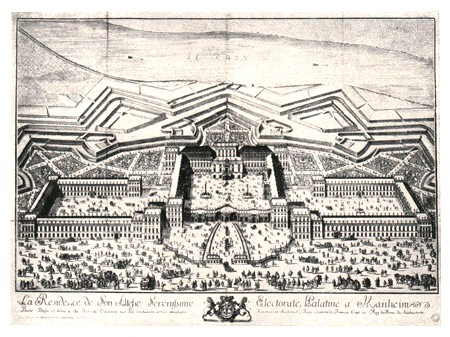
Mannheim Palace (c. 1725)

Born in Mannheim, Beck began his violin studies with his father, Johann Aloys Beck (died 1742), an oboist and rector of the Choir School at the Palatinate Court in Mannheim. He also learned double bass and organ, among other instruments, and eventually came under the tutelage of Johann Stamitz, the director of instrumental music and leader of the brilliant Mannheim court orchestra. Beck's talents were quickly recognized and Elector Charles Theodore of the Palatinate, undertook responsibility for his education. As a youth Beck was very much in favour with the Mannheim court and named chamber virtuoso of the Prince elector.

=== Violinist in Venice and Naples 1755–1757 ===
His time in Mannheim came to an abrupt end when he - seemingly fatally - wounded an opponent in a duel (allegedly because of jealousy), an act that forced him to leave Germany. It is hard to ascertain whether this is really what happened or just a Berlioz-like cloak and dagger story. The only source for this tale is Beck's pupil Henri Blanchard who published this account in a biography of his former teacher in the Revue et Gazette musicale de Paris (1845). According to Blanchard, Beck's opponent had only feigned his death, but Beck was not to learn this for several years.

When Beck's six symphonies, Op. 3, were published in Paris several years later in 1762 the edition bore this title:

SEI SINFONIE / A PIÙ STROMENTI / Composte / Dal Sigr. FRANCESCO BECK / Virtuoso di Camera di Sua / A. S. L'ELECTOR PALATINO, / & Actualmente Primo Violino / d'ell Concerto di Marsilia. /OPERA TERZA. /...Chez Mr. Venier...'

From this it is sometimes inferred that the story of Beck fighting a duel was probably a hoax. If Beck, so the reasoning goes, had in all truth been forced to flee from the Mannheim court because he had killed someone in a duel, then he would not have possessed the audacity to openly advertise the fact that he used to be a chamber virtuoso with exactly the same court. However, seen from another angle this might corroborate the truth of Blanchard's story. If Beck had indeed not killed the other man and he knew by then that everything had been a vicious prank and his opponent alive, then the story might be true after all.

Whatever the circumstances of his departure, from Mannheim Beck made his way to Venice, where he appeared as a violinist and studied composition with Baldassare Galuppi. Galuppi, whose name as a composer has faded over the centuries, was between 1750 and 1765 the most performed opera composer in Europe. In Mannheim he was especially well known. Several of his operas (16 all together) were staged at Mannheim in the middle of the 18th century. Thus, Galuppi would have known Mannheim and the fact that Mannheim had the leading orchestra in Europe. This helps to explain why Beck after his dramatic flight had probably little difficulty to establish himself in Venice and become Galuppi's pupil.

After three years in Venice he eloped to Naples with one Anna Oniga, his future wife and mother of his seven children. It seems that Beck's career as a composer started largely during his years in Italy; this may also explain why in many traits he shows himself to be quite his own man and rather independent of the typical Mannheim style.

=== Fame in France 1757–1760 ===
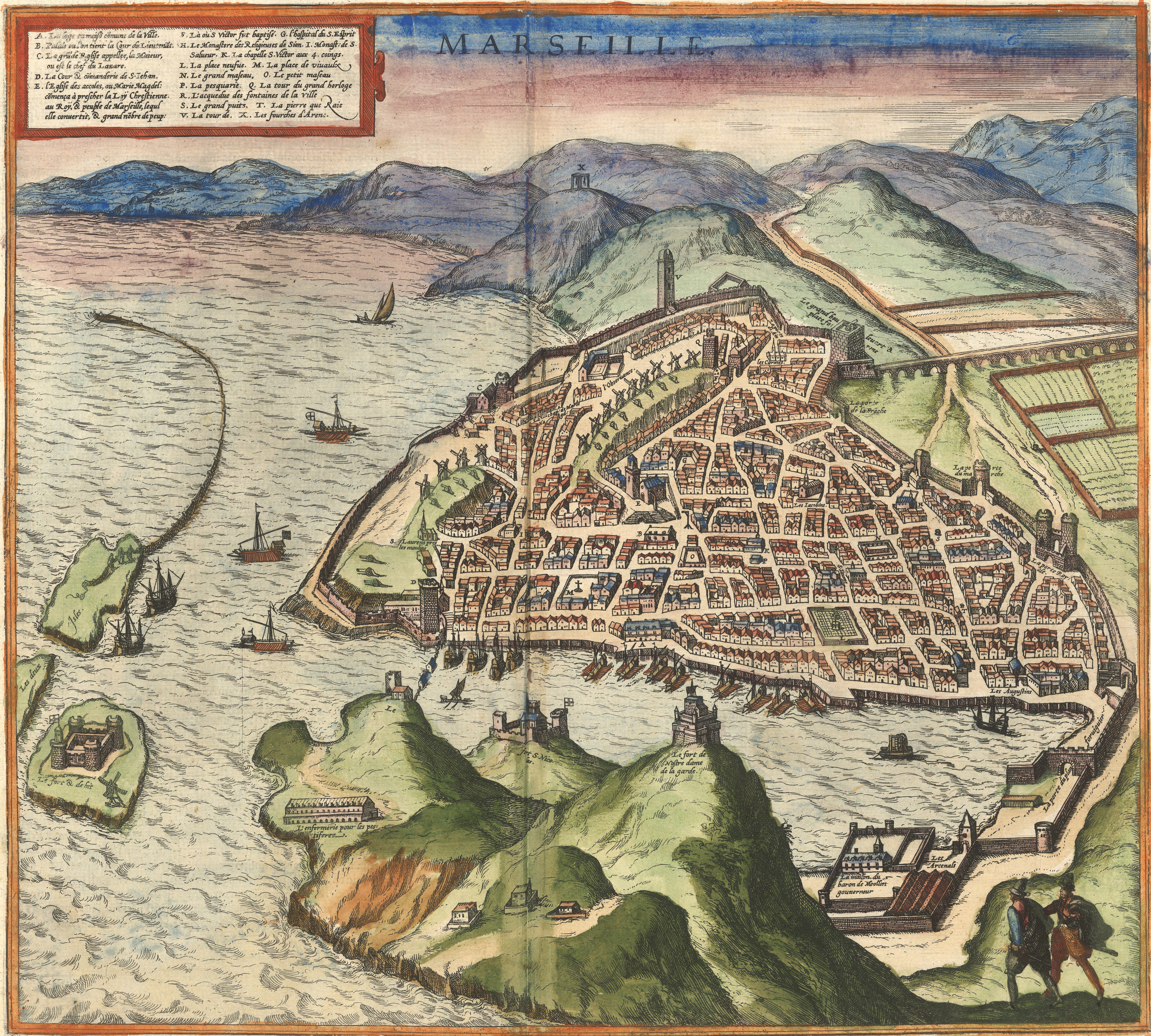
Marseille (c. 1700)

After his sojourn in Italy, Beck moved to Marseille, where he became concert master at the theatre orchestra. The exact date of his arrival in France is uncertain, but the performance of one of his symphonies in Paris in 1757 is documented. When Beck's Parisian publisher Venier announced the publication of Beck's Op. 3 in November 1762, he introduced Beck with these words: Actualmente Primo Violino del Concerto di Marsilia. Between 1757 and 1762, all of his 24 symphonies were published in rapid succession by Parisian firms. At least seven performances of Beck's symphonies are known to have been given in Marseille in 1760–1761.

=== Kapellmeister in Bordeaux 1761–1791 ===
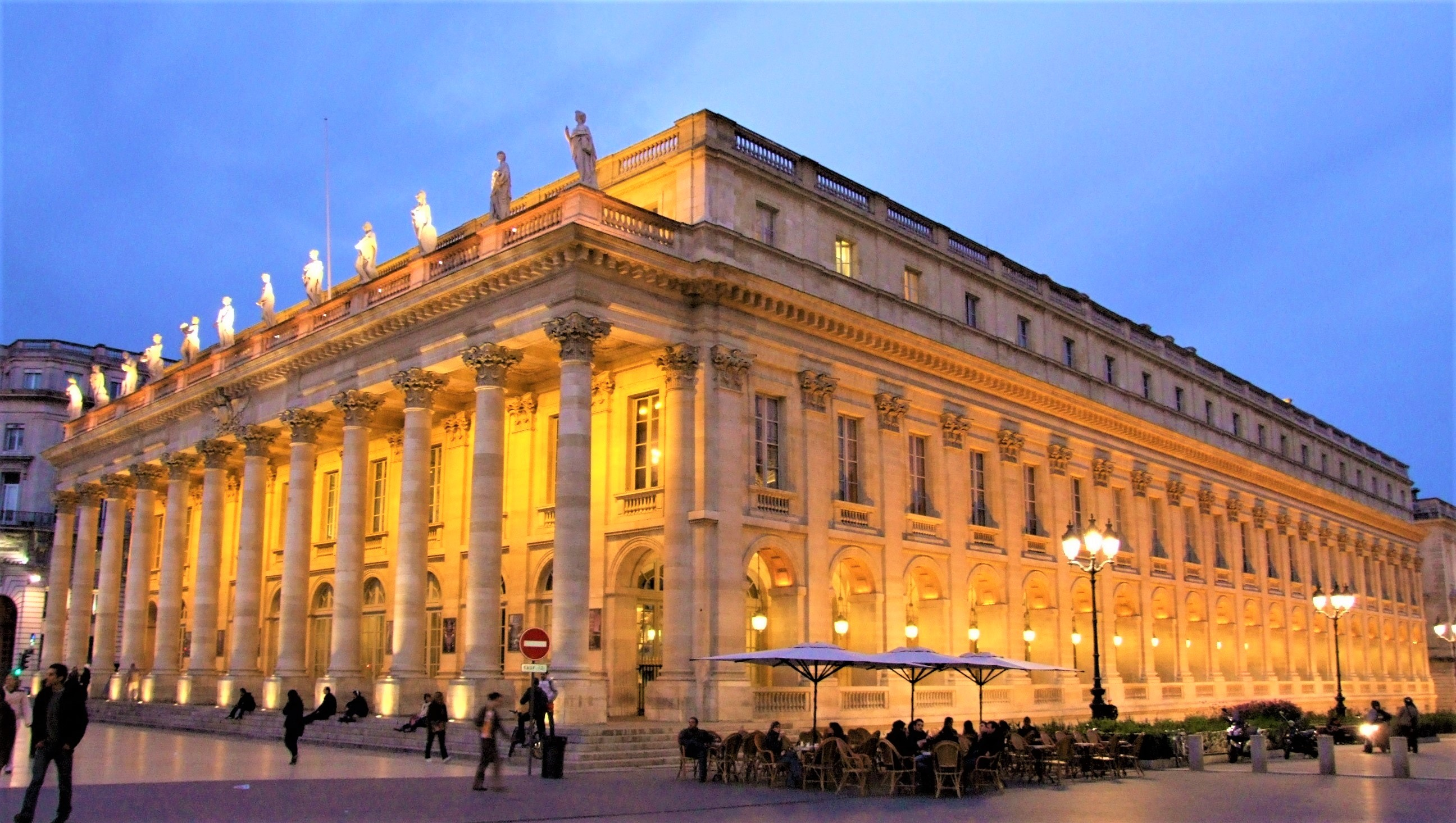
Grand Théâtre de Bordeaux (Modern view)

In 1761 Beck moved from Marseille to Bordeaux where he became director of concerts and was appointed musical director with the dramatic company of the Marechal Duc de Richelieu, which in 1780 moved into the newly built Grand Théâtre. He also was active as organist and teacher. Among his more prominent pupils were Pierre Gaveaux, Henri Blanchard and Nicolas Bochsa. On 24 October 1774 he was appointed organist at St Seurin, Bordeaux, where his improvisatory powers won him admiration from the congregation.

By the time he was settled in Bordeaux Beck's best times as a composer were all but over. Much of what he wrote there seems to have been either lost or destroyed by Beck himself. His greatest success came in 1783 when he travelled to Paris to direct the first performance of his Stabat Mater in Versailles.

As did many other composers, Beck wrote patriotic and revolutionary music during the Revolution, including a Hymne á l'Être Suprême. Nevertheless, in 1791 he got into trouble with the new authorities when through caustic remarks he openly ridiculed some overzealous partisans of the new spirit. He seems to have been a self-assured, proud and stubborn man. When he was subsequently put before a revolutionary trial in his nightshirt, he answered questions concerning his attitude towards the revolution with the exclamation: "What could I do against the revolution!?"

=== Last years in Bordeaux 1791–1809 ===
Beck's fortunes declined in the aftermath of the French Revolution. Whereas in the year 1791 he was still able to pay his mother in law a pension of 400 Livres, a few years later he was barely able to support his family.

In 1806 he sent the score of his Stabat Mater with a personal dedication to Napoleon – whether out of genuine admiration or in an attempt to ingratiate himself with the great Corsican is hard to decide.

He died in Bordeaux at age 75.

Beck had six daughters, two of whom died early. His only son was commander of a French corvette during the Napoleonic Wars, and was held captive by the English for a long time.

== Works ==
=== Orchestral ===
Beck's 24 symphonies are in three movements and follow the Italian sinfonia with the customary tempi: fast-slow-fast. The Minuet, as third movement already ubiquitous in Johann Stamitz’ symphonies, is omitted by Beck. According to records cited in the references below (Symphonies op. 3, Nr. 3-5. La Stagione Frankfurt, Michael Schneider, CPO|Symphonies op. 3, No. 3-5. The Seasons, Frankfurt, Michael Schneider, CPO), it seems that some symphonies do have four movements as well as a minuet; as for the symphonies of Stamitz, some do not have a minuet and have only three movements. The symphonies Op. 1 are scored for string orchestra; in Op. 2, No. 1 (Callen 7) in addition to the strings two French horns are demanded; op. 3 and 4 are scored for oboes and horns in addition to the string quintet.

- Six Symphonies Op. 1 (Callen 1–6; publ. Paris 1758)
- Six Symphonies Op. 2 (Callen 7–12; publ. Paris 1760)
- Six Symphonies Op. 3 (Callen 13–18; publ. Paris 1762)
- Six Symphonies Op. 4 (Callen 19–24; publ. Paris 1766)
- Symphonies Op. 10 (1760)
- Symphonies Op. 13 (1762)
- Ouverture La mort d'Orphée
- Ouverture L'île déserte
- Stabat Mater (1782)
- Orchestra quartets

=== Operas ===
- La belle jardinière (Bordeaux, August 24, 1767)
- Pandora (Paris, July 2, 1789)
- L'Isle déserte (1779, unperformed)

=== Piano or harpsichord ===
- 18 Sonatas (or Pèces) for Harpsichord or Pianoforte Op. 5 (c. 1773)
- Various pieces: L'Éveillée, L'Hypolite, La Jeliote, La Résolue, La Sophie, 2 Menuets, Allegro moderato in g minor, etc.

== Discography (selection) ==
- Six Symphonies, Op. 1. New Zealand Chamber Orchestra, Donald Armstrong, Naxos 8.554071
- Symphonies op. 3, Nr. 1, 2, 6. La Stagione, Frankfurt am Main, Michael Schneider, CPO
- Symphonies op. 3, Nr. 3-5. La Stagione, Frankfurt am Main, Michael Schneider, CPO
- Symphonies op. 4, Nr. 1-3. La Stagione, Frankfurt am Main, Michael Schneider, CPO
- Symphonies. Northern Chamber Orchestra, Nicholas Ward, Naxos 8.553790 (2 symphonies by Gossec and 3 by Beck)
- Sonatas for Keyboard, Op5, Anders Muskens, Leaf Music (performed on original instruments)

== Sources ==
- Badley, Allan. Franz Ignaz Beck - Six Symphonies, Op. 1 (CD-Booklet). Naxos Rights International Ltd., 2005.
- Badley, Allan. Franz Ignaz Beck - Six Symphonies, Op. 1 (CD-Booklet). Naxos Rights International Ltd., 2005.Online version
- Blume, Friedrich, Hrsg. Die Musik in Geschichte und Gegenwart. Allgemeine Enzyklopädie der Musik. Ungekürzte elektronische Ausgabe der ersten Auflage. Kassel: Bärenreiter, 1949–1987.
- Slonimsky, Nicolas, ed. Baker's Biographical Dictionary of Musicians. 5th Completely Revised Edition. New York, 1958.
- Walther Killy, Rudolf Vierhaus (eds.) Deutsche Biographische Enzyklopäde (German Biographic Encyclopaedia). Bd. (Vol.) 5. K-G. 10 Bde. (Vols.) Munich: KG Saur, 1999. ISBN 3-598-23186-5
- Würtz, Roland, Hrsg. (ed.) Mannheim und Italien. Zur Vorgeschichte der Mannheimer. Mainz: Schott, 1984. ISBN 3-7957-1326-9
