= List of symphonies by number =

Most symphonies by classical composers after the baroque era are indicated by a number.

== 0–40 ==
- Symphony No. 0
- Symphony No. 1
  - Symphony No. 1 in C major
  - Symphony No. 1 in C minor
  - Symphony No. 1 in D major
  - Symphony No. 1 in D minor
- Symphony No. 2
  - Symphony No. 2 in C minor
  - Symphony No. 2 in D major
- Symphony No. 3
  - Symphony No. 3 in E-flat major
- Symphony No. 4
  - Symphony No. 4 in E-flat major
- Symphony No. 5
  - Symphony No. 5 in B-flat
  - Symphony No. 5 in D major
- Symphony No. 6
  - Symphony No. 6 in B minor
  - Symphony No. 6 in F major
- Symphony No. 7
- Symphony No. 8
- Symphony No. 9
  - Symphony No. 9 in D minor
  - Symphony No. 9 in E minor
- Symphony No. 10
- Symphony No. 11
- Symphony No. 12
- Symphony No. 13
- Symphony No. 14
- Symphony No. 15
- Symphony No. 16
- Symphony No. 17
- Symphony No. 18
- Symphony No. 19
- Symphony No. 20
- Symphony No. 21
- Symphony No. 22
- Symphony No. 23
- Symphony No. 24
- Symphony No. 25
- Symphony No. 26
- Symphony No. 27
- Symphony No. 28
- Symphony No. 29
- Symphony No. 30
- Symphony No. 31
- Symphony No. 32
- Symphony No. 33
- Symphony No. 34
- Symphony No. 35
- Symphony No. 36
- Symphony No. 37
- Symphony No. 38
- Symphony No. 39
- Symphony No. 40

== 41–66 ==
- Symphony No. 41
- Symphony No. 48
- Symphony No. 50
- Symphony No. 60
- Symphony No. 63
- Symphony No. 66

== Specific composers ==
- List of symphonies by Joseph Haydn
- List of symphonies by Wolfgang Amadeus Mozart
- List of symphonies by Leif Segerstam
