= List of symphonies in E-flat major =

This is a list of symphonies in E♭ major written by notable composers.

Composer	Symphony
Carl Friedrich Abel	Symphony/Overture in E♭ major, Op. 1 No. 4, D29/E4 (1759?); Symphony/Overture in E♭ major, Op. 4 No. 3, D34/E9 (1762); Symphony in E♭ major, Op. 7 No. 6, E18 (1767, once mistakenly attributed to W. A. Mozart as his Symphony No. 3, K. 18); Symphony in E♭ major, Op. 10 No. 3, E21 (1773); Symphony/Overture in E♭ major, Op. 14 No. 2, E26; Symphony/Overture in E♭ major, Op. 14 No. 6, E30; Sinfonia in E♭ major, Op. 17 No. 1, E31 (1783); Symphony in E♭ major, Six Prussian Symphonies No. 3, E43
Carl Philipp Emanuel Bach	Symphony in E♭ major, Wq.179 / H654 (1757, rev. later); Symphony in E♭ major, Wq.183:2 / H664 (1775)
Johann Christian Bach	Symphony, Op. 6 No. 2
Johann Christoph Friedrich Bach	Symphony in E♭ major, BR-JCFB C 14 / Wf I/10 (ca. 1770); Symphony in E♭ major, BR-JCFB C 24 / Wf I/18 (ca. 1792, lost); Symphony in E♭ major, BR-JCFB C 25 / Wf I/19 (ca. 1792, lost)
Carlos Baguer	At least three symphonies, Nos. 12, 13 and 15 (by 1808, composer's death)
Béla Bartók	Symphony (1902, unfinished)
Arnold Bax	Symphony No. 4 in E♭ (1931, Parlett No. 307)
Franz Ignaz Beck	Symphony No. 4 (Op. 3, Callen 16)
Ludwig van Beethoven	Symphony No. 3 "Eroica", Op. 55 (1803-04); Symphony No. 10 (sketched between 1824-27, first movement completed by Barry Cooper in 1988)
Jiří Antonín Benda	Symphony "No. 6" (by c.1760)
William Sterndale Bennett	Symphony No. 1 (1832)
Franz Berwald	Symphony No. 4 "Naïve" (1845)
Luigi Boccherini	Symphony in E♭ major, Op. 21/2, G. 494 (1775); Symphony No. 2 in E♭ major, Op. 12/2, G. 504 (1771); Symphony No. 8 in E♭ major, Op. 35/2, G. 510 (1782); Symphony No. 11 in E♭ major, Op. 35/5, G. 513 (1787)
Alexander Borodin	Symphony No. 1 (1862-7)
Sergei Bortkiewicz	Symphony No. 2, Op. 55 (1947)
Johann Evangelist Brandl	Symphony, Op. 12 (1792)
Havergal Brian	Symphony No. 21 (1962); Symphony No. 29 (1967)
Antonio Brioschi	Three sinfonie: w/o opus (1735), Op. 5 and Op. 6 (1740s)
Max Bruch	Symphony No. 1, Op. 28 (first performed in 1868)
Anton Bruckner	Symphony No. 4 "Romantic" (1874)
Fritz Brun	Symphony No. 5 (1929)
Antonio Casimir Cartellieri	Symphony No. 2 (after 1795); Symphony No. 4 (after 1795)
Christian Cannabich	Symphony No. 54; Symphony No. 57
Wojciech Dankowski	Symphony (around 1788)
Franz Danzi	Symphony, P.219 (before 1826)
Félicien-César David	Symphony (1846)
Georg Druschetzky	Symphony in E♭ major
Franz Xaver Dussek	Symphony (before c.1778)
Antonín Dvořák	Symphony No. 3, Op. 10, B. 34 (1873)
Anton Eberl	Symphony Op. 33 (1803)
Joachim Nicolas Eggert	Symphony (1807)
Edward Elgar	Symphony No. 2, Op. 63 (1909–11)
George Enescu	Symphony No. 1 (1905)
Frederic Ernest Fesca	Symphony No. 1, Op. 6 (1812)
François-Joseph Fétis	Symphony No. 1 (1862)
Zdeněk Fibich	Symphony No. 2, Op. 38 (1893)
Anton Fils	Symphony (by 1760)
Robert Fuchs	Symphony No. 2, Op. 45
Jan Adam Gallina	Symphony (before 1773)
John Gardner	Symphony No. 2 (1984–85)
Friedrich Gernsheim	Symphony No. 2, Op. 46 (1882)
Georg Gerson	Symphony (1813)
Alexander Glazunov	Symphony No. 4, Op. 48 (1893); Symphony No. 8, Op. 83 (1905)
Reinhold Glière	Symphony No. 1, Op. 8 (1899–1900)
Karl Goldmark	Symphony No. 2, Op. 35 (1887)
Charles Gounod	Symphony No. 2 (1855)
Johann Gottlieb Graun	Symphony in E♭ major, GraunWV A:XII:13
Adalbert Gyrowetz (Vojtěch Jírovec)	At least 3 symphonies, Opp. 6/2, 8 ("Great") and 18 (1780s-90s?)
Johannes Haarklou	Symphony No. 4 (1920–22)
Jacob Adolf Hägg	Symphony No. 1 "Nordic" (1871/1899)
Joseph Haydn	Symphony No. 11 in E♭ major Symphony No. 22 in E♭ major, Philosopher (1764); Symphony No. 36 in E♭ major (composed by 1769); Symphony No. 55 in E♭ major, Schoolmaster (1774); Symphony No. 74 in E♭ major (1780 or 1781); Symphony No. 76 in E♭ major (1782?); Symphony No. 84 in E♭ major, In Nomine Domini (1786); Symphony No. 91 in E♭ major (1788); Symphony No. 99 in E♭ major (1793); Symphony No. 103 in E♭ major, Drumroll (1795)
Michael Haydn	Symphony No. 1D, MH 35 (1760); Symphony No. 26, MH 340, Perger 17 (1783); Symphony No. 34, MH 473, Perger 26 (1788)
Alfred Hill	Symphony No. 12 (1959)
Paul Hindemith	Symphony in E♭ (1940)
Ernst Theodor Amadeus Hoffmann	Symphony in E♭ major (1804)
Ignaz Holzbauer	Symphony Op. 3 No. 1 Symphony Op. 4 No. 3
Jānis Ivanovs	Symphony No. 20 (1981)
Jan Kalivoda	Symphony No. 2, Op. 17 (1829)
Edvin Kallstenius	Symphony No. 1, Op. 16 (Sinfonia concentrata) (1926)
Jan Bedřich Kittl	Symphony No. 2 (?) (composer's dates 1806–68)
Joseph Martin Kraus	Symphony in E♭, VB 144 (1783)
Franz Krommer	Symphony No. 5, Op. 105 (published 1815)
Joseph Küffner	Symphony No. 5, Op. 142
Franz Lachner	Symphony No. 1, Op. 32 (1828)
Sylvio Lazzari	Symphony (1907)
Simon Le Duc	Symphony "No. 3" (1777)
Ruben Liljefors	Symphony, Op. 14 (1906)
Leevi Madetoja	Symphony No. 2, Op. 35 (1918)
Gustav Mahler	Symphony No. 8 "Symphony of a Thousand" (1906)
John Marsh	Symphony No. 5 (12) (1783)
George W. H. Marshall Hall	Symphony No. 2 (1903)
Jāzeps Medinš	Symphony No. 3 (1941)
Ernest John Moeran	Symphony No. 2 (sketched between 1939 and 1950, completed by Martin Yates in 2011)
Georg Matthias Monn	Symphony (by 1750)
Francisco Javier Moreno	Symphony (ca.1800)
Alexander Moyzes	Symphony No. 4, Op. 38 (1947/1957)
Wolfgang Amadeus Mozart	Symphony No. 1, K. 16 (1764); Symphony No. 3, K. 18 (1764); Symphony No. 19 in E♭ major, K. 132 (1772); Symphony No. 26 in E♭ major, K. 184 (1773); Symphony No. 39, K. 543 (1788)
Nikolai Myaskovsky	Symphony No. 19 for wind band, Op. 46 (1939)
Josef Netzer	Symphony No. 4 (c. 1849)
Ludvig Norman	Symphony No. 2, Op. 40
Per August Ölander	Symphony (c.1868)
Carlo d'Ordoñez	Symphonies "Brown Eb1", "Brown Eb2", "Brown Eb3", "Brown Eb4", "Brown Eb5"
Boris Parsadanian	Symphony No. 2, Op. 6 "Martyros Sarian" (1961)
Václav Pichl	Symphony, Z.3 "Urania" (1764); Symphony, Z.24 (c.1769)
Ignaz Pleyel	Symphony, Ben.134
Cipriani Potter	Symphony No. 8 (1828)
Anton Reicha	Symphony, Op. 41 (about 1800)
Prince Heinrich XXIV Reuss of Köstritz	Symphony No. 6 (pub. 1909)
Ferdinand Ries	Symphony No. 3, Op. 90 (1813); Symphony "No. 8", WoO 30 (1822)
Bernhard Romberg	Symphony No. 2, Op. 28
Antonio Rosetti	Nine Symphonies, Murray cat. A23 - A31 incl. (dates between 1773 - 1789) (Attribution of A25 and A31 questioned)
Johann Rufinatscha	Symphony No. 2 (1840)
Giovanni Battista Sammartini	Symphony, J-C 26
Camille Saint-Saëns	Symphony No. 1, Op. 2 (1853)
Theodor von Schacht	Symphony (1790s); Symphony "Echo" (1790s)
Franz Schmidt	Symphony No. 2 (1911–13)
Joseph Schmidt	Symphony (pub. 1797) [composer died 1791]
Robert Schumann	Symphony No. 3, Op. 97 "Rhenish" (1850)
Johanna Senfter	Symphony No. 6 (?mid-1900s)
Giovanni Sgambati	Symphony No. 2 (1884)
Dmitri Shostakovich	Symphony No. 3, Op. 20 "First of May" (1931); Symphony No. 9, Op. 70 (1945)
Jean Sibelius	Symphony No. 5, Op. 82 (1915, rev 1916–9)
Christian Sinding	Symphony No. 4 (1935–36)
Louis Spohr	Symphony No. 1, Op. 20 (1811); Symphony No. 10, Op. posth. (1857)
Carl Stamitz	Symphony, Op. 9 No. 6
Johann Stamitz	Symphony, Op. 11 No. 3 (1754-5)
Charles Villiers Stanford	Symphony No. 6, Op. 94 "In honour of the life-work of a great artist: George Frederick Watts" (1905)
Igor Stravinsky	Symphony in E♭, Op. 1 (1907)
Pyotr Ilyich Tchaikovsky	Symphony in E♭ (1889–92) (reconstruction of the composer's intentions — the first movement became the third piano concerto, two other movements became an Andante and Finale for the concerto later arranged by Sergei Taneyev)
Friedrich-Eugen Thurner	Symphony
Anton Urspruch	Symphony, Op. 14 (1881)
Jan Nepomuk Vent	Symphony (by 1800)
Johann Baptist Wanhal	Symphony (Bryan Eb1, with La Tempesta finale)
Felix Weingartner	Symphony No. 2, Op. 29 (1900)
Samuel Wesley	Symphony (1784)
Christian Wilhelm Westerhoff	Symphony (1796)
Christoph Ernst Friedrich Weyse	Symphony No. 5, DF 121 (1796, rev. 1838); Symphony No. 7, DF 123 (1799)
Johann Wilhelm Wilms	Symphony No. 3, Op. 14 (by 1809)
Ernst Wilhelm Wolf	Symphony (date unknown)
Francesco Zappa	Two symphonies (c.1770s)
Niccolò Zingarelli	Symphony "No. 2" (before 1800)
Bernard Zweers	Symphony No. 2 (1882–83)
