= Symphony No. 1 =

Symphony No. 1 may refer to:

== Symphonies ==
- Symphony No. 1 (Albert) (RiverRun) by Stephen Albert, 1983
- Symphony No. 1 (Alwyn) by William Alwyn, 1948–49
- Symphony No. 1 (Arnold) by Malcolm Arnold, 1949
- Symphony No. 1 (Aubin) by Tony Aubin, 1935–37
- Symphony No. 1 (Balada) (Sinfonía en negro: Homage to Martin Luther King) by Leonardo Balada, 1968
- Symphony No. 1 (Balakirev) in C major by Mily Balakirev, 1864–97
- Symphony No. 1 (Barber) (Op. 9, Symphony in One Movement) by Samuel Barber, 1936
- Symphony No. 1 (Bax) by Arnold Bax, 1922
- Symphony No. 1 (Beethoven) in C major (Op. 21) by Ludwig van Beethoven, 1795–1801
- Symphony No. 1 (Ben-Haim) by Paul Ben-Haim, 1939–40
- Symphony No. 1 (Bernstein) (Jeremiah) by Leonard Bernstein, 1942
- Symphony No. 1 (Berwald) in G minor (Sérieuse) by Franz Berwald, 1842
- Symphony No. 1 (Borodin) in E♭ major by Alexander Borodin, 1862-67
- Symphony No. 1 (Bowen) in G major (Op. 4) by York Bowen, 1902
- Symphony No. 1 (Braga Santos) in D by Joly Braga Santos, 1946
- Symphony No. 1 (Brahms) in C minor (Op. 68) by Johannes Brahms, 1855–76
- Symphony No. 1 (Branca) (Tonal Plexus) by Glenn Branca, 1981
- Symphony No. 1 (Brian) in D minor (Gothic) by Havergal Brian, 1919–27
- Symphony No. 1 (Bruch) in E♭ major (Op. 28) by Max Bruch, 1868
- Symphony No. 1 (Bruckner) in C minor (WAB 101) by Anton Bruckner, 1865–91
- Symphony No. 1 (Carter) by Elliott Carter, 1942
- Symphony No. 1 (Chávez) (Sinfonía de Antígona) by Carlos Chávez, 1933
- Symphony No. 1 (Clementi) in C major (WoO 32) by Muzio Clementi
- Symphony No. 1 (Copland) (Symphony for Organ and Orchestra) by Aaron Copland, 1924
- Symphony No. 1 (Corigliano) by John Corigliano, 1988–89
- Symphony No. 1 (Davies) by Peter Maxwell Davies, 1973–76
- Symphony No. 1 (Diamond) by David Diamond, 1940
- Symphony No. 1 (Dohnányi) in D minor (Op. 9) by Ernő Dohnányi, 1900–01
- Symphony No. 1 (Doráti) by Antal Doráti
- Symphony No. 1 (Dutilleux) by Henri Dutilleux, 1951
- Symphony No. 1 (Dvořák) in C minor (Op. 3, B. 9, The Bells of Zlonice) by Antonín Dvořák, 1865
- Symphony No. 1 (Elgar) in A♭ major (Op. 55) by Edward Elgar, 1908
- Symphony No. 1 (Enescu) in E♭ (Op. 13) by George Enescu, 1905
- Symphony No. 1 (English) in A major (Op. 4) by George English, 1932
- Symphony No. 1 (Ficher) (Op. 20, Chamber Symphony) by Jacobo Ficher, 1932
- Symphony No. 1 (Frankel) (Op. 33) by Benjamin Frankel, 1958
- Symphony No. 1 (Furtwängler) in B minor by Wilhelm Furtwängler, 1938–41
- Symphony No. 1 (Glass) (Low) by Philip Glass, 1992
- Symphony No. 1 (Glazunov) in E major (Op. 5, Slavonian) by Alexander Glazunov, 1881
- Symphony No. 1 (Glière) in E♭ major (Op. 8) by Reinhold Glière, 1900
- Symphony No. 1 (Goldmark) in E♭ major (Op. 26, Rustic Wedding Symphony) by Karl Goldmark, 1875
- Symphony No. 1 (Górecki) (Op. 14, 1959) by Henryk Górecki, 1959
- Symphony No. 1 (Gottschalk) (D. 104, RO 255, La nuit des tropiques) by Louis Moreau Gottschalk, 1859
- Symphony No. 1 (Gounod) in D major by Charles Gounod, 1855
- Symphony No. 1 (Hanson) (Op.21, Nordic) by Howard Hanson, 1922
- Symphony No. 1 (Harbison) by John Harbison, 1981
- Symphony No. 1 (Hartmann) (Versuch eines Requiem) by Karl Amadeus Hartmann, 1936–55
- Symphony No. 1 (Haydn) in D major (Hoboken I/1) by Joseph Haydn, 1759
- Symphony No. 1 (McTee) (Ballet for Orchestra) by Cindy McTee
- Symphony No. 1 (Michael Haydn) in C major (Perger 35, Sherman 1, MH 23) by Michael Haydn, c. 1758
- Symphony No. 1 (Henze) by Hans Werner Henze, 1947
- Symphony No. 1 (Herrmann) by Bernard Herrmann, 1941
- Symphony No. 1 (Hill) in B♭ major (Stiles 1.3.4.1 Sy1, Maori) by Alfred Hill, 1898
- Symphony No. 1 (Honegger) by Arthur Honegger, 1929–30
- Symphony No. 1 (Hovhaness) (Op. 17, No. 2, Exile) by Alan Hovhaness, 1936
- Symphony No. 1 (Ives) in D minor by Charles Ives, 1898–1902
- Symphony No. 1 (Kachaturian) in E minor by Aram Khachaturian, 1934
- Symphony No. 1 (Kalinnikov) in G minor by Vasily Kalinnikov, 1894–95
- Symphony No. 1 (Kalabis) by Viktor Kalabis, 1956–57
- Symphony No. 1 (Kalomiris) (Levendia) by Manolis Kalomiris, 1918–20
- Symphony No. 1 (Langgaard) in B minor ( by Rued Langgaard, 1908–11
- Symphony No. 1 (Lange-Müller) in D minor (Op. 17) by Peter Lange-Müller, 1879
- Symphony No. 1 (Lajtha) in D minor (Op. 24) by László Lajtha, 1936
- Symphony No. 1 (Lilburn) by Douglas Lilburn, 1949
- Symphony No. 1 (Lutosławski) by Witold Lutosławski, 1941–47
- Symphony No. 1 (MacMillan) (Vigil) by James MacMillan, 1997
- Symphony No. 1 (Madetoja) in F major (Op. 29) by Leevi Madetoja, 1914–16
- Symphony No. 1 (Magnard) in C minor (Op. 4) by Albéric Magnard, 1890
- Symphony No. 1 (Mahler) in D major by Gustav Mahler, 1887–88
- Symphony No. 1 (Martinů) (H. 289) by Bohuslav Martinů, 1942
- Symphony No. 1 (Méhul) in G minor by Étienne Méhul, 1808–09
- Symphony No. 1 (de Meij) (The Lord of the Rings) by Johan de Meij, 1984–87
- Symphony No. 1 (Melartin) in C minor (Op. 30 No. 1) by Erkki Melartin, 1902
- Symphony No. 1 (Mendelssohn) in C minor (Op. 11) by Felix Mendelssohn, 1824
- Symphony No. 1 (Mennin) by Peter Mennin, 1942
- Symphony No. 1 (Milhaud) (Op. 210) by Darius Milhaud, 1939
- Symphony No. 1 (Mohaupt) (Rhythm and Variations) by Richard Mohaupt, 1939–40
- Symphony No. 1 (Mozart) in E♭ major (K. 16) by Wolfgang Amadeus Mozart, 1764
- Symphony No. 1 (Myaskovsky) in C minor (Op. 3) by Nikolai Myaskovsky, 1908, revised 1921
- Symphony No. 1 (Natra) by Sergiu Natra, 1944
- Symphony No. 1 (Nepomuk David) in A minor by Johann Nepomuk David, 1936–37
- Symphony No. 1 (Nielsen) in G minor (Op. 7, FS 16) by Carl Nielsen, 1891–92
- Symphony No. 1 (Paine) in C minor by John Knowles Paine, 1872–75
- Symphony No. 1 (Panufnik) (Sinfonia Rustica) by Andrzej Panufnik, 1948
- Symphony No. 1 (Pärt) (Op. 9, Polyphonic) by Arvo Pärt, 1963
- Symphony No. 1 (Penderecki) by Krzysztof Penderecki, 1973
- Symphony No. 1 (Piston) by Walter Piston, 1937
- Symphony No. 1 (Popov) (Op. 7) by Gavriil Popov, 1929–30
- Symphony No. 1 (Price) in E minor by Florence Price, 1932
- Symphony No. 1 (Prokofiev) in D major (Op. 25, Classical) by Sergei Prokofiev, 1916–17
- Symphony No. 1 (Rachmaninoff) in D minor (Op. 13) by Sergei Rachmaninoff, 1895
- Symphony No. 1 (Raff) in D major (Op. 96, To the Fatherland) by Joachim Raff, 1859–61
- Symphony No. 1 (Reşit Rey) by Cemal Reşit Rey, 1941
- Symphony No. 1 (Rimsky-Korsakov) in E minor (Op. 1) by Nikolai Rimsky-Korsakov, 1861–65
- Symphony No. 1 (Rivier) by Jean Rivier, 1931
- Symphony No. 1 (Rouse) by Christopher Rouse, 1986
- Symphony No. 1 (Roussel) in D minor (Op. 7, The Poem of the Forest) by Albert Roussel, 1904-06
- Symphony No. 1 (Rubbra) (Op. 44) by Edmund Rubbra, 1937
- Symphony No. 1 (Saint-Saëns) in E♭ major (Op. 2) by Camille Saint-Saëns, 1853
- Symphony No. 1 (Sallinen) (Op. 24) by Aulis Sallinen, 1970–71
- Symphony No. 1 (Scherber) in D minor by Martin Scherber, 1938
- Symphony No. 1 (Schmidt) in E major by Franz Schmidt, 1896–99
- Symphony No. 1 (Schnittke) by Alfred Schnittke, 1969–1974
- Symphony No. 1 (Schubert) in D major (D. 82) by Franz Schubert, 1813
- Symphony No. 1 (Schumann) in B♭ major (Op. 38, Spring) by Robert Schumann, 1841
- Symphony No. 1 (Scriabin) (Op. 26) by Alexander Scriabin, 1899–1900
- Symphony No. 1 (Sessions) by Roger Sessions, 1927
- Symphony No. 1 (Shostakovich) in F minor (Op. 10) by Dmitri Shostakovich, 1924–25
- Symphony No. 1 (Sibelius) in E minor (Op. 39) by Jean Sibelius, 1898–99
- Symphony No. 1 (Simpson) by Robert Simpson, 1951
- Symphony No. 1 (Spohr) in E♭ major (Op. 20) by Louis Spohr, 1811
- Symphony No. 1 (Stanford) in B♭ major by Charles Villiers Stanford, 1876
- Symphony No. 1 (Still) in A♭ major (Afro-American) by William Grant Still, 1930
- Symphony No. 1 (Strauss) in D minor (TrV 94) by Richard Strauss, 1880
- Symphony No. 1 (Stravinsky) in E♭ (Op. 1, K003) by Igor Stravinsky, 1905-07, revised 1913
- Symphony No. 1 (Suk) in E major (Op. 14) by Josef Suk, 1897-99
- Symphony No. 1 (Svendsen) in D major (Op. 4) by Johan Svendsen, 1865–67
- Symphony No. 1 (Szymanowski) in F minor (Op. 15) by Karol Szymanowski, 1906–07
- Symphony No. 1 (Tchaikovsky) in G minor (Op. 13, Winter Dreams) by Pyotr Ilyich Tchaikovsky, 1866
- Symphony No. 1 (Theofanidis) by Christopher Theofanidis, 2009
- Symphony No. 1 (Tippett) by Michael Tippett, 1945
- Symphony No. 1 (Ustvolskaya) by Galina Ustvolskaya, 1955
- Symphony No. 1 (Vaughan Williams) (A Sea Symphony) by Ralph Vaughan Williams, 1903–09
- Symphony No. 1 (Villa-Lobos) (Op. 112, W114, The Unforeseen) by Heitor Villa-Lobos, 1916
- Symphony No. 1 (Walton) in B♭ minor by William Walton, 1934–35
- Symphony No. 1 (Weber) in C major by Carl Maria von Weber, 1806–07
- Symphony No. 1 (Weill) by Kurt Weill, 1921
- Symphony No. 1 (Wetz) in C minor (Op. 40) by Richard Wetz, 1915–16
- Symphony No. 1 (Williamson) (Elevamini) by Malcolm Williamson, 1956–57
- Symphony No. 1 (Zwilich) (Three Movements for Orchestra) by Ellen Taaffe Zwilich, 1982

== Other uses ==
- Symphony No. 1 (album), a 1999 album by Joe Jackson
- Symphony No. 1 (ballet), a 1981 ballet by Peter Martins
- Symphony Number One, an American chamber orchestra
  - Symphony Number One (album)

== See also ==
- Industrial Symphony No. 1, a 1990 musical play by David Lynch
- Orca Symphony No. 1, a 2013 album by Serj Tankian
- Symphony No. 1 in C major (disambiguation)
- Symphony No. 1 in C minor (disambiguation)
- Symphony No. 1 in D major (disambiguation)
- Symphony No. 1 in D minor (disambiguation)
- Number One (disambiguation) § Music-specific further disambiguation
