= Symphony No. 3 =

Symphony No. 3 may refer to:

- Symphony No. 3 (Alwyn) by William Alwyn, 1955–1956
- Symphony No. 3 (Arnold) (op. 63) by Malcolm Arnold, 1957
- Symphony No. 3 (Badings) by Henk Badings, 1934
- Symphony No. 3 (Baird) by Tadeusz Baird, 1969
- Symphony No. 3 (Bax) by Arnold Bax, 1929
- Symphony No. 3 (Beethoven) in E-flat major (Op. 55, Eroica) by Ludwig van Beethoven, 1802–04
- Symphony No. 3 (Bentoiu) (Op. 22) by Pascal Bentoiu, 1976
- Symphony No. 3 (Bernstein) (Kaddish) by Leonard Bernstein, 1963
- Symphony No. 3 (Berwald) in C major (Singulière) by Franz Berwald, 1845
- Symphony No. 3 (Brahms) in F major (Op. 90) by Johannes Brahms, 1883
- Symphony No. 3 (Brian) in C-sharp minor by Havergal Brian, 1931–32
- Symphony No. 3 (Bruch) in E major (Op. 51) by Max Bruch, 1887
- Symphony No. 3 (Bruckner) in D minor (WAB 103, Wagner) by Anton Bruckner, 1872–1889
- Symphony No. 3 (Chávez) by Carlos Chávez, 1951–54
- Symphony No. 3 (Ching) (Rituals) by Jeffrey Ching, 1997–98
- Symphony No. 3 (Clementi) in G major (WoO 34, The Great National) by Muzio Clementi
- Symphony No. 3 (Copland) by Aaron Copland, 1944–46
- Symphony No. 3 (Corigliano) (Circus Maximus) by John Corigliano, 2005
- Symphony No. 3 (Cowell) (Gaelic) by Henry Cowell, 1942
- Symphony No. 3 (Davies) by Peter Maxwell Davies, 1984
- Symphony No. 3 (Diamond) by David Diamond, 1945
- Symphony No. 3 (Draeseke) in C major (Op. 40, Symphonia Tragica) by Felix Draeseke, 1885–86
- Symphony No. 3 (Dvořák) in E-flat major (Op. 10, B. 34) by Antonín Dvořák, c.1872
- Symphony No. 3 (Elgar/Payne), by Anthony Payne, 1997, from sketches by Edward Elgar, c. 1934
- Symphony No. 3 (Enescu) in C major (Op. 21) by George Enescu, 1916–18
- Symphony No. 3 (Ficher) (Op. 36) by Jacobo Ficher, 1938–40
- Symphony No. 3 (Finney) by Ross Lee Finney, c. 1960
- Symphony No. 3 (Furtwängler) in C-sharp minor by Wilhelm Furtwängler, 1951–54
- Symphony No. 3 (Garayev) by Gara Garayev, 1964
- Symphony No. 3 (Gerhard) (Collages) by Roberto Gerhard, 1960
- Symphony No. 3 (Giannini) by Vittorio Giannini, 1958
- Symphony No. 3 (Gillis) (A Symphony for Free Men) by Don Gillis, 1940–41
- Symphony No. 3 (Glass) by Philip Glass, 1995
- Symphony No. 3 (Glazunov) in D major (Op. 33) by Alexander Glazunov, 1890
- Symphony No. 3 (Glière) in B minor (Op. 42, Ilya Muromets) by Reinhold Glière, 1911
- Symphony No. 3 (Goeb) by Roger Goeb, 1950
- Symphony No. 3 (Górecki) (Op. 36, Symphony of Sorrowful Songs) by Henryk Górecki, 1976
- Symphony No. 3 (Guarnieri) by Camargo Guarnieri, 1952
- Symphony No. 3 (Hanson) by Howard Hanson, 1936–38
- Symphony No. 3 (Harbison) by John Harbison, 1991
- Symphony No. 3 (Harris) by Roy Harris, 1939
- Symphony No. 3 (Harrison) by Lou Harrison, 1982
- Symphony No. 3 (Hartmann) by Karl Amadeus Hartmann, 1948–49
- Symphony No. 3 (Haydn) in G major (Hoboken I/3) by Joseph Haydn, 1760–62
- Symphony No. 3 (Michael Haydn) in G major (Sherman 3, MH 26, Divertimento) by Michael Haydn, 1763
- Symphony No. 3 (Henze) by Hans Werner Henze, 1949–50
- Symphony No. 3 (Honegger) (Liturgique) by Arthur Honegger, 1945–46
- Symphony No. 3 (Hovhaness) (Op. 148) by Alan Hovhaness, 1956
- Symphony No. 3 (Ichiyanagi) (Inner Communications) by Toshi Ichiyanagi, 1995
- Symphony No. 3 (Imbrie) by Andrew Imbrie, c.1973
- Symphony No. 3 (Ince) (Siege of Vienna) by Kamran Ince, 1995
- Symphony No. 3 (Ives) (S. 3, K. 1A3,The Camp Meeting) by Charles Ives, 1908–10
- Symphony No. 3 (Kabalevsky) (Op. 22, Requiem) by Dmitry Kabalevsky, 1933
- Symphony No. 3 (Khachaturian) (Symphony–Poem) by Aram Khachaturian, 1947
- Symphony No. 3 (Kilar) (September Symphony) by Wojciech Kilar, 2003
- Symphony No. 3 (Killmayer) (Menschen-Los) by Wilhelm Killmayer, 1972–88
- Symphony No. 3 (Krenek) (Op. 16) by Ernst Krenek, 1922
- Symphony No. 3 (Lilburn) by Douglas Lilburn, 1961
- Symphony No. 3 (Lloyd) by George Lloyd, 1933
- Symphony No. 3 (Lutosławski) by Witold Lutosławski, 1973–83
- Symphony No. 3 (Lyatoshynsky) in B minor by Borys Lyatoshynsky, 1951
- Symphony No. 3 (MacMillan) (Silence) by James MacMillan, 2003
- Symphony No. 3 (Madetoja) in A major (Op. 55) by Leevi Madetoja, 1925–26
- Symphony No. 3 (Magnard) in B-flat minor (Op. 11) by Albéric Magnard, 1895–96
- Symphony No. 3 (Mahler) by Gustav Mahler, 1896
- Symphony No. 3 (Malipiero) by Gian Francesco Malipiero, 1945
- Symphony No. 3 (Marco) by Tomás Marco, 1985
- Symphony No. 3 (Martinů) (H. 299) by Bohuslav Martinů, 1944
- Symphony No. 3 (Melartin) in F major (Op. 40) by Erkki Melartin, 1906–07
- Symphony No. 3 (Mendelssohn) in A minor (Op. 56, Scottish) by Felix Mendelssohn, 1829–42
- Symphony No. 3 (Mennin) by Peter Mennin, 1946
- Symphony No. 3 (Milhaud) (Op. 271 Te Deum) by Darius Milhaud, 1946
- Symphony No. 3 (Mozart) in E-flat major (K. 18), now attributed to Carl Friedrich Abel, c. 1764
- Symphony No. 3 (Myaskovsky) in A minor (Op. 15) by Nikolai Myaskovsky, 1914
- Symphony No. 3 (Natra) by Sergiu Natra
- Symphony No. 3 (Nielsen) (Op. 27, FS 60, Espansiva) by Carl Nielsen, 1910–11
- Symphony No. 3 (Nørgård) by Per Nørgård, 1972–75
- Symphony No. 3 (Panufnik) (Sacra) by Andrzej Panufnik, 1963
- Symphony No. 3 (Pärt) by Arvo Pärt, 1971
- Symphony No. 3 (Penderecki) by Krzysztof Penderecki, 1988–95
- Symphony No. 3 (Piston) Walter Piston, 1946–47
- Symphony No. 3 (Popov) (Heroic or Spanish) by Gavriil Popov, 1939–46
- Symphony No. 3 (Price) in C minor by Florence Price, 1938–40
- Symphony No. 3 (Prokofiev) in C minor (Op. 44) by Sergei Prokofiev, 1928
- Symphony No. 3 (Rachmaninoff) in A minor (Op. 44) by Sergei Rachmaninoff, 1935–36
- Symphony No. 3 (Raff) in F major (Im Walde) by Joachim Raff, 1869
- Symphony No. 3 (Rautavaara) by Einojuhani Rautavaara, 1959–60
- Symphony No. 3 (Riegger) (Op. 42) by Wallingford Riegger, 1946–47
- Symphony No. 3 (Rochberg) by George Rochberg, 1966–69
- Symphony No. 3 (Rorem) by Ned Rorem, 1959
- Symphony No. 3 (Rouse) by Christopher Rouse, 2011
- Symphony No. 3 (Roussel) in G minor (Op. 42) by Albert Roussel, 1929–30
- Symphony No. 3 (Rubbra) (Op. 49) by Edmund Rubbra, 1938-39
- Symphony No. 3 (Saint-Saëns) in C minor (Op. 78, Organ) by Camille Saint-Saëns, 1866
- Symphony No. 3 (Sallinen) (Op. 35) by Aulis Sallinen, 1974–75
- Symphony No. 3 (Say) (Universe) by Fazıl Say, 2012
- Symphony No. 3 (Scherber) in B minor by Martin Scherber, 1952–55
- Symphony No. 3 (Schnittke) by Alfred Schnittke, 1981
- Symphony No. 3 (Schubert) in D major (D. 200) by Franz Schubert, 1815
- Symphony No. 3 (Schuman) by William Schuman, 1941
- Symphony No. 3 (Schumann) in E-flat major (Op. 97, Rhenish) by Robert Schumann, 1850
- Symphony No. 3 (Scriabin) in C minor (Op. 43, The Divine Poem) by Alexander Scriabin, 1902–04
- Symphony No. 3 (Sessions) by Roger Sessions, 1957
- Symphony No. 3 (Shostakovich) in E-flat major (Op. 20, The First of May) by Dmitri Shostakovich, 1930
- Symphony No. 3 (Sibelius) in C major (Op. 52) by Jean Sibelius, 1907
- Symphony No. 3 (Simpson) by Robert Simpson, 1962
- Symphony No. 3 (Spohr) in C minor (Op. 78) by Louis Spohr
- Symphony No. 3 (Szymanowski) (Op. 27, Song of the Night) by Karol Szymanowski, 1914–16
- Symphony No. 3 (Tchaikovsky) in D major (Op. 29, Polish) by Pyotr Ilyich Tchaikovsky, 1875
- Symphony No. 3 (Tippett) by Michael Tippett, 1970–72
- Symphony No. 3 (Toch) (Op. 75) by Ernst Toch, 1955
- Symphony No. 3 (Tubin) in D minor (Heroic) by Eduard Tubin, 1940–42
- Symphony No. 3 (Ustvolskaya) (Jesus Messiah, Save Us) by Galina Ustvolskaya, 1983
- Symphony No. 3 (Valen) (Op. 41) by Fartein Valen, 1944–46
- Symphony No. 3 (Vaughan Williams) (Pastoral) by Ralph Vaughan Williams, 1922
- Symphony No. 3 (Vieru) (Earthquake) by Anatol Vieru, 1978
- Symphony No. 3 (Villa-Lobos) (War) by Heitor Villa-Lobos, 1913
- Symphony No. 3 (Wagenaar) by Bernard Wagenaar, 1936
- Symphony No. 3 (Williams) in F major (Op.58. The Sacred Forest) by Alberto Williams, 1911
- Symphony No. 3 (Williamson) (The Icy Mirror) by Malcolm Williamson, 1972
