= Symphony No. 3 in E-flat major =

Symphony No. 3 in E-flat Major may refer to:

- Symphony No. 3 in E-flat major, Op. 4, WK 9, by Carl Friedrich Abel
- Symphony No. 3 (Beethoven) the Eroica
- Symphony No. 3 (Dvořák)
- Symphony No. 3 (Mozart) now considered to be the work of Carl Friedrich Abel, being his Symphony No. 6
- Symphony No. 3, Op. 90 (1813) by Ferdinand Ries
- Symphony No. 3 (Schumann), Op. 97, the Rhenish symphony
- Symphony No. 3 (Shostakovich), Op. 20, The First of May
- Symphony in E-flat major, Op. 11, No. 3 (Stamitz)
- Symphony No. 3, Op. 14 (by 1809) by Johann Wilhelm Wilms

== See also ==
- List of symphonies in E-flat major
