= Symphony No. 4 =

Symphony No. 4 may refer to:

- Symphony No. 4 (Abel) (Op. 1, WK 4) by Carl Friedrich Abel
- Symphony No. 4 (Aho) by Kalevi Aho (1972–3)
- Symphony No. 4 (Alwyn) by William Alwyn, 1959
- Symphony No. 4 (Arnold) by Malcolm Arnold, 1960
- Symphony No. 4 (Atterberg) in G minor, Op. 14 by Kurt Atterberg, 1917-8 (later revised?)
- Symphony No. 4 (Berkeley) by Lennox Berkeley (1977–78)
- Symphony No. 4 (Bax) by Arnold Bax, 1930
- Symphony No. 4 (Beethoven) in B♭ major (Op. 60) by Ludwig van Beethoven, 1807
- Symphony No. 4 (Berwald) in E♭ (Sinfonie naïve) by Franz Berwald, 1845
- Symphony No. 4 (Brahms) in E minor (Op. 98) by Johannes Brahms, 1885
- Symphony No. 4 (Brian) (Das Siegeslied) by Havergal Brian, 1932–33
- Symphony No. 4 (Bruckner) in E♭ major (Romantic) by Anton Bruckner, 1874
- Symphony No. 4 (Cartellieri) by Antonio Casimir Cartellieri
- Symphony No. 4 (Chávez) (Sinfonía romántica) by Carlos Chávez, 1953
- Symphony No. 4 (Ching) in G minor (Souvenir des Ming), by Jeffrey Ching, 2002
- Symphony No. 4 (Creston) (Op. 52) by Paul Creston, 1951
- Symphony No. 4 (Davies) by Peter Maxwell Davies, 1989
- Symphony No. 4 (Diamond) by David Diamond, 1945
- Symphony No. 4 (Draeseke) in E minor (WoO 38, Symphonia Comica) by Felix Draeseke, 1912
- Symphony No. 4 (Dvořák) in D minor (Op. 13, B. 41) by Antonín Dvořák, 1874
- Symphony No. 4 (Enescu) in E minor, by George Enescu 1928–34, unfinished, completed by and Pascal Bentoiu 1996
- Symphony No. 4 (Ficher) (Op. 60) by Jacobo Ficher, 1946
- Symphony No. 4 (Franz Schmidt) by Franz Schmidt, 1933
- Symphony No. 4 (Glass) (Heroes) by Philip Glass, 1996
- Symphony No. 4 (Glazunov) in E♭ major (Op. 48) by Alexander Glazunov, 1893
- Symphony No. 4 (Guarnieri) (Brasília) by Camargo Guarnieri, 1963
- Symphony No. 4 (Hanson) (Op. 34, Requiem) by Howard Hanson, 1943
- Symphony No. 4 (Harbison) by John Harbison, 2004
- Symphony No. 4 (Hartmann) for string orchestra, by Karl Amadeus Hartmann, 1946–47
- Symphony No. 4 (Haydn) in D major (Hoboken I/4) by Joseph Haydn, 1757–61
- Symphony No. 4 (Michael Haydn) in B♭ major (Perger 51, Sherman 4, MH 62) by Michael Haydn, 1763
- Symphony No. 4 (Henze) by Hans Werner Henze, 1955
- Symphony No. 4 (Hill) in C minor (The Pursuit of Happiness), by Alfred Hill, 1954–55
- Symphony No. 4 (Honegger) by Arthur Honegger, 1946
- Symphony No. 4 (Hovhaness) (Op. 165) by Alan Hovhaness, 1957
- Symphony No. 4 (Ives) (S. 4, K. 1A4) by Charles Ives, 1910–24
- Symphony No. 4 (Karetnikov) (Op. 17) by Nikolai Karetnikov, 1963
- Symphony No. 4 (Kernis) by Aaron Jay Kernis, 2018
- Symphony No. 4 (Lutosławski) by Witold Lutosławski, 1988–92
- Symphony No. 4 (MacMillan) by James MacMillan, 2015
- Symphony No. 4 (Magnard) in C♯ minor (Op. 21) by Albéric Magnard, 1913
- Symphony No. 4 (Mahler) in G major, by Gustav Mahler, 1899–1900
- Symphony No. 4 (Martins) (Buddha Dharma) by Vasco Martins, 2001
- Symphony No. 4 (Martinů) (H. 305) by Bohuslav Martinů, 1945
- Symphony No. 4 (Melartin) (Op. 80, Summer Symphony) by Erkki Melartin, 1912
- Symphony No. 4 (Mendelssohn) in A major (Op. 90, Italian) by Felix Mendelssohn, 1833
- Symphony No. 4 (Mennin) ("The Cycle") by Peter Mennin, 1947–48
- Symphony No. 4 (Milhaud) (Op. 281), by Darius Milhaud, 1947
- Symphony No. 4 (Mozart) in D major (K. 19) by Wolfgang Amadeus Mozart, 1765
- Symphony No. 4 (Natra) by Sergiu Natra
- Symphony No. 4 (Nielsen) (Op. 29, FS 76, The Inextinguishable) by Carl Nielsen, 1916
- Symphony No. 4 (Panufnik) (Sinfonia Concertante) by Andrzej Panufnik, 1973
- Symphony No. 4 (Pärt) (Los Angeles) by Arvo Pärt, 2008
- Symphony No. 4 (Penderecki) (Adagio) by Krzysztof Penderecki, 1989
- Symphony No. 4 (Piston) by Walter Piston, 1950
- Symphony No. 4 (Prieto) (Martín y Soler) by Claudio Prieto, 2006
- Symphony No. 4 (Prokofiev) (Op. 47/112) by Sergei Prokofiev, 1929 and 1947
- Symphony No. 4 (Raff) in G minor (Op. 167) by Joachim Raff, 1871
- Symphony No. 4 (Rautavaara) (Arabescata) by Einojuhani Rautavaara, 1962
- Symphony No. 4 (Rochberg), by George Rochberg, 1976
- Symphony No. 4 (Rouse) by Christopher Rouse, 2013
- Symphony No. 4 (Rubbra) (Op. 53) by Edmund Rubbra, 1942
- Symphony No. 4 (Sallinen) (Op. 49) by Aulis Sallinen, 1978–79
- Symphony No. 4 (Schnittke) by Alfred Schnittke, 1983
- Symphony No. 4 (Schubert) in C minor (D. 417, Tragic) by Franz Schubert, 1816
- Symphony No. 4 (Schuman) by William Schuman, 1942
- Symphony No. 4 (Schumann) in D minor (Op. 120) by Robert Schumann, 1841
- Symphony No. 4 (Scriabin) (Op. 54, The Poem of Ecstasy) by Alexander Scriabin, 1905–08
- Symphony No. 4 (Sessions) by Roger Sessions, 1958
- Symphony No. 4 (Shostakovich) in C minor (Op. 43) by Dmitri Shostakovich, 1935–36
- Symphony No. 4 (Sibelius) in A minor (Op. 63) by Jean Sibelius, 1910–11
- Symphony No. 4 (Simpson) in E♭ by Robert Simpson, 1970–72
- Symphony No. 4 (Szymanowski) (Op. 60, Symphonie concertante) by Karol Szymanowski, 1932
- Symphony No. 4 (Tansman) in C♯ minor by Alexander Tansman, 1936–39
- Symphony No. 4 (Tchaikovsky) in F minor (Op. 36) by Pyotr Ilyich Tchaikovsky, 1877–78
- Symphony No. 4 (Tippett) by Michael Tippett, 1977
- Symphony No. 4 (Ustvolskaya) (Prayer) by Galina Ustvolskaya, 1985–87
- Symphony No. 4 (Vaughan Williams) in F minor by Ralph Vaughan Williams, 1935
- Symphony No. 4 (Villa-Lobos) (A victória) by Heitor Villa-Lobos, 1919
- Symphony No. 4 (Weinberg) in A minor, Op. 61 by Mieczysław Weinberg, 1957 (rev. 1961?)
- Symphony No. 4 (Williamson) (Jubilee) by Malcolm Williamson, 1977
