= Symphony No. 4 in E-flat major =

Symphony No. 4 in E-flat Major may refer to:

- Carl Friedrich Abel's Symphony op. 1 no. 4/WK (Walter Knape) 4
- Arnold Bax's Symphony No. 4 in E-flat (1931, Parlett no. 307)
- Anton Bruckner's Symphony No. 4 "Romantic" (1874) (WAB 104)
- Antonio Casimir Cartellieri's Symphony No. 4
- Alexander Glazunov's Symphony No. 4, op. 48 (1893)

== See also ==
- List of symphonies in E-flat major
