= Symphony No. 6 =

Symphony No. 6 may refer to:

- Symphony No. 6 (Arnold) (Op. 95) by Malcolm Arnold, 1967
- Symphony No. 6 (Bax) (Parlett 331) by Arnold Bax, 1935
- Symphony No. 6 (Beethoven) in F major (Op. 68, Pastoral) by Ludwig van Beethoven, 1802–08
- Symphony No. 6 (Bentoiu) (Op. 28, Culori) by Pascal Bentoiu, 1985
- Symphony No. 6 (Branca) (Op. 95, Devil Choirs at the Gates of Heaven) by Glenn Branca, 1989
- Symphony No. 6 (Brian) (Sinfonia Tragica) by Havergal Brian, 1948
- Symphony No. 6 (Bruckner) in A major (WAB 106) by Anton Bruckner, 1879–81
- Symphony No. 6 (Chávez) by Carlos Chávez, 1961–62
- Symphony No. 6 (Davies) by Peter Maxwell Davies, 1996
- Symphony No. 6 (Diamond) by David Diamond, 1951
- Symphony No. 6 (Dvořák) in D major (Op. 60, B. 112) by Antonín Dvořák, 1880
- Symphony No. 6 (Ficher) (Op. 86) by Jacobo Ficher, 1956
- Symphony No. 6 (Glass) (Plutonian Ode) by Philip Glass, 2002
- Symphony No. 6 (Glazunov) in C minor (Op. 58) by Alexander Glazunov, 1896
- Symphony No. 6 (Hanson) by Howard Hanson, 1967
- Symphony No. 6 (Harbison) by John Harbison, 2011
- Symphony No. 6 (Harris) (Gettysburg Address') by Roy Harris, 1943–44
- Symphony No. 6 (Haydn) in D major (Hoboken 1/6, Le matin) by Joseph Haydn, 1761
- Symphony No. 6 (Michael Haydn) in C major (Perger 4, Sherman 6, MH 64) by Michael Haydn, 1764
- Symphony No. 6 (Henze) by Hans Werner Henze, 1969
- Symphony No. 6 (Hovhaness) (Op. 173, Celestial Gate) by Alan Hovhaness, 1959
- Symphony No. 6 (Mahler) in A minor (Tragic) by Gustav Mahler, 1903–04
- Symphony No. 6 (Martinů) (H. 343, Fantaisies symphoniques) by Bohuslav Martinů, 1951–53
- Symphony No. 6 (Melartin) (Op. 100) by Erkki Melartin, 1918–24
- Symphony No. 6 (Mennin) by Peter Mennin, 1953
- Symphony No. 6 (Milhaud) (Op. 343) by Darius Milhaud, 1955
- Symphony No. 6 (Mozart) in F major (K. 43) by Wolfgang Amadeus Mozart, 1767
- Symphony No. 6 (Myaskovsky) in E flat minor (Op. 23) by Nikolai Myaskovsky, 1921–23
- Symphony No. 6 (Nielsen) (FS 116, Sinfonia semplice) by Carl Nielsen, 1924–25
- Symphony No. 6 (Penderecki) (Chinese Poems) by Krzysztof Penderecki, 2008–17
- Symphony No. 6 (Piston) by Walter Piston, 1955
- Symphony No. 6 (Prokofiev) in E-flat minor (Op. 111) by Sergei Prokofiev, 1947
- Symphony No. 6 (Raff) in D minor (Op. 189, Gelebt, Gestrebt, Gelitten, Gestritten, Gestorben, Umworben) by Joachim Raff
- Symphony No. 6 (Rautavaara) (Vincentiana) by Einojuhani Rautavaara, 1986–87
- Symphony No. 6 (Rochberg) by George Rochberg, 1986–87
- Symphony No. 6 (Rouse) by Christopher Rouse, 2019
- Symphony No. 6 (Rubbra) (Op. 80) by Edmund Rubbra
- Symphony No. 6 (Sallinen) (Op. 65) by Aulis Sallinen, 1990
- Symphony No. 6 (Schnittke) by Alfred Schnittke, 1992
- Symphony No. 6 (Schubert) in C major (D. 589, Little C major) by Franz Schubert, 1817–18
- Symphony No. 6 (Schuman) by William Schuman, 1949
- Symphony No. 6 (Sessions) by Roger Sessions, 1966
- Symphony No. 6 (Shostakovich) in B minor (Op. 54) by Dmitri Shostakovich, 1939
- Symphony No. 6 (Sibelius) in D minor (Op. 104) by Jean Sibelius, 1918–23
- Symphony No. 6 (Simpson) by Robert Simpson, 1977
- Symphony No. 6 (Tchaikovsky) in B minor (Op. 74, Pathetique) by Pyotr Ilyich Tchaikovsky, 1893
- Symphony No. 6 (Vaughan Williams) by Ralph Vaughan Williams, 1946–47
- Symphony No. 6 (Vieru) (Exodus) by Anatol Vieru, 1989
- Symphony No. 6 (Villa-Lobos) (Sobre a linha das montanhas do Brasil) by Heitor Villa-Lobos, 1944
- Symphony No. 6 (Williamson) (A Liturgy of Homage) by Malcolm Williamson, 1982
- Symphony No. 6 (Langgaard) (The Heaven-rending) by Rued Langgaard, 1919–20
