= K18 =

K18 may refer to:

- K-18 (Kansas highway)
- Keratin 18
- Symphony No. 3 (Mozart), once attributed to Wolfgang Amadeus Mozart
- Soviet submarine K-222, originally designated K-18
