= Symphony No. 8 =

Symphony No. 8 may refer to:

- Symphony No. 8 (Arnold)
- Symphony No. 8 (Beethoven)
- Symphony No. 8 (Bruckner)
- Symphony No. 8 (Davies), "Antarctic" Symphony
- Symphony No. 8 (Diamond), by David Diamond, 1958–1960
- Symphony No. 8 (Dvořák)
- Symphony No. 8, Op. 105 (1965), a symphony by Jacobo Ficher
- Symphony No. 8 (Glass)
- Symphony No. 8 (Glazunov)
- Symphony No. 8 (Haydn), "Le Soir"
- Symphony No. 8 (Michael Haydn)
- Symphony No. 8 (Henze)
- Symphony No. 8 (Hovhaness), a symphony with a name
- Symphony No. 8 (Kabeláč), "Antiphonies"
- Symphony No. 8 (Mahler), "Symphony of a Thousand"
- Symphony No. 8, Op. 186 (1936–37), a symphony by Erkki Melartin
- Symphony No. 8, a symphony by Peter Mennin
- Symphony No. 8 (Milhaud)
- Symphony No. 8 (Mozart)
- Symphony No. 8 (Myaskovsky)
- Symphony No. 8 (Penderecki), "Lieder der Vergänglichkeit"
- Symphony No. 8 (Pettersson), a symphony by Allan Pettersson
- Symphony No. 8 (Piston)
- Symphony No. 8 (Rautavaara), "The Journey"
- Symphony No. 8 (Rubbra), a symphony with a name
- Symphony No. 8 (Sallinen)
- Symphony No. 8 (Schnittke), a symphony by Alfred Schnittke
- Symphony No. 8 (Schubert), "Unfinished"
- Symphony No. 8, a symphony by William Schuman
- Symphony No. 8 (Sessions)
- Symphony No. 8 (Shostakovich)
- Symphony No. 8 (Sibelius)
- Symphony No. 8 (Simpson)
- Symphony No. 8 (Vaughan Williams)
- Symphony No. 8 (Villa-Lobos)

== See also ==
- Symphony No. 9 (Schubert) in C major (D 944), 1824-26, known as The Great and another symphony called Symphony No. 8 by Franz Schubert
