= Symphony No. 7 =

Symphony No. 7 may refer to:

== Symphonies ==
- Symphony No. 7 (Arnold) (Op. 113) by Malcolm Arnold, 1973
- Symphony No. 7 (Bax) by Arnold Bax, 1939
- Symphony No. 7 (Beethoven) in A major (Op. 92) by Ludwig van Beethoven, 1811–12
- Symphony No. 7 (Bruckner) in E major (WAB 107) by Anton Bruckner, 1881–83
- Symphony No. 7 (Davies) by Peter Maxwell Davies, 2000
- Symphony No. 7 (Diamond) by David Diamond, 1957
- Symphony No. 7 (Dvořák) in D minor (Op. 70, B. 141) by Antonín Dvořák, 1885
- Symphony No. 7 (Ficher) (Op. 92, Epopeya de mayo) by Jacobo Ficher, 1958–59
- Symphony No. 7 (Glass) (Toltec) by Philip Glass, 2005
- Symphony No. 7 (Glazunov) in F major (Op. 77, Pastoral) by Alexander Glazunov, 1902
- Symphony No. 7 (Hanson) (A Sea Symphony) by Howard Hanson, 1974
- Symphony No. 7 (Haydn) in C major (Hoboken I/7, Le Midi) by Joseph Haydn, 1761
- Symphony No. 7 (Michael Haydn) in E major (Perger 5, Sherman 7, MH 65) by Michael Haydn, 1764
- Symphony No. 7 (Henze) by Hans Werner Henze, 1983–84
- Symphony No. 7 (Hovhaness) (Op. 178, Nanga Parvat) by Alan Hovhaness, 1959
- Symphony No. 7 (Mahler) (Song of the Night) by Gustav Mahler, 1904–05
- Symphony No. 7 (Melartin) (Op. 149, Sinfonia Gaia), by Erkki Melartin, 1935–36 (unfinished)
- Symphony No. 7 (Milhaud) (Op. 344) by Darius Milhaud, 1955
- Symphony No. 7 (Mozart) in D major (K. 45) by Wolfgang Amadeus Mozart, 1768
- Symphony No. 7 (Penderecki) (Seven Gates of Jerusalem) by Krzysztof Penderecki, 1996
- Symphony No. 7 (Piston) by Walter Piston, 1960
- Symphony No. 7 (Prokofiev) in C-sharp minor (Op. 131) by Sergei Prokofiev, 1952
- Symphony No. 7 (Rautavaara) (Angel of Light) by Einojuhani Rautavaara, 1994
- Symphony No. 7 (Ries) in A minor (Op. 181) by Ferdinand Ries, 1835
- Symphony No. 7 (Rubbra) in C (Op. 88) by Edmund Rubbra
- Symphony No. 7 (Schnittke) by Alfred Schnittke, 1993
- Symphony No. 7 (Schubert) in E major (D 729) by Franz Schubert, 1821
- Symphony No. 7 (Schuman) by William Schuman, 1960
- Symphony No. 7 (Sessions) by Roger Sessions, 1967
- Symphony No. 7 (Shostakovich) in C major (Op. 60, Leningrad) by Dmitri Shostakovich, c. 1939–40
- Symphony No. 7 (Sibelius) in C major (Op. 105) by Jean Sibelius, 1924
- Symphony No. 7 (Simpson) by Robert Simpson, 1977
- Symphony No. 7 (Tchaikovsky) in E-flat sketched by Pyotr Ilyich Tchaikovsky, c. 1892, reconstructed 1951–55
- Symphony No. 7 (Vaughan Williams) (Sinfonia antartica) by Ralph Vaughan Williams, 1949–52
- Symphony No. 7 (Villa-Lobos) (Odysséia da paz) by Heitor Villa-Lobos, 1945
- Symphony No. 7 (Williamson) by Malcolm Williamson, 1984

== Other uses ==
- 7th Symphony (album) by Apocalyptica, 2010

== See also ==
- Symphony No. 7a (Mozart) in G major (K. Anh. 221/45a Old Lambach) probably by Wolfgang Amadeus Mozart, 1766–67
- Other symphonies called Symphony No. 7 by Franz Schubert
  - Symphony No. 8 (Schubert) in B minor (D 759), 1822, known as the Unfinished Symphony
  - Symphony No. 9 (Schubert) in C major (D 944), 1824-26, known as The Great
