= Symphony No. 36 =

Symphony No. 36 may refer to:

- Symphony No. 36 (Haydn), composed by Joseph Haydn in the first half of the 1760s
- Symphony No. 36 (Michael Haydn), composed by Michael Haydn in 1788
- Symphony No. 36 (Mozart), composed by Wolfgang Amadeus Mozart in late 1783
