= Symphony, K. 45a (Mozart) =

1766 symphony by Wolfgang Amadeus Mozart

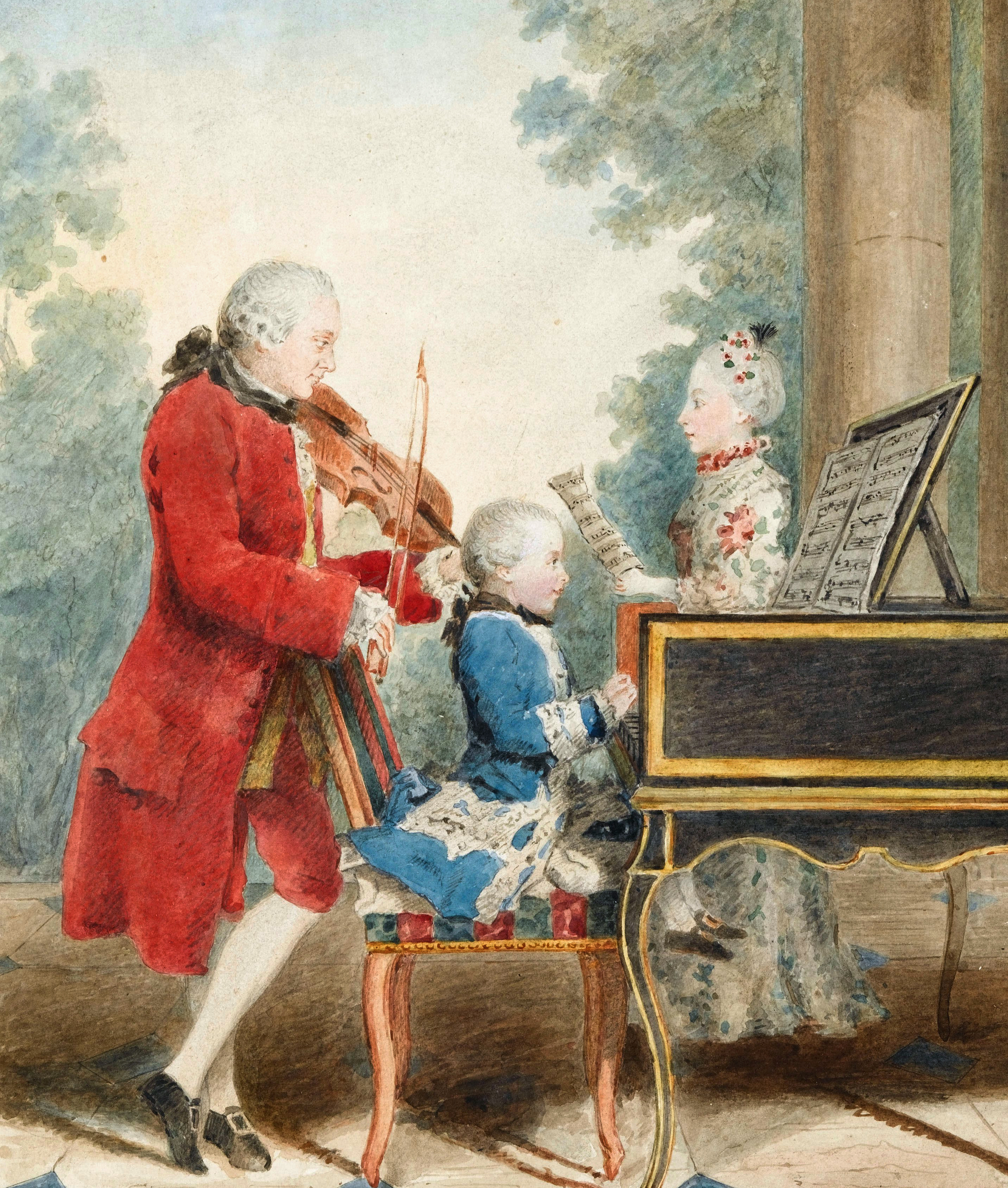
Detail of Carmontelle's Mozart family watercolour

The Symphony in G major "Old Lambach", K. Anh. 221/45a, was probably written by Wolfgang Amadeus Mozart during 1766 in The Hague and revised in 1767. Both versions – the original and the revision – have survived.

The symphony is scored for two oboes, two horns and strings. In contemporary orchestras, it was also usual to include bassoons and harpsichord if they were available in the orchestra to reinforce the bass line and act as the continuo. The duration is approximately 14 minutes.

The symphony consists of the following movements:

1. Allegro maestoso, 4/4
2. Andante, 2/4
3. Presto (Molto allegro in the first version), 3/8

== History and attribution ==
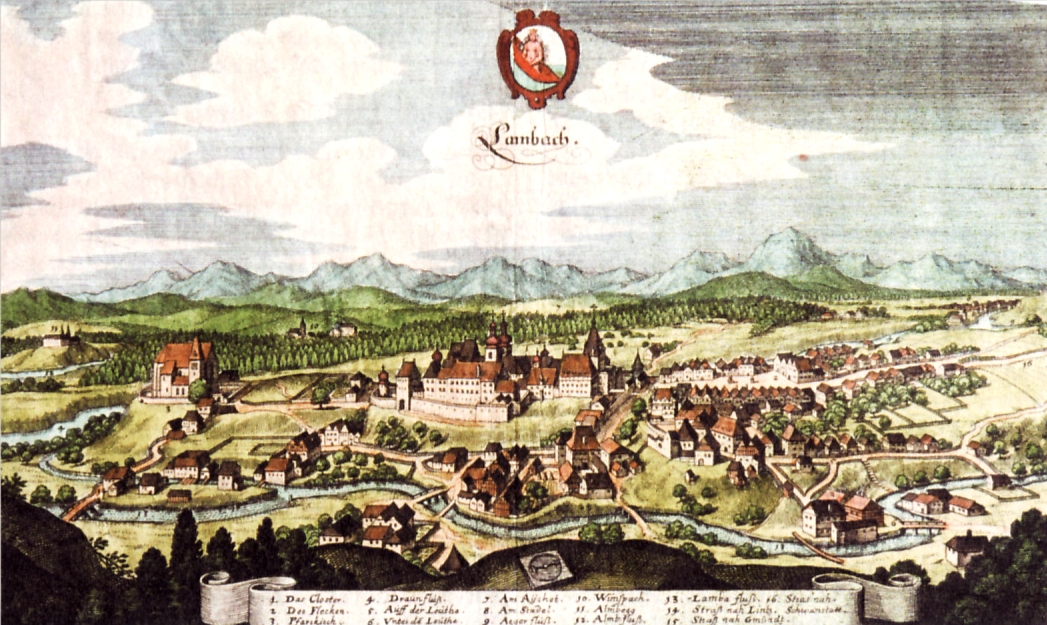
Lambach Abbey and surroundings, by Matthäus Merian, 1649

The Mozart family began their journey between Salzburg and Vienna in January 1769, stopping over at the Lambach Abbey in Upper Austria, among other places. As was customary for Bavarian and Austrian monasteries, the Lambach Abbey offered rooms and meals for travellers and maintained a small chapel for both the liturgy and entertainment. This stopover is not mentioned in the correspondence of the Mozart family and is only known through the two manuscripts in the monastery.

These two manuscripts were found at the beginning of the 20th century as copies (not autographs) in the archives of the Lambach Abbey and were probably gifts from the Mozart family as thanks for the hospitality given to them. One (the "Old Lambach") had the title "Del Sigre: Wolfgango Mozart. Dono Authoris 4.ta Jan. [1]769" while the other (the "New Lambach", K. Anh. C 11.17, Eisen G 16) was attributed to "Leopoldo" with the same date. Alfred Einstein assumed that the "Old Lambach" symphony (the one attributed to Wolfgang) was composed by 1767-68 during the stay in Vienna (which fit with the date on the manuscript in Lambach) and entered it into the main Köchel catalogue as K. 45a. This analysis was repeated in later editions of the Köchel catalogue. (The previous editions numbered the work as K. Anh. 221 as the work was then unknown apart from an incipit in the catalogue of Breitkopf & Härtel.)

In 1964, Anna Amalie Abert published a new hypothesis that the title pages of the two Lambach symphonies were accidentally reversed. Her theory was based on an extensive examination of both works, as well as comparisons between these and other symphonies known to be composed by Leopold and Wolfgang at about the same time. As a result, Abert concluded that K. 45a is archaic in style and, from an aesthetic point, "less good" symphony of Leopold, who must have been the composer of the older, more conservative and less gifted K. 45a. Moreover, the comparison revealed similarities between formal and stylistic characteristics of the first movements of K. 45a and other symphonies by Leopold, and the first movements of "New Lambach" and other symphonies by Wolfgang. Furthermore, the fact that the first movement has only one theme and the large use of two-bar phrases making up sequences make it more likely to be written by Leopold, while the more continuous, spun and varied melodic ideas of the "New Lambach" symphony make it more likely to be written by Wolfgang. After this, the "New Lambach" symphony was subsequently published as a work of Mozart and was recorded as part of some complete recordings of Mozart's symphonies (most notably in The Complete Mozart Edition).

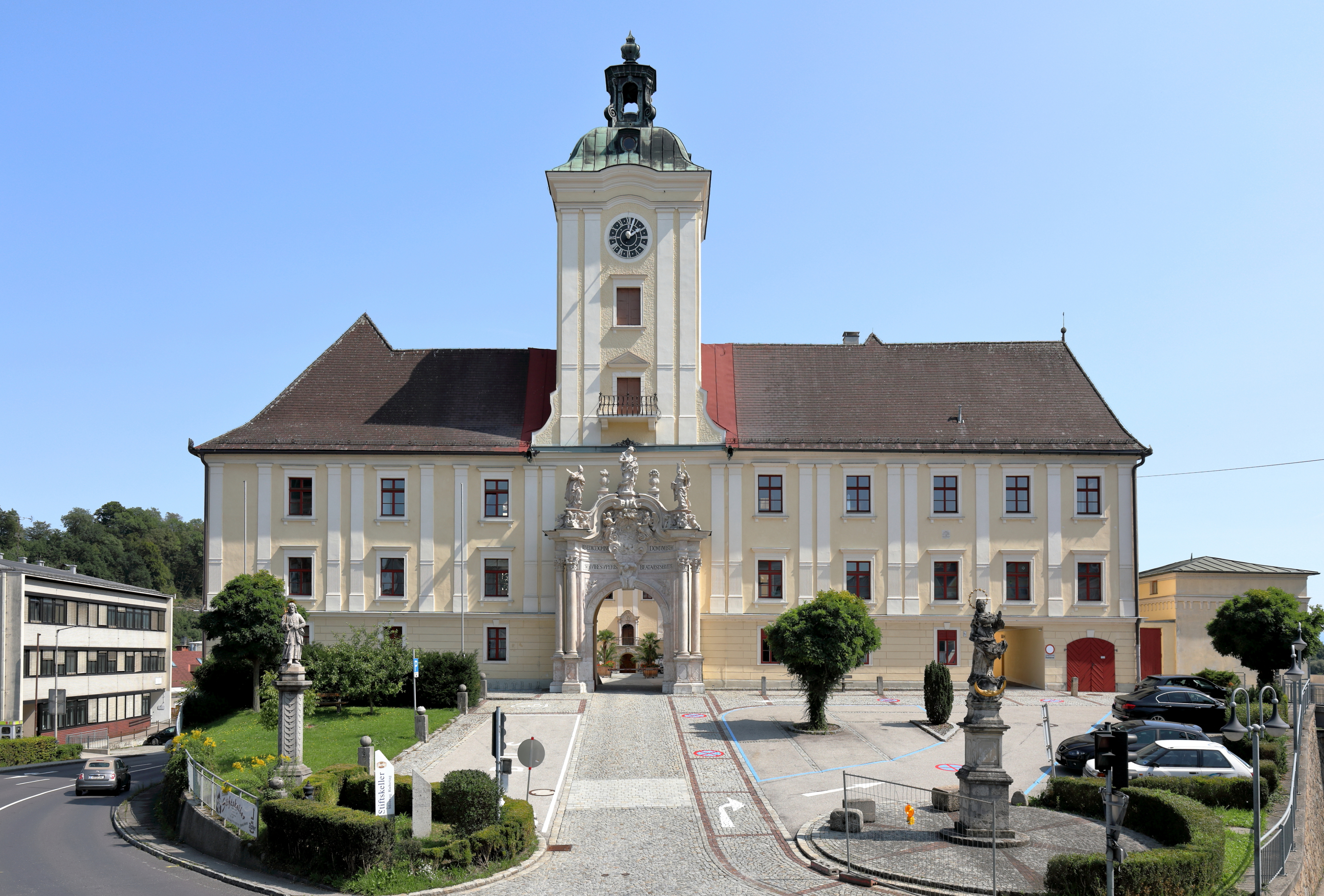
Lambach Abbey

However, Zaslaw argues that the original assignment was correct, for the following reasons:

- The more continuous melodic ideas of the "New Lambach" symphony is a common feature of the late Baroque, whereas the two-bar phrases of the "Old Lambach" pointed more to the more modern (at the time) galant style.
- The two manuscripts were copied by the Salzburg copyists Estlinger, implying that they must have been composed in Salzburg before the Mozarts left for Vienna in September 1767. However, the earlier the symphonies are dated, the more understandable Wolfgang's "archaic style" becomes.
- On the Mozart family's travels, Wolfgang learnt a lot of musical styles, and later Wolfgang (rightly) claimed that he could compose in any style.
- Ascribing the "Old Lambach" symphony to Leopold due to it being "less good" and "less gifted" underestimates Leopold's ability as a composer.
- As the contemporary Mozart symphonies No. 6, No. 7 and No. 8 were all not composed in Vienna, it seems doubtful that this symphony was composed in Vienna.
- It is unlikely that the pedantic Leopold would have accepted the Salzburg copyists' accidental interchanging of the title pages, used the symphony for concerts and finally donated the manuscripts to the Lambach Abbey (where a monk could have subsequently written the date "1769") without correcting the error at some point.
- In 1767, Leopold copied six early symphonies of Wolfgang and sent them to Prince Wenzel in Donaueschingen. K. 45a was probably among these six.

In February 1982, the original orchestral parts of K. 45a (in the handwriting of Leopold, Wolfgang's sister Nannerl and an unknown copyist) were discovered in the Bavarian State Library in Munich. Leopold wrote "à la Haye 1766" on the front page next to Wolfgang's name. This implies that K. 45a was composed by Wolfgang during their stay in The Hague, possibly for the inauguration of William V, Prince of Orange on 11 March 1766. The Mozarts then took the symphony along with them on their journeys; Wolfgang revised the symphony along the way by making a few changes, especially in the inner voices.
