= Symphony No. 6 in F major =

Symphony No. 6 in F Major may refer to:

- Symphony No. 6 (Beethoven), the Pastoral Symphony
- Symphony No. 6 op. 132 (published 1845), by Jan Kalivoda
- Symphony No. 6, K. 43 by Mozart

== See also ==
- List of symphonies in F major
