= Symphony No. 19 =

Symphony No. 19 can refer to:

- Symphony No. 19 (Mozart)
- Symphony No. 19 (Haydn)
- Symphony No. 19 (Michael Haydn)
