= Symphony No. 9 in D minor =

Symphony No. 9 in D minor may refer to:

- Symphony No. 9 (Beethoven), Op. 125 (1824) by Ludwig van Beethoven
- Symphony No. 9 (Bruckner) (1887–1896, unfinished, first performed in 1903) by Anton Bruckner

== See also ==
- Symphony No. 9 (disambiguation)
- List of symphonies in D minor
