= Symphony No. 11 =

Symphony No. 11 may refer to:

- Symphony No. 11 (Brian) in B-flat minor by Havergal Brian, 1954
- Symphony No. 11 (Diamond) by David Diamond, 1989–1991
- Symphony No. 11 (Glass) by Philip Glass, 2016
- Symphony No. 11 (Haydn) in E-flat major (Hoboken I/11) by Joseph Haydn, 1760–62
- Symphony No. 11 (Michael Haydn) in B-flat major (Perger 9, Sherman 11, MH 82 and 184) by Michael Haydn, 1766
- Symphony No. 11 (Hovhaness) (Op. 186, All Men are Brothers) by Alan Hovhaness, 1960
- Symphony No. 11 (Milhaud) (Op. 384, Romantique) by Darius Milhaud, 1960
- Symphony No. 11 (Mozart) in D major (K. 84/73q) by Wolfgang Amadeus Mozart, 1770
- Symphony No. 11 (Myaskovsky) in B-flat minor (Op. 34) by Nikolai Myaskovsky, 1931–32
- Symphony No. 11 (Pettersson) by Allan Pettersson, 1971–73
- Symphony No. 11 (Rubbra) (Op. 153, à Colette) by Edmund Rubbra
- Symphony No. 11 (Shostakovich) in G minor (Op. 103, The Year 1905) by Dmitri Shostakovich, 1957
- Symphony No. 11 (Simpson) by Robert Simpson, 1990
- Symphony No. 11 (Villa-Lobos) (W527) by Heitor Villa-Lobos, 1955
