= Symphony No. 5 (Glazunov) =

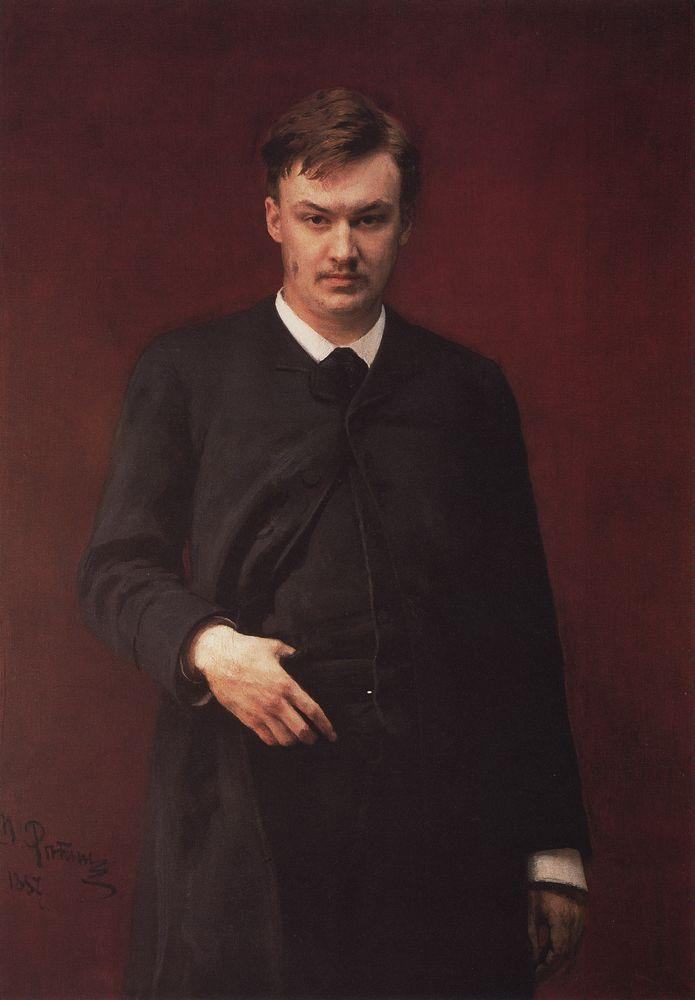
Portrait of Alexander Glazunov by Ilya Repin, 1887

The Symphony No. 5 in B♭ major, Op. 55, was written by Alexander Glazunov from April to October 1895. Although in this symphony, Glazunov returned to his conventional four-movement layout (his Fourth Symphony had only three) he frequently utilizes thematic transformation.

== Instrumentation ==
The symphony calls for a romantic orchestra of the following instruments:

3 flutes (3rd doubling piccolo), 2 oboes, 3 clarinets in B♭ (3rd doubling bass clarinet), 2 bassoons, 4 horns, 3 trumpets, 3 trombones, tuba, timpani, triangle, cymbals, bass drum, bells, harp, strings

== Structure ==
The symphony has four movements:

1. Moderato maestoso – Allegro
2. Scherzo. Moderato
3. Andante
4. Allegro maestoso – Animato

== Overview ==
Glazunov dedicated his Fifth to Sergei Taneyev, a Russian composer, pianist, and teacher, and it was first performed at the Second Russian Concert at the Hall of the Nobility in St. Petersburg on 17 November 1896; the premiere was conducted by the composer himself.
