= Symphony No. 3 (Sallinen) =

Symphony in three movements by Aulis Sallinen

- by Aulis Sallinen
- Opus: 35
- Composed: 1974–75
- Duration: Approx. 24 minutes
- Movements: 3

Premiere
- Date: 8 April 1975
- Location: Helsinki, Finland
- Conductor: Okko Kamu
- Performers: Finnish Radio Symphony Orchestra

The Symphony No. 3, Op. 35, is an orchestral composition by the Finnish composer Aulis Sallinen, who wrote the piece from 1974–75 on commission from the Finnish Broadcasting Company. The Finnish Radio Symphony Orchestra premiered the work on 8 April 1975 in Helsinki, under the direction of its principal conductor, Okko Kamu. The symphony was the first by Sallinen to depart from the single-movement structure he had utilized for his previous two essays in the form.

== Instrumentation ==
According to the publisher, Novello & Co, Symphony No. 3 is scored for the following:

- Woodwind: 4 flutes (2 doubling piccolo), 3 oboes, 4 clarinets in B♭ (1 doubling B♭ bass clarinet), 3 bassoons (1 doubling contrabassoon)
- Brass: 4 horns in F, 3 trumpets in B♭, 3 trombones, 1 tuba
- Percussion: timpani, 3 percussionists (bass drum, snare drum, small drum, tom-toms, wood blocks, tam-tam, crotales, cymbals glockenspiel, vibraphone, marimba)
- Strings: violins, violas, cellos, double basses, harp, celesta, piano

== Structure ==
The symphony is in three movements:

1. Tempo energico ed sostenuto
2. Chaconne
3. Vivace giocoso—Finale

== Recordings ==
To date, Symphony No. 3 has received two recordings, the first of which is from 1975 with Okko Kamu conducting the Finnish Radio Symphony Orchestra on the BIS label. Finnish conductor Ari Rasilainen has also recorded the symphony as part of cpo's compendium of Sallinen's orchestral works. The Third Symphony joins the Fifth (Op. 57, 1985) on the penultimate volume of the cpo series.

Conductor	Orchestra	Year	Recording venue	Duration	Label (Available on)
Okko Kamu	Finnish Radio Symphony Orchestra	1975	Kulttuuritalo (Helsinki)	23:02	BIS (41)
Ari Rasilainen	Staatsphilharmonie Rheinland-Pfalz	2004	Philharmonie (Ludwigshafen)	24:21	cpo (999970-2)

== Notes, references, and sources ==
=== Sources ===
Books

- Howell, Tim (2006). After Sibelius: Studies in Finnish Music. Routledge. ISBN 978-075-4651-77-2.
- Korhonen, Kimmo (2007). Inventing Finnish Music: Contemporary Composers from Medieval to Modern. Finnish Music Information Center (FIMIC). ISBN 978-952-5076-61-5.

CD liner notes

- Anderson, Martin (2008). Aulis Sallinen: Symphonies 3 & 5 (booklet). Ari Rasilainen & Deutsche Staatsphilharmonie Rheinland-Pfalz. Germany: CPO. p. 11–12. CPO 999970-2.
- Kamu, Okko (English translation: William Jewson) (1987). Aulis Sallinen: Sinfonia — Chorali — Sinfonia III (booklet). Okko Kamu & Finnish Radio Symphony Orchestra. Hamburg, Germany: BIS. BIS CD-41.

Journal articles

- Pike, Lionel (1997). "Reviewed Works: Symphony No. 5 ('Washington Mosaics') by Aulis Sallinen". Music & Letters. 71 (4). Oxford University Press: 625–27. (subscription required)
- Weitzman, Ronald (1997). "Sallinen's Seven Symphonies". Tempo. New Series (202). Cambridge University Press: 8–15. (subscription required)
