= Symphony No. 25 =

Symphony No. 25 may refer to:

- Symphony No. 25 (Brian), composed by Havergal Brian
- Symphony No. 25 (Haydn), composed by Joseph Haydn in 1763 or 1761
- Symphony No. 25 (Michael Haydn), composed by Michael Haydn in 1783
- Symphony No. 25 (Mozart), composed by Wolfgang Amadeus Mozart in 1773
- Symphony No. 25 (Myaskovsky), composed by Nikolai Myaskovsky
