= Symphony No. 20 =

Symphony No. 20 may refer to:

- Symphony No. 20 (Brian) in C-sharp minor by Havergal Brian, 1962
- Symphony No. 20 (Haydn) in C major (Hoboken I/20) by Joseph Haydn, c. 1761
- Symphony No. 20 (Michael Haydn) in C major (Perger 12, Sherman 20, MH 252) by Michael Haydn, 1777
- Symphony No. 20 (Hovhaness) (Op. 223, Three Journeys to a Holy Mountain) by Alan Hovhaness, 1968
- Symphony No. 20 (Ivanovs) by Jānis Ivanovs, 1981
- Symphony No. 20 (Mozart) in D major (K. 133) by Wolfgang Amadeus Mozart, 1772
- Symphony No. 20 (Myaskovsky) in E major (Op. 50) by Nikolai Myaskovsky, 1940
- Symphony No. 20 (Weinberg) by Mieczysław Weinberg, 1988
