= Symphony No. 22 =

Symphony No. 22 may refer to:

- Symphony No. 22 (Brian) (Symphonia Brevis) by Havergal Brian, 1964–65
- Symphony No. 22 (Haydn) in E-flat major (Hoboken I/22, The Philosopher) by Joseph Haydn, 1764
- Symphony No. 22 (Michael Haydn) in F major (Perger 14, Sherman 23, MH 284) by Michael Haydn, 1779
- Symphony No. 22 (Hovhaness) (Op. 236, City of Light) by Alan Hovhaness, 1970
- Symphony No. 22 (Mozart) in C major (K. 162) by Wolfgang Amadeus Mozart, 1773
- Symphony No. 22 (Myaskovsky) in B minor (Symphonic Ballad) by Nikolai Myaskovsky, 1941
