= Symphony No. 60 =

Symphony No. 60 may refer to:

- Joseph Haydn's Symphony No. 60 in C major
- Alan Hovhaness's Symphony No. 60, Op. 396, To the Appalachian Mountains
