= Symphony No. 34 =

Symphony No. 34 may refer to:

- Symphony No. 34 (Haydn)
- Symphony No. 34 (Michael Haydn)
- Symphony No. 34 (Mozart)
