= Symphony No. 31 =

Symphony No. 31 may refer to:

- Symphony No. 31 (Haydn)
- Symphony No. 31 (Michael Haydn)
- Symphony No. 31 (Mozart)
