= Symphony No. 48 =

Symphony No. 48 may refer to:

- Symphony No. 48 (Haydn)
- Symphony, K. 111+120 (Mozart)
- Symphony, K. 98 (Mozart)
