= Symphony No. 6 in B minor =

Symphony No. 6 in B Minor may refer to:

- Symphony No. 6 (Tchaikovsky) Pathetique
- Felix Weingartner's Symphony No. 6, op. 74 "in Gedenken des 19. November 1828"
- Symphony No. 6 (Shostakovich)

== See also ==
- List of symphonies in B minor
