= Symphony No. 17 =

Symphony No. 17 can refer to:

- Symphony No. 17 (Brian) by Havergal Brian
- Symphony No. 17 (Haydn)
- Symphony No. 17 (Michael Haydn)
- Symphony No. 17 (Mozart)
- Symphony No. 17 (Myaskovsky) by Nikolai Myaskovsky
