= Symphony No. 29 =

Symphony No. 29 may refer to:

- Symphony No. 29 (Haydn)
- Symphony No. 29 (Michael Haydn)
- Symphony No. 29 (Mozart)
