= Symphony No. 5 in D major =

Symphony No. 5 in D Major may refer to:

- Symphony No. 5 (Mendelssohn)
- Symphony No. 5 (Vaughan Williams)
