= Symphony No. 38 =

Symphony No. 38 may refer to:

- Symphony No. 38 (Haydn), composed by Joseph Haydn at some time between 1765 and 1769
- Symphony No. 38 (Michael Haydn), composed by Michael Haydn in 1788
- Symphony No. 38 (Mozart), composed by Wolfgang Amadeus Mozart in late 1786
