= Symphony No. 0 =

Symphony No. 0 may refer to:

- Anton Bruckner's Symphony No. 0 (Nullte)
- Anton Bruckner's Symphony in F minor, sometimes called No. 00 (Study Symphony)
- Alfred Schnittke's Symphony No. 0
- Kaikhosru Shapurji Sorabji's Piano Symphony No. 0

== See also ==
- Piano Concerto No. 0 (Beethoven)
