= Symphony No. 26 =

Symphony No. 26 may refer to:

- Symphony No. 26 (Haydn)
- Symphony No. 26 (Michael Haydn)
- Symphony No. 26 (Mozart)
- Symphony No. 26 (Myaskovsky) by Nikolai Myaskovsky
