= Symphony No. 33 =

Symphony No. 33 may refer to:

- Symphony No. 33 (Haydn)
- Symphony No. 33 (Michael Haydn)
- Symphony No. 33 (Mozart)
