= Symphony No. 50 =

Symphony No. 50 may refer to:

- Symphony No. 50 (Haydn) in C major (Hoboken I/50) by Joseph Haydn, 1773–74
- Symphony No. 50 (Hovhaness) (Op. 360, Mount St. Helens) by Alan Hovhaness, 1982
- Symphony No. 50 (Mozart) in D major (K. 161/141a) by Wolfgang Amadeus Mozart, 1772
