= Symphony No. 18 =

Symphony No. 18 can refer to:

- Symphony No. 18 (Mozart)
- Symphony No. 18 (Haydn)
- Symphony No. 18 (Michael Haydn)
