= Symphony No. 15 =

Symphony No. 15 may refer to:

- Symphony No. 15 (Brian) in A major by Havergal Brian, 1960
- Symphony No. 15 (Haydn) in D major (Hoboken I/15) by Joseph Haydn, 1760–63
- Symphony No. 15 (Michael Haydn) in D major (Perger 41, Sherman 15, MH 150) by Michael Haydn, c. 1771
- Symphony No. 15 (Hovhaness) (Op. 199, Silver Pilgrimage), by Alan Hovhaness, 1962
- Symphony No. 15 (Mozart) in G major (K. 124) by Wolfgang Amadeus Mozart, 1772
- Symphony No. 15 (Myaskovsky) in D minor (Op. 38) by Nikolai Myaskovsky, 1934
- Symphony No. 15 (Shostakovich) in A major (Op. 141) by Dmitri Shostakovich, 1971
