= Symphony No. 9 in E minor =

Symphony No. 9 in E minor may refer to:

- Antonín Dvořák's Symphony No. 9, Op. 95, B. 178 (1893)
- Nikolai Myaskovsky's Symphony No. 9, Op. 28 (1926–7)
- Joachim Raff's Symphony No. 9, Op. 208 "Im Sommer" (1878)

== See also ==
- List of symphonies in E minor
- List of symphonies in E-flat minor
