= Symphony No. 63 =

Symphony No. 63 may refer to:

- Joseph Haydn's Symphony No. 63 in C major
- Alan Hovhaness's Symphony No. 63, Op. 411, Loon Lake
