= Symphony No. 16 =

Symphony No. 16 can refer to:

- Symphony No. 16 (Brian) in C-sharp minor by Havergal Brian, 1960
- Symphony No. 16 (Haydn) in B-flat major (Hoboken I/16) by Joseph Haydn, c. 1757–61
- Symphony No. 16 (Michael Haydn) in A major (Perger 6, Sherman 16, MH 152), by Michael Haydn, 1771
- Symphony No. 16 (Mozart) in C major (K. 128) by Wolfgang Amadeus Mozart, 1772
- Symphony No. 16 (Myaskovsky) in F major (Op. 39, Aviation) by Nikolai Myaskovsky, 1935–36
