= Symphony No. 37 =

Symphony No. 37 may refer to:

- Symphony No. 37 (Haydn), composed by Joseph Haydn
- Symphony No. 37 (Michael Haydn), composed by Michael Haydn in 1788
- Symphony No. 37 (Mozart), composed by Wolfgang Amadeus Mozart in late 1783
