= Symphony No. 9 =

Symphony No. 9 most commonly refers to:

- Symphony No. 9 (Beethoven) in D minor (Op. 125, Choral) by Ludwig van Beethoven, 1822–24
- Symphony No. 9 (Dvořák) in E minor (Op. 95, B. 178, From the New World) by Antonín Dvořák, 1893

== Symphonies ==
- Symphony No. 9 (Arnold) (Op. 128) by Malcolm Arnold, 1986
- Symphony No. 9 (Brian) in A minor by Havergal Brian, 1951
- Symphony No. 9 (Bruckner) in D minor (WAB 109, dem lieben Gott) by Anton Bruckner, 1887–96 (unfinished)
- Symphony No. 9 (Davies) (Op. 315) by Peter Maxwell Davies, 2011–12
- Symphony No. 9 (Diamond) by David Diamond, 1985
- Symphony No. 9 (Ficher) (Op. 123) by Jacobo Ficher, 1973
- Symphony No. 9 (Glass) by Philip Glass, 2010–11
- Symphony No. 9 (Glazunov) in D minor, 1910–36 (unfinished)
- Symphony No. 9 (Haydn) in C major (Hoboken I/9) by Joseph Haydn, 1762
- Symphony No. 9 (Michael Haydn) in D major (Perger 36, Sherman 9, MH 50) by Michael Haydn, 1766
- Symphony No. 9 (Henze) by Hans Werner Henze, 1997
- Symphony No. 9 (Hovhaness) (Op. 180, St. Vartan) by Alan Hovhaness, 1949–50
- Symphony No. 9 (Mahler) by Gustav Mahler, 1908–09
- Symphony No. 9 (Milhaud) (Op. 380) by Darius Milhaud, 1959
- Symphony No. 9 (Mozart) in C major (K. 73/75a) by Wolfgang Amadeus Mozart, 1772
- Symphony No. 9 (Myaskovsky) in E minor (Op. 28) by Nikolai Myaskovsky, 1926–27
- Symphony No. 9 (Pettersson) by Allan Pettersson, 1970
- Symphony No. 9 (Rubbra) (Op. 140, Resurrection) by Edmund Rubbra
- Symphony No. 9 (Schnittke) by Alfred Schnittke
- Symphony No. 9 (Schubert) in C major (D. 944, Great) by Franz Schubert, c. 1825
- Symphony No. 9 (Schuman) (Le fosse Ardeatine) by William Schuman, 1968
- Symphony No. 9 (Sessions) by Roger Sessions, 1978
- Symphony No. 9 (Shostakovich) in E-flat major (Op. 70) by Dmitri Shostakovich, 1945
- Symphony No. 9 (Simpson) by Robert Simpson, 1985–87
- Symphony No. 9 (Vaughan Williams) in E minor by Ralph Vaughan Williams, 1956–57
- Symphony No. 9 (Villa-Lobos) (W510) by Heitor Villa-Lobos, 1952

== Film ==
- Symphony No. 9 (film), a 2019 Iranian film written and directed by Mohammad-Reza Honarmand

== Other uses ==
- Symphony No. 9 (mixtape), a 2012 mixtape by Brianna Perry

== See also ==
- Curse of the ninth, a superstition that writing a 9th symphony can be fatal for its composer
