= Symphony No. 30 =

Symphony No. 30 may refer to:

- Symphony No. 30 (Haydn), also known as the Alleluia Symphony, composed by Joseph Haydn in 1765
- Symphony No. 30 (Michael Haydn), composed by Michael Haydn in 1785
- Symphony No. 30 (Mozart), composed by Wolfgang Amadeus Mozart in 1774
