= Symphony No. 24 =

Symphony No. 24 may refer to:

- Symphony No. 24 (Brian) in D major by Havergal Brian, 1965
- Symphony No. 24 (Haydn) in D major (Hoboken I/24) by Joseph Haydn, 1764
- Symphony No. 24 (Michael Haydn) in A major (Perger 15, Sherman 24, MH 302 by Michael Haydn, 1781
- Symphony No. 24 (Mozart) in B-flat major (K. 182/173dA) by Wolfgang Amadeus Mozart, 1773
- Symphony No. 24 (Myaskovsky) in F minor (Op. 63) by Nikolai Myaskovsky, 1943
