= Symphony No. 27 =

Symphony No. 27 may refer to:

- Symphony No. 27 (Brian) by Havergal Brian
- Symphony No. 27 (Haydn)
- Symphony No. 27 (Michael Haydn)
- Symphony No. 27 (Mozart)
- Symphony No. 27 (Myaskovsky) by Nikolai Myaskovsky
