= Symphony No. 1 in D minor =

Symphony No. 1 in D minor may refer to

- Symphony No. 1 The Gothic by Havergal Brian
- Symphony No. 1 by Charles Ives
- Symphony No. 1 by Giuseppe Martucci
- Symphony No. 1 by Sergei Rachmaninoff
- Symphony No. 1 for organ by Louis Vierne
- Symphony No. 1 by Alexander von Zemlinsky

== See also ==
- Symphony No. 1 (disambiguation)
