= Symphony No. 28 =

Symphony No. 28 may refer to:

- Symphony No. 28 (Haydn)
- Symphony No. 28 (Michael Haydn)
- Symphony No. 28 (Mozart)
