= Symphony No. 14 =

Symphony No. 14 may refer to:

- Symphony No. 14 (Brian) in F minor by Havergal Brian, 1959–60
- Symphony No. 14 (Haydn) in A major (Hoboken I/14) by Joseph Haydn, c. 1761–63
- Symphony No. 14 (Michael Haydn) in B-flat major (Perger 52, Sherman 14, MH 133) by Michael Haydn, 1768–70
- Symphony No. 14 (Mozart) in A major (K. 114) by Wolfgang Amadeus Mozart, 1771
- Symphony No. 14 (Myaskovsky) in C major (Op. 37) by Nikolai Myaskovsky, 1933
- Symphony No. 14 (Shostakovich) (Op. 135) by Dmitri Shostakovich, 1969
