= Symphony No. 32 =

Symphony No. 32 may refer to:

- Symphony No. 32 (Haydn)
- Symphony No. 32 (Michael Haydn)
- Symphony No. 32 (Mozart)
