= Symphony No. 5 in B-flat =

Symphony No. 5 in B Flat can refer to:

- Symphony No. 5 (Schubert)
- Symphony No. 5 (Bruckner)
- Symphony No. 5 (Prokofiev)
