= Symphony No. 13 =

Symphony No. 13 may refer to:

- Symphony No. 13 (Brian) in C major by Havergal Brian, 1959
- Symphony No. 13 (Glass) (Truth in our Time) by Philip Glass, 2022
- Symphony No. 13 (Haydn) in D major by Joseph Haydn, 1763
- Symphony No. 13 (Michael Haydn) in D major (Perger 37, Sherman 13, MH 132) by Michael Haydn, 1768
- Symphony No. 13 (Milhaud) (Op. 404, Pacem in terris) by Darius Milhaud, 1963
- Symphony No. 13 (Mozart) in F major (K. 112) by Wolfgang Amadeus Mozart, 1771
- Symphony No. 13 (Myaskovsky) in B-flat minor (Op. 36) by Nikolai Myaskovsky, 1933
- Symphony No. 13 (Shostakovich) in B-flat minor (Op. 113, Babi Yar) by Dmitri Shostakovich, 1962
