= Symphony No. 12 =

Symphony No. 12 may refer to:

- Symphony No. 12 (Brian) by Havergal Brian, 1957
- Symphony No. 12 (Glass) (Lodger) by Philip Glass, 2018
- Symphony No. 12 (Haydn) in E major (Hoboken I/12) by Joseph Haydn, 1763
- Symphony No. 12 (Michael Haydn) in G major (Perger 7, Sherman 12, MH 108) by Michael Haydn, 1768
- Symphony No. 12 (Milhaud) (Op. 390) La Rurale by Darius Milhaud, 1961
- Symphony No. 12 (Mozart) in G major (K. 110/75b) by Wolfgang Amadeus Mozart, 1771
- Symphony No. 12 (Myaskovsky) in G minor (Op. 35, Kolkhoznaya) by Nikolai Myaskovsky, 1932
- Symphony No. 12 (Shostakovich) in D minor (Op. 112, The Year of 1917) by Dmitri Shostakovich, 1961
- Symphony No. 12 (Villa-Lobos) (W539) by Heitor Villa-Lobos, 1957
