= Symphony No. 40 =

Symphony No. 40 may refer to:

- Symphony No. 40 (Haydn), F major symphony by Joseph Haydn, composed in 1763
- Symphony No. 40 (Michael Haydn), F major symphony, MH 507, Perger 32, by Michael Haydn, composed in 1789
- Symphony No. 40 (Mozart), G minor symphony by Wolfgang Amadeus Mozart, composed in 1788
