= Symphony No. 66 =

Symphony No. 66 may refer to:

- Joseph Haydn's Symphony No. 66 in B flat major
- Alan Hovhaness's Symphony No. 66, Op. 428, Hymn to Glacier Peak
