= Symphony No. 35 =

Symphony No. 35 may refer to:

- Symphony No. 35 (Haydn)
- Symphony No. 35 (Michael Haydn)
- Symphony No. 35 (Mozart)
