= Symphony No. 2 in D major =

Symphony No. 2 in D Major may refer to:

- Ludwig van Beethoven's Symphony No. 2 opus 36 (1802)
- Franz Berwald's Symphony No. 2, Capricieuse (1842)
- Johannes Brahms' Symphony No. 2, opus 73 (1877)
- Norbert Burgmüller's Symphony No. 2, opus 11 (1834–6)
- Muzio Clementi's Symphony "No. 2" WoO 33 (incomplete) (begun 1819)
- Louise Farrenc's Symphony No. 2, opus 35
- Frederic Ernest Fesca's Symphony No. 2, opus 10
- William W. Gilchrist's Symphony No. 2
- Leopold Hofmann's Symphony Kimball D2
- Franz Krommer's Symphony No. 2, opus 40 (published 1803)
- Adolf Fredrik Lindblad's Symphony No. 2 (by 1855)
- Étienne Méhul's Symphony No. 2 (1808–9)
- Otto Nicolai's Symphony No. 2 (1845)
- Jean Sibelius' Symphony No. 2, opus 43 (1902)
- Christian Sinding's Symphony No. 2, opus 83 (1904)

== See also ==
- List of symphonies in D major
