= Symphony No. 21 =

Symphony No. 21 may refer to:

- Symphony No. 21 (Brian) in E-flat by Havergal Brian, 1963
- Symphony No. 21 (Haydn) in A major (Hoboken I/21) by Joseph Haydn, c. 1764
- Symphony No. 21 (Michael Haydn) in D major (Perger 42, Sherman 21, MH 272) by Michael Haydn, 1778
- Symphony No. 21 (Mozart) in A major (K. 134) by Wolfgang Amadeus Mozart, 1772
- Symphony No. 21 (Ovsianiko-Kulikovsky) in G minor, a hoax by Mikhail Goldstein, c. 1949
- Symphony No. 21 (Weinberg) (Op. 152, Kaddish) by Mieczysław Weinberg, 1991
