= Symphony No. 39 =

Symphony No. 39 may refer to:

- Symphony No. 39 (Haydn)
- Symphony No. 39 (Michael Haydn)
- Symphony No. 39 (Mozart)
