= Symphony No. 23 =

Symphony No. 23 may refer to:

- Symphony No. 23 (Brian) by Havergal Brian, 1965
- Symphony No. 23 (Haydn) in G major (Hoboken I/23) by Joseph Haydn, 1764
- Symphony No. 23 (Michael Haydn) in D major (Perger 43, Sherman 22, MH 287) by Michael Haydn, c. 1779
- Symphony No. 23 (Mozart) in D major (K. 181/162b) by Wolfgang Amadeus Mozart, 1773
- Symphony No. 23 (Myaskovsky) in A minor (Op. 56, Symphony-Suite on Kabardanian Themes) by Nikolai Myaskovsky, 1941
