= Symphony No. 41 =

Symphony No. 41 may refer to:

- Symphony No. 41 (Haydn) in C major (Hoboken I/41) by Joseph Haydn, 1769
- Symphony No. 41 (Michael Haydn) in A major (Perger 33, Sherman 41, MH 508) by Michael Haydn, 1789
- Symphony No. 41 (Mozart) in C major (K. 551, Jupiter) by Wolfgang Amadeus Mozart, 1788
