= Symphony No. 1 (Spohr) =

Symphony by Louis Spohr

- by Louis Spohr
- Key: E flat major
- Opus: 20
- Movements: four
- Scoring: Orchestra

The Symphony No. 1 in E♭ major, Op. 20 by Louis Spohr was written and published in 1811 and first performed in April of that year.

== Movements ==
The symphony is divided into four movements with the following tempo markings:

1. Adagio – Allegro (E♭ major)
2. Larghetto con moto (A♭ major)
3. Scherzo. Allegro (E♭ major)
4. Finale. Allegretto (E♭ major)

== Recordings ==
The symphony has been recorded by Howard Griffiths and the NDR Radiophilharmonie, as well as Howard Shelley with the Orchestra della Svizzera Italiana. A recording by Alfred Walter and the Budapest Symphony Orchestra on the Naxos label is also available.
