= Symphony No. 1 in D major =

Symphony No. 1 in D major may refer to:

- Symphony No. 1 (Haydn)
- Symphony No. 1 (Mahler)
- Symphony No. 1 (Prokofiev)
- Symphony No. 1 (Schubert)
