= Symphony No. 19 (Mozart) =

1772 composition by W. A. Mozart

- by W. A. Mozart
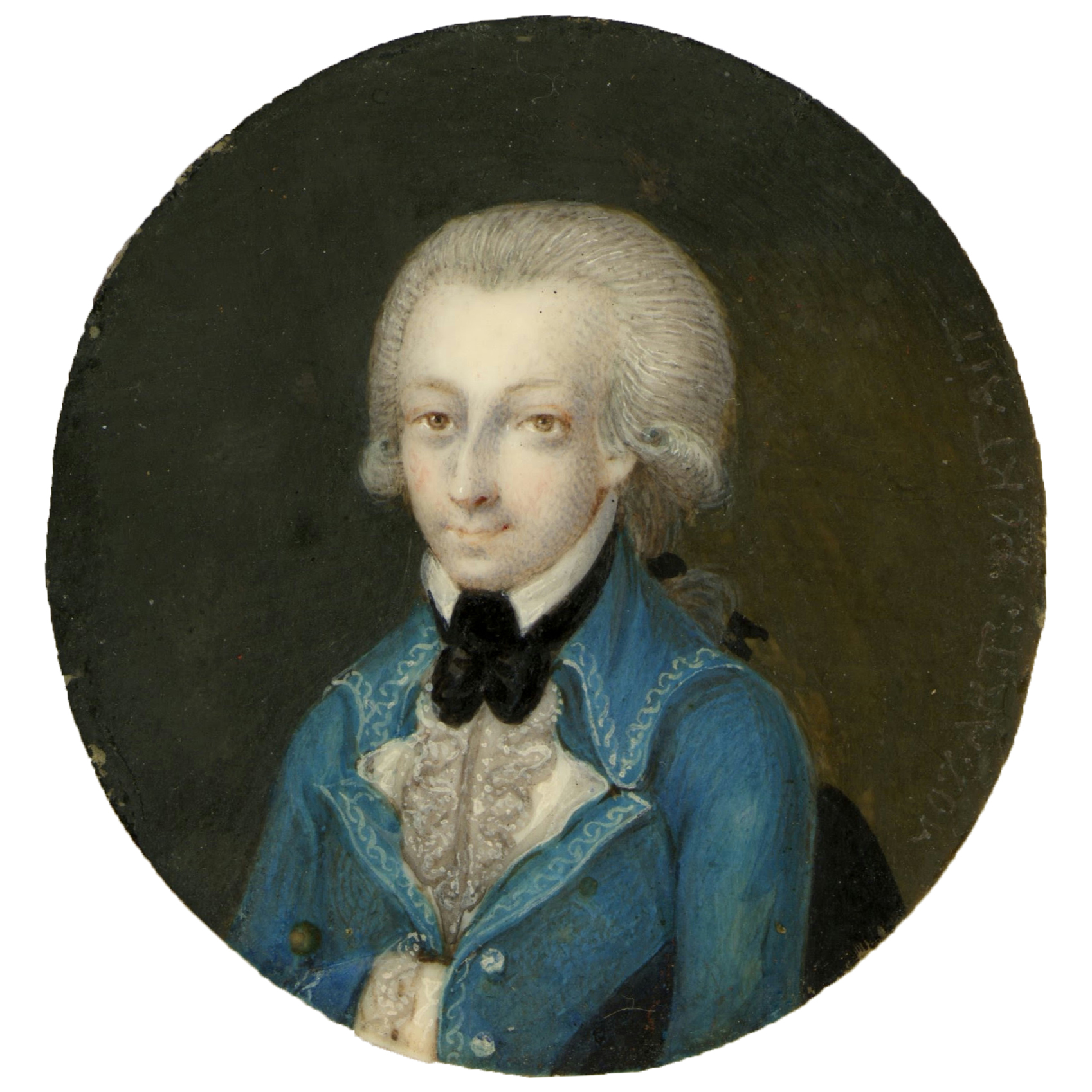
- Mozart in 1773, portrait by Martin Knoller
- Key: E♭ major
- Catalogue: K. 132
- Commissioned by: Hieronymus von Colloredo
- Composed: Salzburg, July 1772
- Duration: c. 19 minutes
- Movements: 4
- Scoring: Orchestra

Symphony No. 19 in E♭ major, K. 132, is a symphony composed by Wolfgang Amadeus Mozart in July 1772. It was one of a group of 17 symphonies composed in Salzburg for the court orchestra of Archbishop Hieronymus, Count Colloredo, Mozart's employer.

== Structure ==
Like the other symphonies that Mozart composed between December 1771 to August 1772, the symphony features relatively large wind section. It is scored for two oboes, four horns (two in E♭ high, two in E♭ low), and strings. These forces are surprising because the official list of instrumentalists in the court orchestra included only two/three horns and no flutes. This meant that Mozart would have had to rely on the relatively common practice of certain instrumentalists switching to a secondary instrument (oboists playing the flute, for example).

I. Allegro

II. Andante

III. Menuetto – Trio

IV. Allegro

There are four movements:

1. Allegro, 4/4
2. Andante, 3/8
3. Menuetto – Trio, 3/4
4. Allegro, 2/2

The first movement opens with a motif that Mozart would later use at the beginning of his twenty-second piano concerto in the same key. The exposition is brief and there is no repeat. The development focuses on new material.

There is also an alternative slow movement, marked Andantino grazioso. The tempo marks in the first, second and fourth movements were written in the hand of Leopold Mozart.

The finale is a French rondo in seven-part form (ABACADA). Each part of the rondo is repeated except for the final A.
