= Symphony No. 1 in C minor =

Symphony No. 1 in C minor may refer to:

- Boris Alexandrovich Arapov Symphony No. 1 (1947)
- Johannes Brahms Symphony No. 1, op. 68 (1876)
- Anton Bruckner Symphony No. 1 (1868)
- Norbert Burgmüller Symphony No. 1, op. 2 (1831-3)
- Frederic Cliffe Symphony No. 1 (1889)
- Carl Czerny Symphony No. 1, Op. 781 (his first numbered symphony, an unnumbered D major having been performed in 1814)
- Antonín Dvořák Symphony No. 1, B. 9 "The Bells of Zlonice" (1865)
- Louise Farrenc Symphony No. 1, op. 32 (1841)
- Niels Gade Symphony No. 1, op. 5 (1842)
- Johan Halvorsen Symphony No. 1 (1923)
- Heinrich von Herzogenberg Symphony No. 1, op. 50
- Richard Hol Symphony No. 1 (1863)
- Albéric Magnard Symphony No. 1, op. 4 (1890)[12]
- Daniel Gregory Mason Symphony No. 1, op. 11 (1913-4)
- Felix Mendelssohn Symphony No. 1, op. 11 (1824)
- Nikolai Myaskovsky Symphony No. 1, op. 3 (1908, rev. 1921)
- John Knowles Paine Symphony No. 1, op. 23 (1875)
- Boris Parsadanian Symphony No. 1 op. 5 (1958)
- Alice Mary Smith Symphony No. 1 (1863)
- Eduard Tubin Symphony No. 1 ETW 1 (1931-4)
- Richard Wetz Symphony No. 1 (1916)
- Felix Woyrsch Symphony No. 1 (1908)

== See also ==
- List of symphonies in C minor
- Edvard Grieg Symphony in C minor, EG 119
- Xaver Scharwenka Symphony, op. 60 (1885)
- Ernest Schelling Symphony in C minor
