= Symphony No. 36 (Haydn) =

Symphony in four movements by Joseph Haydn

Joseph Haydn

Joseph Haydn wrote his Symphony No. 36 in E♭ major, Hoboken 1/36, some time in the first half of the 1760s, around the same time as his Symphony No. 33, for Prince Nikolaus Esterházy. Scored for two oboes, bassoon, two horns, strings, and continuo, the slow movement features solos for violin and cello.

The symphony is in four movements:

1. Vivace, 3/4
2. Adagio in B♭ major, 2/2
3. Menuet – Trio (Trio in B♭ major), 3/4
4. Allegro, 2/4
