= Symphony in E-flat major, Op. 11, No. 3 (Stamitz) =

The Symphony in E♭ major, Op. 11, No. 3 is a late symphony by Johann Stamitz, likely written in Paris in 1754 or 1755. It was published as No. 6 in a 1769 publication of six symphonies by Stamitz. This is one of his last symphonies and follows the standard four-movement symphonic scheme of the time:

1. Allegro assai
2. Andantino
3. Menuetto – Trio
4. Prestissimo

The symphony is approximately fifteen minutes in length and demonstrates Stamitz's late symphonic style. It represents the culmination of the Mannheim school of orchestral playing, which emphasized extended techniques for the instruments and attention to the details of dynamics. The concept of Sturm und Drang can be heard in this work with its sudden dynamic changes and a sharp texture change, presented when the oboes enter with the "B" theme.
