= Symphony No. 1 in C major =

Symphony No. 1 in C major may refer to:

- Symphony No. 1 (Balakirev)
- Symphony No. 1 (Beethoven)
- Symphony No. 1 (Michael Haydn)

== See also ==
- Symphony in C (Bizet)
- Symphony in C (Dukas)
- Symphony in C major (Wagner)
