= Symphony No. 4 (Glazunov) =

Symphony by Alexander Glazunov

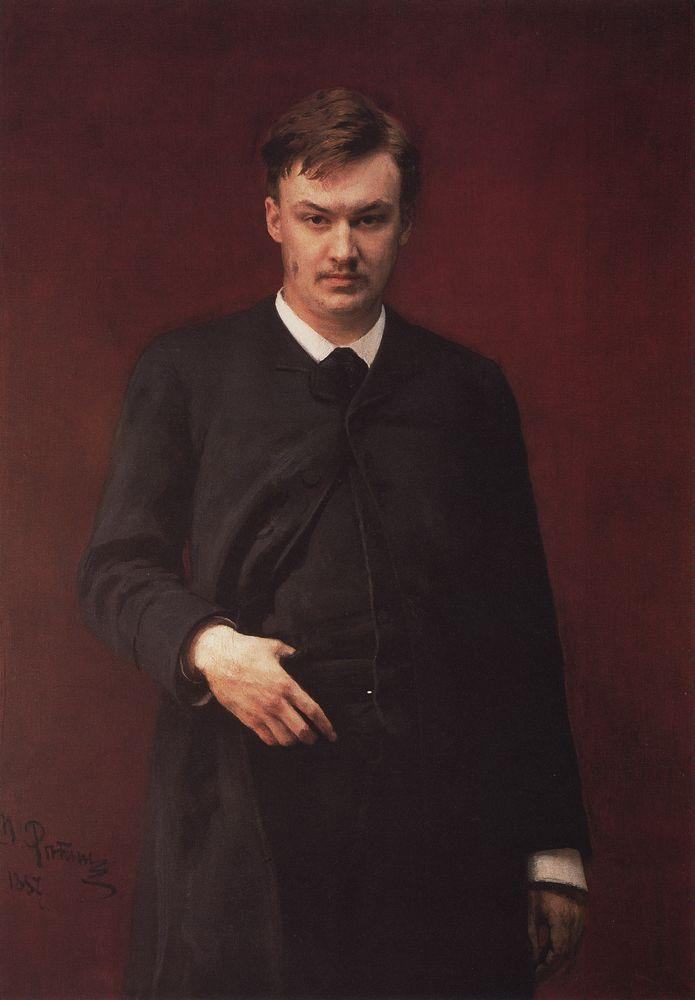
Portrait of Alexander Glazunov by Ilya Repin, 1887

The Symphony No. 4 in E♭ major, Op. 48, was written by Alexander Glazunov in 1893. The symphony was a departure from Glazunov's three earlier symphonies, which were based on nationalistic Russian tunes and, according to the composer, allowed him to give "personal, free, and subjective impressions of myself."

== History ==
The symphony is dedicated to Anton Rubinstein, a fellow composer and pianist, and has three movements compared to Glazunov's regular four. Glazunov finished the symphony on 4 December 1893, and it was premiered at the Third Russian Concert at the Hall of Nobility on 22 January 1894. The premiere was conducted by Nikolai Rimsky-Korsakov, another eminent Russian composer, who declared the work "marvellous, noble, expressive". Later, Glazunov's daughter, Elena Glazunova-Gunther, would tell her biographer that the Fourth Symphony was the favorite Glazunov symphony in Europe, while the Fifth was favored in America.

== Structure ==
Three movements make up the work:

1. Andante – Allegro moderato
2. Scherzo
3. Andante – Allegro
