= Antonio Casimir Cartellieri =

Polish-Austrian composer

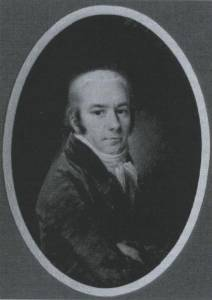
- Born: September 27, 1772; Gdańsk, Kingdom of Poland
- Died: September 2, 1807 (aged 34); Libčeves, Kingdom of Bohemia, Austrian Empire
- Occupations: composer, violinist, conductor, voice teacher

Antonio Casimir Cartellieri (27 September 1772 – 2 September 1807) was a Polish-Austrian composer, violinist, conductor, and voice teacher. His reputation dissipated after his death, not to be resurrected until the late 20th century. One son was the spa physician Paul Cartellieri. Another, Josef Cartellieri, compiled some largely second-hand biographical notes about the father he scarcely knew.

== Life and career ==
Cartellieri was born in Gdańsk, Poland. His father, Antonio Maria Gaetano Cartellieri, was Italian, and his mother, Elisabeth Böhm, was Latvian of Baltic German origin. Both of his parents were opera singers and he received his earliest musical education from them. When he was 13, his parents divorced, at which time Cartellieri moved with his mother to Berlin. In that city he began studying music composition.

In 1791, at the age of 18, Cartellieri became court composer and music director for Michał Kazimierz Ogiński in Poland. In 1793, he returned to Berlin with his employer where his first opera premiered successfully. He then went with the Count to Vienna, where he continued with further musical studies in music theory and composition under Johann Georg Albrechtsberger and possibly Antonio Salieri.

On 29–30 March 1795, the première of his oratorio Gioas re di Giuda took place in Wiener Burgtheater. (In the interval, Beethoven played his piano concerto which became Beethoven's debut as a composer.) In 1796, Cartellieri was engaged by Prince Joseph Franz Maximilian Lobkowicz (1772–1817) as the Kapellmeister, singing teacher, and violinist, roles he held until his death 11 years later. His other duties at court included directing operas and playing the violin in both concerts of chamber music and symphonic music. He notably performed in the world premières of several works by his friend Beethoven under the composer's baton, including the Eroica Symphony and the Triple Concerto on 23 January 1805. He died in Liebhausen (Libčeves), Bohemia at the age of 34.

== Selected works ==
Symphonies

- Symphony No. 1 in C minor (Vienna, 1795)
- Symphony No. 2 in E♭ major (Vienna, 1795)
- Symphony No. 3 in C major
- Symphony No. 4 in E♭ major
- Three Overtures for grand orchestra

Concertos

- Flute Concerto in G major (c. 1792)
- Concerto for 2 clarinets & orchestra in B♭ major (Vienna, 1797)
- Clarinet Concerto No. 1 in B♭ major
- Clarinet Concerto No. 2 in B♭ major
- Clarinet Concerto No. 3 in E♭ major
- Bassoon Concerto (Vienna, 1795)
- Horn Concerto
- Concerto for 2 Flutes
- Concerto for Oboe & Bassoon No. 1
- Concerto for Oboe & Bassoon No. 2
- Concerto for Oboe, Horn & Bassoon

Chamber works

- Divertimento for winds & strings in E♭ major
- Divertimento for winds No 1 in F major (1792) (Octet for Oboes, Clarinets, Horns, Bassoons)
- Divertimento for winds No 2 in F major (1792) (Octet for Oboes, Clarinets, Horns, Bassoons)
- Divertimento for winds No 3 in F major (1792) (Octet for Oboes, Clarinets, Horns, Bassoons)
- Partita No. 1 in E♭ major, sextet for winds (Clarinets, Horns, Bassoons)
- Partita No. 2 in E♭ major, sextet for winds (Clarinets, Horns, Bassoons)
- Partita No. 3 in E♭ major, sextet for winds (Clarinets, Horns, Bassoons)
- Quartet for clarinet & string trio in D major
- Quartet for clarinet & string trio No. 1 in D major
- Quartet for clarinet & string trio No. 2 in E♭ major
- Quartet for clarinet & string trio No. 3 in B♭ major
- Quartet for clarinet & string trio No. 4 in E♭ major
- Three String Quartets

Choral works

- Kontimar und Zora, Cantata (Berlin, 1792)
- Gioas re di Giuda (Joas, king of Judah), Oratorio (Vienna, 1795)
- Siegesfeier (Vienna, 1797)
- La celebre Nativita del Redentore, Oratorio (Vienna, 1806)
- La purificatione di Maria Virgine, Oratorio (Prague, 1807)

Operas

- Die Geisterbeschwörung (Singspiel, Berlin, 1793)
- Anton (Singspiel, Berlin, 1796)
- Angarda Regina di Boemia (Opera eroi-comica, Vienna, 1799)
- Der Rübezahl, Beherrscher der Geister (1801)
- Il Secreto (L. Prividali, Vienna, 1804)
- Attalinda
- Il duello fortunato
- Il giudice nella propria causa

Liturgical works

- Seven Masses
- Two Motets

== Sources ==
- Antonio Casimir Cartellieri at last.fm
