= Symphony No. 3 (Shostakovich) =

1929 choral symphony by Dmitri Shostakovich

- The First of May
- by Dmitri Shostakovich
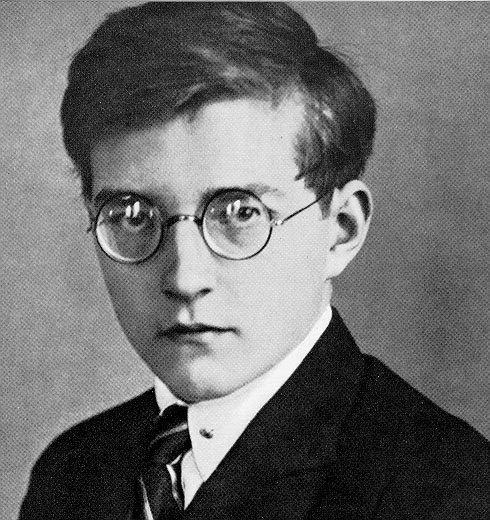
- Shostakovich in 1925
- Key: E♭ major
- Opus: 20
- Text: The First of May by Semyon Kirsanov
- Language: Russian
- Composed: c. 1930
- Duration: c. 30 minutes
- Movements: 4
- Scoring: Orchestra and mixed chorus

Premiere
- Date: 21 January 1930
- Conductor: Aleksandr Gauk
- Performers: Leningrad Philharmonic Orchestra, Academy Capella Choir

The Symphony No. 3 in E♭ major (subtitled The First of May), Op. 20 by Dmitri Shostakovich was first performed by the Leningrad Philharmonic Orchestra and Academy Capella Choir under Aleksandr Gauk on 21 January 1930 (the anniversary of Lenin's death).

== Background ==
Like the Second Symphony, the Third was written at a time when the freedom and modernism of the New Economic Policy (NEP) was giving way to the dominance of the Russian Association of Proletarian Musicians. The Third more obviously reflects the latter's demands for clear, simple expression of musical and political ideas, in its largely diatonic writing, its insistent rhythms, its remaining largely fixed in the 'home' key of E♭, its episodic nature, and in the use of a revolutionary text as a finale to deliver a clear, politically attuned message.

Unlike the Second, which was commissioned by the State Publishing House to honour the tenth anniversary of the October Revolution, the Third was composed without a commission, with a text chosen by Shostakovich. In his report to the Leningrad Conservatory (1929), Shostakovich wrote “While in the [Second Symphony] the main content is struggle, the “May First” expresses the festive spirit of peaceful construction, if I may put it that way. To make the main idea clearer for the listeners, I introduced a chorus to words by the poet Kirsanov at the end."

== Reception ==
Although, later in life, Shostakovich himself was unhappy with the Third, at the time of its premiere it was positively received. Boris Asafyev called it "the birth of the symphony out of the dynamism of revolutionary oratory", and it was quickly performed in America by Leopold Stokowski, in Philadelphia in 1932 and at Carnegie Hall in early 1933. American critics were divided, with Lawrence Gilman calling it "brainless and trivial music". As Soviet musical ideas changed and central control developed with the concept of Socialist Realism in the 1930s the Third was branded a symbol of "formalism" and dropped from the repertoire. It was not performed again until the 1960s.

== Instrumentation ==
The symphony is scored for mixed chorus and an orchestra of 3 flutes (3rd doubling piccolo), 2 oboes, 2 clarinets, 2 bassoons, 4 horns, 2 trumpets, 3 trombones, tuba, percussion (timpani, triangle, snare drum, cymbals, bass drum, tam-tam, glockenspiel, and xylophone), and strings.

== Structure ==
The symphony was written during the summer of 1929, much of it while on a six-week cruise along the Black Sea coast. Like the Second Symphony, it is a single-movement choral symphony which lasts around 25 to 30 minutes. Although the music is continuous, however, it falls into four unequal sections, the first two substantial and the last two, including the choral finale, much shorter:

1. Allegretto – Allegro
2. Andante
3. Largo
4. Moderato

The finale sets a text by Semyon Isaakovich Kirsanov praising May Day and the October Revolution. It is possible that, with its introductory recitative and brisk ending, Shostakovich was referencing the finale of Beethoven's Ninth, just as the Symphony's consistent tonality of E♭ may recall Beethoven's Eroica.

Around the time he was working on the symphony, Shostakovich said to a friend that “it would be interesting to write a symphony in which not one theme is repeated.” And in the Third he experimented with this idea. Like a May Day parade, sections pass by and do not return, and none of the themes is exactly repeated.

== Text ==
On the very first May Day ("the first first of May", in Russian)
a torch was thrown into the past,
a spark, growing into a fire,
and a flame enveloped the forest.

With the drooping fir trees' ears
the forest listened
to the voices and noises
of the new May Day parade.

Our May Day.
In the whistling of grief's bullets
grasping bayonet and gun,
the tsar's palace was taken.

The fallen tsar's palace:
this was the dawn of May,
marching ahead,
in the light of grief's banners.

Our May Day:
in the future there will be sails,
unfurled over the sea of corn,
and the resounding steps of the corps.

New corps, the new ranks of May
their eyes like fires looking to the future.
factories and workers
march in the May Day parade.

We will reap the land,
our time has come.
Listen, workers, to the voice of our factories:
in burning down the old, you must kindle a new reality.

Banners rising like the sun,
march, let your steps resound.
Every May Day
is a step towards Socialism.

May Day is the march
of armed miners.
Into the squares, revolution,
march with a million feet!
