= Sergiu Natra =

Israeli composer (1924–2021)

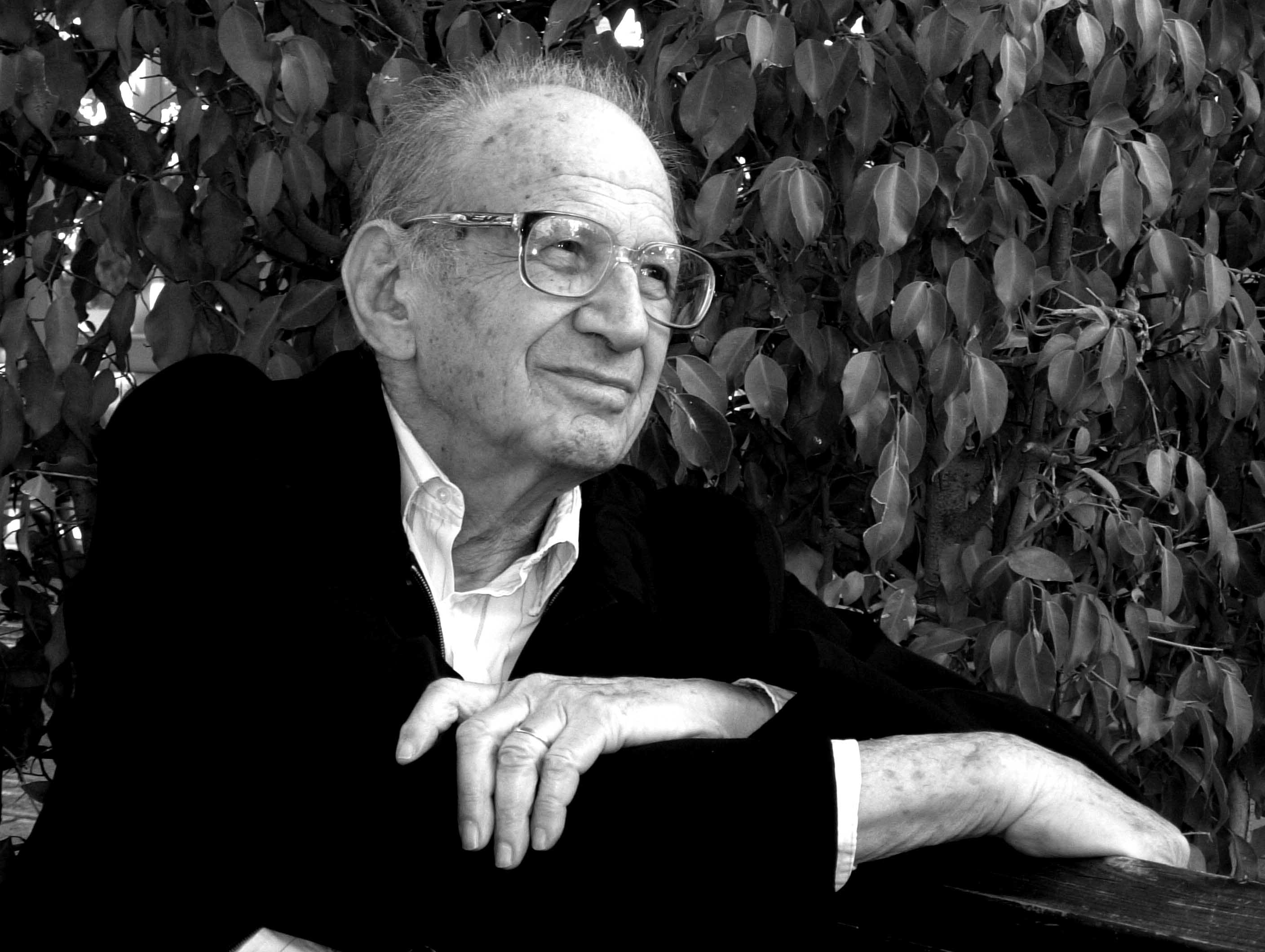
Sergiu Natra

Sergiu Natra (Hebrew: סרג'יו נטרה; 12 April 1924 – 23 February 2021) was an Israeli composer of classical music.

== Life and work ==
Natra was born in Romania as Sergiu Nadler in April 1924 into a Jewish family of Austrian, German and Czech origin. As a child he studied piano and took up music studies in 1932. He continued to study at the Jewish conservatory until 1942, and graduated from the Music Academy of Bucharest in 1954.

In 1961, Natra and his wife, Sonia, a sculptor and multidisciplinary artist, emigrated to Israel. They had two sons: Danny and Gabi. He died in February 2021 at the age of 96.

== Main works ==
Most of the composers scores were published by Natra Publications, some by IMI in Tel Aviv and some by Harposphere in Paris. Part of the composers scores, the respective recordings, books and articles are found also in libraries, such as Beit Ariela Public Library and Cultural Center (Israel), the National Library of Israel, the Library of Congress (USA) and the Harold B. Lee Library (USA).

The main source of the list is the composer's documentation and archive. Additional references are found in:
