= Symphony No. 6 (Mozart) =

1767 composition by W. A. Mozart

- by W. A. Mozart
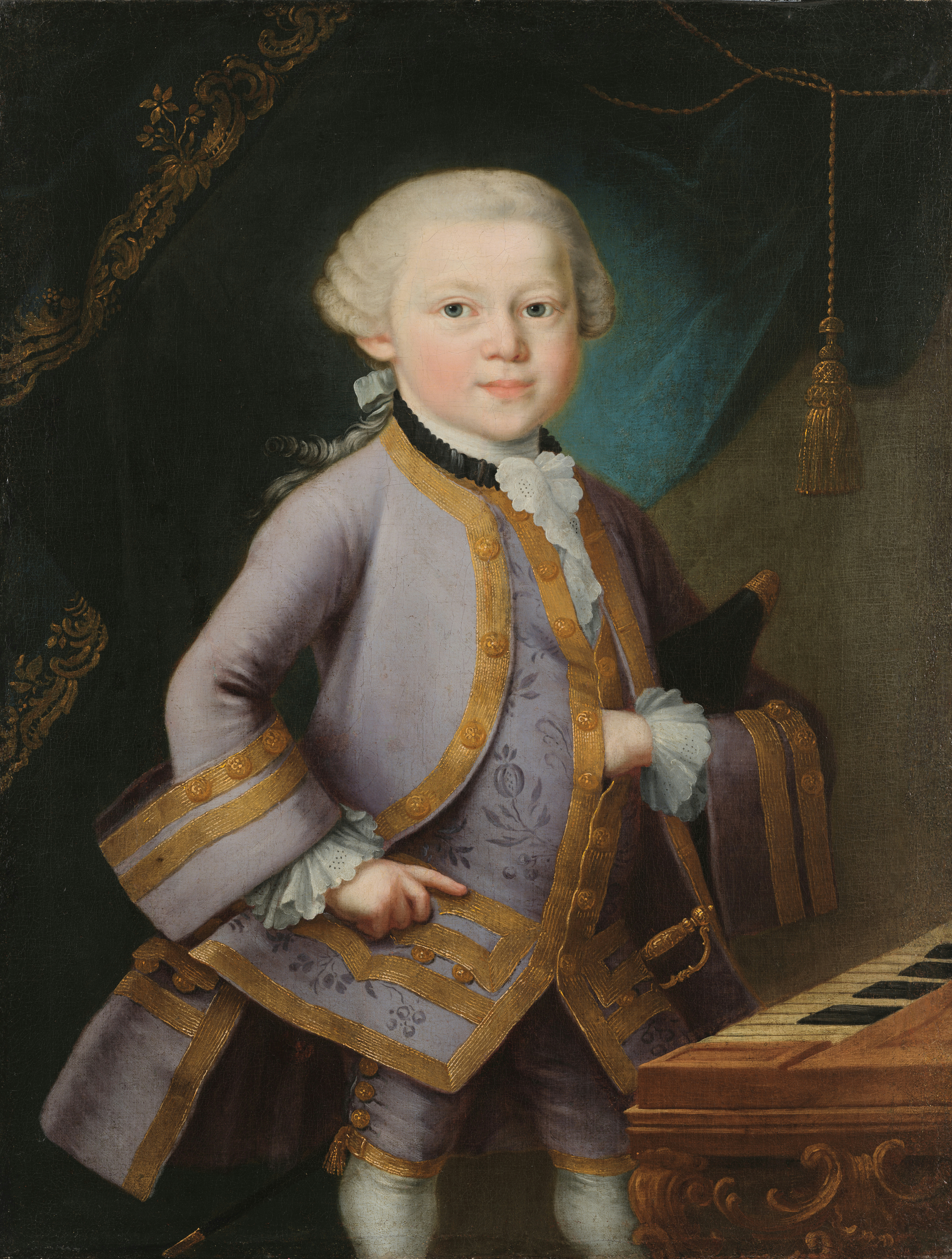
- Portrait of Mozart, 1763
- Key: F major
- Catalogue: K. 43
- Composed: 1767
- Movements: 4
- Scoring: Orchestra with continuo

Premiere
- Date: 30 December 1767
- Location: Brno
- Conductor: Wolfgang Amadeus Mozart

Symphony No. 6 in F major, K. 43, was composed by Wolfgang Amadeus Mozart in 1767 when he was eleven. According to Alfred Einstein in his 1937 revision of the Köchel catalogue, the symphony was probably begun in Vienna and completed in Olomouc, a Moravian city to which the Mozart family fled to escape a Viennese smallpox epidemic.

The symphony is in four movements. Its initial performance was at Brno on 30 December 1767. The autograph of the score is today preserved in the Jagiellonian Library in Kraków.

== Music ==
The instrumentation for the first performance was two flutes, two oboes, bassoon, two horns, strings, and continuo. The flutes are used in the second movement in place of the oboes. For the first time in a symphony, Mozart uses two obligatory viola parts.

This is Mozart's first four-movement symphony, in which he introduces the minuet and trio for the first time, a feature common in many of his symphonies thereafter. The movements are:

1. Allegro, 4/4
2. Andante, 2/4 in C major
3. Menuetto and Trio, 3/4
4. Allegro, 6/8

The Andante movement uses a theme from Mozart's early Latin opera Apollo et Hyacinthus, K. 38, in which "muted violins sing over pizzicato seconds and divided violas, a ravishing effect".

== First performance ==
The symphony was included in a concert arranged by a brother of Sigismund von Schrattenbach, Archbishop of Salzburg, given by the Mozart family (Leopold Mozart, the eleven-year-old Wolfgang Amadeus, and the fifteen-year-old Nannerl) on 30 December 1767 at the Taverna in Brno. A local clergyman recorded: "I attended a musical concert in a house in the city known as the 'Taverna', at which a Salzburg boy of eleven years and his sister of fifteen years, accompanied on various instruments by inhabitants of Brno, excited everyone's admiration."

== Discography ==
Below is an incomplete list of recordings of the symphony:

| Year | Conductor | Orchestra | Label |
|---|---|---|---|
| 1973 | Neville Marriner | Academy of St Martin in the Fields | Philips Classics |
| 1991 | Charles Mackerras | Prague Chamber Orchestra | Telarc |
| 1995 | Nicholas Ward | Northern Chamber Orchestra | Naxos |
| 2013 | Ádám Fischer | Danish National Chamber Orchestra | Dacapo Records |

== Sources ==
- Brown, A. Peter: The Symphonic Repertoire (vol. 2). Indiana University Press, Bloomington and London 2002 ISBN 025333487X.
- Kenyon, Nicholas: The Pegasus Pocket Guide to Mozart Pegasus Books, New York 2006 ISBN 1-933648-23-6.
- Zaslaw, Neal: Mozart's Symphonies: Context, Performance Practice, Reception Oxford University Press, Oxford 1991 ISBN 0-19-816286-3.
