= Symphony No. 3 (Mozart) =

Composition by C. F. Abel, formerly misattributed to W. A. Mozart

Symphony in E♭ major
- by C. F. Abel
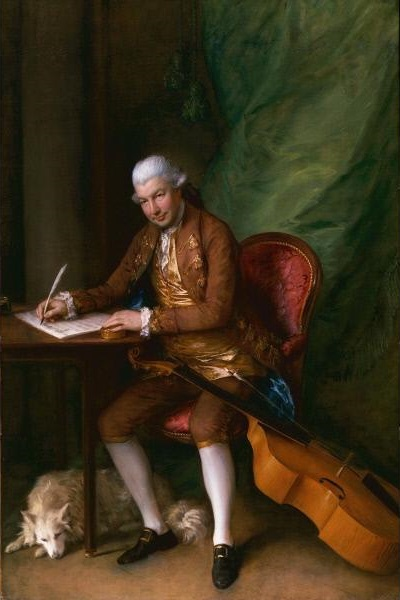
- Portrait by Gainsborough of Carl Friedrich Abel, the composer of this work, which was long misattributed to Mozart.
- Catalogue: K. 18/Anh. A 51
- Opus: 7, No. 6
- Duration: c. 13 minutes
- Movements: 3
- Scoring: Orchestra

The Symphony No. 3 in E♭ major, K. 18/Anh. A 51, formerly misattributed to Wolfgang Amadeus Mozart, is a symphony composed by Carl Friedrich Abel, a leading German composer of the earlier Classical period.

It was misattributed to Mozart because a manuscript score in the hand of Mozart was categorized as his Symphony No. 3 and was published as such in the first complete edition of Mozart's works by Breitkopf & Härtel. Later, it was discovered that this symphony was actually the work of Abel, copied by the boy Mozart (evidently for study purposes) while he was visiting London in 1764. That symphony was originally published as the concluding work in Abel's Six Symphonies, Op. 7. Mozart's copy differs from Abel's published score in that Mozart used clarinets as replacements for the oboes, perhaps because clarinets were used in the performance that Mozart attended.

== Music ==
Mozart arranged the symphony for two clarinets, bassoon, two horns in E♭, and strings.

It is in three movements:

1. Molto allegro,
2. Andante, 2/4 in C minor
3. Presto, 3/8
