= Peter Mennin =

American composer, administrator and teacher

- Born: Peter Mennini; May 17, 1923; Erie, Pennsylvania, U.S.
- Died: June 17, 1983 (aged 60) New York City, U.S.
- Occupations: Composer, teacher

Peter Mennin (born Mennini; May 17, 1923 – June 17, 1983) was a prominent American composer, teacher and administrator. In 1958, he was named Director of the Peabody Conservatory in Baltimore, and in 1962 became President of the Juilliard School, a position he held until his death in 1983. Under his leadership, Juilliard moved from Claremont Avenue to its present location at Lincoln Center. Mennin is responsible for the addition of drama and dance departments at Juilliard. He also started the Master Class Program, and brought many artists to teach including Maria Callas, Pierre Fournier and others.

== Early life and education ==
Peter Mennin was born on May 17, 1923, in Erie, Pennsylvania. Mennin was the son of Italian immigrants Amalia (née Benacci) and Attilio Mennini and the younger brother of composer Louis Mennini. Mennin started his first orchestral piece at eleven and at 18 years old, he completed the first of nine symphonies.

Mennin began his studies at the Oberlin Conservatory with Norman Lockwood when he was 16, but left in 1941 to join the U. S. Army Air Force. After two years of service, Mennin continued his studies with Howard Hanson at the Eastman School of Music, where he received his BA and master's degree in 1945.

== Career ==
Mennin wrote nine symphonies, several concertos, and numerous works for wind band, chorus, and other ensembles. His style became more chromatic and astringent with time, but was tonal and incorporated polyphony.

His Third Symphony, finished the day he turned 23 and initially written for his PhD requirements at Eastman, was positively received. The piece was performed by the New York Philharmonic the following year, and Mennin was subsequently appointed to the composition faculty of The Juilliard School. It was a runner up for the Pulitzer Prize in 1950.

Mennin was a member of the first artistic exchange with the Soviet Union in 1958, where he spent six weeks. He received two Guggenheim fellowships for Music composition, in 1949 and 1957.

All of the symphonies composed by Mennin have been recorded, with the exception of the first two symphonies, which were withdrawn. His String Quartet No 2, premiered by the Juilliard String Quartet in New York City on February 24, 1952, was subsequently recorded on Columbia Records.

His music has not regularly been performed live. The centenary of his birth was marked by the world premiere of the Aria from his unfinished Violin Concerto at the Aspen Music Festival in August 2023.

His notable students include Van Cliburn, Jacob Druckman, Richard Danielpour, Karl Korte, Charles L. Bestor, Jack Behrens, and Claire Polin. Juilliard awards an annual Peter Mennin prize for Outstanding Achievement and Leadership in Music.

== Principal works ==
=== Symphonies ===
- Symphony No. 1 (1942) withdrawn
- Symphony No. 2 (1944) (Gershwin Memorial Award, 1945) withdrawn
- Symphony No. 3 (completed May 17, 1946, his doctoral dissertation. Premiered February 1947 by the New York Philharmonic, conducted by Walter Hendl.)
- Symphony No. 4 The Cycle (1947–8) (Chorus & orchestra)
- Symphony No. 5 (1950) (commissioned and premiered by the Dallas Symphony and Walter Hendl)
- Symphony No. 6 (1953)
- Symphony No. 7 Variation-symphony (1963, pub. 1967)
- Symphony No. 8 (1973)
- Symphony No. 9 (1981)

=== Other orchestral works ===
- Folk Overture (1945)
- Fantasia for String Orchestra (1947)
- Concertato Moby Dick (1952)
- Cello concerto (1956)
- Piano concerto (1958) (commissioned by the Cleveland Orchestra for Eunice Podis; George Szell led its premiere in February 1958)
- Canto (1962; pub. 1965)
- Flute concerto (1983)
- Aria, from unfinished Violin Concerto (premiere Aspen, 2023)

=== Concert band works ===
- Canzona for band (1951)

=== Piano ===
- Five pieces (1949)
- Piano sonata (1963)

=== Choral works ===
- Four Chinese Poems (1948)
  - In the Quiet Night
  - Crossing the Han River
  - A Song of the Palace
  - The Gold Threaded Robe
- Christmas Story (1949)
- Cantata di Virtute, "The Pied Piper of Hamelin" (1969)
- Reflections of Emily (1978)

=== Chamber works ===
- String quartet #1
- String quartet #2 (1951)
- Sonata concertante, for violin and piano (1956)
