= David Diamond (composer) =

American classical composer (1915–2005)

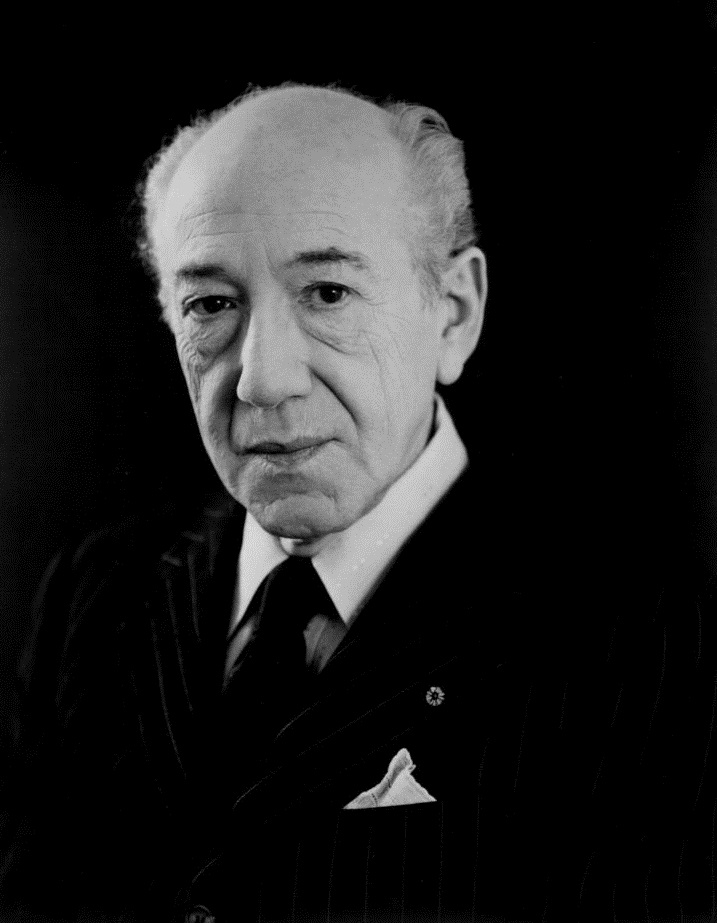
- Portrait of Diamond c. 1987
- Born: David Leo Diamond; July 9, 1915; Rochester, New York, U.S.
- Died: June 13, 2005 (aged 89); Brighton, New York, U.S.
- Occupation: Composer

David Leo Diamond (July 9, 1915 – June 13, 2005) was an American composer of classical music. He is considered one of the preeminent American composers of his generation. Many of his works are tonal or modal. His early compositions are typically triadic, often with widely spaced harmonies, giving them a distinctly American tone, but some of his works are consciously French in style. His later style became more chromatic.

== Life and career ==
He was born in Rochester, New York, and studied at the Cleveland Institute of Music and the Eastman School of Music under Bernard Rogers, also receiving lessons from Roger Sessions in New York City and Nadia Boulanger in Paris. He won a number of awards including three Guggenheim Fellowships.

Diamond's most popular piece is Rounds (1944) for string orchestra. Among his other works are eleven symphonies (the last in 1993), concertos including three for violin, eleven string quartets, music for wind ensemble, other chamber music, piano pieces and vocal music.

He composed the musical theme heard on the CBS Radio Network broadcast Hear It Now (1950–51) and its TV successor, See It Now (1951–58).

Diamond was named honorary composer-in-residence of the Seattle Symphony. He was a longtime member of the Juilliard School faculty, his notable students including Alan Belkin, Robert Black, Kenneth Fuchs, Albert Glinsky, Daron Hagen, Adolphus Hailstork, Anthony Iannaccone, Amanda Harberg, Philip Lasser, Lowell Liebermann, Alasdair MacLean, Charles Strouse, Francis Thorne, Kendall Durelle Briggs and Eric Whitacre. Diamond is also credited with advising Glenn Gould on his mid-career work, most notably his String Quartet, Op. 1.

In 1995, he was awarded the National Medal of Arts. In 1991 he was awarded the Edward MacDowell Medal.

Diamond was openly gay long before it was socially acceptable, and believed his career was slowed by homophobia and antisemitism. According to an obituary in The Guardian however, "He enjoyed enormous success in the 1940s and early '50s with champions that included Koussevitzky, Bernstein, Munch, Ormandy and Mitropoulos but, in the 1960s and '70s, the serial and modernist schools pushed him into the shadows." The New York Times similarly referred to Diamond as "a major American composer whose early brilliance in the 1940s was eclipsed by the dominance of atonal music... He was part of what some considered a forgotten generation of great American symphonists, including Howard Hanson, Roy Harris, William Schuman, Walter Piston and Peter Mennin." The New York Times also suggested that Diamond's career troubles may have also been caused by his "difficult personality... he said in the 1990 interview, 'I was a highly emotional young man, very honest in my behavior, and I would say things in public that would cause a scene between me and, for instance, a conductor.'"

In 2005, Diamond died at his home in Brighton, Monroe County, New York, from heart failure.

== Works ==
=== Ballet ===
- TOM (1936)

=== Orchestra ===
- Early discarded symphonies (No. 1 from 1933, No. 2 from 1935)
- Symphony No. 1 (1940)
- Symphony No. 2 (1942–1943)
- Symphony No. 3 (1945)
- Symphony No. 4 (1945)
- Symphony No. 5 (1947–1964)
- Symphony No. 6 (1951)
- Symphony No. 7 (1957)
- Symphony No. 8 (1958–1960)
- Symphony No. 9 (1985)
- Symphony No. 10 (1987/2000)
- Symphony No. 11 (1989–1991)
- Concerto for Small Orchestra (1940)
- Psalm (1936)
- Elegy in Memory of Ravel (1937)
- Rounds for String Orchestra (1944)
- Concert Piece for large orchestra (1939)
- Timon of Athens - A Portrait After Shakespeare (1955)
- Music for chamber orchestra
- Overture
- Heroic Piece
- The Enormous Room (1948)
- The World of Paul Klee

=== Concertante ===
- Violin Concerto No. 1 (1937)
- Concerto for Small Orchestra (1940)
- Violin Concerto No. 2 (1947)
- Violin Concerto No. 3 (1976)
- Flute Concerto (1986)
- Concerto for String Quartet and Orchestra (1996)
- Piano Concerto
- Piano Concertino
- Cello Concerto
- Kaddish for cello and orchestra (1987)
- Romeo and Juliet (1947)
- Incidental music for Romeo and Juliet (1951)

=== Wind ensemble ===
- Tantivy (1988)
- Hearts Music (1989)

=== Chamber music ===
- String Quartet No. 1 (1940)
- String Quartet No. 2 (1943–1944)
- String Quartet No. 3 (1946)
- String Quartet No. 4 (1951)
- String Quartet No. 5 (1960)
- String Quartet No. 6 (1962)
- String Quartet No. 7 (1963)
- String Quartet No. 8 (1964)
- String Quartet No. 9 (1965–1968)
- String Quartet No. 10 (1966)
- Concerto for String Quartet (1936)
- String Trio (1937)
- Quintet for Flute, Piano and String Trio (1937)
- Quartet for Piano and String Trio (1936/67)
- Partita for Oboe, Bassoon, and Piano (1935)
- Quintet for Clarinet, 2 Violas and 2 Cellos (1950)
- Piano Trio (1951)
- Wind Quintet (1958)
- Night Music, for Accordion and String Quartet (1961)
- Piano Quartet (1937 rev. 1967)
- Sonata for Violin and Piano No. 1 (1943-6)
- Sonata for Violin and Piano No. 2 (1981)
- Canticle for Violin and Piano (1946)
- Perpetual Motion for Violin and Piano (1946)
- Chaconne for Violin and Piano (1948)
- Sonata for Solo Violin
- Sonata for Cello and Piano No. 1
- Sonata for Cello and Piano No. 2 (1987)
- Sonata for Solo cello
- Concert Piece for Horn and String Trio (1978)
- Concert Piece for Flute and Harp (1989)
- Concert Piece for Viola and Piano (1994–95)
- Concerto for Two Solo Pianos (1942)
- Alto Saxophone Sonata
- Nonet for Strings
- Sonatina for Accordion

=== Piano ===
- Piano Sonata No. 1 (1947)
- Piano Sonata No. 2 (1971)
- Piano Sonatina No. 1 (1935)
- Piano Sonatina No. 2 (1987)
- Prelude and Fugue No. 1 in C major
- Prelude and Fugue No. 2 in C minor (1939)
- Prelude and Fugue No. 3 in E minor
- Prelude and Fugue No. 4 in C-sharp minor (1939)
- Prelude, Fantasy and Fugue (1983)
- A Myriologue (1935; rev. 1969)
- Gambit (1967)
- Tomb of Melville (1950)
- 8 Piano Pieces
- Album for the Young
- Two Barcarolles (1993)

=== Vocal ===
- David Mourns for Absalom (1946); text from II Samuel 18:33
- Vocalises for soprano and viola (1935, revised 1956)
- This Sacred Ground for solo baritone, choir, children's choir and orchestra (1962)
- Prayer for Peace for choir
- Many songs for solo voice with piano
