= List of compositions by Michael Haydn =

Michael Haydn

This is a list of the compositions of Michael Haydn sorted by genre, and then chronologically when year of composition is indicated, otherwise alphabetically. The numbering in parentheses starting with the capital letter P refers to Perger catalogue. The MH numbers refer to the 1993 catalogue by Charles H. Sherman and T. Donley Thomas.

== Instrumental music ==
=== Symphonies ===
All of Michael Haydn's symphonies have at least 2 oboes, 2 bassoons, 2 horns and strings. Some symphonies add more instruments, such as trumpets and timpani in some of the C major symphonies. They are usually either in three or four movements. Continuo is explicitly called for only in the earlier works, and the modern editions usually follow the old practice of putting the bassoons, basses and the left hand of the continuo on a single staff below the violas' staff.

Many of Michael Haydn's symphonies were at first attributed to Joseph Haydn. Only one of them was first attributed to Wolfgang Amadeus Mozart as his Symphony No. 37 (K. 444).

- Symphony No. 1 in C major, MH 23, Perger 35 (1758?)
- Symphony No. 1A in D major, MH 24 (1758?)
- Symphony No. 1B in F major, MH 25 (1758?)
- Symphony No. 1C in E♭ major, MH 35 (Partita), Perger 1 (1760)
- Symphony No. 2 in C major, MH 37, Perger 2 (1761)
- Symphony No. 3 in G major, MH 26 (Divertimento), (1763)
- Symphony No. 4 in B♭ major, MH 62, Perger 51 (1763)
- Symphony No. 5 in A major, MH 63, Perger 3 (1763)
- Symphony No. 6 in C major, MH 64, Perger 4 (1764)
- Symphony No. 7 in E major, MH 65, Perger 5 (1764)
- Symphony No. 8 in D major, MH 69, Perger 38 (1764)
- Symphony No. 9 in D major, MH 50, Perger 36 (1760?)
- Symphony No. 10 in F major, MH 51, Perger 45 (1764?)
- Symphony No. 11 in B♭ major, MH 82, Perger 9 (1766)
- Symphony No. 12 in G major, MH 108, Perger 7 (1768)
- Symphony No. 13 in D major, MH 132, Perger 37 (1768?)
- Symphony No. 14 in B♭ major, MH 133, Perger 52 (1771)
- Symphony No. 15 in D major, MH 150, Perger 41 (1771)
- Symphony No. 16 in A major, MH 152, Perger 6 (1771)
- Symphony No. 17 in E major, MH 151, Perger 44 (1771?)
- Symphony No. 18 in C major, MH 188, Perger 10 (1773)
- Symphony No. 19 in D major, MH 198, Perger 11 (1774)
- Symphony No. 20 in C major, MH 252, Perger 12 (1777)
- Symphony No. 21 in D major, MH 272, Perger 42 (1778)
- Symphony No. 22 in F major, MH 284, Perger 14, Sherman 23 (1779)
- Symphony No. 23 in D major, MH 287, Perger 43, Sherman 22 (1779)
- Symphony No. 24 in A major, MH 302, Perger 15 (1781)
- Symphony No. 25 in G major, MH 334, Perger 16 (1783)
- Symphony No. 26 in E♭ major, MH 340, Perger 17 (1783)
- Symphony No. 27 in B♭ major, Opus 1 No. 2, Perger 18, MH 358 (1784)
- Symphony No. 28 in C major, Opus 1 No. 3, Perger 19, MH 384 (1784)
- Symphony No. 29 in D minor, MH 393, Perger 20 (1784)
- Symphony No. 30 in D major, MH 399, Perger 21 (1785)
- Symphony No. 31 in F major, MH 405, Perger 22 (1785)
- Symphony No. 32 in D major, MH 420, Perger 23 (1786)
- Symphony No. 33 in B♭ major, MH 425, Perger 24/82 (1786)
- Symphony No. 34 in E♭ major, MH 473, Perger 26 (1788)
- Symphony No. 35 in G major, MH 474, Perger 27 (1788)
- Symphony No. 36 in B♭ major, MH 475, Perger 28 (1788)
- Symphony No. 37 in D major, MH 476, Perger 29 (1788)
- Symphony No. 38 in F major, MH 477, Perger 30 (1788)
- Symphony No. 39 in C major, MH 478, Perger 31 (1788)
- Symphony No. 40 in F major, MH 507, Perger 32 (1789)
- Symphony No. 41 in A major, MH 508, Perger 33 (1789)
- Finale to a symphony in B♭ major, MH 184
- Menuetto for symphony No. 33 in B♭ major, MH 652, Perger 82
- Symphony in C major (lost), MH A7
- Symphony in F major, MH 118a, Perger 46

=== Concertos ===
With two exceptions, it is believed all of Haydn's concerti were written in Salzburg.

- Cello Concerto in B♭ major, MH deest
- Concerto in C major for Organ and Viola, MH 41, Perger 55
- Flute Concerto No. 1 in D major, MH 81, Perger 54
- Flute Concerto No. 2 in D major, MH 105, Perger 56
- Harpsichord Concerto in F major (fragment), MH 268, Perger 57
- Horn Concerto in D major, MH 53
- Horn Concerto in D major, MH 134, Perger 134
- Trumpet Concerto No. 1 in C major, MH 60, Perger 34 (1763)
- Trumpet Concerto No. 2 in D major, MH 104
- Violin Concerto in B♭ major, MH 36, Perger 53; also Hoboken.VIIa:B1
- Violin Concerto in G major, MH 52; also Hoboken.VIIa:G1
- Violin Concerto in A major, MH 207
- Larghetto per il trombone concertato in F major, MH 61, Perger 34

=== Serenades ===
- Cassation in D major, Perger 89, MH 171
- Cassation in E♭ major, MH 54
- Cassation in E♭ major, MH 55
- Cassation in E♭ major, Perger 90, MH 208
- Divertimento in B♭ major, MH 463
- Divertimento in B♭ major, Perger 92, MH 199
- Divertimento in C major, Perger 97 (lost), MH A8
- Divertimento in D major, MH 68 (includes two concerto movements for clarinet and for trombone)
- Divertimento in D major, Perger 93, MH 319
- Divertimento in D major, Perger 95, MH 418
- Divertimento in D major, Perger 100, MH 464
- Divertimento in G major, Perger 94, MH 406
- Divertimento in G major, Perger 96, MH 518
- Divertimento (Quintet) in E♭ major (9 movements), Perger 111, MH 516 (1790), for clarinet, bassoon, horn, violin, viola
- Notturno in F major, Perger 106, MH 185
- Notturno in G major, MH 153
- Notturno solenne in E♭ major, MH deest
- Pastorello in C major, Perger 91, MH 83
- Partita in F major, Perger 107 (lost), MH 59
- Partita in A Minor, MH 251
- Serenade in D major, Perger 85, MH 407
- Serenade in D major, Perger 87, MH 86 (1767)

=== Incidental music ===
- Zaïre, Perger 13, MH 255

=== Ballets ===
- Ballet, MH 141
- Der Traum Perger 133, MH 84
- Hermann Perger 84, MH 148

=== Dances ===
- 12 Menuetti, MH 136
- 12 Menuetti, MH 197
- 12 Menuetti, MH 250
- 12 Menuetti, Perger 77, MH 550
- 12 Menuetti, Perger 78, MH 693
- 12 Menuetti, Perger 79, MH 135
- 12 Menuetti, Perger 80, MH 274
- 12 Menuetti, Perger 81, MH 193
- 2 Inglese in C major, Perger 83, MH 529
- 6 Menuetti, MH 137
- 6 Menuetti, MH 413
- 6 Menuetti, Perger 69, MH 333
- 6 Menuetti, Perger 70, MH 354
- 6 Menuetti, Perger 71, MH 414
- 6 Menuetti, Perger 73, MH 423
- 6 Menuetti, Perger 75, MH 499
- 6 Menuettini Tedeschi, Perger 72, MH 416
- 6 Menuettini Tedeschi, Perger 74, MH 424
- 6 Menuettini Tedeschi, Perger 76, MH 417
- 6 Tedeschi in G major (sketches), MH 570
- Coda to the 6 Menuettini Tedeschi P 76 in D major, MH 500

=== Marches ===
- 6 Marches (fragment), MH 288
- March in C major, Perger 61, MH 440
- March in C major, Perger 66, MH 823
- March in D major, MH 211
- March in D major, MH 432
- March in D major, Perger 58, MH 67
- March in D major, Perger 60, MH 439
- March in D major, Perger 62, MH 441
- March in D major, Perger 63, MH 339
- March in D major, Perger 64, MH 515
- March in D major, Perger 68, MH 220
- March in D major, Perger 93, MH 320
- March in F major, Perger 59, MH 421
- Marcia Turchese in C major, Perger 65, MH 601
- National-Marsch in C major, Perger 67 (lost), MH 569
- March in C major, MH 823

=== Quintets ===
- Romanze for horn quintet in F major, MH 806
- String Quintet in B♭ major, Perger 105, MH 412
- String Quintet in C major, Perger 108, MH 187
- String Quintet in F major, Perger 110, MH 367
- String Quintet in F major, Perger 112, MH 411
- String Quintet in G major, Perger 109, MH 189

=== Quartets ===
The authenticity of the six string quartets MH 308–313 is under dispute.

- Andantino for string quartet in B♭ major, Perger 136, MH 175
- Flute Quartet in D major, P 117
- Flute Quartet in F major, P deest
- Piece for string quartet in G major, MH 664
- Quartet for violin, English horn, cello and continuo in C major, Perger 115, MH 600
- String Quartet in A major, Perger 121, MH 299
- String Quartet in A major, Perger 122, MH 310
- String Quartet in B♭ major, Perger 123, MH 209
- String Quartet in B♭ major, Perger 124, MH 308
- String Quartet in B♭ major, Perger 125, MH 316
- String Quartet in C major, Perger 116, MH 313
- String Quartet in D major, MH 314
- String Quartet in E♭ major, Perger 118, MH 309
- String Quartet in F major, Perger 119, MH 312
- String Quartet in G major, MH 173a
- String Quartet in G major, MH 315
- String Quartet in G major, Perger 104, MH 172
- String Quartet in G major, Perger 135 (fragment), MH 174
- String Quartet in G minor, Perger 120, MH 311

=== Trio sonatas ===
- Divertimento à 3 in A major, MH 8
- Divertimento à 3 in B♭ major, MH 10
- Divertimento à 3 in C major, Perger 98, MH 179
- Divertimento à 3 in C major, Perger 99, MH 27
- Divertimento à 3 in D major, MH 173
- Divertimento à 3 in D major, Perger 101, MH 5
- Divertimento à 3 in E♭ major, Perger 102, MH 9
- Divertimento à 3 in E major, MH 7
- Divertimento à 3 in G major, Perger 103, MH 6
- Sonata for 2 violins and organ in B♭ major, Perger 126 (lost), MH A9

=== Duo sonatas ===
Hieronymus von Colloredo commissioned Haydn to write six duos for violin and viola. Haydn fell ill after completing the fourth, so he asked Mozart to write the other two (K. 423 and K. 424). The set of six was presented as all Haydn's, and Colloredo was unable to "detect in them Mozart's obvious workmanship".

- Duo for violin and viola in C major, Perger 127, MH 335
- Duo for violin and viola in D major, Perger 128, MH 336
- Duo for violin and viola in E major, Perger 129, MH 337
- Duo for violin and viola in F major, Perger 130, MH 338

=== Solo sonatas ===
- 6 Menuetti for violin and continuo, MH 210
- Divertimento for flute and harpsichord in G major, MH 273

=== Keyboard ===
- Allegretto in F major, MH 471
- Allegro in G major, MH 470
- Andante in C major, MH 466
- Anweisung von einem Haupt-Ton in alle übrige Töne zu kommen, MH 318
- Beispiele zur Übung im bezifferten Grundbass, MH 433
- Cadenze e versetti (fragment), MH 435
- Cadenze e versetti, Perger 131, MH 176
- Canonic studies, MH 568
- Contrapuntal studies, MH 177
- Contrapuntal studies, MH 434
- Deutscher Tanz in A major, MH 465
- Gewöhnliche Signaturen des Generalbasses, MH 317
- Menuetto in E minor, MH 472
- Menuetto in F major, MH 469
- Piece in D major, MH 467
- Piece in E♭ major, MH 468
- Preludes and Finale, MH 436
- Variations in C major, Perger 132, MH 108a
- Variations on 'Gott erhalte Franz der Kaiser', MH 771

=== Unknown instrumentation ===
- Piece in C major without title, MH 571

== Sacred vocal music ==
=== Antiphons ===
- Alma Redemptoris Mater in A major, MH 103
- Alma Redemptoris Mater in D major, MH 164
- Alma Redemptoris Mater in D major (fragment), MH 92
- Alma Redemptoris Mater in D major (K V:19a), MH 637
- Alma Redemptoris Mater in E♭ major (K V:19b), MH 270
- Alma Redemptoris Mater in F major, MH 163
- Antiphonarium Romanum, MH 533
- Ave Maris Stella in G major, MH 49
- Ave Regina in A major, MH 14
- Ave Regina in C major, MH 227
- Ave Regina in C major (K V:14a), MH 140
- Ave Regina in E♭ major, MH 127
- Ave Regina in F major, MH 457
- Ave Regina in G major (K V:14b), MH 650
- Crucem sanctam in B♭ major (K V:10), MH 201
- Deutsches Alma Redemptoris Mater in D major, MH 676
- Deutsches Ave Maris Stella in G major, MH 677
- Deutsches Regina caeli in F major (K VI:25), MH 694
- Deutsches Salve Regina in B♭ major, MH 675
- Regina caeli in B♭ major, MH 191
- Regina caeli in B♭ major, MH 264
- Regina caeli in C major (K V:15a), MH 80
- Regina caeli in C major, MH 22
- Regina caeli in C major, MH 263
- Regina caeli in D major, MH 128
- Regina caeli in E♭ major (K V:15d), MH 93
- Regina caeli in E major, MH 94
- Salve Regina, MH deest
- Salve Regina in A major (K V:13d), MH 634
- Salve Regina in B♭ major (K V:13a), MH 283
- Salve Regina in B♭ major (K V:13b3), MH 31
- Salve Regina in B♭ major, MH 20
- Salve Regina in B♭ major, MH 21
- Salve Regina in B♭ major, MH 90
- Salve Regina in B♭ major, MH 231
- Salve Regina in C major (K V:13b1), MH 29
- Salve Regina in C major (K V:13b6), MH 34
- Salve Regina in C major, MH 19
- Salve Regina in C major, MH 91
- Salve Regina in D major (K V:13b2), MH 30
- Salve Regina in D major (K V:13b5), MH 33
- Salve Regina in D major (K V:13e), MH 534
- Salve Regina in F major, MH 347
- Salve Regina in G major (K V:13b4), MH 32
- Salve Regina in G major (K V:13c), MH 129
- Sancti Dei omnes in D minor (K V:25a), MH 328
- Surgite Sancti in E♭ major (K V:9f), MH 327

=== Sacred cantatas ===
- Applicatio (K V:21), MH 279
- Canticum in Tono Peregrino (K V:20), MH 323
- Der Christ auf Golgotha in G minor, MH 831
- Die Ölberg Andacht (K VI:14), MH 625
- Jubelfeier (K VI:31), MH 449
- Amor subditorium in C major, MH 289

=== Canticles ===
- Asperges me in F major (K V:7a), MH 572
- Asperges me in F major (K V:7b), MH 573
- Asperges me in G minor, MH 98
- De Profundis in D minor (K IIb:16), MH 280
- Deutsches Te Deum in C major, MH 672
- Deutsches Te Deum in C major (K VI:19), MH 836
- Deutsches Tenebrae in E♭ major, MH 610
- Emicat meridies in F major (K IIb:4), MH 437
- Laeta quies in B♭ major (K IIb:17b), MH 400
- Laeta quies in F major (K IIb:17a), MH 253
- Lauda Sion in G major (K IIa:42), MH 215
- Libera me in B♭ major, MH 458
- Libera me in D minor, MH 431
- Libera me in E major, MH 459
- Litanei-Gesang in C major, MH 514
- Litanei-Gesang in C major (K VI:9), MH 368
- Litaniae de Beata Virgine Maria in A major, MH 258
- Litaniae de Beata Virgine Maria in A minor, MH 212
- Litaniae de Beata Virgine Maria in A minor (K IV:17b), MH 120
- Litaniae de Beata Virgine Maria in C major (K IV:16), MH 157
- Litaniae de Beata Virgine Maria in C major (K IV:17a), MH 156
- Litaniae de Beata Virgine Maria in F major, MH 282
- Litaniae de Venerabili Sacramento in B♭ major (K IV:10), MH 110
- Litaniae de Venerabili Sacramento in B♭ major (K IV:13), MH 228
- Litaniae de Venerabili Sacramento in B♭ major (K IV:15), MH 532
- Litaniae de Venerabili Sacramento in F major (K IV:14), MH 66
- Litaniae Lauretenae in B♭ major (K IV:9), MH 74
- Litaniae Lauretenae in B♭ major (K IV:9) (revised), MH 88
- Litaniae Lauretenae in C major (K IV:11), MH 71
- Litaniae Lauretenae in G major, MH 89
- Litanie della Madonna in D major (K IV:12), MH 330
- Miraculorum patrator in G major (K IIb:18), MH 426
- Pange lingua in C major (K V:12c), MH 395
- Responsoria ad Matutinum in Coena Domini (K V:9a), MH 276
- Responsoria ad Matutinum in Nativitate Domini (K V:9e), MH 639
- Responsoria in festo Corporis Christi in C major (K V:11), MH 213
- Responsoria in festo Resurrectione Domini in G major (K V:9d), MH 669
- Responsoria in Parasceve (K V:9b), MH 277
- Responsoria in Sabbato Sancto (K V:9c), MH 278
- Stella caeli in F major (K V:18), MH 394
- Stella caeli in F major (K V:18b), MH 830
- Stella coeli in F major (K V:18a), MH 306
- Tantum ergo in C major (K V:12a), MH 772
- Tantum ergo in C major (K V:12e), MH 404
- Tantum ergo in C major (K V:12i), MH 460
- Tantum ergo in C major, MH 249
- Tantum ergo in C major, MH 265
- Tantum ergo in C major, MH 396
- Tantum ergo in D minor (K V:12d), MH 130
- Tantum ergo in G major (K V:12b), MH 773
- Tantum ergo in G major (K V:12k), MH 535
- Te Deum in C major (K V:1), MH 28
- Te Deum in C major (K V:2), MH 145
- Te Deum in C major (K V:6), MH 415
- Te Deum in D major (K V:4), MH 800
- Te Deum in D major (K V:5), MH 829
- Tenebrae in A♭ major, MH 113
- Tenebrae in B♭ major (K V:8a), MH 305
- Tenebrae in C major, MH 125
- Tenebrae in C♯ major (K V:8b), MH 824
- Tenebrae in E♭ major (K V:8c), MH 162
- Veni Sancte Spiritus in C major, MH 39
- Veni Sancte Spiritus in E♭ major (K IIa:39a), MH 366
- Veni Sancte Spiritus in G major, MH 96
- Veni Sancte Spiritus in G major, MH 161
- Vidi Aquam in C major, MH 99

=== Graduals ===
- Ab ortu solis in B♭ major (K IIa:45), MH 356
- Ad Dominum, dum tribulater in C major (K IIa:46), MH 487
- Adjutor in opportunitatibus in G major (K IIa:18), MH 446
- Adjuvabit eam Deus in E♭ major (K IIb:47), MH 375
- Angelis suis in D major (K IIa:21), MH 451
- Ascendit Deus in A major (K IIa:37), MH 365
- Audi filia in F major (K IIb:31), MH 357
- Ave Maria in C major (K IIb:30), MH 388
- Beata gens in E♭ major (K IIa:60), MH 511
- Beatus vir in C major (K IIa:44), MH 410
- Beatus vir in E♭ major (K IIb:43), MH 398
- Benedicam Dominum in F major (K IIa:56), MH 492
- Benedicite Dominum in E major (K IIb:12), MH 381
- Benedicta et venerabilis in E♭ major (K IIb:29), MH 374
- Benedictus Dominus in F major (K IIa:14), MH 495
- Benedictus es Domine in B♭ major (K IIa:41), MH 369
- Benedictus es Domine in G major, MH 348
- Benedictus qui venit in B♭ major (K IIa:7), MH 391
- Bonum est confidere in A major (K IIa:59), MH 510
- Bonum est confidere in B♭ major (K IIa:58), MH 509
- Cantate Domino in A major (K IIb:36), MH 828
- Caro mea vere in F major (K IIb:44), MH 513
- Christus factus est in C minor, MH 38
- Cognoverunt discipuli in D major (K IIa:31), MH 482
- Confitebuntur caeli in D major, MH 810
- Confitebuntur caeli in D major (K IIb:20), MH 363
- Confitemini Domino in D major (K IIa:38), MH 402
- Confitemini Domino in F major (K IIa:36), MH 696
- Constitues eos principes in A major (K III:7), MH 373
- Convertere Domine in B♭ major (K IIa:50), MH 490
- Custodi me Domine in G major (K IIa:54), MH 504
- De funesta necis domo in C major, MH 456
- De profundis in D major (K IIa:67), MH 494
- Dextera Domini in A major (K IIa:33), MH 484
- Dicite in gentibus in C major (K IIb:22), MH 364
- Dilectus meus in A major (K IIb:7), MH 386
- Dilexisti justitiam in D major (K IIb:23), MH 376
- Dirigatur oratio mea in G major (K IIa:62), MH 520
- Dolorosa et lacrymabilis in C minor (K IIa:26), MH 360
- Domine Dominus noster in D major (K IIa:53), MH 491
- Domine praevenisti in C major (K IIb:46), MH 359
- Domine quis habitabit in E major (K IIb:3), MH 403
- Domine refugium in A major (K IIa:64), MH 521
- Dominus regnavit in B♭ major (K IIa:17), MH 498
- Ecce ancilla Domini in B♭ major (K IIb:5), MH 653
- Ecce quam bonum in B♭ major (K IIa:65), MH 522
- Ecce sacerdos in E minor (K IIb:42), MH 345
- Ecce Virgo concipiet in E♭ major (K IIb:6), MH 408
- Effuderunt sanguinem in D major (K IIa:12), MH 392
- Egregie Doctor Paule in B♭ major, MH 190
- Eripe me in F♯ minor (K IIa:25), MH 481
- Esto mihi in Deum in A major (K IIa:52), MH 503
- Ex Sion species in B♭ major (K IIa:2), MH 443
- Exsultabunt Sancti in G major (K IIb:13), MH 370
- Exsurge Domine in E♭ major (K IIa:23), MH 479
- Felix es sacra in F major (K IIb:11), MH 379
- Germinavit radix Jesse in G major (K V:22a), MH 651
- Gloria et honore in G major (K IIb:38), MH 526
- Gloriosus Deus in C major (K IIb:14), MH 352
- Hic est discipulus in B♭ major (K IIa:10), MH 344
- Hodie scietis in B♭ major (K IIa:5), MH 656
- In Deo speravit in C major (K IIa:55), MH 505
- In die resurrectionis in B♭ major (K IIa:30), MH 362
- In omnem terram in B♭ major (K III:17), MH 525
- Ipsa Virgo virginum in D major (K IIb:49), MH 670
- Jacta cogitatum tuum in E♭ major (K IIa:47), MH 488
- Juravit Dominus in E♭ major (K IIb:41), MH 382
- Justus ut palma in B♭ major (K IIb:45), MH 389
- Laetatus sum in B♭ major (K IIa:24), MH 480
- Laetatus sum in F major (K IIa:61), MH 519
- Laudate pueri in F major (K IIa:11), MH 342
- Laudibus mons in G major (K IIb:19), MH 556
- Liberasti nos in C major (K IIa:66), MH 523
- Locus iste in F major (K IIb:25), MH 383
- Misit Dominus verbum in A major (K IIa:15), MH 496
- Ne timeas Maria in B♭ major (K III:1), MH 409
- Nimis honorati sunt in G major (K III:16), MH 380
- Nunc dimittis in D major (K IIb:1), MH 355
- Oculi omnium in D major (K III:43), MH 401
- Omnes de Saba in G major (K IIa:13), MH 350
- Paratum cor meum in D major (K IIa:63), MH 524
- Petite et accipietis in B♭ major (K IIb:35), MH 798
- Post partum Virgo in G major (K IIb:26), MH 528
- Priusquam te formarem in C major (K IIb:8), MH 372
- Probasti Domine in F major (K IIb:39), MH 378
- Prope est Dominus in C major (K IIa:4), MH 445
- Propitius esto Domine in F major (K IIa:48), MH 489
- Protector noster in F major (K IIa:49), MH 501
- Qui sedes Domine in B♭ major (K IIa:3), MH 444
- Redemptionem misit in F major (K IIa:32), MH 483
- Regnavit Dominus in C major (K IIa:35), MH 486
- Respice Domine in G major (K IIa:57), MH 506
- Salvos fac nos in B♭ major (K IIb:2), MH 351
- Sciant gentes in G major (K IIa:19), MH 447
- Sederunt principes in G major (K IIa:9), MH 343
- Speciosus forma in G major (K IIb:24), MH 377
- Surrexit Christus in E major (K IIa:34), MH 485
- Tecum principium in G major (K IIa:6), MH 390
- Tenuisti manum in F major (K IIa:27), MH 695
- Timebunt gentes in E major (K IIa:16), MH 497
- Timete Dominum in G major (K III:14), MH 385
- Tollite portas in C major (K IIb:28), MH 387
- Tribulationes cordis mei in C major (K IIa:22), MH 453
- Tu es Deus in C major (K IIa:20), MH 448
- Tu es Petrus in C major (K IIb:9), MH 397
- Tu es vas electionis in A major (K IIb:10), MH 353
- Universi qui te in F major (K IIa:1), MH 442
- Venite filii in F major (K IIa:51), MH 502
- Victimae Paschali laudes in F major (K IIa:29), MH 361
- Viderunt omnes in F major (K IIa:8), MH 341
- Virgo prudentissima in C major (K V:23), MH 635
- Vos estis in C major (K IIb:37), MH 554

=== Hymns ===
- Dedit mihi in B♭ major, MH 77
- Deus in adjutorium in B♭ major (K IV:1c), MH 454
- Deus tuorum militum in A minor, MH 326
- Deus tuorum militum in C major, MH 158
- Ex ore infantium in C major (K I:30), MH 331
- Gaude Virgo in D major (K V:22b), MH 638
- Hymne an den Schöpfer der Natur in F major, MH 194* Iam sol recedit igneus in F major (K V:17), MH 595
- Invictus heros in A minor, MH 78
- Iste confessor in A major (K V:16), MH 40
- Jam faces lictor in F major, MH 79
- Jesu corona Virginum in A minor, MH 100
- Jesu redemptor omnium in C major (K V:25b), MH 329
- O salutaris hostia in D major, MH 101
- Salvete flores in D major (K IV:2b), MH 307
- Urbs Jerusalem in G major, MH 75
- Vexilla regis in D minor, MH 126

=== Masses ===
- Deutsches Hochamt (German Mass)
  - Deutsches Hochamt in A major (K VI:3), MH 536
  - Deutsches Hochamt in B♭ major (K VI:6c), MH 560
  - German Mass in E♭ major (K VI:6b), MH 561
  - German Mass in F major (K VI:6a), MH 562
  - Deutsches Hochamt in B♭ major (K VI:2), MH 602
  - German Mass in F major (K VI:4), MH 611
  - Deutsches Hochamt in C major (K VI:5), MH 629
  - Deutsches Hochamt in B♭ major (K VI:1) (lost), MH 642
  - German Mass in F major, MH 671
- Gloria del Signore Giuseppe Haydn, MH 596
- Gloria et Credo ad Missam Sancti Gabrielis in C major (K I:5), MH 112
- Gloria et Credo ad Missam Sancti Raphaelis in C major (K I:6), MH 111
- In coena Domini ad Missam in C major, MH 628
- In gloria Dei Patris in D major, MH 797
- Missa Beatissimae Virginis Mariae in C major, MH 15
- Missa Dolorum Beatae Virginis Mariae in A minor (K I:3) (lost), MH 57
- Missa Hispanica in C major (K I:17), MH 422
- Missa in C major, MH 44
- Missa in C major (K I:35), MH 42
- Missa in C major (lost), MH 18
- Missa in D minor (fragment), MH 2
- Missa in D minor (fragment) (K I:31a), MH 3
- Missa pro Quadragesima in F major (K I:20), MH 551
- Missa Quadragesimalis in A minor, MH 552
- Missa Sanctae Theresiae in D major (K I:22), MH 796
- Missa in honorem Sanctae Ursulae in C major (K I:18), MH 546
- Missa Sanctae Crucis in A minor (K I:16), MH 56
- Missa Sanctorum Cyrilli et Methodii in C major (K I:2), MH 13
- Missa Sancti Aloysii in B♭ major (K I:12), MH 257
- Missa Sancti Amandi in C major (K I:10), MH 229
- Missa Sancti Dominici in C major (K I:14), MH 419
- Missa Sancti Francisci Seraphici in C major (K I:25), MH 43
- Missa Sancti Francisci Seraphici in C major (K I:31b), MH 119
- Missa Sancti Francisci Seraphici in D minor (K I:23), MH 826
- Missa Sancti Gabrielis in C major, MH 17
- Missa Sancti Gotthardi in C major (K I:15), MH 530
- Missa Sancti Hieronymi in C major (K I:11), MH 254
- Missa Sancti Joannis Nepomuceni in C major (K I:9), MH 182
- Missa Sancti Josephi in C major (K I:7), MH 16
- Missa Sancti Leopoldi in G major (K I:24), MH 837
- Missa Sancti Michaelis in C major (K I:27), MH 12
- Missa Sancti Nicolai Tolentini in C major (K I:4a), MH 109
- Missa Sancti Nicolai Tolentini in C major (K I:4b), MH 154
- Missa Sancti Raphaelis in C major, MH 87
- Missa Sancti Ruperti in C major (K I:13), MH 322
- Missa Sanctissimae Trinitatis in B minor (K I:1), MH 1
- Missa tempore Quadragesimae in D minor (K I:19), MH 553

=== Motets ===
- Alleluia. Lauda Jerusalem (fragment), MH 4
- Civitatem in G major (lost), MH 47
- In Te mi Deus in C major, MH 230
- O festiva dies in C major, MH 159
- Spiritus Domini replevit in B♭ major, MH 45
- Surrexit Pastor bonus in C major, MH 160
- Vidi civitatem sanctam in C major, MH 48

=== Offertories ===
- Ad te Domine in G major (K III:3), MH 531
- Alma Dei creatoris in E♭ major (K III:2), MH 221
- Alme Deus in C major (K III:29), MH 332
- Anima nostra in D major, MH 146
- Anima nostra in G major (K III:13), MH 452
- Ave maria in F major (K III:21), MH 72
- Caelitum Joseph in F major, MH 261
- Canta Jerusalem in A major (K III:19), MH 269
- Cantate Domino in D major (lost), MH 97
- Cantate Domino in E♭ major, MH 325
- Cantate Domino in E minor (K III:44), MH 142
- Debitam morti in B♭ major (K III:20), MH 793
- Deus refugium in C major (K III:32), MH 222
- Diffusa est gratia in C major (K III:18), MH 281
- Dignare me in G major, MH 223
- Domine Deus salutis in G major (K III:22), MH 827
- Ecce Virgo suavis in C major, MH 121
- Eia corda exultate in C major (K III:39), MH 290
- Eia laeti exultemus in A major, MH 95
- Es amator in B♭ major, MH 640
- Et bracchium meum in A major, MH 116
- Ewiges Wesen in C major, MH 542
- Exaltabo te in C major (K III:25), MH 547
- Gebt acht ihr Hirten in G major, MH 216
- Grosse Frau in A major, MH 169
- Improperium expectavit in C major, MH 688
- In adoratione nostra in G major, MH 324
- In omnem terram in B♭ major (K III:41), MH 46
- Inveni David in C major, MH 115
- Inveni David in G major (K III:38), MH 224
- Justorum animae in A major (K III:37), MH 225
- Justorum animae in B♭ major, MH 286
- Laudate Dominum in C major (K III:31), MH 260
- Laudate Dominum in E♭ major (lost), MH A1
- Laudate populi in D major (K III:4), MH 792
- Lauft ihr Hirten in B♭ major, MH 217
- Leget alle Trauer in G major, MH 203
- Magnus Dominus in D minor (K III:23), MH 799
- Mutter der Gnaden in F major, MH 195
- Non me averte in B♭ major (K III:30), MH 123
- Nos conservat in D major, MH 122
- O caeli luminaria in F major (K III:8), MH 291
- O Maria in E♭ major (K III:33), MH 149
- O Maria Virgo in B♭ major, MH 165
- Perfice gressus meos in B♭ major (K III:27), MH 557
- Posuisti Domine in F major (K III:15), MH 248
- Quae est ista in C major, MH 226
- Qui nunc laeti in B minor (K III:35), MH 292
- Quicunque manducaverit in G minor (K III:9), MH 259
- Sic pater rector morum in G major (K III:36) (lost), MH A2
- Sicut servus in F major (K IIb:48), MH 143
- Steh auf in G major, MH 166
- Sub tuum praesidium in C major (K IIb:33), MH 654
- Sub tuum praesidium in C major (K IIb:34), MH 346
- Sub vestrum praesidium in F major (K III:34), MH 275
- Timete Dominum in G major, MH 256
- Tota pulchra es in D major, MH 139
- Tres sunt in C major (K IIa:40), MH 183
- Tubae resonate in C major, MH 124
- Unitis cordibus in C major, MH 293

=== Oratorios ===
- Der büssende Sünder (K VI:13), MH 147 (1771)
- Der Kampf der Busse und Bekehrung (K VI:10), MH 106 (1768)
- Der reumütige Petrus (K VI:11), MH 138 (1770)
- Der Tod Abels (Part III), MH 271
- Die Schuldigkeit des ersten Gebots (lost), MH 85
- Kaiser Constanstin I. Feldzug und Sieg, MH 117 (1769)
- Oratorio de Passione Dominum nostrum Jesu Christe, MH 202

=== Psalm settings ===
- 4 German Choral Vespers (K VI:7a-d), MH 574
- Aus Davids Psalmen und biblischen Gesängen, MH 575
- Completorium in A major (K IV:7b), MH 114
- Completorium in C major (K IV:7a), MH 815
- German Vespers for Lent in G major (K VI:8b), MH 674
- German Miserere in F major (K VI:18), MH 811
- German Dixit and Magnificat in A major (K VI:23d&b), MH 517
- German Magnificat in F major (K VI:23a), MH 673
- German Magnificat in F major (K VI:23c) (lost), MH A3
- German Miserere in F major (K VI:18), MH 592
- Dixit Dominus in D major (K IV:3), MH 809
- Laudate pueri in A minor, MH 102
- Memento Domine David in G major (K IV:2a), MH 200
- Vesperae de Confessore in A minor, MH 214
- Vesperae de Dominica in A major (K IV:4), MH 58
- Vesperae de Dominica in C major (K IV:6), MH 321
- Vesperae in A major (K IV:1b), MH 304
- Vesperae in F major (K IV:1a), MH 294
- Vesperae pro festo SS Innocentium in F major (K IV:5), MH 548

=== Requiem ===
- Missa pro Defunctis in B♭ major, MH 838
- Missa pro Defunctis in C minor, MH 559; Incorrectly attributed to Michael Haydn, written by Georg Pasterwitz (1730–1803).
- Missa pro Defuncto Archiepiscopo Sigismundo (K I:8), MH 155

=== Other ===
- Am Kircheweihfest in C major, MH 543
- Aria de Passione Domine et adventu in B♭ major, MH 131
- Aria funebris in E♭ major, MH 303
- Aria in Festis Beata Virgine Mariae, MH deest
- Auf die Auferstehung in B♭ major, MH 684
- Auf! ihr Christen in F major (K VI:20), MH 267
- Cantata de Nativitate Domini in D major, MH 262
- Dank dem Geber, Dank! in C major, MH 178
- Dankt dem Herrn in G major, MH 735
- Deinem Heiland, MH deest
- Deutscher Segen I in C major (fragment), MH 678
- Deutscher Segen II in C major (fragment), MH 679
- Deutscher Segen in B♭ major, MH 680
- Dich grüßen wir in E major, MH 301
- Dominus firmamentum in B♭ major, MH 655
- Ein träger Berg in D major, MH 196
- Erhebe o Sünder in F major, MH 266
- Erhebet euch ihr Augenlider in D major, MH 167
- Friedenslied in C major, MH 647
- Gekrönte Himmelskönigin in D major, MH 687
- Gerechter Herr in F major, MH 219
- Komm heiliger Geist in F major, MH 685
- Kommt her ihr Menschen in C major, MH 180
- Lobgesang de Venerabili Sacramento in C major (K VI:8a), MH 681
- Mutter des Lebens in F major (K VI:21), MH 555
- O glorreiche Himmel in C major, MH 168
- Rundgesang für eine Gesellschaft Studierender in A major, MH 645
- Rundgesang von Gottes Güte anstatt das Magnificat, MH 576
- Sacred piece for choir in C major (K VI:33a), MH 603
- Seele, Dein Heiland ist frei in B♭ major, MH 192
- Segne Jesu in D major (K VI:24d), MH 643
- Sei fröhlich mein Isaak in E♭ major, MH 170
- Stern auf diesem Lebensmeere in F major, MH 686
- Trauerode in C minor, MH 371
- Weihnachtslied: Heiligste Nacht in A major, MH 429
- Weihnachtslied: Heiligste Nacht in F major (K VI:28a), MH 427
- Weihnachtslied: Heiligste Nacht in G major, MH 461
- Weihnachtslied: Wie trostreich in D major (K VI:28b), MH 428
- Weihnachtslied: Wie trostreich in F major, MH 430
- Wenn ich o Schöpfer in G major, MH 567
- Wer nur den lieben Gott in C major (K VI:26), MH 682
- Wie lieblich ist doch, Herr in F major, MH 683

== Secular vocal music ==
=== Arias ===
- Ah! ingrato m'inganni in B♭ major (lost), MH 70
- Commercelied in D major, MH 558
- Duetto without text in G major, MH 545
- Freundschaft, du Zucker in F major (lost), MH 349
- Hier mahlt sie sich im Hain, MH 300
- Lied der Recruten in D major, MH 296
- Liedchen für den Feldwebel in B♭ major, MH 297
- Morgenlied der Bauern in D major, MH 298

=== Canons ===
- Canon without text in G major, MH 544
- Adam hat sieben Söhn' in F major, MH 699
- Allegremente tutti in C major, MH 232
- Amar vorrei in C major, MH 233
- Canoni voi volite in G major, MH 234
- Che viver vuol contento in G major, MH 235
- Comincio solo in C major, MH 236
- Dall' amoroso in G minor, MH 237
- Der arme Sünder in G minor, MH 700
- Die Gans bebrüht das Gänschen in B♭ major, MH 612
- Die Mässigkeit in C major, MH 709
- Die Mutter an ihr Luischen in E major, MH 801
- Dulce loquentem in E major, MH 701
- Dum loquimur in F major, MH 702
- Ecce quam bonum in C major, MH 703
- Ecce quam bonum in E♭ major, MH 814
- Ecce quam bonum in F major, MH 698a
- Ehr' sei dem Vater in C major, MH 704
- Einladung in unsern Garten zu Arnsdorf in B♭ major, MH 581
- Elle avait une beauté in A minor, MH 802
- Elle avait une beauté in C major, MH 803
- Es lebe Taddeo in G major, MH 617
- Es legte Adam sich im Paradies in A major, MH 705
- Es packe Dich in F major, MH 577
- Est! est! est! in G major, MH 706
- Fra' Matino in C major, MH 238
- Frater Caspar Decini in G major, MH 583
- Già che viene in C major, MH 239
- Glück fehl Dir in G major, MH 582
- Guten Morgen in F major, MH 206
- Hätt i glaubt in F major, MH 707
- Herzige Nani in E♭ major, MH 618
- Ich und Du in F major, MH 708
- La mia signora in A minor, MH 240
- Le son de cloche in E♭ major, MH 804
- Le vin blanc in A major, MH 805
- Mailied in D major, MH 589
- Mein Dämä, mein Fingä in F major, MH 710
- Mi foppen in C major, MH 711
- Mio ben io moro in B minor, MH 241
- O Mensch gedenk in E♭ major, MH 712
- O wie schmecket in F major, MH 713
- Per ti mio ben in A minor, MH 243
- Perchè vezzosi rai in A major, MH 242
- Plato, Cicero in F major, MH 714
- Questi son canoni in B♭ major, MH 244
- Se tu mi vuoi in C major, MH 246
- Sei sanft wie ihre Seele in E minor, MH 715
- Sei stets bescheiden in F major, MH 716
- Senza di te, ben mio in F major, MH 245
- Sie ist's nicht wert in C major, MH 717
- Sintemal und all' die Weilen in F major, MH 641
- Tauch an in E♭ major, MH 718
- Tempora mutantur in D major, MH 719
- Tre dolci e cari nomi in F major, MH 247
- Ut re mi fa in C major, MH 720
- Vinum latificat cor hominis in F major, MH 721
- Vom Glück sei alles in B♭ major, MH 619
- Vorgetan und nachgedacht in B♭ major, MH 722
- Was i beim Tag in E minor, MH 723
- Wer nicht liebt Weib in F major, MH 724
- Wer nicht liebt Wein in G major, MH 725
- Wer reines Herzens ist in G major, MH 726
- Wohlsein, Freude in C major, MH 584

=== Cantatas ===
- An Ferdinand, Kurfürst zu Salzburg (lost), MH 821
- Applausus: Amor subditorum, MH 289
- Applausus: Damon et Galathea, MH 144
- Applausus: Der fröliche Wiederschein (K VI:30), MH 527
- Attale e Erimene, MH 11
- Der deutsche Kaiser Joseph in F major, MH 512
- Der gute Hirt, MH 181
- Gelegenheits-Cantate: Patritius, MH 668
- Grabet mit fleissigen Händen in C minor (K VI:22), MH 636
- Hochzeitlied in G major, MH 607
- Nach dem Abzuge der Franzosen (keyboard), MH 795
- Nach dem Abzuge der Franzosen (orchester), MH 794
- Ninfe in belli semplicete, MH 73
- Schäffer-Kantate, MH 455

=== Part-songs ===
- Abendempfindung in D major, MH 728
- Abendlied in G major, MH 784
- Abschied eines Biedermannes in C major, MH 787
- Am Grabe in B♭ major, MH 729
- An alle Deutsche in E♭ major, MH 775
- An Decini in C major, MH 613
- An den Hain zu Aigen in C major, MH 832
- An den Herrn von Moll in E♭ major, MH 834
- An die Freude in C major, MH 739
- An die Sonne in E♭ major, MH 730
- An Ignatia in D major, MH 599
- An unsern Garten in D major, MH 604
- Auf den Tod eines Hündchens in C major, MH 812
- Bierlied in F major, MH 780
- Chor beim Vögelfangen in B♭ major, MH 727
- Commercelied in D major, MH 822
- Coppia si tenera in A major, MH 689
- Coppia si tenera in A major (improved version), MH 690
- Dankesempfindung in C major, MH 630
- Das Gebet in G minor, MH 627
- Das Kammerfenster in G major, MH 749
- Das Landleben in B♭ major, MH 782
- Das Liedchen von der Ruh in A major, MH 579
- Der Arme in F major, MH 731
- Der Bund in D major, MH 734
- Der Invalid an sein Holzbein in G minor, MH 817
- Der Invalid an seinen Fleischtopf in G major, MH 774
- Der Morgen im Lenz in F major, MH 758
- Der Obersulzer Wein in A major, MH 697
- Der Sänger in E♭ major, MH 785
- Der Wechsel in A major, MH 770
- Die alten und heutigen Sitten in F major, MH 564
- Die Biene in E♭ major, MH 733
- Die Elfen in A major, MH 665
- Die Feierabendstunde in G major, MH 820
- Die Schweitzer in E major, MH 692
- Die Unschuld an Nanette in F major, MH 580
- Die verlassene Mutter am Strome in E major, MH 818
- Die Wiedergenesung in F major, MH 698
- Ehrenlied in A major, MH 624
- Ein Lied von der Behutsamkeit in D major, MH 753
- Ein Lied von der Geduld in F major, MH 755
- Eintracht in F major, MH 737
- Einweihung in B♭ major, MH 597
- Ermunterungslied in C major, MH 666
- Es kann ja nicht immer so bleiben in A major, MH 738
- Freundchaft! wie heilig in D major, MH 740
- Freundschaftslied in F major, MH 615
- Freundschaftslied in G major, MH 667
- Friedenslied in C major, MH 644
- Frühlingslied in G major, MH 620
- Gesund und frohen Mutes in C major, MH 742
- Gott erhalte Franz den Kaiser in G major, MH 825
- Grabe, Spaden! in C major, MH 743
- Herbstlied in G minor, MH 744
- Holde Sittsamkeit in B♭ major, MH 745
- Hymne an Gott in B♭ major, MH 588
- Ja, Dämon in F major, MH 747
- Josephe in A major, MH 788
- Jugendglück in G major, MH 748
- Lebensweisheit in A major, MH 752
- Lied der Freiheit in D major, MH 608
- Lied im Grünen in G major, MH 659
- Lob des Sanges in G major, MH 816
- Meine Grille in F major, MH 756
- Meiner Freunde Gesinnungen in D major, MH 614
- Mit frommen Eifer in C major, MH 539
- Monsieur Hans in E♭ major, MH 657
- Nacht und Still' in A♭ major, MH 759
- Pein der Liebe in C major, MH 761
- Sagt wo sind die Veilchen in G major, MH 632
- Schön ist das Leben in F major, MH 646
- Sehnsucht nach dem Landleben in C major, MH 833
- Sehnsucht nach Liebe in A major, MH 648
- Seufzer in A major, MH 765
- Silenzio facciasi in B♭ major, MH 691
- Singt heilig in E major, MH 565
- Ständchen in A major, MH 594
- Ständchen in E♭ major (3 parts), MH 777
- Ständchen in E♭ major (4 parts), MH 778
- Stille! Stille! in G major, MH 766
- Tauch an mein lieba Schiffmann in G major (lost), MH A6
- Tischgebet aus der Schöpfung in E♭ major, MH 791
- Tischgebet in B♭ major, MH 768
- Tischlied in C major, MH 585
- Trinklied im Freien in F major, MH 790
- Trinklied im Winter in A major, MH 590
- Trinklied in B♭ major, MH 661
- Trinklied in B♭ major (revised version), MH 662
- Trinklied in C major, MH 769
- Trinklied in E major, MH 622
- Türkisches Kriegslied in F major, MH 649
- Türkisches Kriegslied in F major (improved version), MH 663
- Verwandlungen in G major, MH 591
- Von ihr in D major, MH 781
- Was ists dass ich mich in C major, MH 540
- Zu ihr! Zu ihr! in A major, MH 776

=== Operas ===
- Andromeda e Perseo, MH 438

=== Serenatas ===
- Endimione, MH 186

=== Singspiele ===
- Beschluss-Arie in C major, MH 295
- Das Hahnenangeschrei (lost), MH A4
- Der Bassgeiger zu Wörgl, MH 205
- Der englische Patriot, MH 285
- Der Schulmeister, MH 204
- Die Ährenleserin, MH 493
- Die Hochzeit auf der Alm, MH 107
- Die Hochzeit auf der Alm (supplemental music), MH 218
- Die Wahrheit der Natur, MH 118
- Rebekka als Braut (K VI:17), MH 76
- Tändlmarkt (lost), MH A5

=== Songs ===
- An den Herrn von Moll in E♭ major, MH 835
- An Ignatia in D minor, MH 566
- An unsern Garten in D major, MH 605
- Auch die Sprödeste der Schönen in F major, MH 462
- Auf den Tod des Herrn Schachtners in G major, MH 598
- Auf den Tod eines Hündchens in C major, MH 813
- Das Liedchen von der Ruh in A major, MH 587
- Der Arme in F major, MH 732
- Der couragierte Schneidergesell in C major, MH 807
- Der frühe Bund in B♭ major, MH 586
- Der Sänger in E♭ major, MH 786
- Der Tanzbär in A major, MH 767
- Die alten und heutigen Sitten in F major, MH 563
- Die Feierabendstunde in G major, MH 549
- Die Rose in F major, MH 762
- Die Seligkeit der Liebe in A major, MH 783
- Die verlassene Mutter am Strome in E major, MH 819
- Ein Lied zur Prüfung für Schulkinder in B♭ major, MH 754
- Einladung zum Landleben in E major, MH 736
- Einweihung in B♭ major, MH 606
- Feuer zu werden in D major, MH 450
- Freundschaftslied in F major, MH 616
- Frühlingslied in G major, MH 621
- Gehorsam ist die erste Pflicht in G major, MH 741
- Glückwunsch in F major, MH 578
- Gott! vor Dir in C major, MH 537
- Ich bin ein Mädchen aus Schwaben in F major, MH 746
- Josephe in A major, MH 789
- Komm lieber Mai in C major, MH 750
- Könnt' ich mein Liebchen kaufen in A major, MH 751
- Lied der Freiheit in D major, MH 609
- Lied im Grünen in G major, MH 660
- Mein Vergnügen in B♭ major, MH 757
- Mit frommen Eifer in C major, MH 538
- Monsieur Hans in E♭ major, MH 658
- Nichts ist schlauer als die Liebe in G major, MH 760
- Rose, lass Dich küssen in F major, MH 763
- Sagt wo sind die Veilchen in G major, MH 631
- Sauf, Du alter Gassenschlängel in F major, MH 808
- Scherzend unter Necktar-Küssen in D major, MH 764
- Schon grünen die Hecker in A major, MH 633
- Ständchen in A major, MH 593
- Ständchen in E♭ major, MH 779
- Tischlied in G major, MH 626
- Trinklied in E major, MH 623
- Was ists dass ich mich in C major, MH 541
