= Perger-Verzeichnis =

Catalogue of instrumental compositions by Michael Haydn

Portrait of Michael Haydn by Franz Xaver Hornöck

The Perger-Verzeichnis ("Perger‘s Catalogue") is a thematic-chronological catalogue of instrumental compositions by Michael Haydn, compiled by Lothar Perger in 1907. Like Ludwig von Köchel's catalog of Mozart's compositions (the Köchel-Verzeichnis), Perger's catalog uses a single range of numbers, from 1 to 136, but like Hoboken's catalog of Joseph Haydn's music, groups the pieces first into categories (symphonies, concertos, etc.) and then sorts them chronologically.

Perger's attempt at figuring out the chronology is, however, so full of mistakes (including the attribution to Haydn of music by others) that later musicologists, instead of trying to amend the catalog (as they have with Köchel's) have created new ones from scratch. The most credible is the one by Charles Sherman and T. Donley Thomas, a chronological catalog of 838 pieces in which each piece is assigned an MH number in that range according to their best guesses at chronology.

Even so, Perger's catalog is still widely used by libraries, music publishing houses and some record companies.

For a more complete listing of Michael Haydn's instrumental and vocal music, see list of compositions by Michael Haydn. The following list only includes those pieces with a Perger number, even when they're not by Haydn. See also Klafsky-Verzeichnis.

== Symphonies ==
Perger numbered the symphonies from 1 to 52, but he included suites from incidental music by Haydn compiled into symphonies by someone else, as well as three symphonies altogether written by others. However, Perger overlooked a divertimento in G major that is sometimes called a symphony.

- Symphony No. 1C in E♭ major, MH 35, Perger 1 (1760)
- Symphony No. 2 in C major, MH 37, Perger 2 (1761)
- Symphony No. 5 in A major, MH 63, Perger 3 (1763)
- Symphony No. 6 in C major, MH 64, Perger 4 (1764)
- Symphony No. 7 in E major, MH 65, Perger 5 (1764)
- Symphony No. 16 in A major, MH 152, Perger 6 (1771)
- Symphony No. 12 in G major, MH 108, Perger 7 (1768)
- Introduction to the cantata "Der gute Hirt", Perger 8 (1772)
- Symphony No. 11 in B♭ major, MH 82, Perger 9 (1766)
- Symphony No. 18 in C major, MH 188, Perger 10 (1773)
- Symphony No. 19 in D major, MH 198, Perger 11 (1774)
- Symphony No. 20 in C major, MH 252, Perger 12 (1777)
- Incidental music from Zaïre, MH 255, Perger 13 (1777)
- Symphony No. 22 in F major, MH 284, Perger 14, Sherman 23
- Symphony No. 24 in A major, MH 302, Perger 15
- Symphony No. 25 in G major, MH 334, Perger 16, K. 444 (1783)
- Symphony No. 26 in E♭ major, MH 340, Perger 17 (1783)
- Symphony No. 27 in B♭ major, Opus 1 No. 2, Perger 18, MH 358
- Symphony No. 28 in C major, Opus 1 No. 3, Perger 19, MH 384
- Symphony No. 29 in D minor, MH 393, Perger 20 (1784)
- Symphony No. 30 in D major, MH 399, Perger 21 (1785)
- Symphony No. 31 in F major, MH 405, Perger 22 (1785)
- Symphony No. 32 in D major, MH 420, Perger 23 (1786)
- Symphony No. 33 in B♭ major, MH 425, Perger 24, without the Minuet (which is Perger 82) (1786)
- Sinfonia from Andromeda e Perseo, MH 438, Perger 25 (1787)
- Symphony No. 34 in E♭ major, MH 473, Perger 26 (1788)
- Symphony No. 35 in G major, MH 474, Perger 27 (1788)
- Symphony No. 36 in B♭ major, MH 475, Perger 28 (1788)
- Symphony No. 37 in D major, MH 476, Perger 29 (1788)
- Symphony No. 38 in F major, MH 477, Perger 30 (1788)
- Symphony No. 39 in C major, MH 478, Perger 31 (1788)
- Symphony No. 40 in F major, MH 507, Perger 32 (1789)
- Symphony No. 41 in A major, MH 508, Perger 33 (1789)
- Concerto for trumpet and trombone, MH 60/61, Perger 34 (1763)
- Symphony No. 1 in C major, MH 23, Perger 35 (1758?)
- Symphony No. 9 in D major, MH 50, Perger 36 (1760?)
- Symphony No. 13 in D major, MH 132, Perger 37 (1768?)
- Symphony No. 8 in D major, MH 69, Perger 38 (1764)
- A symphony by someone else, Perger 39
- A symphony by someone else, Perger 40
- Symphony No. 15 in D major, MH 150, Perger 41 (1771)
- Symphony No. 21 in D major, MH 272, Perger 42 (1778)
- Symphony No. 23 in D major, MH 287, Perger 43, Sherman 22
- Symphony No. 17 in E major, MH 151, Perger 44 (1771?)
- Symphony No. 10 in F major, MH 51, Perger 45 (1764?)
- Suite from Die Wahrheit der Natur, MH 118, Perger 46 (1769?), sometimes called a symphony in F major
- Suite from Rebekka als Braut, MH 76, Perger 47 (1766)
- A symphony by someone else, Perger 48
- A symphony by someone else, Perger 49
- A symphony by Georg Christoph Wagenseil, Perger 50
- Symphony No. 4 in B♭ major, MH 62, Perger 51 (1763)
- Symphony No. 14 in B♭ major, MH 133, Perger 52 (1771)

== Concertos ==
Perger overlooked a violin concerto in G major, MH 52, while the horn concerto he placed in a miscellaneous category at the end.

- Violin Concerto in B♭ major, MH 36, Perger 53
- Flute Concerto No. 1 in D major, MH 81, Perger 54
- Concerto in C major for Organ and Viola, MH 41, Perger 55
- Flute Concerto No. 2 in D major, MH 105, Perger 56
- Harpsichord Concerto in F major (fragment), MH 268, Perger 57

== Marches ==
- March in D major, Perger 58, MH 67
- March in F major, Perger 59, MH 421
- March in D major, Perger 60, MH 439
- March in C major, Perger 61, MH 440
- March in D major, Perger 62, MH 441
- March in D major, Perger 63, MH 339
- March in D major, Perger 64, MH 515
- Marcia Turchese in C major, Perger 65, MH 601
- March in C major, Perger 66, MH 823
- National-Marsch in C major, Perger 67 (lost), MH 569
- March in D major, Perger 68, MH 220

== Minuets ==
For the most part these are collections of minuets that can be played on their own. Because Haydn wrote a minuet to symphony No. 33 long after the rest of the symphony, Perger mixed this minuet up with the free-standing pieces.

- 6 Menuetti, Perger 69, MH 333
- 6 Menuetti, Perger 70, MH 354
- 6 Menuetti, Perger 71, MH 414
- 6 Menuettini Tedeschi, Perger 72, MH 416
- 6 Menuetti, Perger 73, MH 423
- 6 Menuettini Tedeschi, Perger 74, MH 424
- 6 Menuetti, Perger 75, MH 499
- 6 Menuettini Tedeschi, Perger 76, MH 417
- 12 Menuetti, Perger 77, MH 550
- 12 Menuetti, Perger 78, MH 693
- 12 Menuetti, Perger 79, MH 135
- 12 Menuetti, Perger 80, MH 274
- 12 Menuetti, Perger 81, MH 193
- Menuetto for symphony No. 33 in B♭ major, MH 652, Perger 82

== Inglese ==
- 2 Inglese in C major, Perger 83, MH 529

== Ballo ==
- Ballet-Pantomime "Herman", Perger 84

== Serenades ==
- Serenade in D major, Perger 85, MH 407
- A serenade by someone else, Perger 86
- Serenade in D major, Perger 87, MH 86
- A serenade by someone else, Perger 88

== Cassations ==
- Cassation in D major, Perger 89, MH 171
- Cassation in E♭ major, Perger 90, MH 208

== Pastorello ==
- Pastorello in C major, Perger 91, MH 83

== Divertimenti ==
- Divertimento in B♭ major, Perger 92, MH 199
- Divertimento in D major, Perger 93, MH 319, includes a march in D major, MH 320
- Divertimento in G major, Perger 94, MH 406
- Divertimento in D major, Perger 95, MH 418
- Divertimento in G major, Perger 96, MH 518

== Nocturnes ==
Though Perger called them nocturnes, some of these are more generally known as divertimenti. The list even includes a string quartet and a quintet.

- Divertimento in C major, Perger 97 (lost), MH A8
- Divertimento à 3 in C major, Perger 98, MH 179
- Divertimento à 3 in C major, Perger 99, MH 27
- Divertimento in D major, Perger 100, MH 464
- Divertimento à 3 in D major, Perger 101, MH 5
- Divertimento à 3 in E♭ major, Perger 102, MH 9
- Divertimento à 3 in G major, Perger 103, MH 6
- String Quartet in G major, Perger 104, MH 172
- String Quintet in B♭ major, Perger 105, MH 412
- Notturno in F major, Perger 106, MH 185

== Partita ==
- Partita in F major, Perger 107 (lost), MH 59

== Quintets ==
- String Quintet in C major, Perger 108, MH 187
- String Quintet in G major, Perger 109, MH 189
- String Quintet in F major, Perger 110, MH 367
- String Quintet in E♭ major, Perger 111, MH 516
- String Quintet in F major, Perger 112, MH 411
- A quintet by someone else, Perger 113
- A quintet by someone else, Perger 114

== Quartets ==
- Quartetto for violin, English horn, cello & continuo in C major, Perger 115, MH 600
- String Quartet in C major, Perger 116, MH 313
- Flute Quartet in D major, P 117, P 117
- String Quartet in E♭ major, Perger 118, MH 309
- String Quartet in F major, Perger 119, MH 312
- Flute Quartet in F major, P deest, P deest
- Piece for string quartet in G major, MH 664
- String Quartet in G minor, Perger 120, MH 311
- String Quartet in A major, Perger 121, MH 299
- String Quartet in A major, Perger 122, MH 310
- String Quartet in B♭ major, Perger 123, MH 209
- String Quartet in B♭ major, Perger 124, MH 308
- String Quartet in B♭ major, Perger 125, MH 316

== Sonatas ==
Hieronymus Graf von Colloredo commissioned Haydn to write six duos for violin and viola. Haydn fell ill after completing the fourth, so he asked Mozart to write the other two (K. 423 and K. 424). The set of six was presented as all Haydn's, and Colloredo was unable to "detect in them Mozart's obvious workmanship." With these Perger lumped a sonata for two violins and organ.

- Sonata for 2 violins & organ in B♭ major, Perger 126 (lost), MH Appendix 9
- Duo for violin and viola in C major, Perger 127, MH 335
- Duo for violin and viola in D major, Perger 128, MH 336
- Duo for violin and viola in E major, Perger 129, MH 337
- Duo for violin and viola in F major, Perger 130, MH 338

== Preludes ==
- Cadenze e versetti, Perger 131, MH 176

== Miscellaneous and fragments ==
- Der Traum, Perger 133, MH 84
- Horn Concerto in D major, Perger 134, MH 134
- String Quartet in G major, Perger 135 (fragment), MH 174
- Andantino for string quartet in B♭ major, Perger 136, MH 175
