= List of symphonies in G major =

This is a list of symphonies in G major written by notable composers.

Composer	Symphony
Carl Friedrich Abel	Symphony/Overture in G major, Op. 1 No. 5, D36/E6 (1759?); Symphony/Overture in G major, Op. 4 No. 5, D36/E11 (1762); Symphony in G major, Op. 7 No. 1, E13 (1767); Symphony/Overture in G major, Op. 14 No. 5, E29; Sinfonia in G major, Op. 17 No. 6, E36 (1783)
Edmund Angerer	Toy Symphony
Carl Philipp Emanuel Bach	Symphony in G major, Wq.173 / H648 (1741); Symphony in G major, Wq.180 / H655 (1758, rev. later); Symphony in G major, Wq.182:1 / H657 (1773); Symphony in G major, Wq.183:4 / H666 (1775); Symphony in G major, Kast 69 / H 667 (1751?, collaborative work with Count Ferdinand of Lobkowitz; lost)
Johann Christian Bach	Symphony, Op. 3 No. 6 / W C6; Symphony, Op. 6 No. 1 / W C7a; Symphony, W C7b; Symphony, Op. 8 No. 2 / W C13
Franz Ignaz Beck	Sinfonia, op. 1 no. 5, Callen 5 (published 1758)
Luigi Boccherini	Symphony G576
Hjalmar Borgstrøm	Symphony No. 1, Op. 5 (1890)
Alan Bush	Symphony No. 2 "The Nottingham Symphony", Op. 33 (1949)
Christian Cannabich	Sinfonia (1760); Sinfonia, Op. 10 No. 2 (by 1772); Sinfonia, no. 67
Muzio Clementi	Symphony "no. 3" Grand National Symphony (incomplete)
Eric DeLamarter	Symphony (1920)
Felix Draeseke	Symphony No. 1, Op. 12 (1868–69, rev. 1871–72)
Antonín Dvořák	Symphony No. 8, Op. 88, B. 163 (1889)
George Dyson	Symphony (1937)
Jean Françaix	Symphony in G (1953)
François Joseph Gossec	Symphony, Op. 12 No. 2, RH 36 (published 1769)
Theodore Gouvy	Symphony, Op. 58 (Symphonie brève; variations et rondo pour orchestre)
Christoph Graupner	Symphonies GWV 578–611 (see List of symphonies by Christoph Graupner)
Friedrich Gulda	Jazz Symphony (1970)
Asger Hamerik	Symphony No. 6 "Symphonie spirituelle", Op. 38 (1897)
Joseph Haydn	Symphony No. 3 (1762); Symphony No. 8 Le Soir (1761); Symphony No. 18 (1766); Symphony No. 23 (1764); Symphony No. 27 (1766); Symphony No. 47 "Das Palindrom" (1772); Symphony No. 54 (1774); Symphony No. 81 (1784); Symphony No. 88 (late 1780s); Symphony No. 92 "Oxford" (1791); Symphony No. 94 "Surprise" (1791); Symphony No. 100 "Military" (1794)
Michael Haydn	Symphony No. 1C, MH 26 (1758); Symphony No. 3 (1763, also known as Divertimento); Symphony No. 12, MH 108, Perger 7 (1768); Symphony No. 25, MH 284, Perger 16 (1783). Formerly attributed to Mozart as Symphony No. 37, K. 444; Symphony No. 35, MH 474, Perger 27 (1788)
Friedrich Koch	Symphony No. 2, Op. 10 (published 1891)
Leopold Kozeluch	Symphony, Op. 24 No. 3, P I: 8; Symphony, P I: G1
Gustav Mahler	Symphony No. 4 (1899-1900)
John Marsh	Symphony No. 8 [9] (1778)
Wolfgang Amadeus Mozart	Symphony No. 10, K. 74; Symphony No. 12, K. 110; Symphony No. 15, K. 124 (1772); Symphony No. 17, K. 129 (1772); Symphony No. 27, K. 199 (1773); Symphony No. 32 "Overture in the Italian style", K. 318 (1779)
Ole Olsen	Symphony in G, Op. 5 (1875-78)
George Onslow	Symphony No. 4, Op. 71 (1846)
Carlo d'Ordoñez	Symphony, Bryan G0
Hubert Parry	Symphony No. 1 (c. 1880–82)
Hans Pfitzner	Little Symphony, Op. 44 (1946)
Ignaz Pleyel	Symphony, Ben.130; Symphony Ben.156/op. 68 (1804)
Napoléon Henri Reber	Symphony No. 4 (by 1850)
Anton Reicha	Symphony No. 1 (ca. 1808)
Jean Rivier	Symphony No. 3 for strings (1938), pub. 1939
Chevalier de Saint-Georges	Symphony Op. 11 No. 1 G.73
Vadim Salmanov	Symphony No. 2 (1959)
Louis Spohr	Symphony No. 6 "Historical Symphony in the Style and Taste of Four Different Periods", Op. 116 (1839); Symphony No. 8, Op. 137 (1847)
Alice Mary Smith	Symphony in G major
Johann Stamitz	Symphony, Op. 3 No. 1, Wolf G2 (c. 1751–54; published 1757); Symphony, Op. 3 No. 3, Wolf G3 (c. 1751–54; published 1757); Symphony, Op. 8 No. 3, Wolf G5 (c. 1745–49; published 1763)
Johann Baptist Wanhal	Symphony, Bryan G1; Symphony, Bryan G2; Symphony, Bryan G4; Symphony, Bryan G6; Symphony, Bryan G8; Symphony, Bryan G10; Symphony, Bryan G11; Symphony, Bryan G13
Felix Weingartner	Symphony No. 1, Op. 23 (1898-99)
Johann Christoph Friedrich Bach	Symphony in G major, BR-JCFB C 12 / Wf I/7 (ca. 1770, lost); Symphony in G major, BR-JCFB C 23 / Wf I/15 (ca. 1792)
Ralph Vaughan Williams	Symphony No. 2 ("A London Symphony")
