= Symphony No. 23 (Michael Haydn) =

Portrait of Michael Haydn by Franz Xaver Hornöck

Michael Haydn's Symphony No. 23 in D major, Perger 43, Sherman 22, Sherman-adjusted 23, MH 287, is believed to have been written in Salzburg around 1779. This symphony was incorrectly attributed to Wolfgang Amadeus Mozart by Ludwig von Köchel with the number K. 291, on the basis of a fragment of manuscript which Mozart copied, apparently to help him study the fugue form of the final movement.

The symphony is scored for two oboes, two bassoons, two horns, and strings. It is in three movements:

1. Allegro assai
2. Andantino, in D minor, changing to D major at measure 65
3. Fugato. Presto mà non troppo

The slow movement begins in D minor, without winds at first.

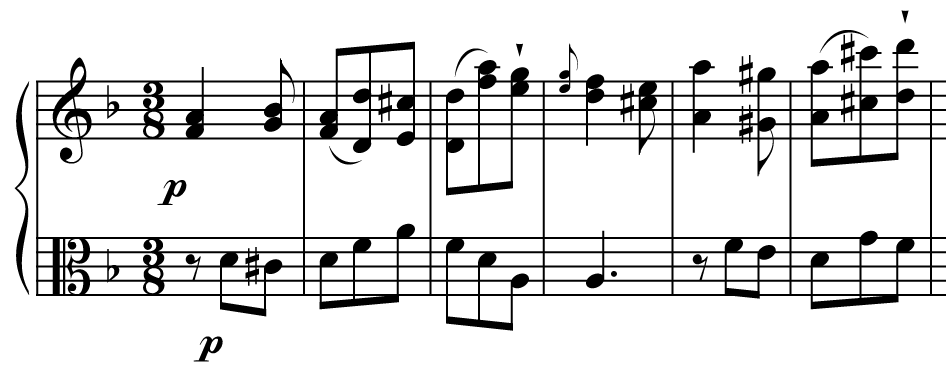

The oboes and horns come in with the change to D major.

The third movement was at first mistaken by Köchel for a work of Mozart's. Mozart did in fact copy out the first 45 measures of it (Simon Sechter completed the score of the finale). Some time afterwards, he wrote his String Quartet in G major, K. 387, with a finale that is also a fugato and also begins with a theme consisting of four whole notes first stated by the second violin.

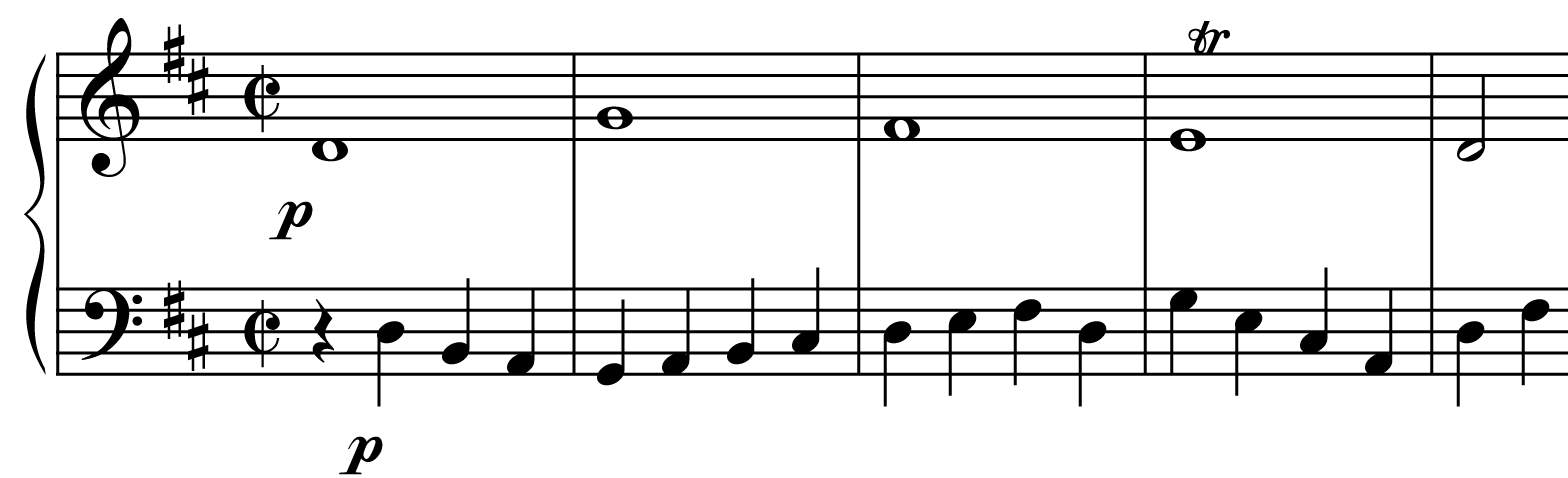

Having the first 45 measures in Mozart's hand, it was natural for Köchel to assume that Mozart was the author.

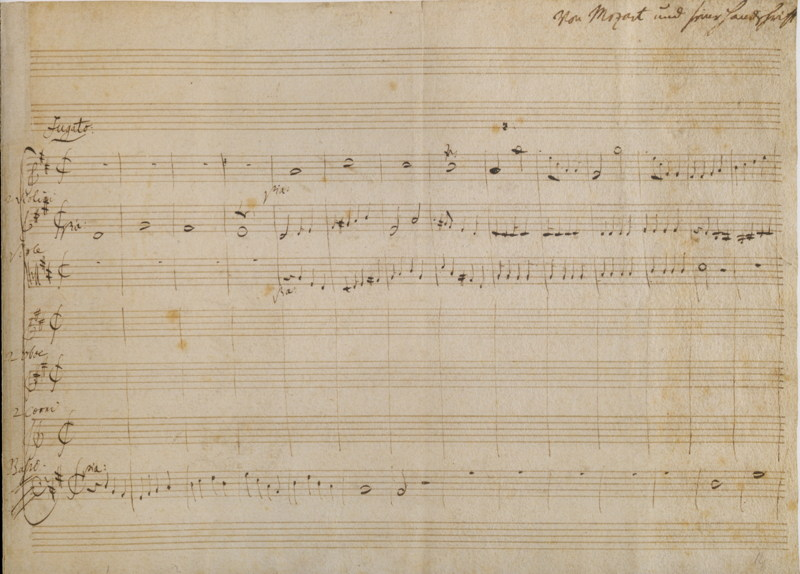
Mozart's copy of the fugato

This symphony is one of the few by Michael Haydn to have a slow movement in a minor key (the others are No.s 6, 9 and 20) though in this one the D minor key signature changes to D major around the middle for the rest of the movement. Horns in D are used throughout, and in the fugal finale they even get to play the fugue subject a couple of times.

== Discography ==
This symphony is available on a VoxBox 2-disc set together with seven other symphonies, and on the CPO label on a CD with Symphonies No.s 1C, 22 and 33, conducted by Johannes Goritzki, who in the first movement adds an exposition repeat not indicated by the Sherman edition.
