= List of symphonies in A major =

This is a list of symphonies in A major. It includes all symphonies in the key of A major written by notable composers.

Composer	Symphony
Carl Friedrich Abel	Symphony in A major, Op. 10 No. 6, E24 (published 1771)
Anton Arensky	Symphony No. 2, Op. 22 (1889)
Carl Philipp Emanuel Bach	Symphony in A major, Wq.182:4 / H660 (1773)
Franz Ignaz Beck	Sinfonia, Op. 1, No. 3, Callen 3 (published 1758); Sinfonia, Op. 2, No. 3, Callen 9 (published 1760)
Ludwig van Beethoven	Symphony No. 7, Op. 92 (1811–12)
Arthur Bird	Symphony, Op. 8 (1885?6?)
Luigi Boccherini	Symphony, Op. 21/6, G. 498 (1775); Symphony No. 6, Op. 12/6, G. 508 (1771); Symphony No. 9, Op. 35/3, G. 511 (1782); Symphony No. 16, Op. 37/4, G. 518 (1787)
Havergal Brian	Symphony No. 15 (1960)
Anton Bruckner	Symphony No. 6 (1879–81) (WAB 106)
Fritz Brun	Symphony No. 8 (1938)
Christian Cannabich	Symphony (after 1760)
Philip Greeley Clapp	Symphony No. 3
Leopold Damrosch	Symphony (1878)
Georg Druschetzky	Symphony in A major
František Xaver Dušek	Sinfonia, Altner A3
George Enescu	Symphony No. 2, Op. 17 (1912–14)
Pierre-Octave Ferroud	Symphony (1930)
Eduard Franck	Symphony ("Sinfonie") No. 1, Op. 47 (about 1850–1860, printed 1892)
Johann Gottlieb Graun	Sinfonia Graun WV Cv:XII:86
Christoph Graupner	Symphony, GWV 612
Joseph Haydn	Symphony No. 5 (by 1762); Symphony No. 14 (by 1764); Symphony No. 21 (1764); Symphony No. 28 (1765); Symphony No. 59, "Feuer" (by 1769); Symphony No. 64, "Tempora Mutantur" (by 1775); Symphony No. 65 (by 1778); Symphony No. 87 (1785)
Michael Haydn	Symphony No. 5, MH 63, Perger 3 (1763); Symphony No. 16, MH 152, Perger 6 (1771); Symphony No. 24, MH 302, Perger 15; Symphony No. 41, MH 508, Perger 33 (1789)
Johann Wilhelm Hertel	*two of his symphonies (not published during his lifetime) are in A major.
Leopold Hofmann	nine symphonies in this key (2 lost)
Ignaz Holzbauer	Symphony, Op. 2, No. 4 (published 1757)
Hans Huber	Symphony (unnumbered) (premiered December 1889); Symphony No. 4 "Academic" (in Form eines Concerto grosso für zwei Streichorchester, Klavier und Orgel) (1918); Symphony No. 6, Op. 134 (1911)
Vincent d'Indy	Symphony No. 1 Symphonie italienne (1870–72)
Salomon Jadassohn	Symphony No. 2, Op. 28 (1863?)
Paul Juon	Symphony No. 2, Op. 23 (1903)
Vasily Kalinnikov	Symphony No. 2 (1895–7)
Tikhon Khrennikov	Symphony No. 3, Op. 22 (1973)
Leopold Kozeluch	P I:7 Symphony Op. 24 No. 2; P I:10 Symphony "À La Française"
Joseph Martin Kraus	Symphony, VB128
Frederic Lamond	Symphony, Op. 3 (begun 1885, premiered 1890?)
Rued Langgaard	Symphony No.2 "Awakening of Spring" (1912–4, rev 1926)
Borys Lyatoshynsky	Symphony No. 1, Op. 2 (1917–19)
Leevi Madetoja	Symphony No. 3 (1925–6)
Jef Maes	Symphony No. 2 (1965)
Pierre van Maldere	Symphony VR35; Symphony VR41; Symphony VR45
Felix Mendelssohn	Symphony No. 4, Op. 90 "Italian" (1829–33)
Douglas Moore	Symphony No. 2 (1945)
Wolfgang Amadeus Mozart	Symphony No. 14, K. 114 (1771); Symphony No. 21, K. 134 (1772); Symphony No. 29, K. 201 (1774)
Nikolai Myaskovsky	Symphony No. 8, Op. 26 (1924–25)
Josef Mysliveček	Sinfonia E10:A1; Sinfonia E10:A3
George Onslow	Symphony No. 1 Op. 41 (1830)
Karl von Ordóñez	11 symphonies in this key
Otakar Ostrčil	Symphony (1906)
John Knowles Paine	Symphony No. 2 "Spring", Op. 34
Gavriil Popov	Symphony No. 5 "Pastoral", Op. 77 (1956)
John Powell	Symphony "Virginia" (1932–45, rev 1951)
Joachim Raff	Symphony No. 8 "Voices of Spring", Op. 205 (1876)
Carl Reinecke	Symphony No. 1, Op. 79 (1858)
Heinrich XXIV, Prince of Reuss-Köstritz	Symphony No. 2
Julius Röntgen	Symphony (No. 15) (1931)
Albert Roussel	Symphony No. 4, Op. 53 (1934)
Anton Rubinstein	Symphony No. 3, Op. 56 (finished in 1855)
Joseph Ryelandt	Symphony No. 5, Op. 108 (1933)
Camille Saint-Saëns	Symphony in A (1850)
Franz Schmidt	Symphony No. 3 (1927–28)
Bertram Shapleigh	Symphony No. 2, Op. 68
Dmitri Shostakovich	Symphony No. 15, Op. 141 (1971)
Johann Stamitz	Symphony "Mannheim" (probably written between 1741 and 1746)
Max Trapp	Symphony No. 7, Op. 55
Eduard Tubin	Symphony No. 4 (1943, revised 1978)
Johann Baptist Wanhal	Symphony Bryan A1; Symphony Bryan A2 (probably written before 1771); Symphony Bryan A3; Symphony Bryan A4; Symphony Bryan A5; Symphony Bryan A6; Symphony Bryan A7; Symphony Bryan A8; Symphony Bryan A9
Sergei Vasilenko	Symphony No. 3, Op. 81 (1934. for domra, balalaika orchestra and wind orchestra)
José Vianna da Motta	Symphony (1895)
Samuel Wesley	Symphony (lost) (c. 1781); Symphony (1784 or after)
Richard Wetz	Symphony No. 2, Op. 47 (1919)
Charles-Marie Widor	Symphony No. 2, Op. 54 (published 1882)
Franz Berwald	Symphony in A major (1820, only the first movement remains completed by English composer Duncan Druce)

== See also ==
For symphonies in other keys, see List of symphonies by key.
