= List of symphonies in F major =

This is a list of symphonies in F major written by notable composers.

Composer	Symphony
Carl Friedrich Abel	Symphony/Overture in F major, Op. 1 No. 5, D30/E5 (1759?); Symphony in F major, Op. 7 No. 4, E16 (1767)
Eugen d'Albert	Symphony, Op. 4 (1885)
Kurt Atterberg	Symphony No. 2, Op. 6 (1911–13)
Carl Philipp Emanuel Bach	Symphony in F major, Wq. 175 / H.650 (1755, rev. later); Symphony in F major, Wq. 181 / H.656 (1758, rev. 1762?); Symphony in F major, Wq. 183:3 / H.665 (1775)
Johann Christian Bach	Symphony, Op. 3 No. 5, W C5; Symphony, Op. 8 No. 4, W C15
Johann Christoph Friedrich Bach	Symphony in F major, BR-JCFB C 5 / Wf I: 1 (ca. 1768); Symphony in F major, BR-JCFB C 20 / Wf I/12 (ca. 1792, lost)
Arnold Bax	Symphony in F major (1907, piano score; 2012–13 orchestrated by Martin Yates)
Franz Ignaz Beck	Symphony, Op. 1 No. 2, Callen 2 (published 1758); Symphony, op. 3 no. 1, Callen 13 (published 1762); Symphony, Op. 4 No. 3, Callen 21 (published 1766)
Ludwig van Beethoven	Symphony No. 6 "Pastoral", Op. 68 (1808); Symphony No. 8, Op. 93 (1812)
Luigi Boccherini	Symphony, Op. 35 No. 4, G. 512 (1782)
Léon Boëllmann	Symphony, Op. 24
Johannes Brahms	Symphony No. 3, Op. 90 (1883)
Havergal Brian	Symphony No. 26 (1969)
Frederick Bridge	Symphony "Resurgam" (1897)
Fritz Brun	Symphony No. 9 "Symphony-Suite" (1949–50)
Christian Cannabich	Sinfonia, Op. 10 No. 4, Cannabich 49 (published 1772)
George Whitefield Chadwick	Symphony No. 3 (1894)
Frederic Hymen Cowen	Symphony No. 5 (1887)
William Crotch	Symphony in F (by 1814)
Ernst von Dohnányi	Symphony in F (1896)
Felix Draeseke	Symphony No. 2, Op. 25 (1871/75-6)
Antonín Dvořák	Symphony No. 5, Op. 76, B. 54 (1875)
Zdeněk Fibich	Symphony No. 1, Op. 17 (1877–83)
Niels Gade	Symphony No. 7, Op. 45 (1864)
Alexander Glazunov	Symphony No. 7, Op. 77 (1901-2)
Hermann Goetz	Symphony, Op. 9 (1873)
François Joseph Gossec	Symphony, Op. 12 No. 6 (1769)
Théodore Gouvy	Symphony No. 2, Op. 12
Adalbert Gyrowetz	Symphonies in F major (Note: At least four symphonies in F major:)(ca. 1791, republished in a collection of four Gyrowetz symphonies and on J.L. Dussek symphony); Symphony, Op. 6 No. 3 (Rice's F1, probably before 1791); Symphony, Op. 9 No. 3; Symphony, Op. 13 No. 2
Joseph Haydn	Symphony No. 17 (1765); Symphony No. 40 (1763); Symphony No. 58 (1774); Symphony No. 79 (1784); Symphony No. 89 (1787)
Michael Haydn	Symphony No. 1B, MH 25 (1758?); Symphony No. 22, MH 284, Perger 14, Sherman 23; Symphony No. 31, MH 405, Perger 22 (1785); Symphony No. 38, MH 477, Perger 30 (1788); Symphony No. 40, MH 507, Perger 32 (1789)
Leopold Hofmann	Symphony, Badley F1 (by 1767); Symphony, Badley F2 (ca. 1760)
Gustav Holst	Symphony "The Cotswolds", Op. 8 (1899-1900)
Hans Huber	Symphony No. 5
Jan Kalivoda	Symphony No. 6, Op. 132 (published 1845)
Sigfrid Karg-Elert	Sinfonia Brevis, Op. 1 (by 1897?)
Kosaku Yamada	Symphony "Triumph and Peace" (1912)
Leopold Kozeluch	Symphony op. 22 no. 2/P I:4; Symphony P I:F1
Joseph Martin Kraus	Sinfonia Buffa, VB 129; Symphony, VB 130; Symphony, VB 145
Franz Krommer	Symphony No. 1, Op. 12 (published about 1798)
Joseph Küffner	Symphony No. 3, Op. 83
Franz Lachner	Symphony No. 2, Op. 44 (by 1839)
Rued Langgaard	Symphony No. 5 "Nature of the Steppe" (Two versions are available); Symphony No. 7 "By Tordenskjold in Holmen Church" (Two versions are available); Symphony No. 8 "Memories at Amalienborg" (1926–45); Symphony No. 9 "From Queen Dagmar's City" (1942)
George Lloyd	Symphony No. 3 (1933)
Giuseppe Martucci	Symphony No. 2, Op. 81 (1904)
William J. McCoy	Symphony (by 1872)
Erkki Melartin	Symphony No. 3, Op. 40 (1906–07)
Wolfgang Amadeus Mozart	Symphony No. 6, K. 43; Symphony No. 18, K. 130 (1772)
Nikolai Myaskovsky	Symphony No. 16, Op. 39, "Aviation" (1935–36)
Zygmunt Noskowski	Symphony No. 3 "From Spring to Spring" (1903)
Hubert Parry	Symphony No. 2 "Cambridge" (1882–87?)
Ignaz Pleyel	Symphony no. 10 in F; Symphonie Périodique No. 6, Op. 27
Cipriani Potter	Symphony No. 7 (1826)
Ebenezer Prout	Symphony No. 3, Op. 22 (by 1885?)
Joachim Raff	Symphony No. 3 "Im Walde", Op. 153 (1869)
Anton Reicha	Symphony No. 3 (completed c. 1808) (see List of compositions by Anton Reicha)
Josef Rheinberger	Symphony No. 2 "Florentine", Op. 87 (1875)
Ferdinand Ries	Symphony No. 4, Op. 110 (1818)
Jean Rivier	Symphony No. 7 "Les Contrastes" (1960)
Anton Rubinstein	Symphony No. 1, Op. 40 (1850)
Camille Saint-Saëns	Symphony "Urbs Roma" (1856)
Christian Sinding	Symphony No. 3, Op. 121 (1919)
Louis Spohr	Symphony No. 4 "Die Weihe der Töne", Op. 86 (1832)
Carl Stamitz	Symphony, Op. 24 No. 3
Johann Stamitz	Symphony, Op. 4 No. 1 (Wolf F3)
Charles Villiers Stanford	Symphony No. 4, Op. 31 (by 1889)
Wilhelm Stenhammar	Symphony No. 1 (1902–03, disowned))
Max Trapp	Symphony No. 5, Op. 33 (premiered 1937)
Felix Weingartner	Symphony No. 4, Op. 61 (1916–17)
Richard Wüerst	Preis-Symphonie, Op. 21 (by 1850?)
