= Symphony in G =

Symphony in G can refer to:

- List of symphonies in G minor
- List of symphonies in G major

== See also ==
- List of symphonies by key
