= Symphony No. 34 (Michael Haydn) =

Symphony in three movements by Joseph Haydn

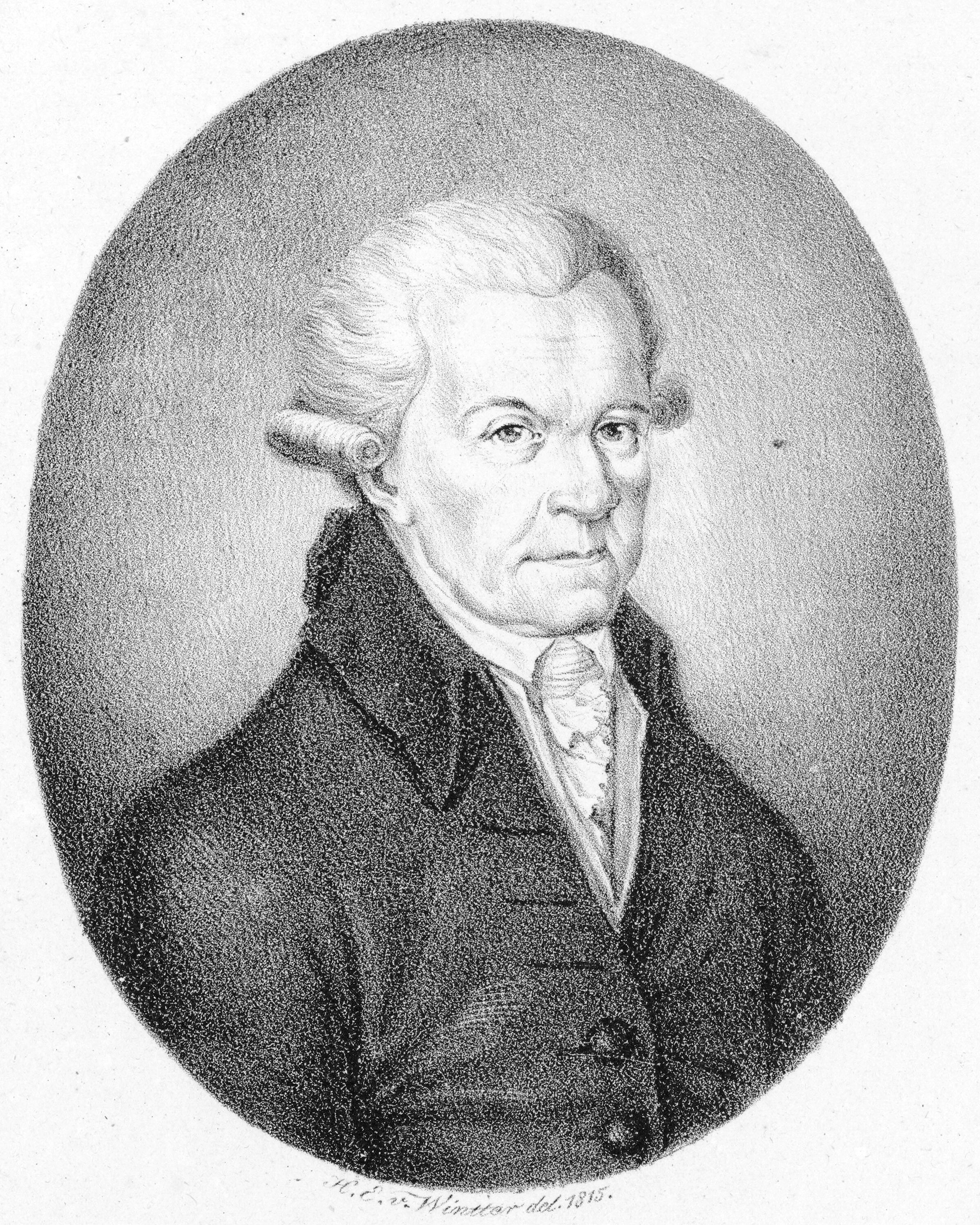
Portrait of composer Michael Haydn

Michael Haydn's Symphony No. 34 in E♭ major, Perger 26, Sherman 34, MH 473, written in Salzburg in 1788, is the last E♭ major symphony he wrote, the first of his final set of six symphonies. Scored for two oboes, two bassoons, two horns, and strings, the symphony is in three movements:

1. Allegro con brio
2. Adagietto, in B♭ major
3. Fugato. Allegro

The first and last movements begin the same way, only that the first movement uses the theme to launch a sonata form while the third movement uses it to preface a fugato.

== Discography ==
Like the other symphonies of the 1788 set of six, this one is in the CPO disc with Johannes Goritzki conducting the New German Chamber Academy. It is also available on a Chandos disc of the London Mozart Players conducted by Matthias Bamert, which also includes Symphonies Nos. 11, 16 and 25.
