= Symphony No. 36 (Michael Haydn) =

Portrait of Michael Haydn by Franz Xaver Hornöck

Michael Haydn's Symphony No. 36 in B♭ major, Perger 28, Sherman 36, MH 475, written in Salzburg in 1788, is the last B♭ major symphony he wrote, the third of his final set of six symphonies.

== Music ==
Scored for two oboes, two bassoons, two horns, two trumpets, timpani, and strings. It is perhaps the first symphony in B♭ major to use trumpets and drums, something which is thought to have been pioneered by Joseph Haydn (see Symphony No. 98).

This symphony is in three movements:

1. Allegro con fuoco
2. Andante con espressione, in F major
3. Rondo. Presto molto

=== I. Allegro con fuoco ===
The first movement, in sonata form, has for its first theme one of Haydn's most triadic themes, with the first violins not playing a note outside of the tonic chord until bar 13.

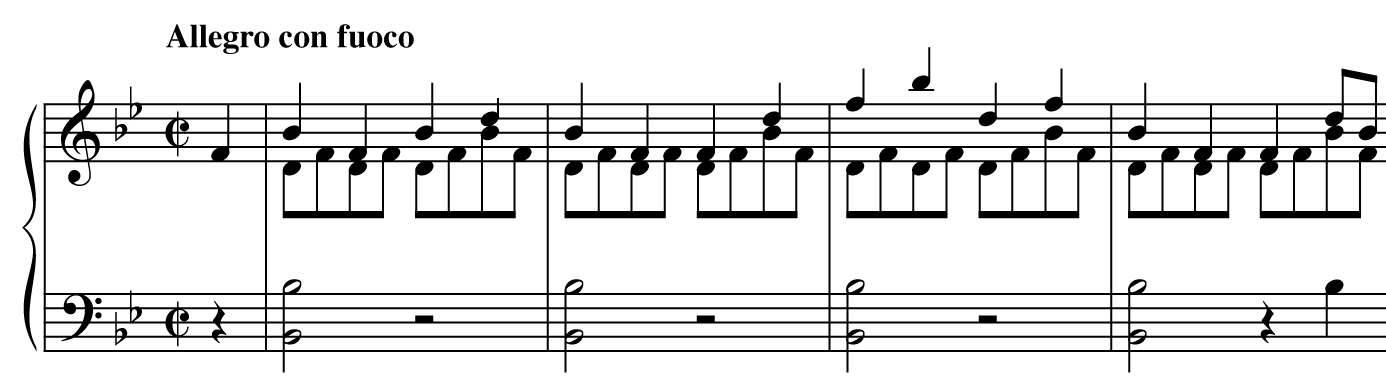

The second theme (starting at bar 40) is by contrast extremely scalar, moving primarily in seconds. The development uses a new theme to lead back to the recapitulation.

=== II. Andante con espressione ===
Unlike Haydn's other slow movements in symphonies with trumpets and timpani, the timpani are not silent in this one (see Joseph Haydn's Symphony No. 88). Bassoons and oboes take turns doubling the first violins on the melody.

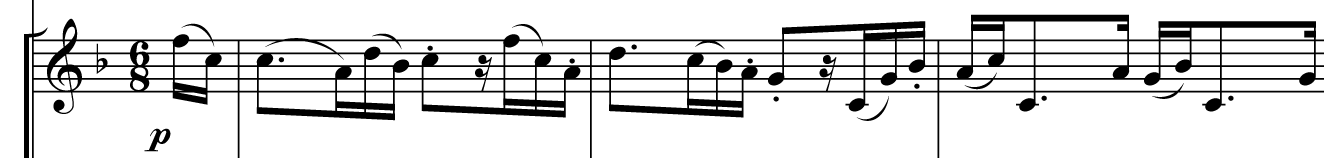

The melody is for the most part entrusted to the first violins, but the first bassoon often doubles it an octave below (while the second bassoon sticks to the usual duty of doubling the cello line in unison).

=== III. Rondo. Presto molto ===
The third movement, a rondo, features dramatic contrasts of piano and forte in its main theme.

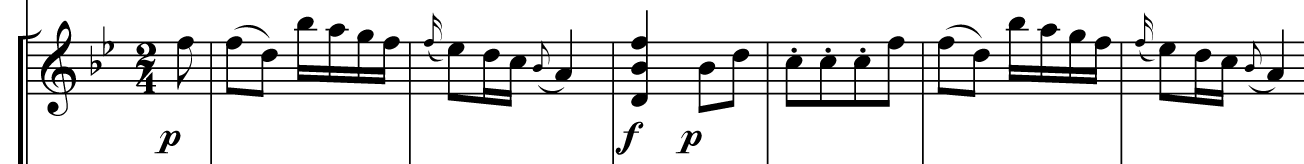

== Discography ==
Like the other symphonies of the 1788 set of six, this one is in the CPO disc with Johannes Goritzki conducting the New German Chamber Academy.
