= Serenade in D major, P. 87 =

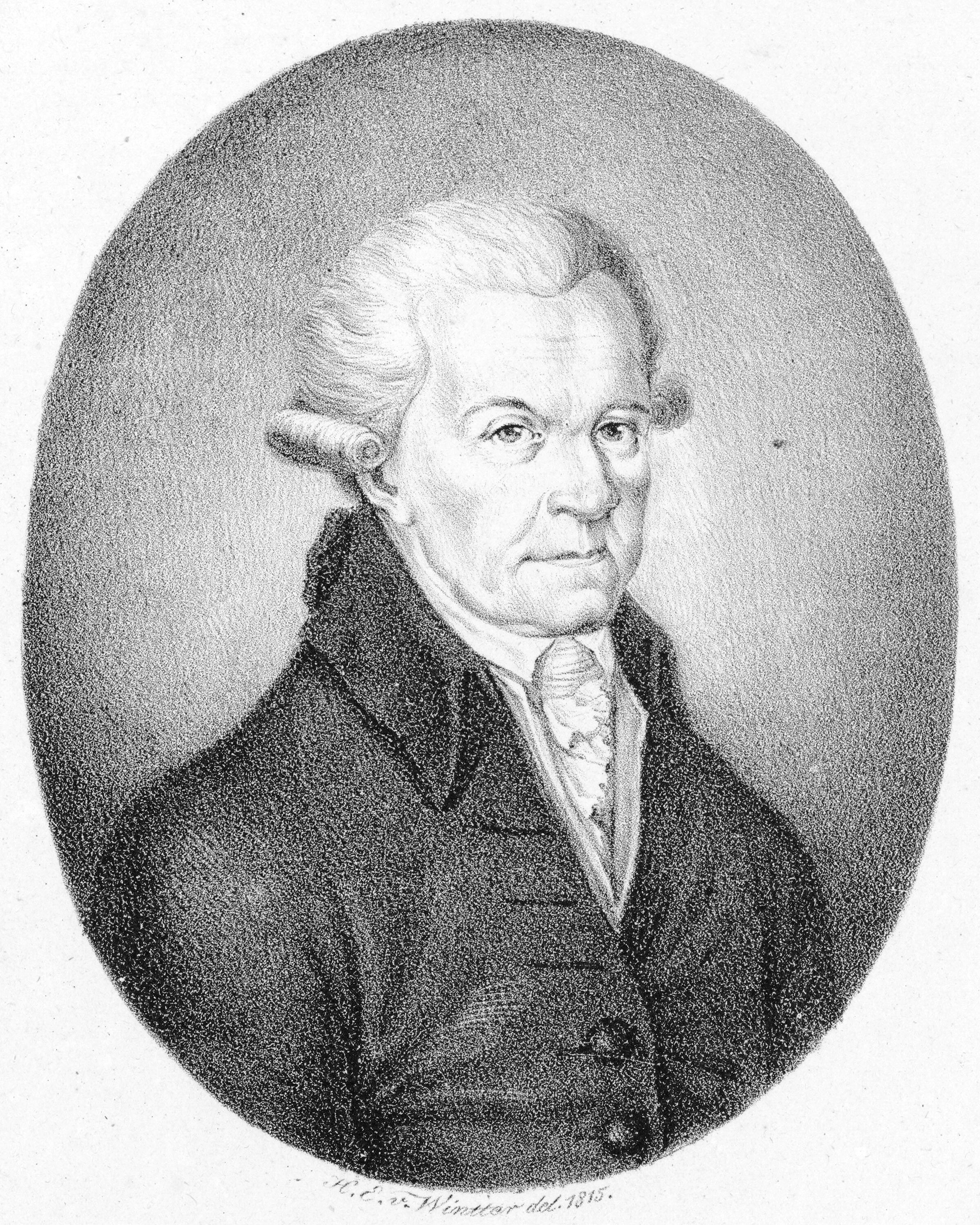
Portrait of composer Michael Haydn

Michael Haydn's Serenade in D major, Perger 87, MH 86 was written in Salzburg in 1767.

== Music ==
The serenade is scored for flute, oboe, bassoon, horn, clarino, trombone, violin I, violin II, viola, violoncello, and basso continuo.

The serenade has ten movements:

1. Allegro assai
2. Andante
3. Menuetto I
4. Concertino per il Corno e Trombone: Adagio
5. Allegro Molto
6. Menuetto II
7. Recitativo: Allegro – Adagio – Allegro
8. Finale: Presto
9. Recitativo: Adagio
10. Marcia: Andante

The second movement begins with eight measures of introduction by the entire ensemble. A simple and calm style of chamber music writing by Michael Haydn, similar to Joseph Haydn's writing yet perhaps more angelic. After mere sixteen beats of such sounds of innocence, solo cello begins the melody, like a child's play, nothing complicated, nothing fancy or deep with even simpler accompaniment of pizzicato by a string quartet. Just when one's mind starts to wonder out of boredom, solo flute sweetly steals the spot light by singing a delightful melody with the solo cello answering back as a secondary melody. A gentle pizzicato accompaniment pulsing through the lovers' murmuring between solo cello and solo flute. Not surprising that second half begins with the two lovers singing the same tune, results into even a little sorrow, but such dissatisfaction is short lived. Such tenderness and delight take flight dissolves into the night.

The first menuet in Haydn's piece is fairly straightforward. There are two main sections to this movement, the Menuet and the Trio. As is typical, both sections consist of two smaller ideas that are repeated. The Menuet is in 3/4, giving us a very strong feel of dance. The Trio section has three distinct ideas, thus the terminology 'Trio.' Haydn took flute and cello soloists from the orchestra, each with distinct parts, and accompanied them with the remaining strings. This gave us three separate ideas while still utilizing most of his ensemble. After the Trio concludes, we have a da capo that takes us back to the Menuet, this time played without the repeats. Giving us a standard A–B–A form. Harmonically this movement does not do much out of the ordinary. He starts the Menuet in A major (I) and at the second section transitions us to E major (V). He ends the Menuet section on a I chord and then we have, what is possibly the most harmonically exciting part of the movement, the Trio. Initially the Trio begins on a major VI chord (F#) which is a bit jarring after A major. However, he quickly sequences through the circle of fifths, VI–ii–V–I, to lead us back to A major. Again, he throws us through a loop by not lingering on tonic, but instead going immediately to a V/V (B7) and then resolving to V (E major). He sticks to E major through most of the Trio section, again giving us a miniature tour de keys at the second section of the Trio, but landing solidly on the V yet again, to send us back to A major by the last bar of the Trio and into the repeated Menuet.
