= Symphony No. 40 (Michael Haydn) =

Michael Haydn's Symphony No. 40 in F major, Perger 32, Sherman 40, MH 507, written in Salzburg in 1789, was the last symphony in F major that he wrote. The symphony is scored for two oboes, two bassoons, two horns, and strings. It is in three movements:

1. Allegro molto
2. Adagio mà non troppo
3. Rondeau, Vivace

The London Mozart Players conducted by Matthias Bamert recorded this symphony on the Chandos label along with Symphonies No.s 11, 16, 25 and 34.
