= Isabelle van Keulen =

Dutch violinist (born 1966)

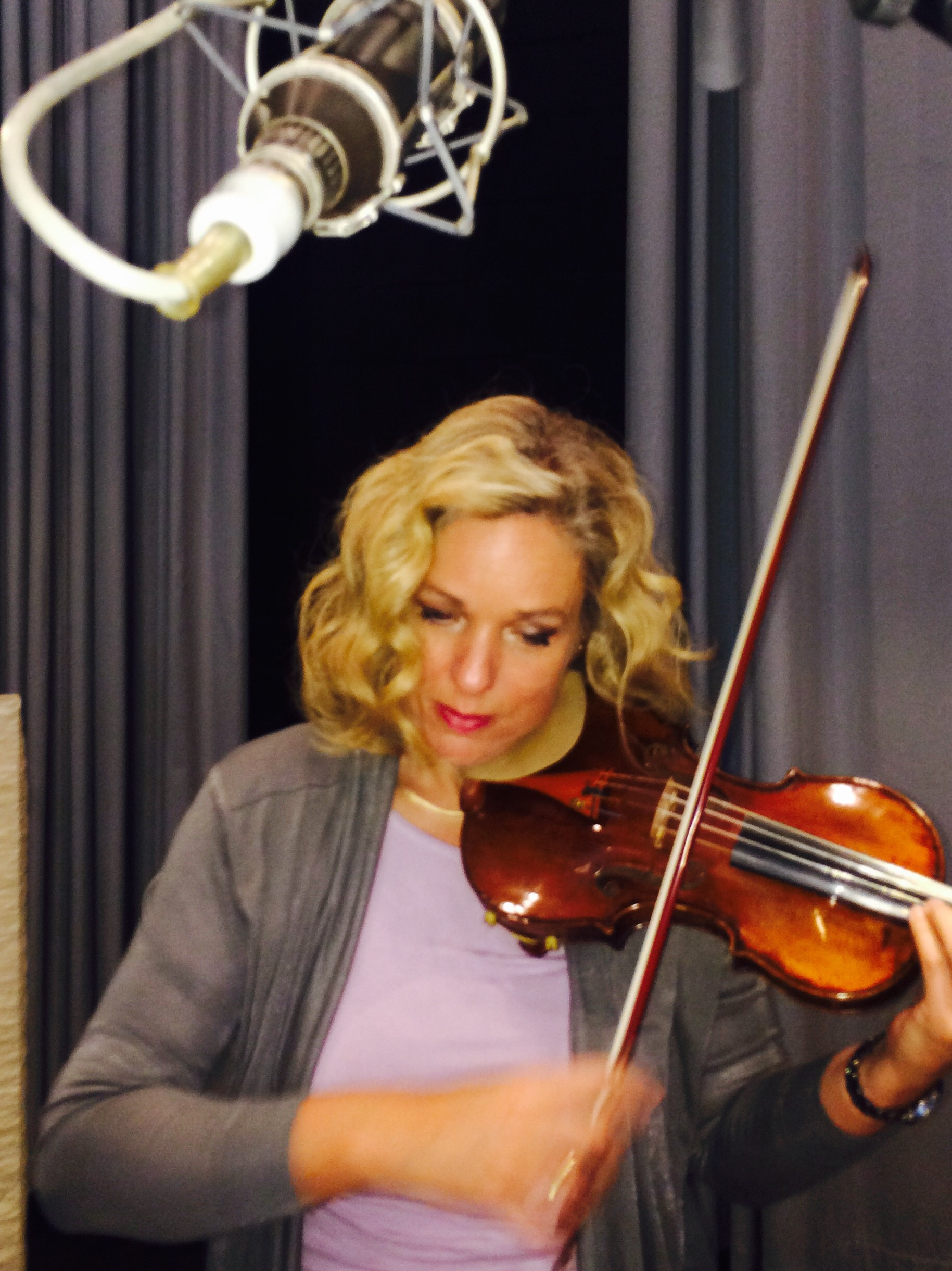
- Born: 16 December 1966 (age 59); Mijdrecht, Netherlands
- Occupations: Classical violinist; Academic teacher
- Organizations: Isos Quartet; Lucerne School of Music; Deutsche Kammerakademie Neuss
- Website: www.isabellevankeulen.com

Isabelle van Keulen (born 16 December 1966) is a Dutch violinist and violist, performing principally as a chamber musician but also as a concert violist. She founded the Isos Quartet in 1995. For more than 20 years, she collaborated with the pianist Ronald Brautigam and the mezzo-soprano singer Christianne Stotijn. In 2012, she became an educator at the Lucerne School of Music. Since 2017, she has been artistic director at Deutsche Kammerakademie Neuss in Germany.

== Early life ==
Born in Mijdrecht on 16 December 1966, Isabelle van Keulen was raised in an art-loving home in which her father was a painter and her sister a flautist. She began studying the violin when she was only six under Theo de Bakker. From 1979, she continued her studies at Alkwin College in Uithoorn and from 1984 at the Amsterdam Conservatoire under Davina van Wely.

== Career ==
In 1983, she won second prize in the Menuhin Young Violinists Competition and the following year was the winner of the Eurovision Young Musicians contest which was televised throughout Europe.

In the early 1990s, she performed frequently as a concert violist, in 1995 she founded the Isos Quartet as first violinist, and in 1996 she founded the Delft International Music Festival which she directed until 2006. Van Keulen has taken a special interest in performing the works of less recognized modern composers, including Alfred Schnittke, Sofia Gubaidulina, Witold Lutosławski, Allan Pettersson, Hans Henkemans, Erkki-Sven Tüür and Theo Loevendie.

Since 1992, her performances have been released on a wide selection of CDs.
