= Symphony No. 10 (Michael Haydn) =

Michael Haydn's Symphony No. 10 in F major, Perger 45, Sherman 8, Sherman-adjusted 10, MH 69, is believed to have been written in Salzburg after 1774. The symphony is scored for flute, two oboes, two bassoons, horns, two trumpets, timpani, and strings. It is in four movements:

1. Allegro molto
2. Andante, in G major
3. Minuet and Trio (the latter in D minor)
4. Presto

== Discography ==
It is included in a set of 20 symphonies on the CPO label with Bohdan Warchal conducting the Slovak Philharmonic.
