= Symphony No. 39 (Mozart) =

1788 composition by W. A. Mozart

- by W. A. Mozart
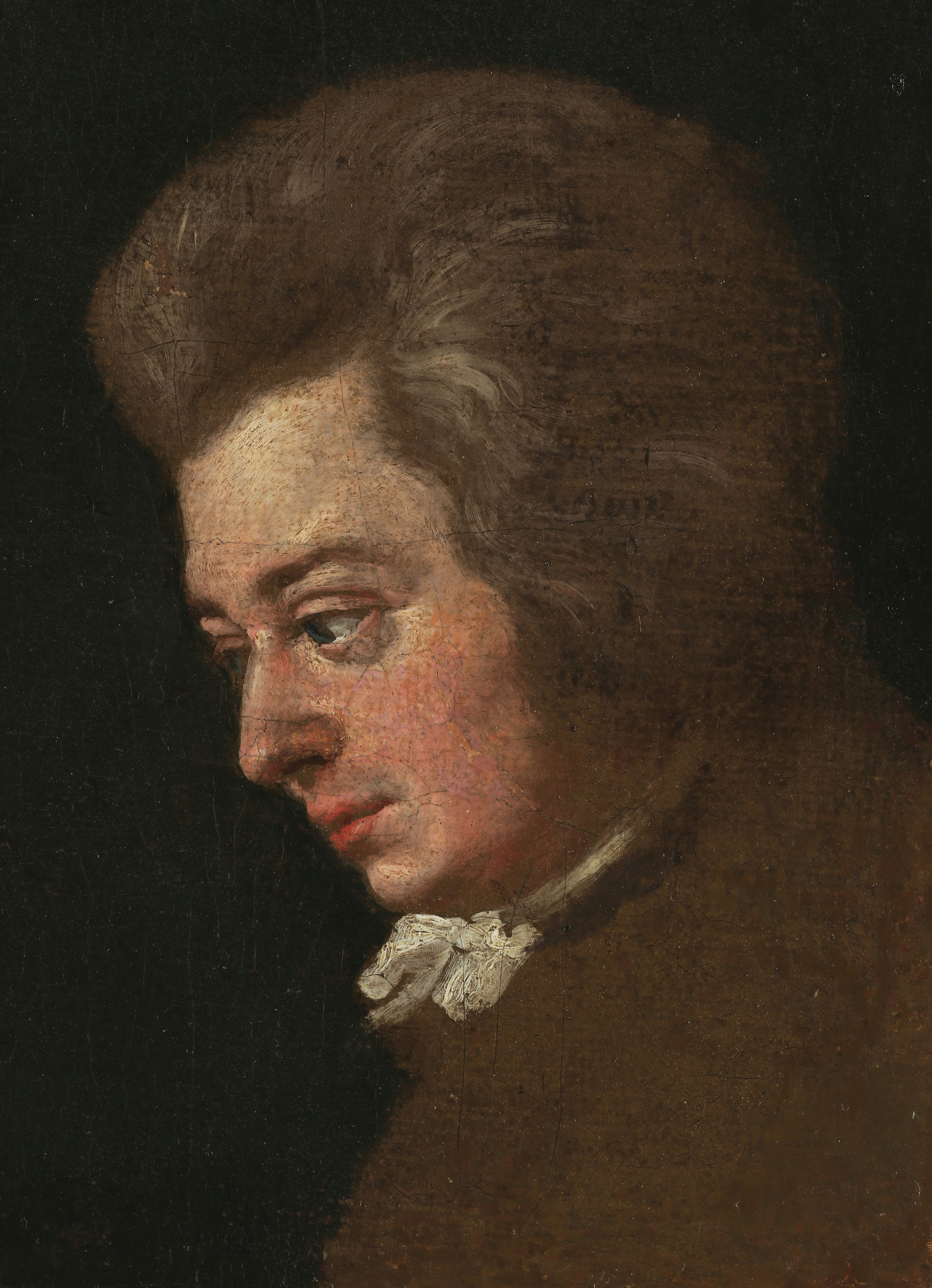
- Mozart c. 1783
- Key: E♭ major
- Catalogue: K. 543
- Composed: 1788
- Duration: c. 25 minutes
- Movements: 4
- Scoring: Orchestra

The Symphony No. 39 in E♭ major of Wolfgang Amadeus Mozart, K. 543, was completed on 26 June 1788.

== Composition ==
This symphony is the first of a set of three (his last symphonies) that Mozart composed in rapid succession during the summer of 1788. No. 40 was completed on 25 July and No. 41 on 10 August. Nikolaus Harnoncourt argues that Mozart composed the three symphonies as a unified work, pointing, among other things, to the fact that the Symphony No. 39 has a grand introduction (in the manner of an overture) but no coda.

Around the time that he composed the three symphonies, Mozart was writing his piano trios in E major and C major (K. 542 and K. 548), his sonata facile (K. 545), and his violin sonata no. 36 in F major (K. 547). Mozart biographer Alfred Einstein has suggested that Mozart modeled his symphony on Michael Haydn's Symphony No. 26, of which he had acquired a copy in 1784. However, Neal Zaslaw points out that if it was indeed an influence, Mozart "so far surpassed his 'model' as to make comparisons virtually meaningless".

The autograph score, contained in a volume containing nine Mozart symphonies in autograph, was sold by a private buyer to an unknown collector during an auction at Sotheby's in London in 1987 for £2.5m ($4.7m) – a record price for a non-medieval manuscript at the time.

== Premiere ==
It seems to be impossible to determine the date of the premiere of the 39th Symphony on the basis of currently available evidence; in fact, it cannot be established whether the symphony was ever performed in the composer's lifetime. According to Deutsch (1965), around the time Mozart wrote the work, he was preparing to hold a series of "Concerts in the Casino", in a new casino in the Spiegelgasse owned by Philipp Otto. Mozart even sent a pair of tickets for this series to his friend Michael von Puchberg. But it seems impossible to determine whether the concert series was held or was cancelled for lack of interest. In addition, in the period up to the end of his life, Mozart participated in various other concerts the programs of which included an unidentified symphony; these also could have been the occasion of the premiere of the 39th (for details, see Symphony No. 40 (Mozart)).

=== First eyewitness account ===
The earliest known eyewitness account of a performance of the symphony is that of a certain Iwan Anderwitsch, who attended an all-Mozart memorial concert in Hamburg in March 1792. Describing the start of the symphony, he wrote:

The opening is so majestic that it so surprised even the coldest, most insensitive listener and non-expert, that even if he wanted to chat, it prevented him from being inattentive, and thus, so to speak, put him in a position to become all ears. It then becomes [so] fiery, full, ineffably grand and rich in ideas, with striking variety in almost all obbligato parts, that it is nearly impossible to follow so rapidly with ear and feeling, and one is nearly paralyzed. This actual paralysis became visible in various connoisseurs and friends of music, and some admitted that they would never have been able to think or imagine they would hear something like this performed so splendidly in Hamburg.

In modern times, the work is part of the core symphonic repertoire and is frequently performed and recorded.

== Instrumentation and movements ==
The symphony is scored for flute, two clarinets, two bassoons, two horns, two trumpets, timpani and strings.

External audio
- Performance by the Philharmonia Orchestra, Otto Klemperer conducting (1960) – via Internet Archive

There are four movements:

1. Adagio, (Alla breve) (Note: Older scores show the introduction in 4/4.) – Allegro, 3/4 (in sonata form)
2. Andante con moto in A♭ major, 2/4 (in modified sonata form without development)
3. Menuetto: Allegretto – Trio, 3/4 (in compound ternary form)
4. Finale: Allegro, 2/4 (in sonata form)

=== I. Adagio – Allegro ===
The first movement opens with a majestic introduction with fanfares heard in the brass section. This is followed by an Allegro in sonata form, though while several features – the loud outburst following the soft opening, for instance – connect it with the galant school that influences the earliest of his symphonies. The independence of the winds and greater interplay of the parts in general, and the fact that the second theme group contains several themes (including a particularly felicitous "walking theme") compared to those earlier symphonies whose second groups were practically always completely trivial, are just a very few of the points that distinguish this movement from those earlier works, from which it has more differences than similarities.

=== II. Andante con moto ===
The slow movement, in abridged sonata form, i.e. no development section, starts quietly in the strings and expands into the rest of the orchestra. Quiet main material and energetic, somewhat agitated transitions characterize this movement. The key is A♭ major, the subdominant of E♭ major.

=== III. Menuetto: Allegretto ===
The work has a very interesting minuet and trio. The trio is an Austrian folk dance called a "Ländler" and features a clarinet solo. The forceful Menuetto is set off by the trio's unusual tint of the second clarinet playing arpeggios in its low (chalumeau) register. The melody for this particular folk dance derived from local drinking songs which were popular in Vienna during the late 18th century.

=== IV. Finale: Allegro ===
The finale is another sonata form whose main theme, like that of the later string quintet in D, is mostly a scale, here ascending and descending. The development section is dramatic; there is no coda, but both the exposition, and the development through the end of the recapitulation, are repeated.
