= Symphony No. 26 (Michael Haydn) =

Michael Haydn's Symphony No. 26 in E♭ major, Perger 17, Sherman 26, MH 340, written in Salzburg in 1783, was the first of the only three symphonies published in his lifetime. It was one of several E♭-major symphonies attributed to Joseph Haydn (Hob. I:Es17).

The symphony is scored for two oboes, two bassoons, two horns, and strings. It is in three movements:

1. Allegro spiritoso
2. Adagietto affettuoso (in A♭ major)
3. Presto

The first of these movements is now acknowledged by scholars to have been an important influence on Mozart's Symphony No. 39 in the same key.

== Discography ==
This symphony is included on disc 6 of a set of 20 symphonies on the CPO label with Bohdan Warchal conducting the Slovak Philharmonic. It has also been recorded by Capella Savaria conducted by Pál Németh on the Hungaroton label, and by Florian Heyerick with the Academia Palatina on the label Etcetera.
