= Symphony No. 7 (Michael Haydn) =

Michael Haydn's Symphony No. 7 in E major, Perger 5, Sherman 7, MH 65, written in Salzburg in 1764, is one of the few symphonies in E major written in the 18th century and was the first of four symphonies in the key to be mistaken for a symphony by Joseph Haydn (Hob. I:E1).

The work is scored for two oboes (the first of these switching to flute for the slow movement), two bassoons, two horns, and strings. It is in three movements:

1. Allegro
2. Andantino in A major
3. Allegro

== Discography ==
Included in a set of 20 symphonies on the CPO label with Bohdan Warchal conducting the Slovak Philharmonic.
