= Jpc (retailer) =

jpc-schallplatten Versandhandelsgesellschaft mbH
- Industry: Internet Retail
- Founded: 1973
- Headquarters: Georgsmarienhütte, Germany
- Key people: Georg Gerhard Ortmann
- Website: www.jpc.de

jpc is a German music-retailer based in Georgsmarienhütte near Osnabrück. The name stands for jazz-pop-classic.

The business was started in 1970 by two university students selling LPs from a wallpapering table to finance their studies. In 1973, came a physical shop, and in 1976 mail order. The growth story of the mail-order business is a case study in German retailing textbooks. The company now employs 200 people and describes itself as the biggest retailer of classical music in Europe. jpc also owns its own classical label, cpo, which specialises in lesser known works by German composers and won "Best Label" at the Cannes Classical Awards in 1996. The company now also retails books and DVDs.
