= Symphony No. 2 (Michael Haydn) =

Portrait of Michael Haydn by Franz Xaver Hornöck

Michael Haydn's Symphony No. 2 in C major, Perger 2, Sherman 2, MH 37, was written in Oradea in 1761. The symphony is scored for two oboes, two bassoons, two horns, two trumpets, strings, and continuo. It has four movements:

1. Allegro
2. Andante, in F major
3. Menuetto e Trio
4. Presto

The first movement begins almost like a concerto grosso, but is in fact in a proto-sonata form (with the very brief development carried almost entirely by the violins without accompaniment). The exposition has a repeat, and the development and recapitulation are also marked off by a repeat (which is not always observed).

The slow movement is written for strings only, but the continuo is generally understood to continue through; the violas rather than the second violins double the first violins at the octave (Delarte, 2006).

The minuet has no pick-up, the horns and trumpets come to the foreground in the trio. For the most part, the winds support the strings harmonically.

The last movement is a lively rondo with a stronger tendency to F major than G major.

== Discography ==
This work is included in a set of 20 symphonies on the CPO label with Bohdan Warchal conducting the Slovak Philharmonic, on disc 1. The recording has a figured bass realization, and both repeats in the first movement are taken. In Pál Németh's Hungaroton CD with the Savaria Baroque Orchestra the figured bass is also realized but the first movement repeats are ignored.
