= Symphony No. 9 (Michael Haydn) =

Symphony by Michael Haydn

Michael Haydn's Symphony No. 9 in D major, Perger 36, Sherman 9, MH 50, was written in Salzburg in 1766. It is the 21st D major symphony attributed to Joseph Haydn in Hoboken's catalog. It is scored for two oboes, two bassoons, two horns, and strings. The symphony is in four movements:

1. Allegro assai
2. Andante in D minor
3. Minuet and Trio
4. Presto assai

Note however that Sherman and other scholars believe the Minuet and Trio may have been composed by someone else.

== Discography ==
Included in a set of 20 symphonies on the CPO label with Bohdan Warchal conducting the Slovak Philharmonic. This recording excludes the Minuet.
