= Symphony No. 35 (Michael Haydn) =

Michael Haydn's Symphony No. 35 in G major, Perger 27, Sherman 35, MH 474, written in Salzburg in 1788, is the last G major symphony he wrote, the second of his final set of six symphonies. Scored for two oboes, two bassoons, two horns, and strings, it is a symphony in three movements:

1. Allegro spiritoso
2. Andante, in D major with an episode in D minor
3. Presto

== Discography ==
Like the other symphonies of the 1788 set of six, this one is in the CPO disc with Johannes Goritzki conducting the New German Chamber Academy.
