= Symphony No. 25 (Michael Haydn) =

Symphony in three movements by Michael Haydn

- by Michael Haydn
- Michael Haydn
- Key: G major
- Catalogue: MH 334
- Composed: 23 May 1783
- Duration: c. 15 minutes
- Movements: 3
- Scoring: Orchestra

The Symphony No. 25 in G major, Perger 16, Sherman 25, MH 334 is a classical symphony that was composed by Michael Haydn in 1783, with a completion date of 23 May. It is scored for flute (in the second movement), two oboes, two bassoons, two horns, and strings.

The opus was for a long time believed to be Mozart's Symphony No. 37 in G major, K. 444, but it is now known that Mozart only added an Adagio maestoso introduction to Michael Haydn's symphony, "an expressive prelude, which, moreover, is by no means entirely in key with the movement it is intended to prepare." The true authorship was discovered by Lothar Perger in 1907.

The work is in three movements:

1. Allegro con spirito
2. Andante sostenuto
3. Finale: Allegro molto

== Discography ==
Whether or not a recording includes Mozart's introduction may depend in part on whether the disc is part of a collection of Mozart or Haydn symphonies.

Bohdan Warchal's box set of Haydn symphonies on the CPO label only includes what Haydn wrote, and the same is true of Matthias Bamert's recording with the London Mozart Players and Patrick Gallois' with the Czech Chamber Philharmonic Orchestra Pardubice; all three put this symphony together with other Haydn symphonies. However, Christopher Hogwood's recording of Mozart's complete symphonies on the Éditions de l'Oiseau-Lyre, (included in the appendix as Mozart's Symphony No. 37, K. 444) contains the slow introduction. The Lausanne Chamber Orchestra, conducted by Christian Zacharias, however, includes, besides this one and Symphony No. 11, his Requiem for the death of Count Archbishop Sigismund von Schrattenbach. Nicholas Ward conducted the Northern Chamber Orchestra in another interpretation of the symphony with the introduction added by Mozart.

== Sources ==
- Perger, Lothar: Thematisches Verzeichnis der Instrumentalwerke von Michael Haydn. Vienna: Artaria 1907
- Charles H. Sherman and T. Donley Thomas, Johann Michael Haydn (1737-1806), a chronological thematic catalogue of his works. Stuyvesant, New York: Pendragon Press (1993)
