= Symphony No. 19 (Michael Haydn) =

Symphony

Michael Haydn's Symphony No. 19 in D major, Perger 11, Sherman 19, MH 198, was written in Salzburg in 1774. The symphony is scored for flute, two oboes, two bassoons, two horns (featured prominently in the Andante second movement), and strings. It has four movements:

1. Allegro
2. Andante, in D minor
3. Minuet and Trio (the latter in D minor)
4. Presto assai

Of the symphonies with Minuets, this is one of the few to have a minor key trio (another is Symphony No. 5).
