= Symphony No. 38 (Michael Haydn) =

Michael Haydn's Symphony No. 38 in F major, Perger 30, Sherman 38, MH 477, written in Salzburg in 1788, is the next to last F major symphony he wrote, the fifth of his final set of six symphonies.

The symphony is scored for two oboes, two bassoons, two horns, and strings. Sherman's edition of the score has "Cembalo" written in square brackets, suggesting continuo is optional in this work, despite his often-repeated statement that Haydn considered continuo essential even in the most fully instrumented works.

This work is in three movements:

1. Allegro molto
2. Andantino, in C major
3. Scherzando

Unlike the other symphonies in the final set of six, this one starts out piano and then states its theme forte, whereas the others first state it forte and then piano (though this is not unique among Haydn's symphonies). Despite its using horns in F, which became standard, the parts are still fairly limited to few notes in addition to F and C. However, in the recapitulation of the first movement, the first horn doubles the first violins an octave lower on the first theme. In the slow movement, the celli, instead of doubling the bassoons and basses on the bass line, double the first violins an octave lower and are written in tenor clef (changing to bass clef for a few measures in which they rejoin the bass complex).

Completed on February 10, the autograph score was bequeathed by Prince Esterházy to Hungary's national library in Budapest. Charles Sherman based his edition for Ludwig Doblinger "on a set of performance parts, bearing corrections in the composer's hand," from "the music collection of the Benedictine Archabbey of St. Peter in Salzburg."

== Discography ==
Like the other symphonies of the 1788 set of six, this one is in the CPO disc with Johannes Goritzki conducting the New German Chamber Academy.
