= Symphony No. 12 (Michael Haydn) =

Michael Haydn's Symphony No. 12 in G major, Perger 7, Sherman 12, MH 108, written in Salzburg in 1768, was at one time mistaken for a symphony by Joseph Haydn (Hob. I:G8). The symphony is scored for two oboes, two bassoons, two horns, and strings. It is in four movements:

1. Allegro molto
2. Andante, in C major
3. Menuetto e Trio
4. Prestissimo

== Discography ==
Included in a set of 20 symphonies on the CPO label with Bohdan Warchal conducting the Slovak Philharmonic. It has also appeared on LP, recorded by the Camerata Academica Salzburg, and by the RIAS-Sinfonietta Berlin.
