= Symphony No. 1 (Michael Haydn) =

Michael Haydn's Symphony No. 1 in C major, Perger 35, Sherman 1, MH 23, is believed to have been written in Vienna around 1759. It is not clear whether this is the first symphony Michael Haydn wrote. The symphony is scored for two oboes, two bassoons, two horns, two trumpets, timpani and strings. It is in four movements:

1. Allegro
2. Andante, in G major
3. Menuetto e Trio, both in F major
4. Presto
