= Symphony No. 37 (Michael Haydn) =

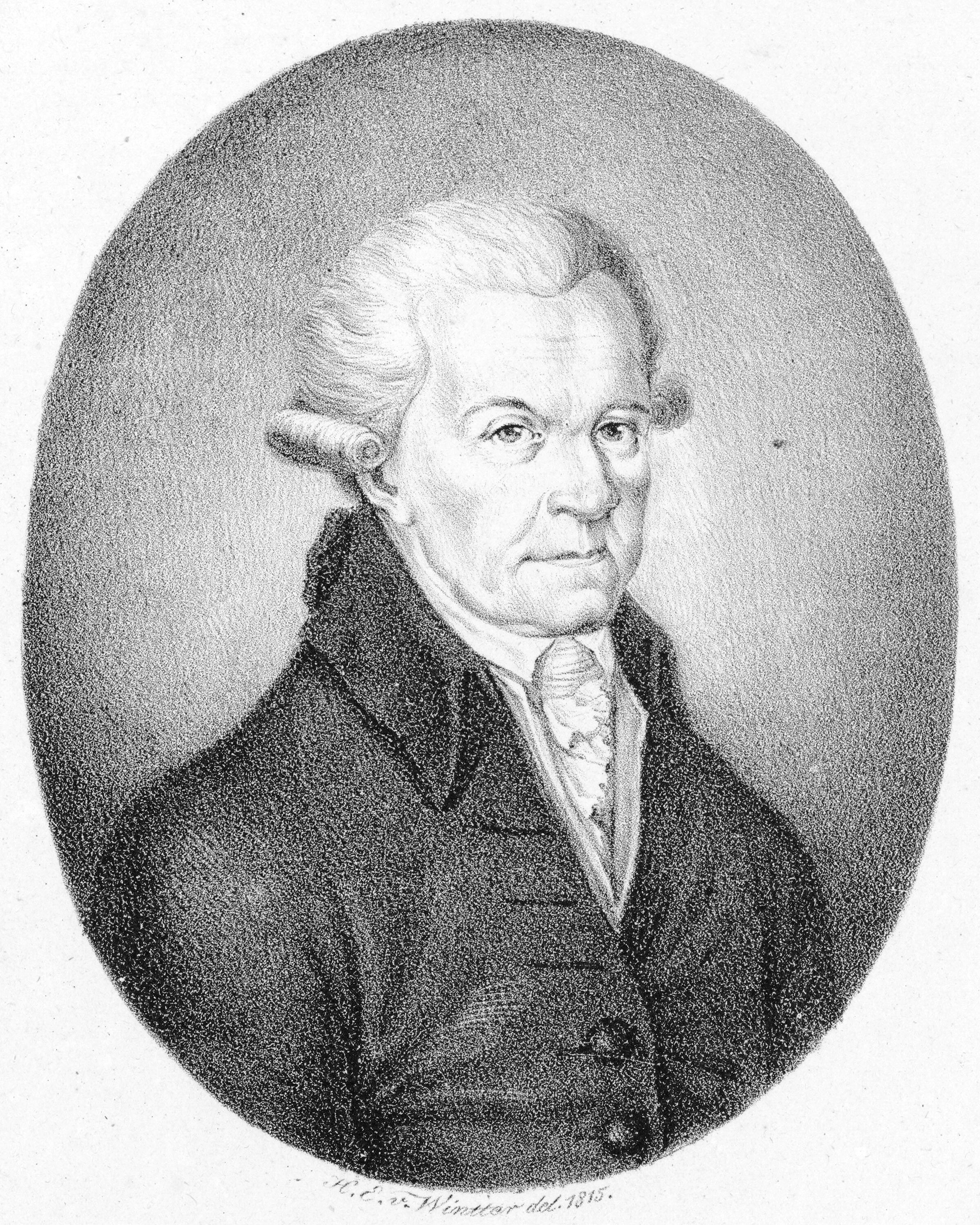
Portrait of composer Michael Haydn

Michael Haydn's Symphony No. 37 in D major, Perger 29, Sherman 37, MH 476, written in Salzburg in 1788, is the last D major symphony he wrote, the fourth of his final set of six symphonies. The symphony is scored for two oboes (2nd alternating on flute in the second movement), two bassoons, two horns, and strings. The symphony is in three movements:

1. Vivace
2. Andantino, in A major
3. Allegro assai

The first movement is notable among Haydn's works for the use of tremolo notation as a shortcut for repeated semiquavers. The second movement, like the slow movements of other symphonies in the set, treats the woodwinds in an almost concertante fashion. The third movement is a lively rondo with a little development in minor keys of the A subject before the final restatement in D major. Though the bassoon is for the most part doubling the cellos, towards the end Haydn has them imitate the twirls of the first violins a bar after, lending a hint of wit redolent of Joseph Haydn's rondo finales.
