= Symphony No. 5 (Michael Haydn) =

Michael Haydn's Symphony No. 5 in A major, Perger 3, Sherman 5, MH 63, written in Salzburg in 1763, is the third of twelve symphonies in the key to be mistaken for a symphony by Joseph Haydn (Hob. I:A3). The symphony is scored for two oboes, two bassoons, two horns, and strings. It has four movements:

1. Allegro molto
2. Andante ma non troppo in E major
3. Menuetto e Trio (the latter in A minor)
4. Presto

== Discography ==
Included in Disc 2 of a set of 20 symphonies on the CPO label with Bohdan Warchal conducting the Slovak Philharmonic.
