= Symphony No. 3 (Michael Haydn) =

1763 symphony

Michael Haydn's Symphony No. 3 in G major, also known as Divertimento in G major, Sherman 3, MH 26, was written in Oradea (then known as Großwardein) in 1763, according to the Göttweig catalog. It is not listed in the Perger catalog. Mozart's Salzburg Symphonies (K136-138) are examples of symphonies that were also called divertimenti (Guy, 1999).

The symphony is scored for two oboes, two bassoons, two horns, strings, and continuo. It has four movements:

1. Allegro molto
2. Andante
3. Menuetto e Trio
4. Presto
