= Symphony No. 14 (Michael Haydn) =

Symphony in three movements by Joseph Haydn

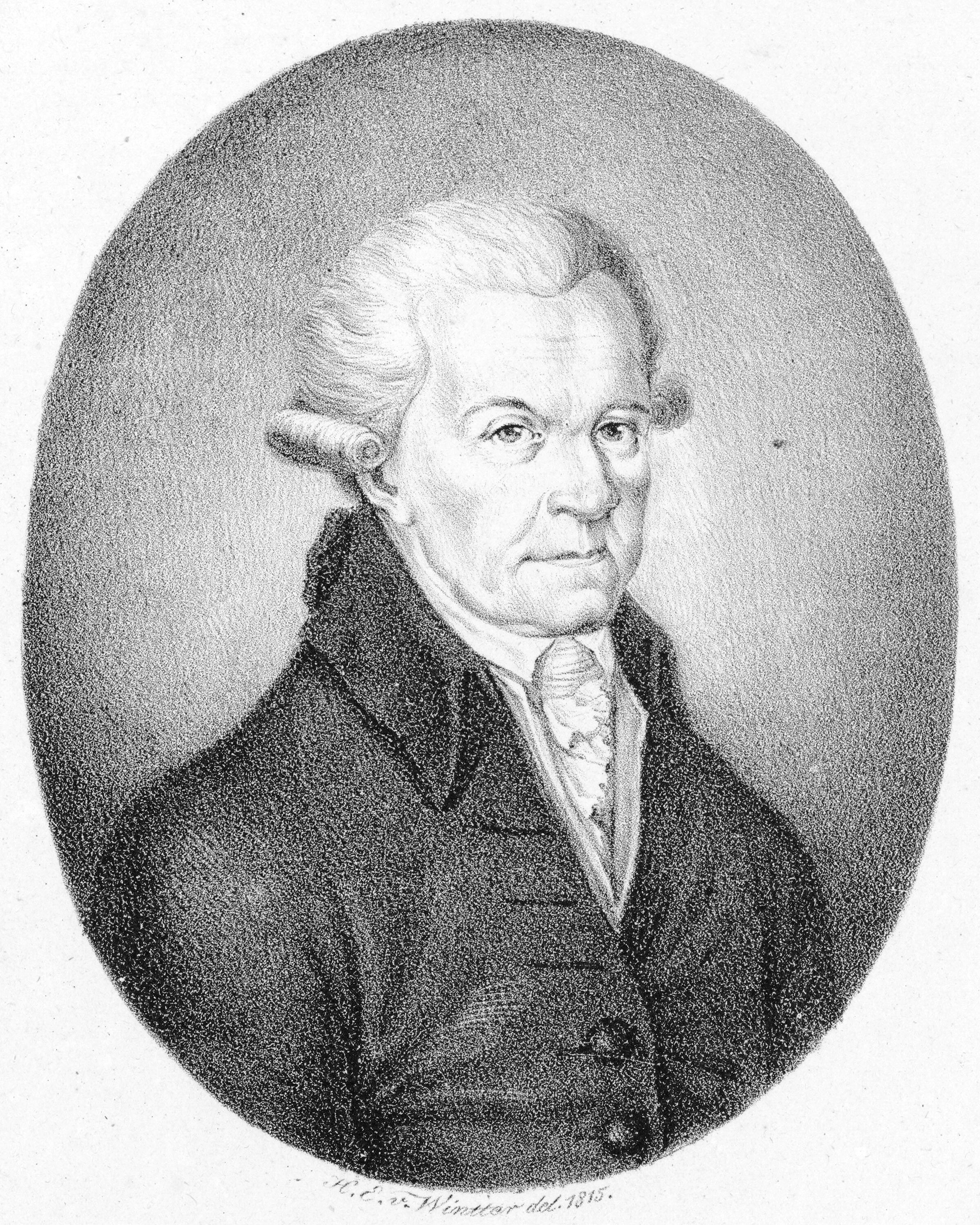
Portrait of composer Michael Haydn

Michael Haydn's Symphony No. 14 in B♭ major, Perger 52, Sherman 14, MH 133, was written in Salzburg between 1768 and 1770 For some reason, Lothar Perger believed it to be the last symphony Michael Haydn ever wrote. This work was at one time attributed to Joseph Haydn, the third work in B♭ major so attributed.

The score is unusual for a number of reasons: the second movement contains an extended concerto-like solo for bassoon, and is subtitled "Concertino per il Fagotto”. In addition to the normal complement of strings, two oboes and two bassoons, it calls for four four horns.

It is in three movements:

1. Allegro molto
2. Adagio ma non troppo ("Concertino per il Fagotto”),
3. Menuetto e Trio

N.B. The recording on Olympia OCD 404 claiming to be of this Symphony is in fact that of P.9 Symphony 11.
