= Symphony No. 28 (Michael Haydn) =

Symphony by Michael Haydn

Michael Haydn's Symphony No. 28 in C major, Opus 1 No. 2, Perger 19, Sherman 28, MH 384, was written in Salzburg in 1784, was the third and last symphony published in his lifetime. The publisher, Artaria, also published several of Joseph Haydn's symphonies. The symphony is scored for two oboes, two bassoons, two horns, two trumpets, timpani and strings. It is in three movements:

1. Allegro spiritoso
2. Un poco adagio, in F major
3. Fugato: Vivace assai

This is the first of Haydn's symphonies to conclude with the kind of fugato "that Haydn introduced in several of his late symphonies and which so clearly forecast Mozart's procedures in the Jupiter Symphony." (Sherman, 1988)

Charles Sherman based his 1988 edition of the score for Ludwig Doblinger on the Artaria edition but compared it with a Breitkopf & Härtel score of 1895 and manuscript parts from the Kroměříž castle in Moravia.
