= Symphony No. 8 (Michael Haydn) =

Michael Haydn's Symphony No. 8 in D major, Perger 38, Sherman 8, Sherman-adjusted 10, MH 69, is believed to have been written in Salzburg, some time after 1764. The symphony is scored for flute, two oboes, two bassoons, two horns, two trumpets, timpani and strings. It has four movements:

1. Allegro molto
2. Andante in G major
3. Menuetto with Trio in D minor
4. Presto

The Andante and Menuetto feature significant parts for solo bassoon. The Presto finale calls for solo roles for clarinet, bassoon and horn.
