= Symphony No. 17 (Michael Haydn) =

Michael Haydn's Symphony No. 17 in E major, Perger 44, Sherman 17, MH 151, is believed to have been written in Salzburg after 1771. It is the third of four E-major symphonies formerly attributed to Joseph Haydn.

The symphony is scored for two flutes, two oboes, two bassoons, two horns and strings. It has four movements:

1. Allegro
2. Andante (in A major)
3. Menuetto and Trio (with the Trio in E minor)
4. Allegro con spirit

Horns in E are used in the whole piece except for the Andante (oboes stay) and the trio (has a flute solo).
