= Symphony No. 20 (Michael Haydn) =

Michael Haydn's Symphony No. 20 in C major, Perger 12, Sherman 20, MH 252, written in Salzburg in 1777, is one of the few of his symphonies to have a slow movement in a minor key, and one of his few C major symphonies to not include trumpets or timpani.

The symphony is scored for two oboes, two bassoons, two horns, and strings. It is in four movements:

1. Allegro molto
2. Andante, in A minor
3. Menuetto e Trio, both in F major
4. Presto

== Discography ==
An LP was released in 1983 on EMI by the Bournemouth Sinfonietta conducted by Harold Farberman. This was reissued on Vox Box CDX 5020. There is also a recording by the Franz Liszt Chamber Orchestra of Budapest, conducted by János Rolla, on Teldec 8.43188 (no longer available).
