= Symphony No. 11 (Michael Haydn) =

Michael Haydn's Symphony No. 11 in B♭ major, Perger 9, Sherman 11, MH 82 and 184, was written in Salzburg in 1766. Hans Gál attributed this work to Joseph Haydn, but he was not the first to do so (Hoboken's catalog lists this as the second symphony in B♭ major so attributed). Movements of it were published as a Joseph Haydn work, in fact, in 1772.

The symphony is scored for two oboes, two bassoons, two horns, and strings. It is in four movements:

1. Allegro assai
2. Andantino, in F major
3. Minuet and Trio (trio in E♭ major)
4. Allegro molto

== Discography ==
This symphony is included in a set of 20 symphonies on the CPO label with Bohdan Warchal conducting the Slovak Philharmonic. It has also been recorded by the London Mozart Players conducted by Matthias Bamert on the Chandos label and by the Orchestre de Chambre de Lausanne conducted by Christian Zacharias. It is also on Olympia OCD 404 where it is wrongly listed as P.52 (Symphony 14).
