= Symphony No. 6 (Michael Haydn) =

Michael Haydn's Symphony No. 6 in C major, Perger 4, Sherman 6, Sherman-adjusted 8, MH 64, was written in Salzburg, completed in 1764. It is the 31st symphony in C major attributed to Joseph Haydn in Anthony van Hoboken's catalog. The work is scored for two oboes, two bassoons, two horns, and strings. It has three movements:

1. Vivace
2. Andante in C minor
3. Tempo di Menuetto
