= Deutsche Kammerakademie Neuss =

Chamber orchestra based in Neuss, Germany

The Deutsche Kammerakademie Neuss am Rhein (dkn) is a chamber orchestra based in Neuss, Germany, specializing in obscure music from the baroque and classical periods as well as new music commissioned especially for them.

The group was founded in 1978 by the cellist and conductor Johannes Goritzki. Their current artistic director is Isabelle van Keulen, their chief conductor is Christoph Koncz.

The CD catalog of the Deutsche Kammerakademie Neuss am Rhein, usually on the CPO label, includes little known repertoire such as Michael Haydn's Requiem and assorted symphonies, Robert Volkmann's Serenades, Othmar Schoeck's Cello Concerto, as well as better known pieces such as Bach's Mass in B minor and two Beethoven symphonies.
