= Symphony No. 24 (Michael Haydn) =

Michael Haydn's Symphony No. 24 in A major, Perger 15, Sherman 24, MH 302, was written in Salzburg in 1781. The symphony is scored for two flutes, two oboes, two bassoons, two horns, posthorn, and strings.

It has four movements:

1. Allegro con brio
2. Andante cantabile, in D major
3. Minuet and Trio
4. Presto

The posthorn gets a solo in the trio of the minuet.
