= Symphony No. 33 (Michael Haydn) =

Michael Haydn's Symphony No. 33 in B♭ major, Perger 24, Sherman 33, MH 425/652, was mostly written in Salzburg in 1786. Eight years after he stopped writing symphonies, Haydn re-examined this work and decided to add a minuet to it. The minuet is listed in the Sherman & Donley catalog as MH 652, with a cross-reference from MH 425.

The symphony is scored for two oboes, two bassoons, two horns, two trumpets, timpani, and strings. It is in four movements:

1. Vivace
2. Adagietto cantabile, in F major
3. Minuet and Trio (1797)
4. Presto mà non troppo
