= Symphony No. 41 (Michael Haydn) =

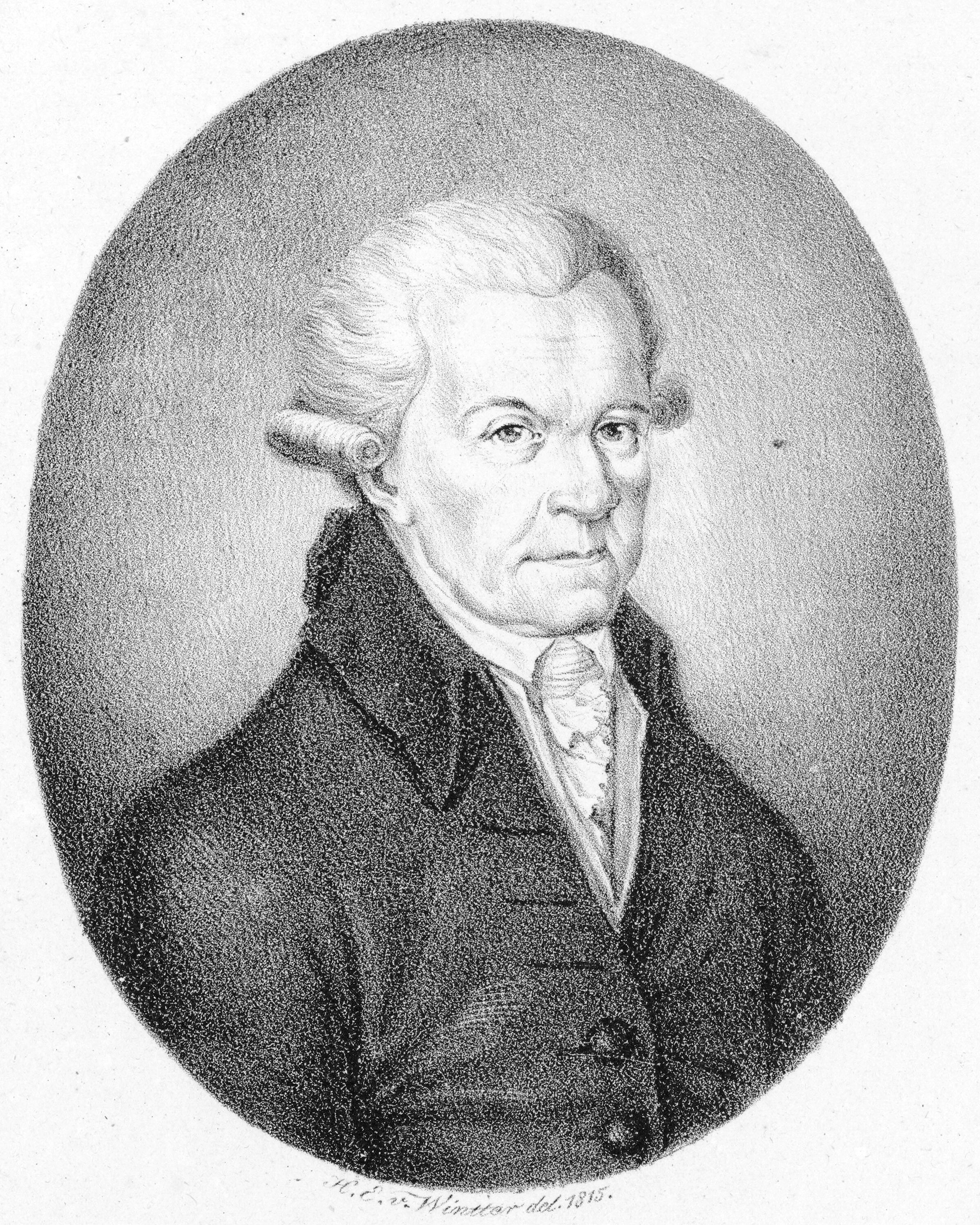
Portrait of composer Michael Haydn

Michael Haydn's Symphony No. 41 in A major, Perger 33, Sherman 41, MH 508, written in Salzburg in 1789, is the last symphony he wrote (he lived for 17 more years). The symphony is scored for two oboes, two bassoons, two horns, and strings. It is in three movements:

1. Spiritoso
2. Andante, in D major
3. Fugato. Vivace molto.

The last movement is a vigorous fugato, something this work has in common with Mozart's Symphony No. 41.

== Discography ==
This symphony has been recorded on LP by the Little Orchestra of London and the RIAS-Sinfonietta Berlin.
