= Bohdan Warchal =

Czechoslovak violinist and conductor (1930–2000)

Bohdan Warchal (27 January 1930 in Orlová, Czechoslovakia – 30 December 2000 in Bratislava, Slovakia) was a Slovak violinist, a member of the Slovak Philharmonic Orchestra and founder, chief conductor and soloist of the Slovak Chamber Orchestra.

His Naxos Records discography includes the Bach Brandenburg Concerti and Handel's Water and Fireworks Music. For cpo he has recorded many of Michael Haydn's symphonies.

== Positions ==
- 1957 – 1964 – concertmaster of the Slovak Philharmonic Orchestra
- 1964 – artistic leader of the Slovak Chamber Orchestra
- 1959 – 1963 – external pedagogue at the State Conservatory Bratislava
- 1980 – pedagogue at the Academy of Performing Arts in Bratislava
- 1995 – moved from the Slovak Philharmonic Orchestra to the Prague Chamber Orchestra
- 1997 – became the leader of the Slovak Chamber Orchestra again

== See also ==
- The 100 Greatest Slovak Albums of All Time
