= Classic Produktion Osnabrück =

German record label

- Parent company: jpc
- Founded: 1986
- Founder: Georg Ortmann
- Genre: Classical
- Country of origin: Germany
- Location: Georgsmarienhütte, Lower Saxony

Classic Produktion Osnabrück (often referred to as cpo, in lowercase) is a record label founded in 1986 by Georg Ortmann and several others. Its declared mission is to fill niches in the recorded classical repertory, with an emphasis on romantic, late romantic, and 20th-century music. The label also aims to release complete cycles of recordings, such as complete sets of symphonies, concertos, chamber music, and so forth. It is the house label of online retailer jpc.

== Recordings ==
Recordings issued by cpo include:

- Concertos, suites, cantates, and chamber music by Georg Philipp Telemann
- The complete orchestral works and string quartets of Paul Hindemith
- The complete string quartets of Mieczysław Weinberg
- The complete orchestral works of Erich Wolfgang Korngold
- The complete symphonies and select orchestral and chamber works of Ernst Krenek
- The orchestral works of Hans Pfitzner (and a substantial amount of his chamber works as well)
- The symphonies and string quartets of Benjamin Frankel
- The symphonies and orchestral works of Théodore Gouvy
- The symphonies, concertos and string quartets of Ahmet Adnan Saygun
- The symphonies and overtures of Ferdinand Ries
- The symphonies and overtures of Friedrich Ernst Fesca
- The orchestral works (symphonies and overtures) of Louise Farrenc (and a substantial amount of her chamber works as well)
- The symphonies, violin concerto and requiem of Richard Wetz
- The symphonies of Hendrik Andriessen
- The symphonies of Kurt Atterberg
- The symphonies of Allan Pettersson
- The symphonies of Wilhelm Peterson-Berger
- The symphonies of Ture Rangström
- The symphonies of Humphrey Searle
- The symphonies of George Onslow
- The complete symphonies and (select) concertos of Aulis Sallinen
- The complete wind quintets of Anton Reicha
- The Complete Symphonic works of Siegmund von Hausegger
- The symphonies of Darius Milhaud
- The violin concertos and symphonies of Louis Spohr
- The symphonies of Josef Tal

Some of these works (for example, most of the Hindemith compositions, Spohr's symphonies, some of Spohr's concertos, and various Pfitzner orchestral pieces) had been recorded in the past, by other performers on other labels; but quite a few of them had not.

== Personnel ==
- Gerhard Georg Ortmann – Managing Director
- Burkhard Schmilgun – Director Artists & Repertoire

== Awards ==
- 2014 Grammy
- 2017 Telemann Prize

== See also ==
- List of record labels
