= Symphony No. 30 (Michael Haydn) =

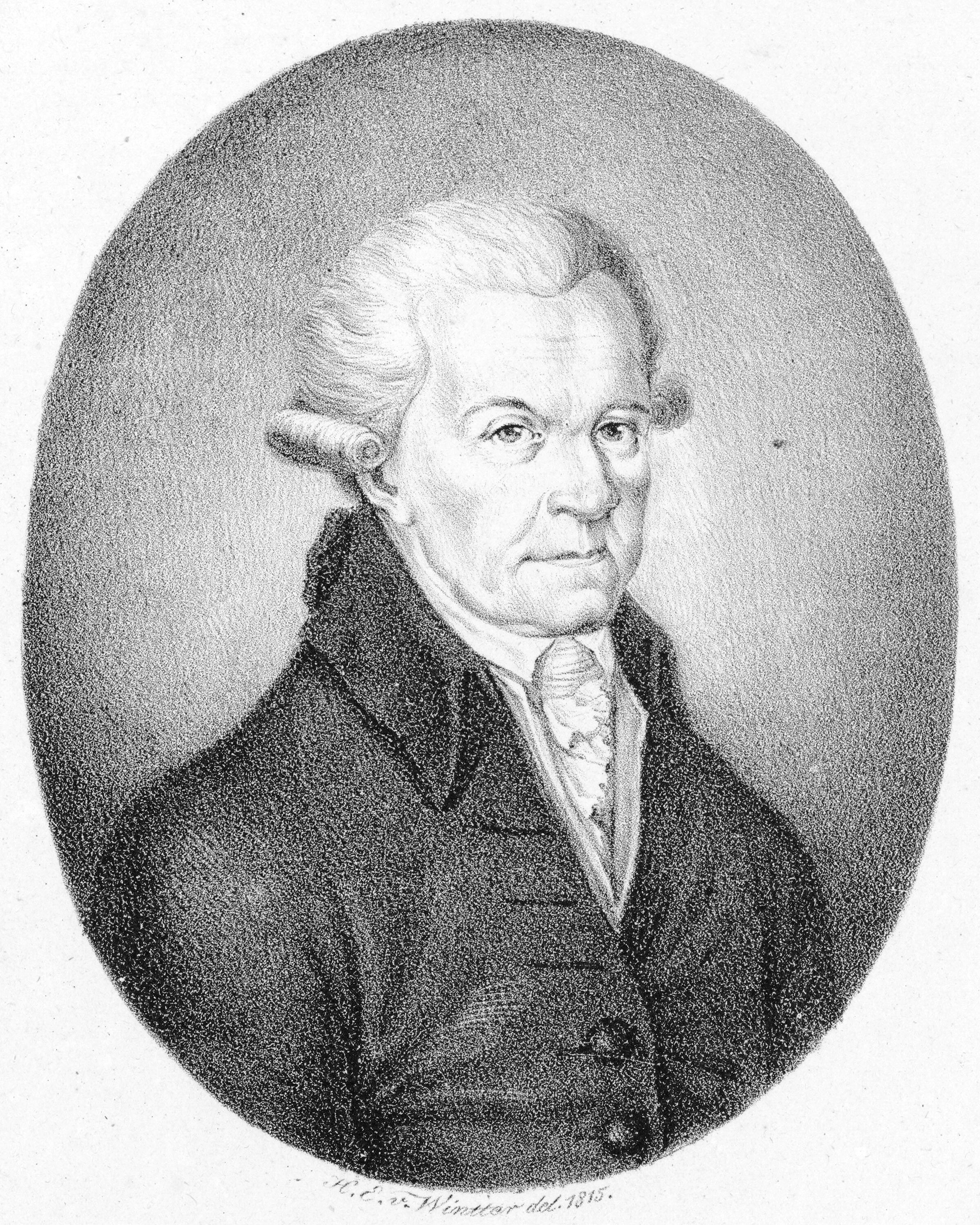
Portrait of composer Michael Haydn

Michael Haydn's Symphony No. 30 in D major, Perger 21, Sherman 30, MH 399, was written in Salzburg in 1785. Scored for two oboes, two bassoons, two horns, and strings, the symphony is in three movements:

1. Adagio – Allegro spiritoso
2. Andante sostenuto, in G major
3. Vivace molto

This symphony is the last of four by Michael Haydn to include a slow introduction before the first movement (the others are Symphonies Nos. 21, 22, and 27). All four were written between 1778 and 1785 and attached to symphonies cast in three movements (without minuets).

== Discography ==
On the CPO label, this symphony is available on a CD that also includes Symphonies Nos. 21, 31 and 32. There is also an Olympia remastering to CD from an LP recording of Ervin Acél conducting the Oradea Philharmonic; that one also includes Symphonies Nos. 18 and 29 (the latter with Miron Raţiu instead of Acél).
