= Missa tempore Quadragesimae (Michael Haydn) =

- Mass by Michael Haydn
- The composer of the Mass for Lent
- Key: D minor
- Catalogue: MH 553
- Form: Missa brevis
- Occasion: Lent, also Advent
- Text: Mass ordinary without Gloria
- Language: Latin
- Composed: 1794
- Published: c. 1820: Augsburg
- Movements: 4
- Vocal: SATB choir
- Instrumental: organ

The Missa tempore Quadragesimae (Mass for the time of Lent), Klafsky 1:19, MH 553, is a mass without a Gloria by Michael Haydn. The work in D minor was written in 1794 in Salzburg, scored for a four-part choir and organ. It is suitable also for Advent.

== History ==
Michael Haydn composed the mass as a director of music in Salzburg under Archbishop Colloredo. According to a recording's notes, the "Missa is perfectly in accord with the then current ideals for reform in the Catholic Church: functional, short, simple, modest and linked to the Gregorian tradition."

== Scoring and structure ==
The autograph is titled: "Missa, tempore Quadragesimae. à 4 Voci in pieno, col Organo. Di Giov: Michele Haydn" (Mass for Lent for four voices, with organ by Giov. Michele Haydn). In the following table of the movements, the markings, keys and time signatures are taken from the choral score of the Carus edition, using the symbol for alla breve (2/2).

| Part | Incipit | Marking | Key | Time |
|---|---|---|---|---|
| Kyrie | Kyrie | Un poco Allegretto | D minor | 6/8 |
| Credo | Credo | Vivace | D minor | cut time |
| Credo | Et incarnatus est | Corale. Adagio | D minor | free |
| Credo | Et resurrexit | Allegro | D minor | 3/4 |
| Sanctus – Benedictus | Sanctus | Larghetto | D minor | cut time |
| Sanctus – Benedictus | Benedictus | Andante | F major | cut time |
| Agnus Dei | Agnus Dei | Adagio | D minor | 3/4 |

== Publication ==
The mass was first published around 1820, possibly 1827, in Augsburg by Anton Böhme, titled Missa in tempore Adventus et Quadragesimae and supplemented by J. Eybler, who added a Gloria and a second Et incarnatus. It appeared in Vienna in 1915, edited by Anton Maria Klafsky, in Denkmäler der Tonkunst in Österreich, volume 45, by the Österreichischer Bundesverlag.

== Recordings ==
The mass was recorded in 2006 by the Ex Tempore choir, conducted by Florian Heyerick, together with other works by the composer. A review notes its "beautiful, concise soberness unlike anything in the Mozart oeuvre or that of anyone else", pointing at the section "Et incarnatus est" which is free in tempo, similar to harmonized chant. The mass was recorded in 2008 by the Purcell Choir, conducted by György Vashegyi, combined with other lenten music by the composer, titled Sacred music for the season of Lent. A reviewer notes the homophonic setting and simple rhythm, resulting in a floating meditative sound.

== Sources ==
- Missa tempore Quadragesima, MH 553: Scores at the International Music Score Library Project
- Johann Michael Haydn: Missa Tempore Quadragesimae Carus-Verlag
- "Missa tempore Quadragesimae : MH 553 (1794) : à 4 voci in pieno, col'organo : per coro SATB, organo e violone / Michael Haydn; herausgegeben von Charles H. Sherman". franklin.library.upenn.edu. Archived from the original on December 5, 2014.
