= Op. 1 =

In music, Op. 1 stands for Opus number 1. Compositions that are assigned this number include:

- Bach – Partitas for keyboard
- Bartók – Rhapsody
- Beethoven – Piano Trios, Op. 1
- Berg – Piano Sonata
- Brahms – Piano Sonata No. 1
- Chopin – Rondo in C minor
- Clara Schumann – 4 Polonaises
- Clifford – Symphony in E-flat
- Dvořák – String Quintet No. 1 in A minor
- Elgar – Romance for violin
- Goeyvaerts – Sonata for Two Pianos
- Mendelssohn – Piano Quartet No. 1
- Michael Haydn – Symphony No. 27
- Michael Haydn – Symphony No. 28
- Michael Haydn – Symphony No. 29
- Mozart – Violin Sonata No. 18
- Mozart – Violin Sonata No. 19
- Mozart – Violin Sonata No. 20
- Prokofiev – Piano Sonata No. 1
- Rachmaninoff – Piano Concerto No. 1
- Schönberg – Zwei Gesänge
- Schubert – Erlkönig
- Schumann – Variations on the name "Abegg"
- Shostakovich - Scherzo in F-sharp minor
- Sibelius – Five Christmas Songs, collection of art songs (1897–1913)
- Stamitz – Trios, Op. 1
- J. Strauss I – Täuberln-Walzer
- J. Strauss II – Sinngedichte
- Stravinsky – Symphony in E-flat
- Sullivan – The Tempest
- Tchaikovsky – Scherzo à la russe
- Turina – Piano Quintet
- Vivaldi – Twelve Trio Sonatas, Op. 1
- Waterhouse – String Sextet
- Webern – Passacaglia for orchestra

== See also ==
- Opus One (disambiguation)
- OP1 (disambiguation)
