= Piano Concerto No. 21 (Mozart) =

1785 composition by W. A. Mozart

- Elvira Madigan
- by W. A. Mozart
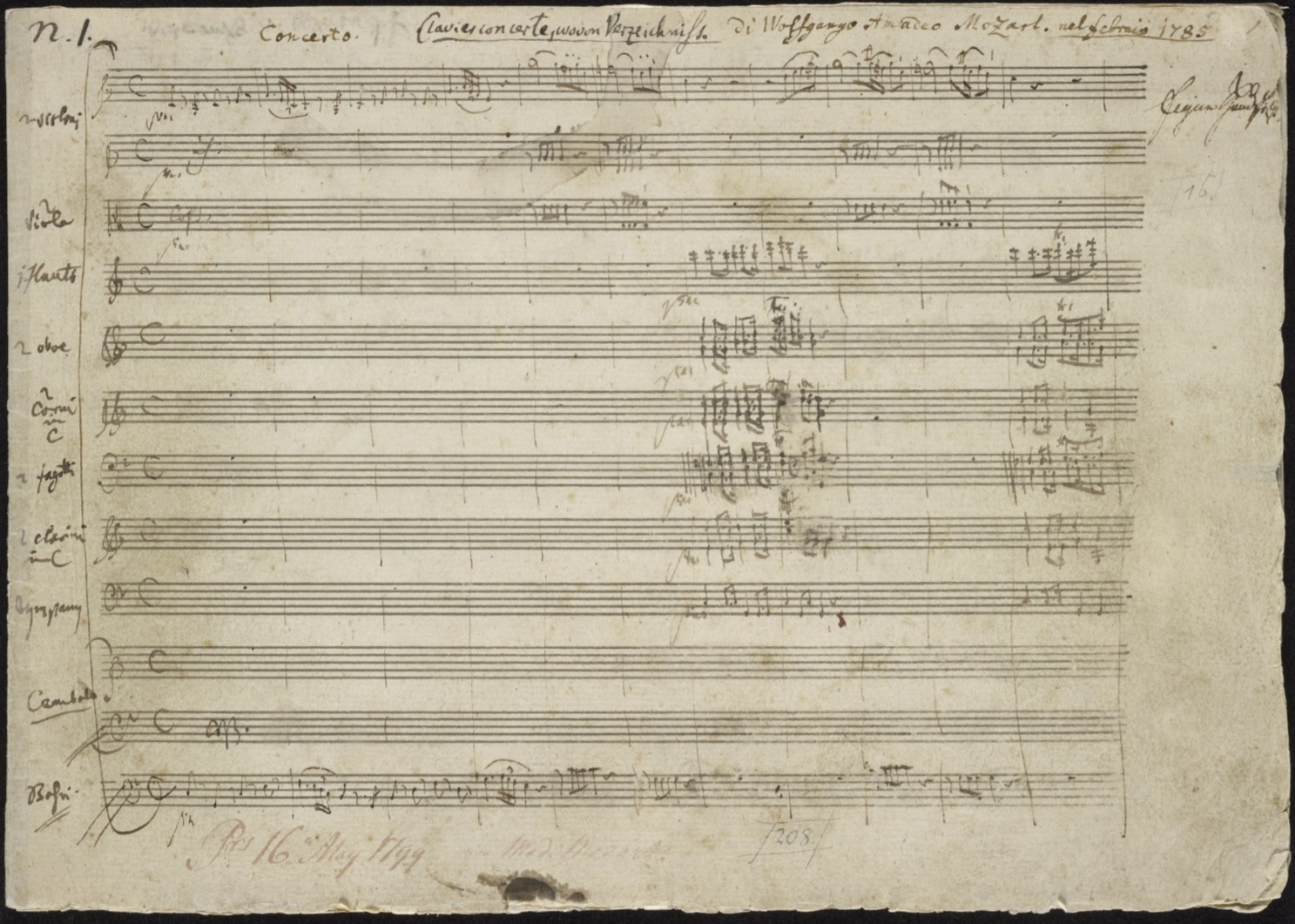
- First page of the autograph manuscript
- Key: C major
- Catalogue: K. 467
- Composed: Vienna, 1785
- Duration: c. 30 minutes
- Movements: 3
- Scoring: Piano; orchestra

The Piano Concerto No. 21 in C major, K. 467, was completed on 9 March 1785 by Wolfgang Amadeus Mozart, four weeks after the completion of the previous D minor concerto, K. 466.

The autograph manuscript of the concerto is preserved in the Morgan Library & Museum, New York City.

A typical performance of the concerto lasts roughly 30 minutes.

== Structure ==
Piano Concerto No. 21
II. Andante (part 5)

II. Andante (part 6)
Both parts with Artur Schnabel with the London Symphony Orchestra conducted by Malcolm Sargent in 1937 (3:49)

III. Allegro vivace assai
Performed by Giorgi Latso, piano; David L. Wen, conductor; Hsinchu Chamber Orchestra, Taiwan

The concerto is scored for solo piano, flute, two oboes, two bassoons, two horns in C, two trumpets in C, timpani and strings.

The concerto has three movements:

1. Allegro maestoso in C major,
2. Andante in F major,
3. Allegro vivace assai, 2/4

=== I. Allegro maestoso ===
The tempo marking is in Mozart's catalog of his own works, but not in the autograph manuscript.

The opening movement begins quietly with a march figure but quickly moves to a more lyrical melody interspersed with a fanfare in the winds. The music grows abruptly in volume, with the violins taking up the principal melody over the march theme, which is now played by the brass. This uplifting theme transitions to a brief, quieter interlude distinguished by a sighing motif in the brass. The march returns, eventually transitioning to the entrance of the soloist. The soloist plays a brief Eingang (a type of abbreviated cadenza) before resolving to a trill on the dominant G while the strings play the march in C major.

The piano then introduces new material in C major and begins transitioning to the dominant key of G major. Immediately after an orchestral cadence finally announces the arrival of the dominant, the music abruptly shifts to G minor in a passage that foreshadows the main theme of the Symphony No. 40 in that key. A series of rising and falling chromatic scales then transition the music to the true second theme of the piece, an ebullient G major theme, which can also be heard in a different phrasing in Mozart's Horn Concerto No. 3.

The usual development and recapitulation follow. There is a cadenza at the end of the movement, although Mozart's original has been lost.

=== II. Andante ===
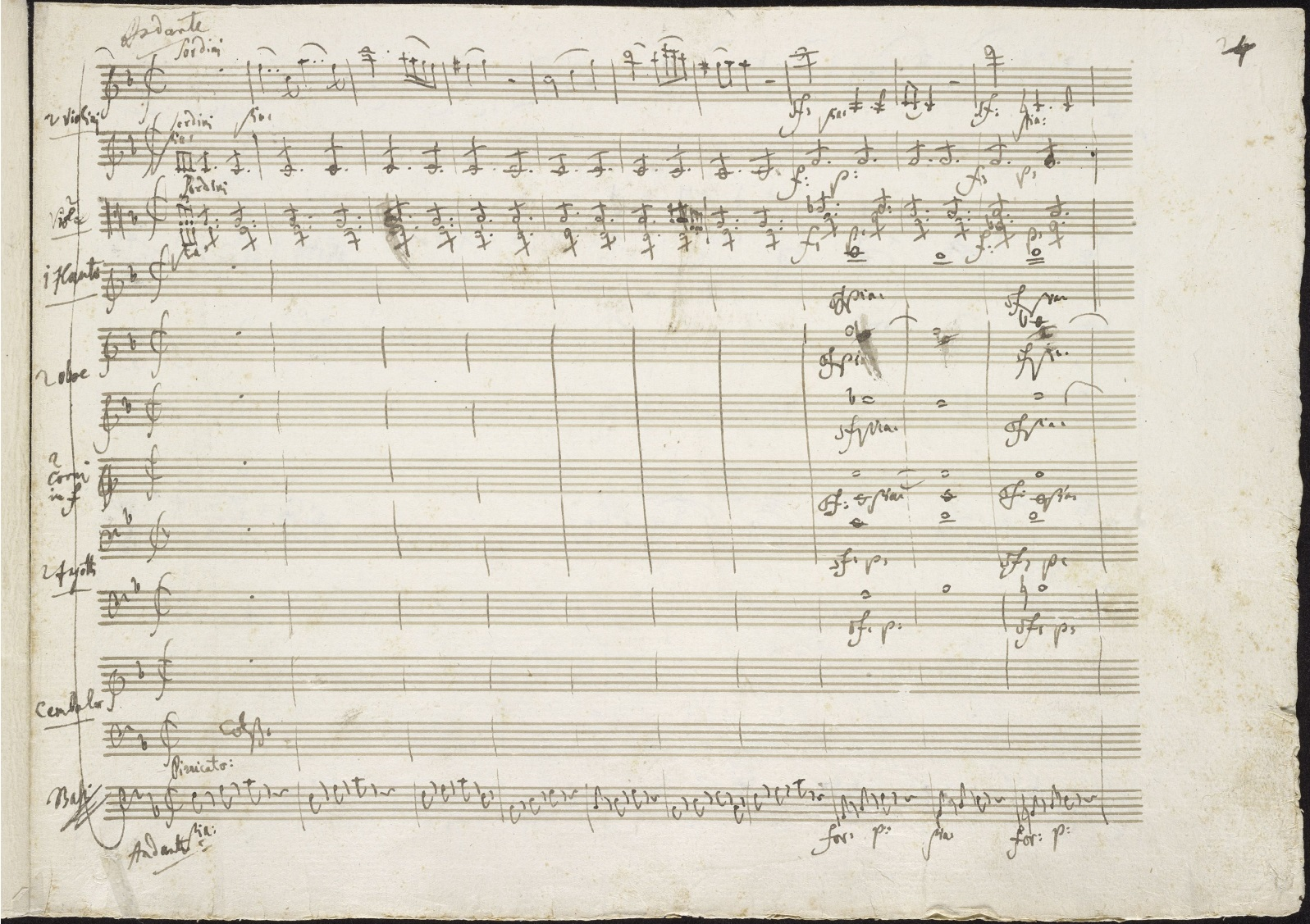
Opening of the second movement in Mozart's handwriting

The Andante movement, in the subdominant key of F major, is in three parts. The opening section is for orchestra only and features muted strings. The first violins play a dreamlike melody over an accompaniment consisting of second violins and violas playing repeated-note triplets and the cellos and bass playing pizzicato arpeggios. All of the main melodic material of the movement is contained in this orchestral introduction, in either F major or F minor.

The second section introduces the solo piano and starts off in F major. It is not a literal repeat, though, as after the first few phrases, new material is interjected which ventures off into different keys. When familiar material returns, the music is now in the dominant keys of C minor and C major. Then it modulates to G minor, then B♭ major, then F minor, which transitions to the third section of the movement.

The third section begins with the dreamlike melody again, but this time in the relative key of F major's parallel key, A♭ major. Over the course of this final section, the music makes its way back to the tonic keys of F minor and then F major and a short coda concludes the movement.

=== III. Allegro vivace assai ===
The final rondo movement begins with the full orchestra espousing a joyous theme. After a short cadenza, the piano joins in with a theme reminiscent of the finale of Michael Haydn's Symphony No. 18 in C major and further elaborates. A "call and response" style is apparent, with the piano and ensemble exchanging themes. The soloist plays scale and arpeggio figurations that enhance the themes, as well as a short cadenza that leads back to the main theme. The main theme appears one final time, leading to an upward rush of scales that ends on a triumphant note.

== Cultural references ==
- The second movement was featured in the 1967 Bo Widerberg film Elvira Madigan, using a recording by Géza Anda as the soloist. As a result, the piece has become widely known as the Elvira Madigan concerto.
- Neil Diamond's 1972 song "Song Sung Blue" was based on a theme from the andante movement of the concerto.
- In the 1977 James Bond film, The Spy Who Loved Me, villain Karl Stromberg plays the concerto as his lair Atlantis rises from the sea.
- The second movement is used for the main theme of the weather program TV Tiempo of Televisión Nacional de Chile.
- The opening theme of the 1983/84 TV series Whiz Kids is an electronic version adaptation of the concerto's first movement.
