= Symphony No. 18 (Michael Haydn) =

Michael Haydn's Symphony No. 18 in C major, Perger 10, Sherman 18, MH 188, written in Salzburg in 1773, is the fifth of the C major symphonies attributed to Joseph Haydn in Hoboken's catalog. The symphony is scored for two oboes, two English horns, two fifes, three bassoons, tamburo, and strings. It has four movements:

1. Allegro molto
2. Andante, in F major
3. Minuet and Trio
4. Vivace

The minuet is unusual in that it has a composed coda (as opposed to a mere da capo repeat after the trio) something which would become standard in the scherzi of Beethoven.

== Discography ==
Included in a set of 20 symphonies on the CPO label with Bohdan Warchal conducting the Slovak Philharmonic, as well as an Olympia CD remastering of Ervin Acél's recording with the Oradea Philharmonic, which comes with Symphonies No.s 29 and 30. It has also been recorded by the Warsaw Sinfonietta conducted by Wojciech Czepiel. An LP was released in 1983 on EMI by the Bournemouth Sinfonietta conducted by Harold Farberman.
