= Symphony No. 21 (Michael Haydn) =

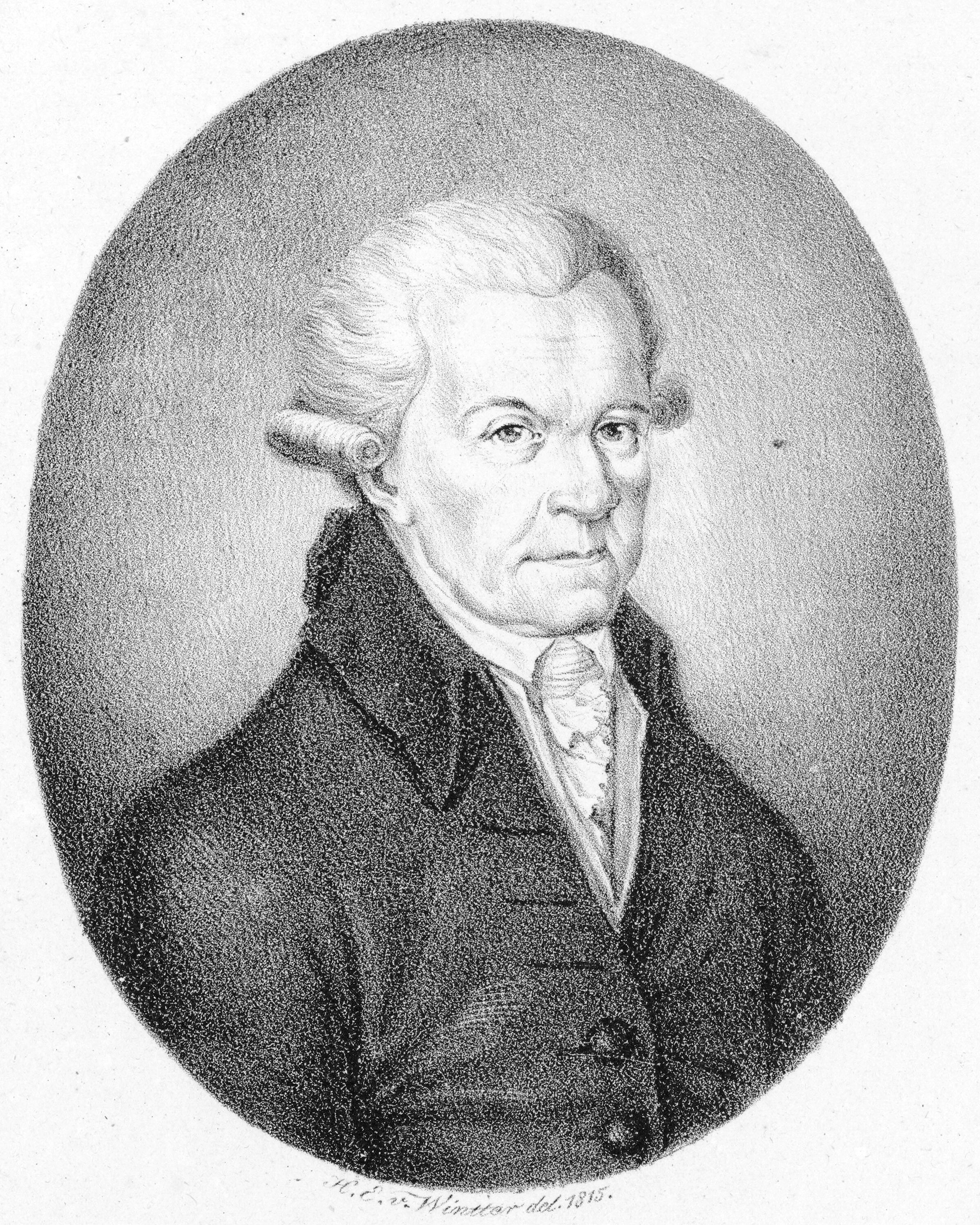
Portrait of composer Michael Haydn

Michael Haydn's Symphony No. 21 in D major, Perger 42, Sherman 21, MH 272, written in 1778, is believed to have been written in Salzburg. The symphony is scored for two oboes, two bassoons, two horns, and strings. It is in three movements:

1. Adagio – Allegro molto
2. Andante, in A major
3. Presto

This symphony is the first of four by Michael Haydn to include a slow introduction before the first movement (the others are Symphonies Nos. 22, 27, and 30). All four were written between 1778 and 1785 and attached to symphonies cast in three movements (without minuets).

== Discography ==
On the CPO label, this symphony is available on a CD that also includes Symphonies Nos. 30, 31 and 32; Johannes Goritzki conducting the Deutsche Kammerakademie Neuss.
