= Missa Hispanica =

Austrian composer

Portrait of Michael Haydn by Franz Xaver Hornöck

Austrian composer, Michael Haydn's Missa Hispanica or Missa a due cori, Klafsky I:17, MH 422, was presumably written for Spain, but there is no evidence of its ever having been performed there during Haydn's lifetime. The mass is scored for 2 oboes, 2 bassoons, 2 horns in low C, F and G, 2 trumpets in C, timpani, strings, basso continuo, SATB soloists, and two mixed choirs.

The mass setting is divided into the usual six movements:

1. "Kyrie" Largo, C major, common time
  —"Kyrie eleison" Allegro, 3/4
2. "Gloria" Allegro con spirito, C major, common time
  —"Qui tollis peccata mundi..." Adagio, F major, 3/4
  —"Quoniam tu solus sanctus..." Vivace, C major, common time
3. "Credo" Vivace, C major, 3/4
  —"Et incarnatus est..." Adagio molto, G major, 2/4
  —"Et resurrexit..." Allegro spiritoso, C major, 3/4
4. "Sanctus" Andante con moto, C major, common time
5. "Benedictus" Allegro moderato, C major, 3/4
  —"Osanna..." Allegro, C major, common time
6. "Agnus Dei" Largo, C major, 3/4
  —"Dona nobis pacem..." Allegro con fuoco, C major, common time

The Austrian premiere was in Kremsmünster on June 24, 1792, a performance in Salzburg followed in 1796. When Empress Marie Therese visited Salzburg in 1805, she liked the music so much she wanted to have her own copy of the score.
