= Symphony in D =

Symphony in D can refer to:

- List of symphonies in D minor
- List of symphonies in D major

== See also ==
- List of symphonies by key
