= Symphony No. 22 (Michael Haydn) =

Michael Haydn's Symphony No. 22 in F major, Perger 14, Sherman 23, Sherman-adjusted 22, MH 284, was written in Salzburg in 1779. The symphony is scored for two oboes, two bassoons, two horns, and strings. It is in three movements:

1. Adagio – Presto
2. Andante, in B♭ major
3. Vivace assai

This symphony is the second of four by Michael Haydn to include a slow introduction before the first movement (the others are Symphonies Nos. 21, 27, and 30). All four were written between 1778 and 1785 and attached to symphonies cast in three movements (without minuets).
