= List of symphonies in D minor =

This is a list of symphonies in D minor written by notable composers.

Baroque and Classical symphonies in D minor usually used 2 horns in F (whereas for most other minor keys 2 or 4 horns were used, half in the tonic and half in the relative major). Michael Haydn's Symphony No. 29 in D minor is notable for using two trumpets in D (the horns are in F but change to D for the coda of the finale). In the Romantic era, D minor symphonies, like symphonies in almost any other key, used horns in F and trumpets in B♭.

The first choice of clarinet for orchestral music in D minor is naturally the clarinet in B♭. This choice, however, becomes problematic for multi-movement works that begin in D minor and end in D major, as the clarinet in A would be preferable for the parallel major. One solution is to write the first movement for clarinet in B♭ and the last movement for clarinet in A, but this burdens the player with having to warm up the A instrument in time for the switch.

== List ==
Composer	Symphony
Kurt Atterberg	Symphony No. 5 "Sinfonia Funebre", Op. 20 (1917–22)
Johann Christoph Friedrich Bach	Symphony in D minor, BR-JCFB C 4 / Wf I/3 (ca. 1768)
Ernst Bacon	Symphony (1932)
Edgar Bainton	Symphony No. 2 (1939–40)
Mily Balakirev	Symphony No. 2 (1900–08)
Franz Ignaz Beck	Symphony, Op. 3, No. 5
Ludwig van Beethoven	Symphony No. 9 "Choral", Op. 125 (1822–24)
Victor Bendix	Symphony No. 4, Op. 30 (1904–06, rev 1916)
Adolphe Biarent	Symphony (1908)
Vilém Blodek	Symphony (1858–59)
Luigi Boccherini	Symphony No. 4, Op. 12/4, G. 506 La casa del diavolo (1771); Symphony No. 15, Op. 37/3, G. 517 (1787); Symphony No. 20, Op. 45, G. 522 (1792)
Hjalmar Borgstrøm	Symphony No. 2, Op. 24 (1912)
Henry Brant	Symphony No. 2 (1942)
Havergal Brian	Symphony No. 1 "Gothic" (1919–27)
George Frederick Bristow	Symphony No. 2, Op. 24 "Jullien" (apparently written by 1854, premiered in 1856)
Anton Bruckner	Symphony No. 0 "Die Nullte" (1860s); Symphony No. 3 (1873); Symphony No. 9 (1896, inc.)
Fritz Brun	Symphony No. 3
Oscar Byström	Symphony (1870–72, rev. 1895)
Christian Cannabich	Symphony No. 50 (1772?)
Albert Dietrich	Symphony, Op. 20 (completed February 1870 at latest, dedicated to Johannes Brahms)
Ernst von Dohnányi	Symphony No. 1, Op. 9 (1900–01)
Antonín Dvořák	Symphony No. 4, Op. 13, B. 41 (1874); Symphony No. 7, Op. 70, B. 141 (1885)
John Lodge Ellerton	Symphony No. 3 "Wald-Symphonie", Op. 120 (about 1857)
Pietro Floridia	Symphony (1888)
Josef Bohuslav Foerster	Symphony No. 1, Op. 9 (1887); Symphony No. 5, Op. 141 (1929)
César Franck	Symphony in D minor
Niels Gade	Symphony No. 5, Op. 25 (1852)
John Gardner	Symphony No. 1, Op. 12 (1946–47)
Jan van Gilse	Symphony No. 3 "Elevation" (1906–07)
Alexander Glazunov	Symphony No. 9 (begun in 1910 but left unfinished by Glazunov's death in 1936. First movement orchestrated by Gavril Yudin in 1947)
Mikhail Glinka	Symphony in D minor "On Two Russian Themes" (1833/1937) left unfinished and completed by Vissarion Shebalin
Théodore Gouvy	Symphony No. 4, Op. 25. (1855)
Paul Graener	Symphony, Op. 39 (published 1912)
Julius Otto Grimm	Symphony, Op. 19 (performed in 1862)
Henry Kimball Hadley	Symphony No. 4, Op. 64 (1911)
Johan Halvorsen	Symphony No. 2 "Fate" (rev. 1928)
Joseph Haydn	Symphony No. 26 "Lamentatione" (1766); Symphony No. 34 (1767); Symphony No. 80 (1783–84)
Michael Haydn	Symphony No. 29, MH 393, Perger 20 (1784)
Hans Huber	Symphony No. 1 "Tell-Symphonie" Op. 63 (1880–01); Symphony No. 7 "Swiss" (premiered September 1917)
Jānis Ivanovs	Symphony No. 2 (1935)
Charles Ives	Symphony No. 1 (1898–1902)
Jan Kalivoda	Symphony No. 3, Op. 32 (premiered 1830)
Manolis Kalomiris	Symphony No. 3 (1955)
Hugo Kaun	Symphony No. 1, Op. 22 (1895), An mein Vaterland. Dem Andenken meines Vaters
August Klughardt	Symphony No. 1 "Lenore", Op. 27 (1873)
Joseph Martin Kraus	Sinfonia Da Chiesa, VB 147
Franz Lachner	Symphony No. 3, Op. 41 (1833–34); Symphony No. 7, Op. 58 (1839)
László Lajtha	Symphony No. 1, Op. 24 (1936)
Carl Loewe	Symphony in D minor
Gustav Mahler	Symphony No. 3 (1895–96)
Nina Makarova	Symphony (1938, revised 1962)
Otto Malling	Symphony, Op. 17 (by 1884)
Giuseppe Martucci	Symphony No. 1, Op. 75 (1888–95)
Felix Mendelssohn	Symphony No. 5, Op. 107 Reformation (1832)
Frank Merrick	Symphony in D minor (1912)
Ödön Mihalovich	Symphony (published about 1883.)
Nikolai Myaskovsky	Symphony No. 15, Op. 38 (1933–34)
Ludvig Norman	Symphony No. 3, Op. 58 (published 1885)
George Onslow	Symphony No. 2, Op. 42
Fredrik Pacius	Symphony (1850)
Gottfried von Preyer	Symphony No. 1, Op. 16
Florence Price	Symphony No. 4 (1945)
Sergei Prokofiev	Symphony No. 2, Op. 40 (1925)
Sergei Rachmaninoff	Symphony No. 1, Op. 13 (1896)
Joachim Raff	Symphony No. 6, Op. 189 (1873)
Ture Rangström	Symphony No. 2 "Mitt land" (1919); Symphony No. 4 "Invocation" for Organ and Orchestra (1936)
Napoléon Henri Reber	Symphony No. 1
Emil von Reznicek	Symphony No. 1 Tragic (1901)
Josef Rheinberger	Symphony No. 1 "Wallenstein", Op. 10 (premiered 1866)
Ferdinand Ries	Symphony No. 5, Op. 112 (1813)
Henri-Joseph Rigel	Symphony No. 10, Op. 21, No. 2
Albert Roussel	Symphony No. 1 "Le Poème de la forêt", Op. 7 (1904–06)
Anton Rubinstein	Symphony No. 4 "Dramatic", Op. 95 (1874)
Vadim Salmanov	Symphony No. 1 (1952)
Adolphe Samuel	Symphony No. 4, Op. 33 (1863); Symphony No. 6, Op. 44 (1891)
Philipp Scharwenka	Symphony, Op. 96 (published 1895)
Martin Scherber	Symphony No. 1 (1938)
Robert Schumann	Symphony No. 4, Op. 120 (1841)
Johanna Senfter	Symphony No. 2, Op. 27
Dmitri Shostakovich	Symphony No. 5, Op. 47 (1937); Symphony No. 12, Op. 112 "The Year 1917" (1961)
Jean Sibelius	Symphony No. 6, Op. 104 (1918–23)
Christian Sinding	Symphony No. 1, Op. 21 (1880–89)
Arthur Somervell	Symphony Thalassa
Louis Spohr	Symphony No. 2, Op. 49 (1820)
Charles Villiers Stanford	Symphony No. 2 "Elegiac"(1880); Symphony No. 7, Op. 124 (1911)
Richard Strauss	Symphony No. 1, AV 69 (1880)
Hermann Suter	Symphony, Op. 17 (1914)
Sergei Taneyev	Symphony No. 3 (1884)
Eduard Tubin	Symphony No. 3 "Heroic" (1940–42, revised 1968)
Ralph Vaughan Williams	Symphony No. 8 (1955)
Louis Vierne	Organ Symphony No. 1
Robert Volkmann	Symphony No. 1, Op. 44 (published 1863)
Johann Baptist Wanhal	Symphony, Bryan d1 (by 1773).; Symphony, Bryan d2 (with five horn parts)
Karl Weigl	Symphony No. 2 (1922)
Johann Wilhelm Wilms	Symphony No. 6, Op. 58
Richard Wüerst	Symphony, Op. 54 (published in 1869)
Alexander von Zemlinsky	Symphony No. 1 (1892)

== Notes ==
Sources

- Frisch, Walter (2003). Brahms: The Four Symphonies. New Haven: Yale University Press. pp. 7–10. ISBN 0-300-09965-7.
- Sonneck (1912). Orchestral Music (Class M1000-1268) Catalogue. Library of Congress, Music Division.
