= Symphony No. 32 (Michael Haydn) =

Portrait of Michael Haydn by Franz Xaver Hornöck

Michael Haydn's Symphony No. 32 in D major, Perger 23, Sherman 32, MH 420, was written in Salzburg in 1786. Scored for flute, two oboes, two bassoons, two horns, two trumpets, timpani, and strings, it is Haydn's only symphony in two movements; this it has in common with Carl Nielsen's Symphony No. 5 but not much else (Delarte, 2006).

It is in two movements:

1. Vivace assai
2. Rondeau

The first movement, in 3/8, begins softly with a somewhat dancelike theme.

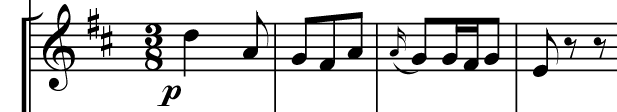

At measure 20, a new theme is introduced forte with a more pronounced dance character. After the establishment of A major, the second subject group begins at measure 41:

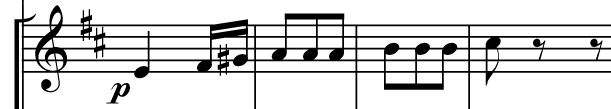

This leads to a much more lyrical theme at measure 55. After a typical unison scale run, the exposition concludes with A major firmly established as the tonic. The development is concerned almost exclusively with Example 2. A general pause precedes the recapitulation, which besides reorienting the second subject group to D major, also mixes the subjects of the groups together, with special emphasis on Example 2. Haydn indicated the development, recapitulation and coda are to be repeated as a unit, but that repeat is normally ignored in modern performance.

For the slow movement, the second oboist switches to flute.

The concluding Rondo's principal theme

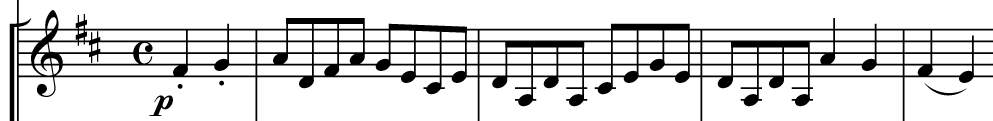

is triadic to an extent not encountered in the previous movement, while the contrasting themes tend to be stepwise.

== Discography ==
On the CPO label, this symphony is available on a CD that also includes Symphonies Nos. 21, 30 and 31; Johannes Goritzki conducting the Deutsche Kammerakademie Neuss. The exposition repeat in the first movement is obeyed, the repeat of the development and recapitulation is ignored.
