= Symphony No. 31 (Michael Haydn) =

Michael Haydn's Symphony No. 31 in F major, Perger 22, Sherman 31, MH 405, was written in Salzburg in 1785. Scored for two oboes, two English horns, two bassoons, two horns, and strings, the symphony in three movements:

1. Allegro assai
2. Andante cantabile, in B♭ major
3. Presto

== Discography ==
On the CPO label, this symphony is available on a CD that also includes Symphonies Nos. 21, 30 and 32; Johannes Goritzki conducting the Deutsche Kammerakademie Neuss.
