= St. Francis Mass =

- by Michael Haydn
- The composer
- Native name: Missa sub titulo Sancti Francisci Seraphici
- Catalogue: Klafsky I:23; MH 826
- Occasion: name day
- Text: Mass ordinary
- Language: Latin
- Composed: 1803
- Movements: 6
- Vocal: SATB choir and soloists
- Instrumental: orchestra

The St. Francis Mass is the shorter name for the Missa sub titulo Sancti Francisci Seraphici (Klafsky I:23, MH 826) composed by Michael Haydn. He completed it on 16 August 1803, apparently at the request of Empress Maria Theresa for a name day celebration.

The score calls for a quartet of vocal soloists, mixed choir, 2 oboes, bassoon, 2 horns, 2 trumpets, timpani, and strings with an organ to play basso continuo.

1. "Kyrie" Adagio, D minor, 3/4
  —"Christe eleison" Allegro con brio
  —"Kyrie eleison" D major
  —"Kyrie eleison" Adagio, D minor
2. "Gloria" Vivace molto, D major, common time
  —"Domine Deus, rex coelestis..." Andante, G major, 3/8
  —"Qui tollis..." D major
  —"Suscipe..." A minor
  —"Miserere..." B minor
  —"Quoniam..." Vivace molto, D major, common time
3. "Credo" Allegro, D major, 3/8
  —"Et incarnatus est..." Largo, F major, common time
  —"Et resurrexit..." Allegro con spirito, D major, 3/4
4. "Sanctus" Andante maestoso, D major, cut time
5. "Benedictus" Allegretto moderato, D major, cut time
6. "Agnus Dei" Adagio molto, B minor, 3/4
  —"Dona nobis pacem..." Allegro, D major

Many composers have prolonged the setting of the word passus in the Credo through the use of techniques such as melisma, syncopation, and suspension. In this mass, however, Haydn prolongs the word simply by using two "longer note values than have occurred earlier in the setting".

The mass was published in 1917 as Volume 45 of the Denkmäler der Tonkunst in Österreich, edited by Anton Maria Klafsky.

Unlike the Requiem in C minor, which was still in church use in Austria in the 20th century, the St. Francis Mass disappeared from the repertoire at some point in the 19th century.

== Sources ==
- Heartz, Daniel, 1995. New York. Haydn, Mozart, and the Viennese School: 1740 — 1780 W. W. Norton & Co.
- Sherman, Charles, 1969. Mainz Foreword to Missa pro Defunctis, Universal Edition
- Sherman, Charles, 1980. Madison, Wisconsin Preface to Missa in Honorem Sanctae Ursulae, A-R Editions, Inc.
