= Sigismund von Schrattenbach =

Austrian Prince-Archbishop

His Grace Siegmund III. Christoph Graf von Schrattenbach
- Prince-Archbishop of Salzburg
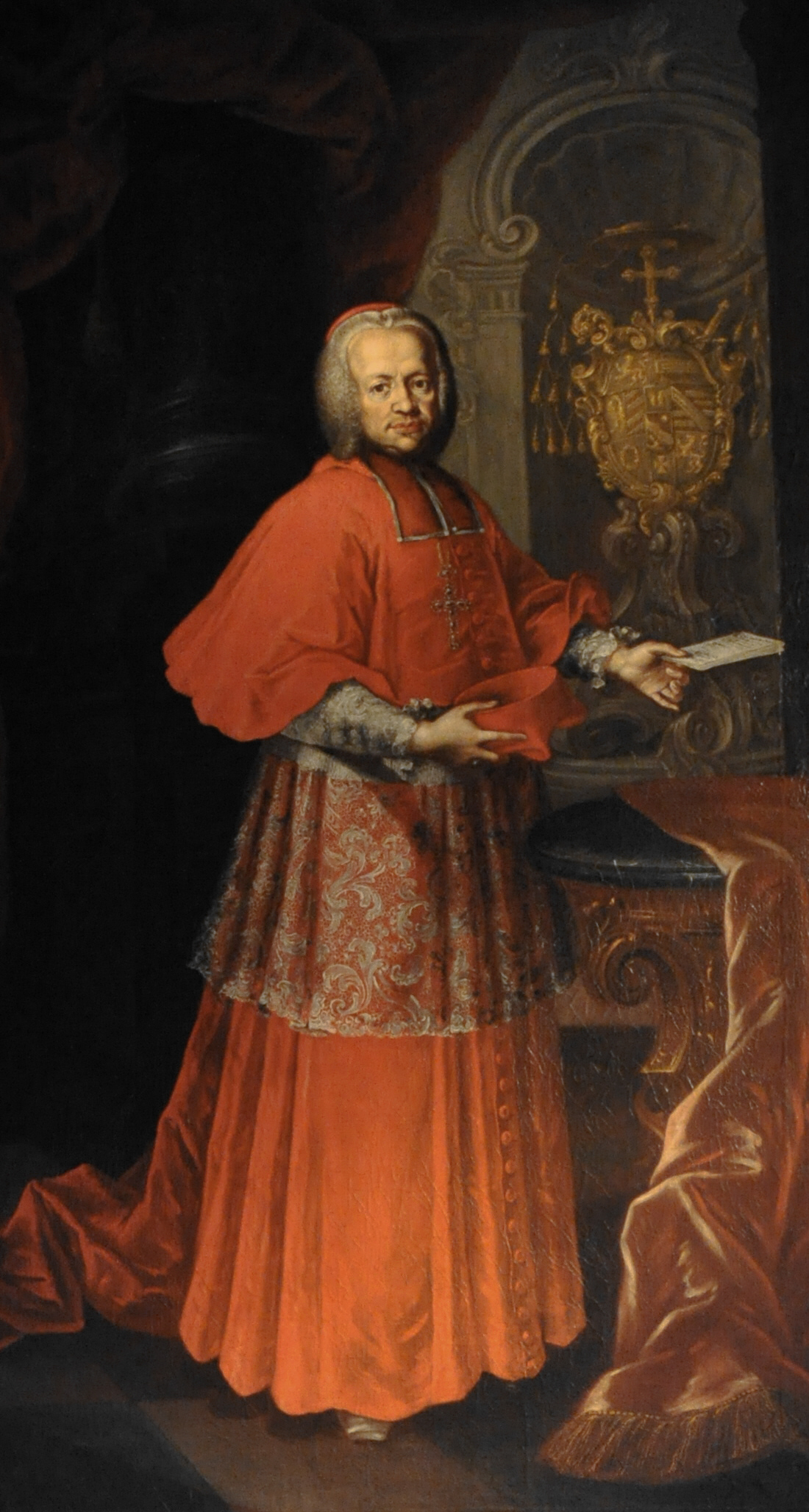
- Portrait by Franz Xaver König
- Church: Roman Catholic Church
- Archdiocese: Salzburg
- See: Cathedral of Saints Rupert and Vergilius
- Installed: 26 September 1753
- Term ended: 16 December 1771
- Predecessor: Andreas Jakob von Dietrichstein
- Successor: Hieronymus von Colloredo

Personal details
- Born: 28 February 1698 Graz, Styria, Holy Roman Empire
- Died: 16 December 1771 (aged 73) Salzburg, Archbishopric of Salzburg, Holy Roman Empire

Siegmund III Christoph Graf von Schrattenbach, also Sigismundus (28 February 1698 – 16 December 1771) was Prince-Archbishop of Salzburg from 1753 to 1771. Both the composers, Leopold and Wolfgang Mozart served under him.

== Life ==
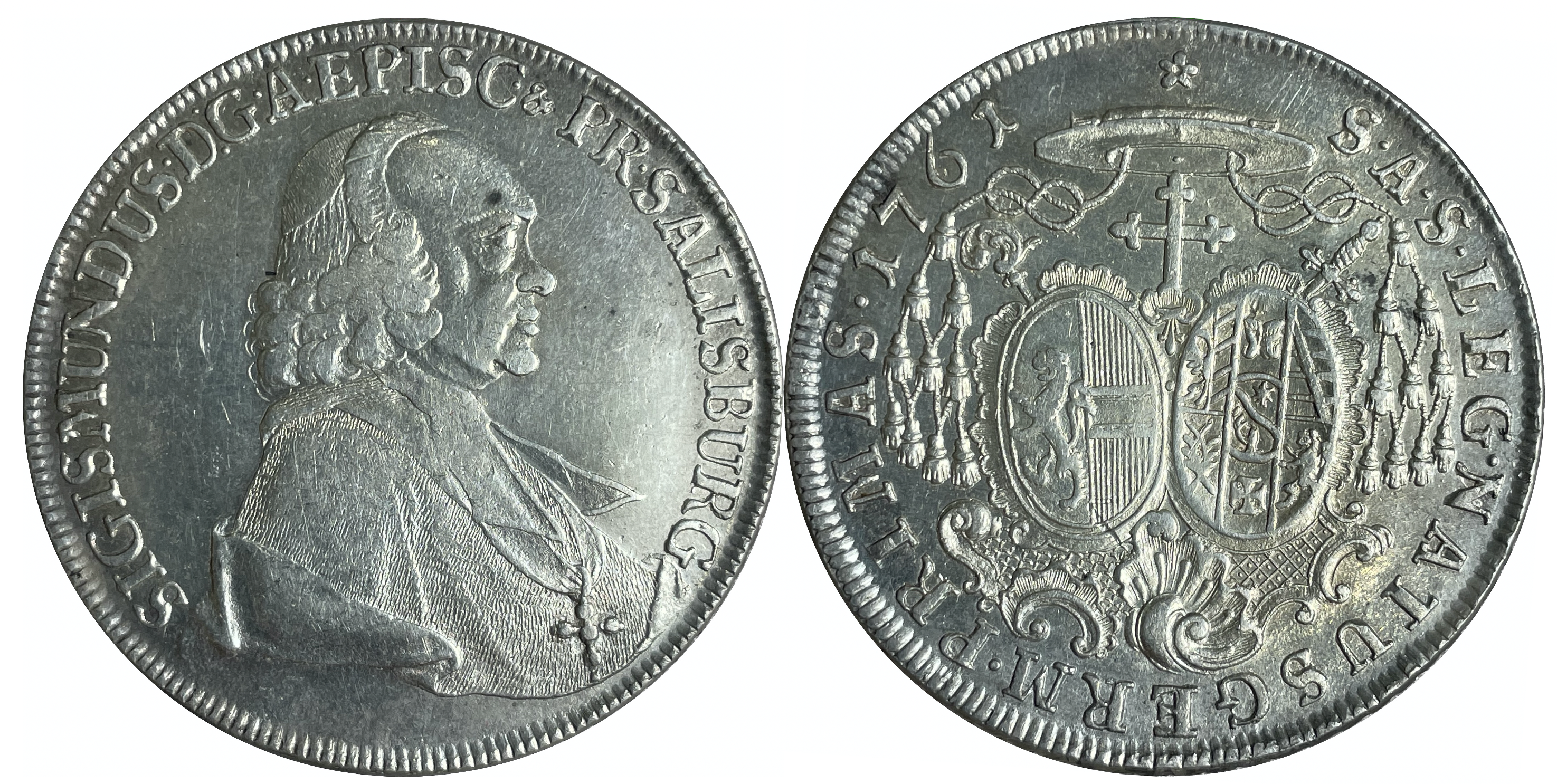
Silver coin: 1 thaler Salzburg, 1761

He was born in Graz, Styria, the son of Count Otto Heinrich von Schrattenbach and Maria Theresa, Countess of Wildenstein and widowed Baroness Gall von Gallenstein. After studying theology in Rome, Schrattenbach was ordained a priest in 1723 and obtained a seat in the Salzburg cathedral chapter in 1733. In 1747 he was appointed administrator of Hohenwerfen Castle, later also cathedral dean and privy councillor.

He was elected Archbishop of Salzburg after the death of Count Andreas Jakob von Dietrichstein in 1753, after numerous rounds of voting he finally prevailed against rivalling Joseph Maria von Thun, Bishop of Gurk. During his tenure Leopold Mozart as well as his son Wolfgang Amadeus were appointed members of the episcopal court orchestra and he financed the grand tour across Europe. In 1763 he employed Michael Haydn as court composer.

Between 1764 and 1767, Sigismund was responsible for the construction of the Sigmundstor, a road tunnel that connects the Salzburg Altstadt with the Riedenburg quarter through the Mönchsberg mountain. The tunnel now bears his name, although it is more commonly known by its earlier name of the Neutor.

Schrattenbach died in Salzburg, aged 73. His funeral service on 2 January 1772 was the occasion for the first performance of Michael Haydn's Requiem Missa pro defuncto Archiepiscopo Sigismondo written in his honour. Schrattenbach was succeeded by Count Hieronymus von Colloredo, the last Salzburg prince-archbishop before the 1803 secularisation. Michael Haydn stayed in Salzburg under the reign of Colloredo; Wolfgang Amadeus Mozart, on the other hand, left soon after.

== Notes ==
Religious titles
Preceded by Andreas Jakob von Dietrichstein	Archbishop of Salzburg; 1753-1771	Succeeded by Hieronymus von Colloredo
