= Philipp Sigmund of Dietrichstein =

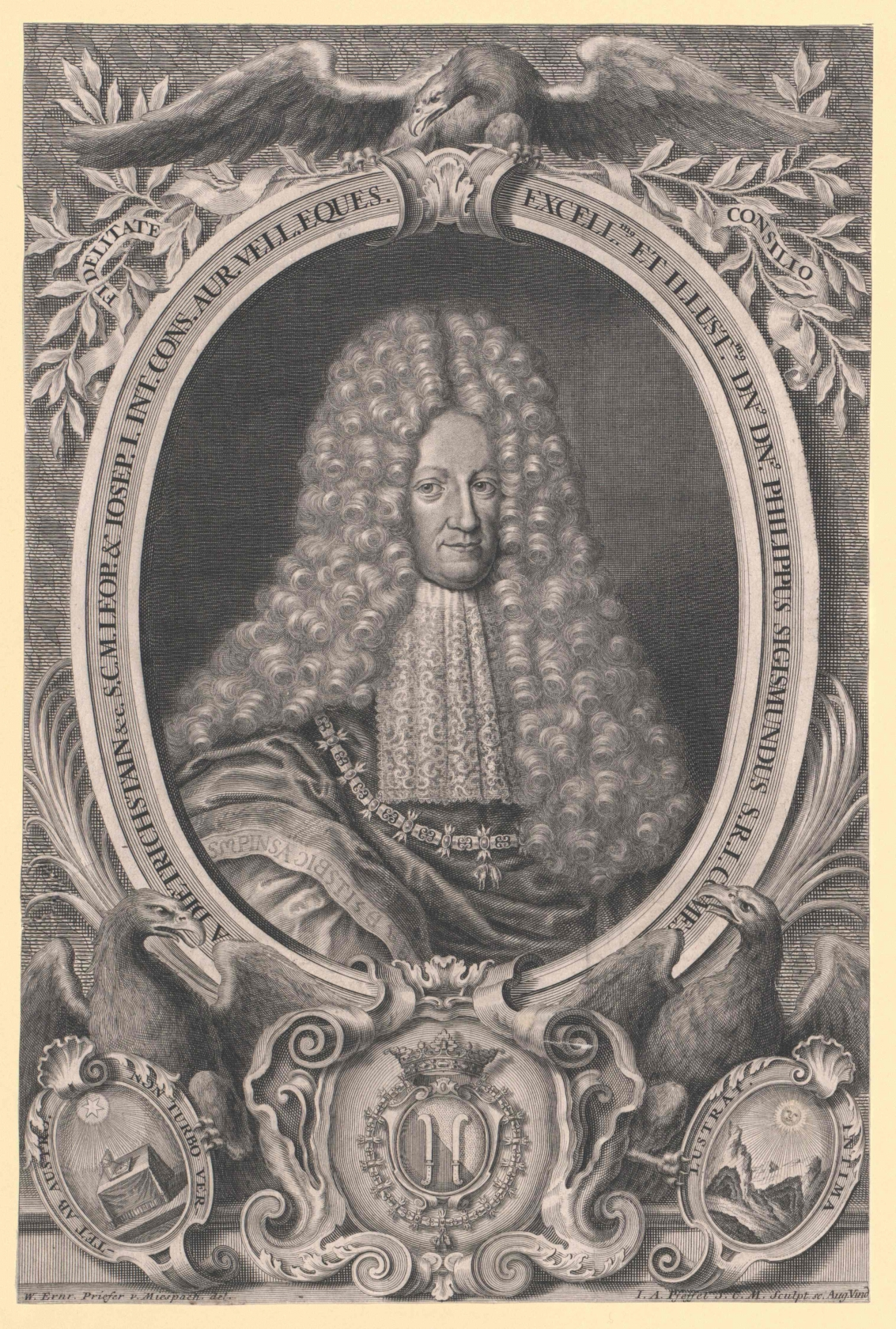
Philipp Sigmund of Dietrichstein

Philipp Sigmund of Dietrichstein (9 March 1651 – 3 July 1716), was a German prince member of the House of Dietrichstein.

== Early life and ancestry ==
He was the fourth child and third (but second surviving) son of Maximilian, 2nd Prince of Dietrichstein zu Nikolsburg, and his second wife, Countess Sophie Agnes of Mansfeld-Bornstädt (4 November 1619 – 20 January 1677), a daughter of Wolfgang III, Count of Mansfeld-Vorderort-Bornstädt.

== Marriage and issue ==
In 1680, Philipp Sigmund married firstly with Marie Elisabeth Hofmann, Baroness of Grünbühel-Strechau (1663 – 21 January 1705). They had three children:

- Maria Anna Franziska Eva (10 August 1681 – 1704), married on 25 April 1700 to Count Johann Wenzel of Gallas.
- Marie Ernestine (13 July 1683 – 30 January 1745), married firstly on 26 October 1716 to Count Johann Wenzel of Gallas (widower of her older sister) and secondly on 8 June 1721 to Count Aloys Thomas of Harrach-Rohrau-Thannhausen.
- Emanuel Joseph Johann (18 March 1690 – 27 October 1703).

After 1705, Philipp Sigmund married secondly with Dorothea Josepha, Baroness Jankovský of Vlašim (1666 – 31 May 1742). They had no children.

== Death ==
Philipp Sigmund of Dietrichstein died on 3 July 1716, aged 65.

== See also ==
- Palais Lobkowitz, Vienna
