= Szeged Symphony Orchestra =

Hungarian symphony orchestra based in Szeged

The Szeged Symphony Orchestra (Hungarian: Szegedi Szimfonikus Zenekar), also known as the Hungarian National Symphony Orchestra Szeged, is a professional symphony orchestra based in Szeged, Hungary. It is one of the principal musical institutions of the Southern Great Plain region and performs both symphonic concerts and opera productions in cooperation with the Szeged National Theatre.

== History ==
The orchestral tradition in Szeged dates back to the eighteenth century. In the modern sense, the city's symphonic ensemble developed from the end of the nineteenth century through several institutional forms and under different names. The Orchestra of the Szeged Philharmonic Association was founded in 1919 under the leadership of Sándor Figedy-Fichtner. Between 1934 and 1944 the ensemble was led by the young Ferenc Fricsay, whose international career later made him one of the most prominent Hungarian conductors of the twentieth century.

During Fricsay's Szeged years, the orchestra was also conducted by notable guest conductors including Willem Mengelberg, Erich Kleiber and Pietro Mascagni, who conducted a performance of his own opera. After the Second World War the orchestra continued to function within Szeged's musical and theatrical life. The political decision to dissolve the Szeged opera company in 1949 was followed by a period of reorganisation, and in 1955 the revived Szeged Philharmonic Orchestra took the name Bartók Béla Symphony Orchestra.

The Szeged Symphony Orchestra in its present institutional form was founded in 1969 by the conductor and composer Viktor Vaszy, who sought to create stronger conditions for symphonic concert life alongside the city's opera productions. Since then the orchestra has been central to Szeged's concert life and to the opera work of the Szeged National Theatre.

In the decades after Vaszy, the ensemble was shaped by chief conductors including Tamás Pál, Géza Oberfrank and Ervin Acél. The new organisational framework established in 1969 allowed the ensemble to develop as an important concert orchestra as well as an opera orchestra. Sándor Gyüdi became director-conductor in 1999 and later served as principal conductor and music director. In 2018 he was elected director of the Szeged Symphony Orchestra by the city assembly, succeeding Győző Lukácsházi.

Since 2012 the orchestra has used the title Hungarian National Symphony Orchestra Szeged.

== Concert and opera activity ==
The orchestra performs in Szeged's concert halls and theatres and is closely connected with the operatic life of the city. It has participated in productions at the Szeged National Theatre and in large-scale open-air events, including performances associated with the Szeged Open-Air Festival. The orchestra has also given public and festival concerts in the city's Dóm Square, including the traditional gift concerts organised with the Szeged Open-Air Festival.

The ensemble has taken part in commemorative and civic events in Szeged. In 2012 it performed a Szent-Györgyi memorial concert at the Szeged National Theatre, marking the anniversary of Albert Szent-Györgyi's Nobel Prize and recalling a 1937 concert given by the orchestra's predecessor in his honour. It has also appeared at the St. Gellért International Classical Music Festival, an event connected with the cultural and ecclesiastical life of Szeged and the wider region.

== Tours and recordings ==
The orchestra has toured in Europe, Taiwan, Singapore, China and Brazil, and has appeared at international venues and festivals. Its touring activity has included concerts in Spain; in 2011–2012 the orchestra gave Strauss gala concerts in Barcelona's L'Auditori under the Austrian conductor Norbert Pfafflmayer, with soprano Cornelia Hübsch.

The orchestra has recorded for labels including Hungaroton. Its documented discography includes Liszt Hungarian Rhapsodies and other recordings for Hungaroton, as well as releases of concert arias and opera arias listed by the Budapest Music Center. Other recordings associated with the orchestra include Dvořák violin and cello concertos, Kabalevsky symphonies, Liszt piano concertos, Dohnányi, Mozart piano concertos and works by Ravel, Roussel, Ives, Debussy and Bartók.

== Guest conductors and collaborators ==
Guest conductors who have worked with the orchestra have included Karl Richter, Alexander Frey, Lamberto Gardelli, Carlo Zecchi, Roberto Benzi, Libor Pešek, Zoltán Kocsis, Tamás Vásáry, Günter Neuhold, János Ferencsik, Willem Mengelberg, Erich Kleiber, Pietro Mascagni, Vasily Petrenko, Thomas Sanderling, Hermann Bäumer, Ewa Strusińska, Constantine Orbelian, Kirill Karabits, Alevtina Ioffe, Heiko Mathias Förster, Adam Stadnicki and Nayden Todorov.

The orchestra's associated artists and collaborators also include Sándor Gyüdi, Viktor Vaszy, Ferenc Fricsay, Tamás Pál, Géza Oberfrank, Ervin Acél, Sándor Szabolcs, Norbert Pfafflmayer, Cornelia Hübsch, Tamás Cselóczki, Csaba Szegedi, Krisztián Cser, Victoria Markaryan and Philippe Brocard.

== International Ferenc Fricsay Conducting Competition ==
The orchestra is associated with the International Ferenc Fricsay Conducting Competition (IFFCC), held in Szeged and named after Ferenc Fricsay, who led the Szeged orchestra for a decade before his international career. The competition is presented as an international platform for conductors and offers guest-conducting engagements with European orchestras. The live rounds are held in Szeged with the participation of the Hungarian National Symphony Orchestra Szeged.

The first edition took place from 3 to 10 September 2023. It attracted more than 500 applicants from 61 countries, from whom 111 conductors were invited to appear in Szeged. The jury president of the first edition was Vasily Petrenko. The jury did not award a first prize. The second prize, the highest prize awarded, went to Sebastiaan van Yperen; the third prize went to Noris Borgogelli. Gabriel Hollander received the special prize of the Szeged Symphony Orchestra, and Jorge Vázquez received a special engagement with the Bakersfield Symphony Orchestra.

The second edition was held from 31 August to 7 September 2025. Its jury was chaired by Nayden Todorov. According to the competition's results, Misha Shekhtman won first prize, Hyunsik Shin won second prize, and third prize was shared by Nicolò Azzena and Vivian Ip.

== Principal conductors ==
- 1945–1947 Árpád Lehotay
- 1947–1949 Béla Both
- 1957–1969 Viktor Vaszy
- 1969–1971 Ferenc Lendvay
- 1975–1983 Tamás Pál
- 1983–1989 Géza Oberfrank
- 1989–1991 Tamás Pál
- 1991–1999 Ervin Acél
- 2008–2018 Sándor Gyüdi
- 2018–present Sándor Gyüdi

== Managing directors ==
- 2008–2013 Gábor Baross
- 2013–2018 Győző Lukácsházi
- 2018–present Sándor Gyüdi

== Music directors ==
- 1999–2004 Ervin Lukács
- 2004–2007 János Fürst
- 2008–present Sándor Gyüdi
