= Maximilian, Prince of Dietrichstein =

Maximilian
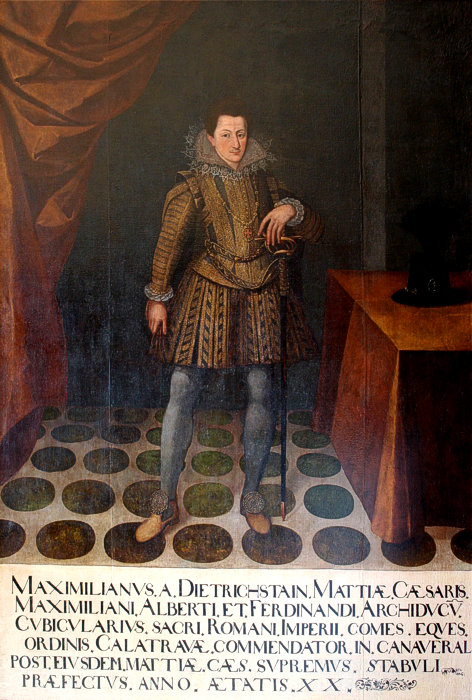
- Portrait of Maximilian, Prince of Dietrichstein in 1655

Prince of Dietrichstein
- Reign: 8 November 1629 - 6 November 1655
- Predecessor: Franz Seraph of Dietrichstein
- Successor: Ferdinand Joseph, Prince of Dietrichstein
- Born: 27 June 1596; Vienna
- Died: 6 November 1655 (aged 59)
- Spouse: Anna Maria of Liechtenstein (m. 1618; died 1640) Countess Sophie Agnes of Mansfeld-Bornstädt (m. 1640; died 1655)
- Issue: Marie Eleonore of Dietrichstein; Johanna Beatrix of Dietrichstein; Maria Klara of Dietrichstein; Ferdinand Joseph, Prince of Dietrichstein; Maria Margareta of Dietrichstein; Maximilian Andreas of Dietrichstein; Philipp Sigmund of Dietrichstein; Maria Sophia of Dietrichstein
- House: House of Dietrichstein
- Father: Sigismund II, Count of Dietrichstein
- Mother: Johanna von der Leiter, Baroness zu Behrn und Vicenz

Maximilian, Prince of Dietrichstein (27 June 1596 – 6 November 1655), was a German prince member of the House of Dietrichstein, Imperial Count (Reichsgraf) of Dietrichstein and owner of the Lordship of Nikolsburg in Moravia; since 1629 2nd Prince (Fürst) of Dietrichstein zu Nikolsburg, Baron (Freiherr) of Hollenburg, Finkenstein and Thalberg, was a diplomat and minister in the service of the House of Habsburg. He was a Kämmerer, Lord Chamberlain (Obersthofmeister), Conference Minister (Konferenzminister) and Privy Councillor of Emperors Ferdinand II and Ferdinand III, Knight of the Order of the Golden Fleece since and ruler over Nikolsburg (now Mikulov), Polná, Kanitz (now Dolní Kounice), Leipnik (now Lipník nad Bečvou), Weisskirch and Saar (now Žďár nad Sázavou).

== Early life ==
Born in Vienna, he was the second, but eldest surviving son of Sigismund II, Count of Dietrichstein, Baron of Hollenburg, Finkenstein and Thalberg (1561-1602), by his second wife, Johanna von der Leiter (della Scala), Baroness (Freiin) von der Leytter zu Behrn und Vicenz (1574-1649), heiress of Amerang and member of the Scaliger family, former rulers of Verona.

== Career ==
Like all his ancestors, Maximilian was in the service of the House of Habsburg, but instead of following a military career he pursued a civilian one. In his youth he was at the service of Archduke Matthias of Austria and closely watched the growing disputes between him and his unpopular older brother, Emperor Rudolph II. Firstly, he was involved in the intrigues that ended with the coronation of Matthias as King of Hungary and Croatia in 1608. After this -and thanks to the help of Matthias' chancellor, Melchior Klesl, Bishop of Vienna and Cardinal since 1615-, Maximilian was able to secure the coronation of Matthias as King of Bohemia. Finally, in 1612 Matthias became Holy Roman Emperor; shortly after, the new Emperor rewarded Maximilian with the title of Imperial Count (Reichsgraf), by diploma dated 18 September 1612.

Even before the death of Emperor Matthias in 1619, Maximilian was under the service of Archduke of Ferdinand II of Inner Austria; he supported Ferdinand II's senior adviser, Baron (and later Prince) Hans Ulrich von Eggenberg in his efforts to secure the election of Ferdinand II as Matthias' successor. Important steps were the cession of the Kingdom of Bohemia to Ferdinand II in 1617, and his election as King of Hungary and Croatia on 16 May 1618. A few days later (23 May) took place the Defenestration of Prague, where (primarily thanks to the intervention of his uncle, Cardinal Franz Seraph of Dietrichstein, Prince-Bishop and Duke of Olomouc), Maximilian managed to avoid the involvement of his Moravian estates in the following uprising. Finally, after further negotiations, Ferdinand II was unanimously elected as Holy Roman Emperor on 28 August 1619. Ten years later, on 7 August 1629, Maximilian received, according to the law of primogeniture, the title of Imperial Count Palatine (Kaiserliche Hofpfalzgraf) with unlimited territorial competence.

In 1634, Maximilian was made a Knight of the Order of the Golden Fleece, being the 388 Knight since his foundation.

After the death of Emperor Ferdinand II in 1637, Maximilian served his son and successor, Emperor Ferdinand III, and until his death in 1655 he held the offices of Kämmerer, Lord Chamberlain (Obersthofmeister), Conference Minister (Konferenzminister) and Privy Councillor.

In 1638 Maximilian left 146,000 florins extracted from his domain of Saar to the Cistercian Order. He also sold Steinabrunn in 1630 to the Bishopric of Slezské Rudoltice and Georg Maximilian of Hoditz by 15,000 thalers. In 1643 he placed at Nikolsburg Castle 2,000 barrels of sive wine.

=== Princely title ===
His uncle Franz Seraph of Dietrichstein, since 1599 Cardinal and since 1600 Prince-Bishop and Duke of Olomouc, received on 16 March 1624 the title of Imperial Prince (Reichfürst), being the first member of his family who received this hereditary title. Along with his investiture, Franz Seraph obtained the right to pass title to his bloodline, in particular Maximilian, his only surviving nephew. The Cardinal of Dietrichstein then instituted him as his sole heir and successor in the princely dignity. However, Maximilian didn't want to wait the death of his uncle, and received from Emperor Ferdinand II (as a special grace) on 8 November 1629 an extension of the previously awarded title, which enabled Maximilian to be raised himself as the second Prince of Dietrichstein.

The confirmation of the princely title for him and his legitimate male descendants in strict primogeniture was confirmed on 24 March 1631. Thanks to the special intercession of Emperor Ferdinand III, Maximilian received a seat and vote in the Reichstag at Regensburg, with the condition of the acquisition of a direct imperial territory. Despite the resistance of the other German princes, on 28 February 1654, Maximilian received the seat and vote in the Imperial princely college, at the same time that the Princes of Salm, Auersperg and Piccolomini; however, due to the lack of compliance with the requirement previously solicited, the princes protested on the Imperial Diet, so Maximilian was virtually excluded from a direct participation.

Thanks to the Fideikommiss granted by his uncle Franz Seraph, Maximilian was able to purchase the Lordships of Kanitz, Wostitz (Vlasatice), Saar (Žďár nad Sázavou) and Steinabrunn (in the district of Korneuburg in Lower Austria), where he instituted the primogeniture. This contributed significantly to the increase of the family fortune.

== Personal life ==
On 23 April 1618 in Lednice, Maximilian married to Princess Anna Maria of Liechtenstein (1597–1640), a daughter of Karl I, Prince of Liechtenstein and Duke of Troppau and Jägerndorf. Before her death on 26 April 1640, they were the parnets of thirteen children:

- Marianna Cäcilia (1619–1619), who died in infancy.
- Anna Franziska (1621–1685), who married Imperial Field Marshal and Count Walter Leslie in 1647.
- Franz Anton (1622–1622), who died in infancy.
- Marie Eleonore (1623–1687), who married firstly on 26 November 1646 to Count Leo Wilhelm von Kaunitz and secondly on 15 April 1663 to Count Frederick Leopold of Oppersdorff.
- Johanna Beatrix (1625–1676), who married Karl Eusebius, Prince of Liechtenstein in 1644.
- Maria Klara (1626–1667), who married Count Johann Frederick of Trauttmansdorff, Baron of Gleichenberg, in 1650.
- A daughter (1630–1630), who died in infancy.
- A son (1634–1634), who died in infancy.
- Ferdinand Joseph (1636–1698), who married Princess Marie Elisabeth of Eggenberg, eldest child and only surviving daughter of Johann Anton I, Prince of Eggenberg, and Margravine Anna Maria of Brandenburg-Bayreuth, in 1656.
- Maria Margareta Josefa (1637–1676), who married Prince Raimondo Montecuccoli, Duke of Melfi in 1657.
- Maximilian Andreas (1638–1692), who married Baroness Maria Justina of Schwarzenberg in 1663.
- Maria Theresia (1639–1658), who married Karl Adam, Count of Mansfeld-Vorderort-Bornstädt, the brother of her stepmother, in 1654.
- Karl (1639–1639), who died in infancy.

On 4 December 1640, Maximilian married secondly with Countess Sophie Agnes of Mansfeld-Bornstädt (1619–1677), a daughter of Wolfgang III, Count of Mansfeld-Vorderort-Bornstädt. They had six children:

- Maria Josepha (1641–1676).
- Franz Anton (1643–1721), who became a Jesuit.
- Joseph Ignaz (b. 1644/50), who died soon after birth.
- Philipp Sigmund (1651–1716), who married Baroness Marie Elisabeth Hofmann of Grünbühel-Strechau in 1680. After her death, he married Baroness Dorothea Josepha Jankovský z Vlašimi after 1705.
- Maria Rosina Sophia (1652–1711), who married Count Franz Eusebius of Pötting in 1662. After his death, she married Count Wenzel Ferdinand of Lobkowicz in 1681.
- Maria Charlotte Anna Sophia Theresia Rosa Eustachia (1655–1682).

The Prince died on 6 November 1655. Upon his death, he was succeeded as 3rd Prince of Dietrichstein by his eldest surviving son, Ferdinand Joseph.

== Ancestry ==
Ancestors of Maximilian, Prince of Dietrichstein

16. Pankraz of Dietrichstein
8. Siegmund of Dietrichstein
17. Barbara Thurn-Gössl von Mühlbach
4. Adam of Dietrichstein
18. Maximilian I, Holy Roman Emperor
9. Barbara von Rottal
19. Margareta von Edelsheim
2. Sigismund II, Count of Dietrichstein
20. Joan Ramón IV Folch de Cardona
10. Antoni de Cardona i Enríquez
21. Aldonza Enríquez de Quiñones
5. Margarita Folch de Cardona y Requesens
22. Galcerán de Requesens y Joan de Soler
11. Ana María Requesens de Soler y Enríquez de Velasco
23. Beatriz Enríquez de Velasco
1. Maximilian, 2nd Prince of Dietrichstein
24. Johann II von der Leiter
12. Hans Christoph I von der Leiter
25. Margareta von Laiming
6. Hans Warmund von der Leiter
26. Count Wolfgang of Hohenzollern-Haigerloch
13. Elisabeth of Hohenzollern-Haigerloch
27. Magravine Rosine of Baden
3. Johanna von der Leiter
28. Siegmund of Thurn
14. Jakob of Thurn
29. Apollonia of Maxlrain
7. Baroness Elisabeth of Thurn
30. Franz of Thannhausen
15. Barbara of Thannhausen
31. Regina Katharina of Firmian
