= Marie Eleonore of Dietrichstein =

German noblewoman

Countess Marie Eleonore of Dietrichstein (1 January 1623 – 20 March 1687), was a German noblewoman, by birth member of the House of Dietrichstein and by her two marriages Countess of Kaunitz and Oppersdorf.

== Early life ==
Born in Vienna, she was the fourth child and third (but second surviving) daughter of Maximilian, 2nd Prince of Dietrichstein zu Nikolsburg, and his first wife Princess Anna Maria Franziska of Liechtenstein (1597-1640), elder daughter of Karl I, Prince of Liechtenstein, Duke of Troppau and Jägerndorf.

== Biography ==
In Vienna on 26 November 1646 Marie Eleonore married firstly with Lev Vilém (Leopold Wilhelm; 16 January 1614 – 31 October 1655), a Bohemian Count since 12 June 1642 and son of Oldřich (Ulrich) V of Kaunitz and his second wife Ludmilla Raupowsky of Raupow. They had one son:

- Dominik Andreas I (30 November 1654 – 11 January 1705), Count of Kaunitz; married on 25 November 1675 to Countess Maria Eleonore of Sternberg. They had eight children; one of his descendants, Countess Maria Eleonora of Kaunitz-Rietberg, became in the first wife of a noted Austrian Councillor, Prince Klemens von Metternich.

In Hodonín on 15 April 1663 Marie Eleonore married secondly with Count Frederick Leopold of Oppersdorff (d. 22 January 1699). They had no children.

Marie Eleonore died in Brno aged 64.
