= Symphony No. 27 (Michael Haydn) =

Michael Haydn's Symphony No. 27 in B♭ major, Opus 1 No. 1, Perger 18, Sherman 27, MH 358, written in Salzburg in 1784, is the first of the B♭ major symphonies attributed to Joseph Haydn in Hoboken's catalog. The symphony is scored for two oboes, two bassoons, two horns, and strings. It is in three movements:

1. Grave – Allegro con spirito
2. Andante, in E♭ major
3. Presto

This symphony is the third of four by Michael Haydn to include a slow introduction before the first movement (the others are Symphonies Nos. 21, 22, and 30). All four were written between 1778 and 1785 and attached to symphonies cast in three movements (without minuets).

== Discography ==
Included in a set of 20 symphonies on the CPO label with Bohdan Warchal conducting the Slovak Philharmonic; specifically, on disc 6 together with one of the other two Opus 1 symphonies. The BIS CD of the Helsinborg Symphony Orchestra conducted by Hans-Peter Frank instead pairs this symphony with Nos. 39, 34 and 30.
