= Maria Sophia of Dietrichstein =

German noblewoman

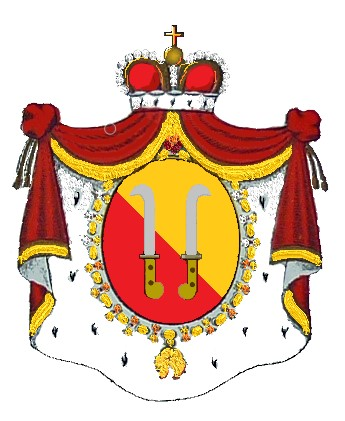
Dietrichstein Coat of Arms

Maria Sophia of Dietrichstein (Maria Rosina Sophia; 11 July 1646 – 4 November 1711), was a German noblewoman by birth, member of the House of Dietrichstein, and by her two marriages Countess of Pötting auf Ober-Falkenstein and Lobkowicz.

She was the fifth child and second daughter of Maximilian, 2nd Prince of Dietrichstein zu Nikolsburg, and his second wife Sophie Agnes, a daughter of Wolfgang III, Count of Mansfeld-Vorderort-Bornstädt.

== Life ==
On April 16, 1662 Maria Sophia married Franz Eusebius, Count of Pötting auf Ober-Falkenstein (d. 1678). They had three children, all of them born in Madrid, who died in infancy: María Inés, Francisca Eusebia and Maximiliano Adán. As the count's wife, she served as Imperial Ambassadress in Madrid from 1664 to 1674.

On 12 June 1681, Maria Sophia remarried, this time to Count Václav Ferdinand Popel of Lobkowicz (22 December 1654 – 8 October 1697). Her second husband was also appointed Ambassador of the Emperor to Madrid, and thus Sophia returned to Spain once again in the capacity of ambassadress (1689-1691). They had five children:

- Leopold Josef (17 January 1683 – 19 May 1707).
- Terezie Ludmila (23 January 1684 – 7 August 1684).
- Eleonore Katharina Charlotte (1 April 1685 – 3 March 1712), married on 17 October 1703 to Filip Hyacint Josef, Prince of Lobkowicz.
- Ludvík Filip (12 August 1687 – 27 December 1687).
- Ferdinand (born and died 28 May 1689).

Maria Sophia died aged 65. She was buried in Loreta, Prague.
