= Maximilian Andreas of Dietrichstein =

German prince

Maximilian Andreas of Dietrichstein (14 April 1638 – 4 December 1692), was a was an Austrian prince born in Moravia, member of the House of Dietrichstein.

He was the eleventh child and fourth (but third surviving) son of Maximilian, 2nd Prince of Dietrichstein zu Nikolsburg, and his first wife Anna Maria, a daughter of Karl I, Prince of Liechtenstein and Duke of Troppau and Jägerndorf.

== Life ==
The institution of primogeniture in the House of Dietrichstein forbade Maximilian Andreas to inherit a substantial part of the family heritage. On 18 January 1663, he married with Maria Justina (20 February 1647 – 21 April 1696), a daughter of Edmund III of Schwarzenberg, Seigneur de Bierset, d'Hierges, de Champlon and Countess Marie d'Arschot de Riviere. They had twelve children, of whom five survived to adulthood:

- Theresia Anna (2 February 1668 – c. 1668)
- Adrian Karl (31 August 1670 – 1722?)
- A daughter (born and died c. July 1671)
- Helene Regina (18 August 1672 – 13 March 1674)
- Eleonore Barbara (12 June 1674 – February 1679)
- Michael Frederick (15 October 1676 – 3 September 1678).
- Aemilian Balthasar Johann Lorenz (8 August 1678 – 15 June 1756), married in to 1719 Baroness Johanna Barbara of Regal. No issue.
- Julian Wilhelm (23 May 1680 – 5 March 1713/15)
- Ambrosius Ferdinand Franz Xaver (7 December 1682 – 1734), jesuit, Canon in Olomouc
- Innocenz Simbertus (13 October 1684 – k.a. 7 February 1707)
- Johann Moritz Felix (born and died 24 October 1685)
- Andreas Jakob (27 May 1689 – 5 January 1753), Archbishop of Salzburg (10 September 1747)

Having settled in Prague shortly after his marriage, Maximilian Andreas died there aged 54.
