= Maria Margareta of Dietrichstein =

German noblewoman

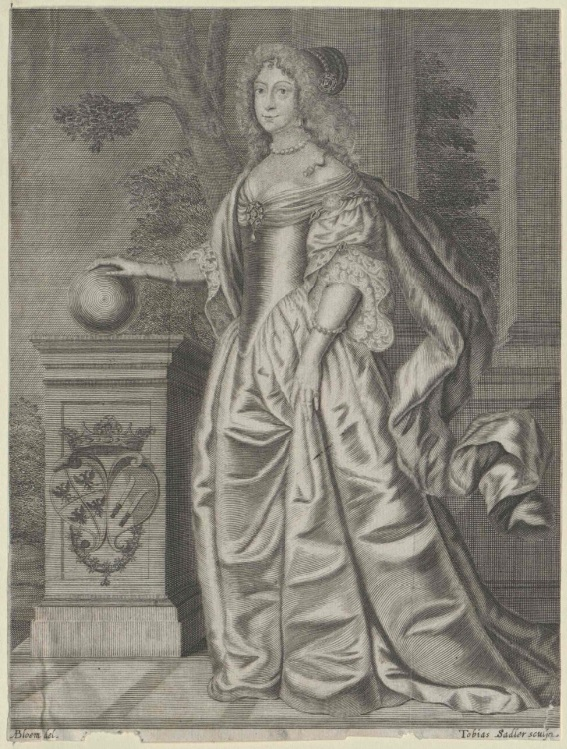
Portrait of Dietrichstein by Tobias Sadler

Maria Margareta of Dietrichstein (Maria Margareta Josefa; 18 April 1637 – 15 December 1676), was an Austrian noblewoman, born in Moravia, member of the House of Dietrichstein, and by marriage Princess Montecuccoli and Duchess of Melfi.

== Life ==
Maria Margareta was the daughter of Maximilian, 2nd Prince of Dietrichstein zu Nikolsburg, and Princess Anna Maria of Liechtenstein.

In 1657, Maria Margareta married Raimondo Montecuccoli, an Italian military commander who also served as General for the Habsburg Monarchy. For his services, he received the titles of Prince of the Holy Roman Empire and Neapolitan Duke of Melfi. They had four children:

- Anna Carola Catarina Polissena (1658/59 – ?), married to Johann Jakob Bartholomäus Khiesl, Count of Gottschee zu Ganowitz, Kaltenbrunn, Schrattenberg und Weyer.
- Aloysia Luigia Anna (1660/61 – ?), married to Franz Anton, Count Berka von Dub und Leipa.
- Leopoldo Filippo (1662 – 6 January 1698), Prince of the Holy Roman Empire and Duke of Melfi; married on 1679 to Countess Maria Josepha Antonia of Colloredo-Waldsee. No issue.
- Faustina Barbara (25 May 1663 – 6 May 1703), married firstly on 17 January 1678, to Michael Wenzel Ungnad, Count of Weissenwolff, secondly in February 1680 to Franz Christoph II of Khevenhüller-Frankenburg, and thirdly on 15 January 1688 to Wolfgang Andreas, Count of Orsini-Rosenberg.

== Death ==
Maria Margareta died in Vienna, aged 39.

== Sources ==
- Neuhaus, Helmut (1997). "Montecuccoli, Raimund Graf, Fürst (seit 1651), Herzog von Melfi (seit 1679)". Neue Deutsche Biographie 18 (in German). Archived from the original on July 16, 2026.
