= OP1 =

OP1 or OP-1 may refer to:

- Opus number 1
  - Op. 1 (disambiguation), a list of compositions that are assigned this number
- Bone morphogenetic protein 7 or BMP7, also known as osteogenic protein-1 or OP-1
- Pitcairn OP-1, a first rotary-wing aircraft
- Teenage Engineering OP-1, a portable synthesizer
- a clade in the Branching order of bacterial phyla (Rappe and Giovanoni, 2003)
- Rockchip RK3399, a Rockchip processor used in Chromebooks, marketed as OP1
- OP1 grade tea, see Tea leaf grading § Grades
- OP1, the highest possible Overall Position (OP) that high school graduates can receive in Queensland, Australia
