= Andreas Jakob von Dietrichstein =

Bohemian Prince-Archbishop

His Grace Andreas Jakob von Dietrichstein
- Prince-Archbishop of Salzburg
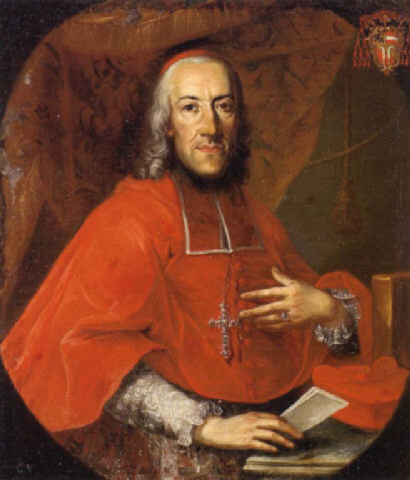
- Portrait by Josef Hauzinger
- Church: Roman Catholic Church
- Archdiocese: Salzburg
- See: Cathedral of Saints Rupert and Vergilius
- Installed: 5 May 1749
- Term ended: 5 January 1753
- Predecessor: Jakob Ernst von Liechtenstein-Kastelkorn
- Successor: Sigismund von Schrattenbach

Personal details
- Born: 27 May 1689 Moravia, Bohemia, Holy Roman Empire
- Died: 5 January 1753 (aged 63) Salzburg, Archbishopric of Salzburg, Holy Roman Empire
- Coat of arms

Andreas Jakob von Dietrichstein (27 May 1689, Moravia – 5 January 1753, Salzburg) was the Prince-Archbishop of Salzburg from 1747 to 1753. He was the successor to Prince-Archbishop Liechtenstein and ruled shortly before the birth of Wolfgang Amadeus Mozart.

== Biography ==
=== Early life ===
Andreas Jakob came from the Nikolsburger (Moravian) line of the House of Dietrichstein, whose origin can be traced back to Carinthia in what is now southern Austria. His father was Maximilian Andreas (1638-1692), Count of Dietrichstein and his mother Maria Justina (1647-1696) was the daughter of Edmund III, Count of Schwarzenberg.

=== Ecclesiastical career ===
He studied from 1707 in Salzburg, where he became a canon in 1713, cathedral dean in 1729, and cathedral provost in 1730.

On 10 September 1747, he was elected Archbishop of Salzburg. He was probably a compromise candidate for the canons, but the people clearly desired a Salzburg prince at the time, namely Dietrichstein. The episcopal consecration was performed on 1 June 1749 by Josef Maria Reichsgraf von Thun und Hohenstein, Bishop of Gurk.

He was an archbishop known for his austere appearance. Historical records note his interest in the cultural life of Salzburg, including his patronage of local festivals, masked balls, and the theatre.

Dietrichstein also suffered from the great financial difficulties of the archbishopric, which had been significantly aggravated by the previous Protestant expulsion. He was able to reduce the amount required by the Pope for his episcopal consecration and also achieved that this was paid by Maria Theresa of Austria.

In view of the financial difficulties, he campaigned on one hand for special frugality in his court and in the administration, with restrictions on court dress, and abandoning construction of large buildings, all the while promoting economic growth to the best of his ability.

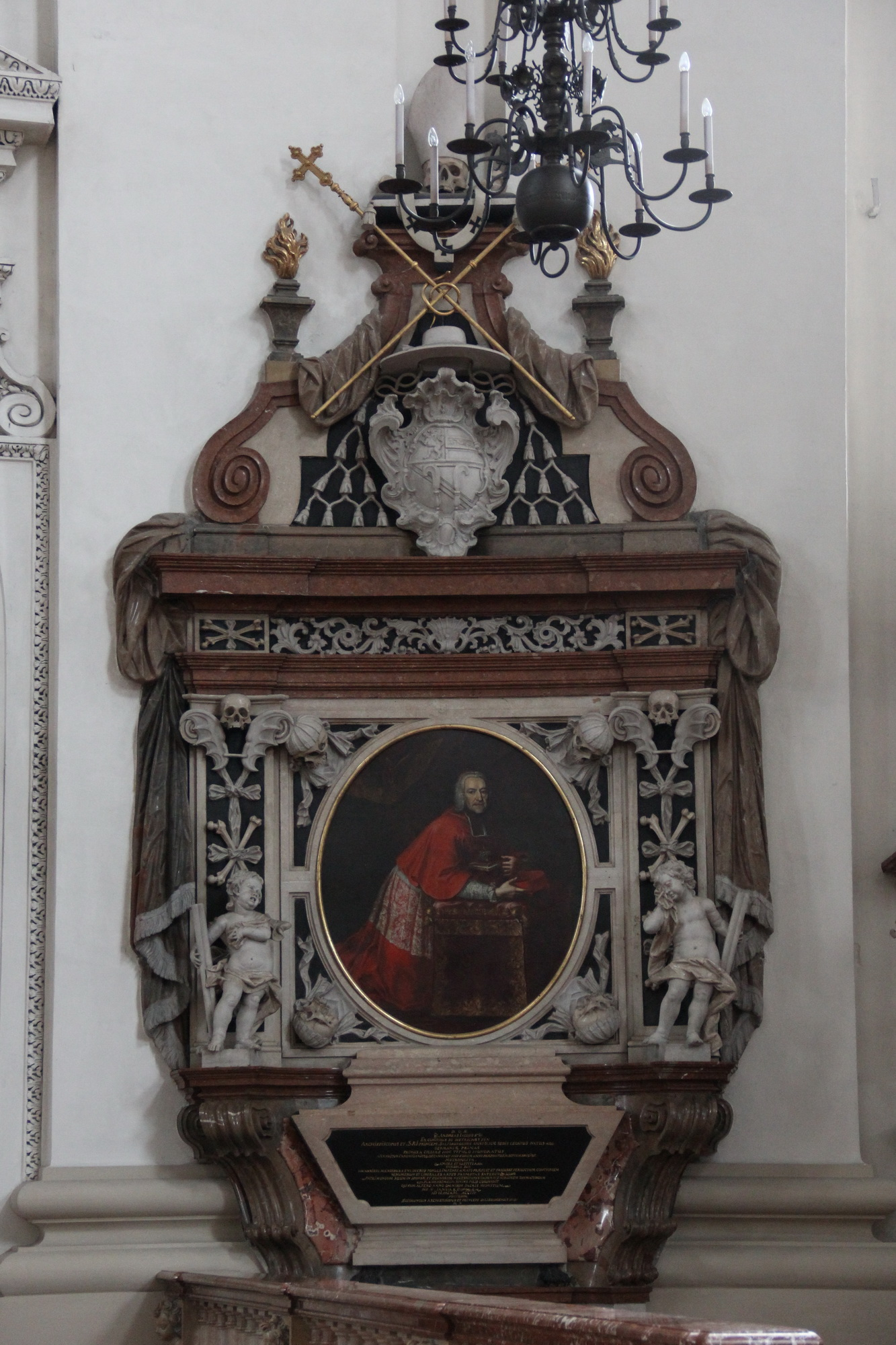
Grave monument of Archbishop Dietrichstein in Salzburg Cathedral.

The Wasserspiele in Hellbrunn were only poorly repaired. The "Mechanical Theater" of the Hellbrunner Wasserspiele was newly built. Lorenz Rosenegger committed 343 guilders to create 100 new figures and to initiate construction, which was met with several difficulties and a significant increase in costs. Dietrichstein also renovated the dilapidated Andreaskirche (Linzergasse).

Dietrichstein's personal motto was "amore et justitia" - "Through love and justice" - a principle to which he remained loyal for life as a just prince and friend of the people.

Dietrichstein died on 5 January 1753. Despite all the accentuated thrift, Dietrichstein left his successor in high debt.

Archbishop Dietrichstein was buried in the crypt of the Salzburg Cathedral.
