= Jan Václav of Gallas =

Bohemian diplomat (1669–1719)

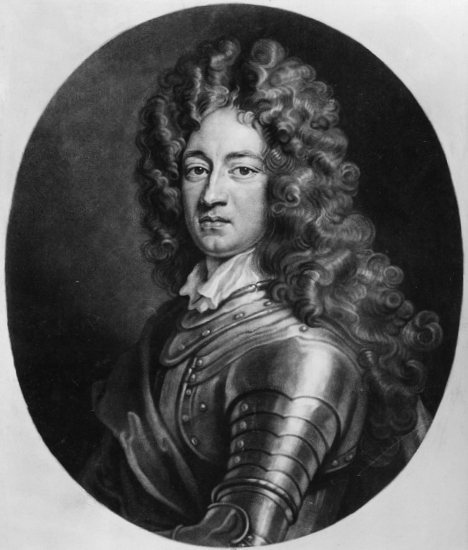
Jan Václav of Gallas (around 1707), after a painting by Godfrey Kneller

Count Jan Václav of Gallas (Czech: Jan Václav hrabě z Gallasu; German: Johann Wenzel Graf von Gallas; 23 May 1669 – 25 July 1719), Duke of Lucera, was a Bohemian noble and diplomat. He was one of the largest landowners in the Holy Roman Empire.

== Life ==
Jan Václav of Gallas was born on 23 May 1669 in Hořiněves. He was the eldest son of the Imperial general Count Franz Ferdinand of Gallas (1635–1697) and his second wife Johanna Emerentia Countess Gaschin of Rosenberg, and a grandson of Generalfeldmarschall Matthias Gallas, one of the leading Imperial commanders during the Thirty Years' War.

Gallas worked in the service of Emperors Joseph I and Charles VI, primarily as a diplomat. He successively became the Imperial ambassador in London (1705–1711), The Hague (1711–1713) and Rome (1713–1718). He carried out his diplomatic activities during the War of the Spanish Succession and was involved in negotiations with the English and Dutch allies and with the French Marquess of Torcy.

In 1709, he was awarded with the title and office of Stadtholder of the Habsburg Duchy of Limburg. In addition, he was the Emperor's real privy councilor, associate judge of the Czech regional court and above all from 1708 Marshal of the Kingdom of Bohemia. Emperor Charles VI, who claimed the Spanish throne, also awarded Gallas the rank of Grandee of Spain in 1712 for his services.

In 1714–1718, Gallas had the vast palace Clam-Gallas Palace built in the Old Town of Prague with the participation of the most important artists of his time, architect Johann Bernhard Fischer von Erlach and sculptor Matthias Braun.

At the end of his career, Gallas was appointed Viceroy of Naples in summer 1719. Travelling in the July heat and spending the night in fever-ridden places, led to his death 21 days after his arrival in Naples. He died there on 25 July 1719, He was buried in the Carmelite monastery church of the Virgin Mary in Naples. His widow would return to Naples in 1728 as the wife of a next Viceroy Aloys Count of Harrach.

=== Marriage and children ===
On 25 April 1700, Jan Václav of Gallas married Countess Maria Anna Franziska Eva of Dietrichstein-Nikolsburg (1681–1705), daughter of Prince Philipp Sigmund of Dietrichstein. They had one son:

- Count Philip Joseph (1703–1757), married Countess Maria Anna Colonna von Fels (1702–1759), no issue

After his first wife's death, Jan Václav of Gallas married on 26 August 1716, her sister Countess Maria Ernestine of Dietrichstein zu Nikolsburg (1683–1744). They had one daughter:

- Countess Maria Elisabeth (1718–1737), married Count Ferdinand Bonaventura II von Harrach, no issue.
