= Maria Klara of Dietrichstein =

German noblewoman

Countess Maria Klara von Dietrichstein (7 September 1626 – 28 January 1667), was an Austrian noblewoman, member of the House of Dietrichstein and by marriage member of the House of Trauttmansdorff.

== Early life and ancestry ==
She was born in Moravia, the sixth child and fifth (but fourth surviving) daughter of Maximilian, 2nd Prince von Dietrichstein zu Nikolsburg, and his first wife Princess Anna Maria, a daughter of Karl I, Prince of Liechtenstein, Duke of Troppau and Jägerndorf.

== Marriage and issue ==
In Vienna on 16 January 1650, Maria Klara married with Count Johann Frederick of Trauttmansdorff, Baron von Gleichenberg (5 January 1619 – 4 February 1696), Imperial Chamberlain and Privy Counsellor. They had six children:

- Sophie Regina (1652 – ?), married on 25 February 1677 to Johann Joseph, Baron Jenischek von Augeszd.
- Johann Frederick Franz (1654 – 26 July 1687).
- Maria Katharina (1656 – 28 July 1673).
- Johanna Beatrix Isabella (9 March 1661 – 13 April 1741), married firstly on 19 May 1680 to Count Wolfgang Thomas Erdödy and secondly on 9 June 1693 to Count Nikolaus Erdödy.
- Maria Elisabeth Anna (3 Sep 1663 – ?), a nun.
- Maria Klara Eleonore (1664/67 – 7 August 1724), married in 1685 to Count Georg Frederick von Mörsperg.
