= Requiem (Michael Haydn) =

1771 composition by Michael Haydn

- by Michael Haydn
- The composer
- Full title: Missa pro defuncto Archiepiscopo Sigismondo
- Key: C minor
- Catalogue: Klafsky I:8, MH 155
- Occasion: Requiem of Sigismund von Schrattenbach
- Text: Requiem
- Language: Latin
- Composed: 1771
- Vocal: SATB choir and soloists
- Instrumental: brass and timpani; strings; continuo

Michael Haydn wrote the Missa pro defuncto Archiepiscopo Sigismondo, or more generally Missa pro Defunctis, Klafsky I:8, MH 155, following the death of the Count Archbishop Sigismund von Schrattenbach in Salzburg in December 1771. Haydn completed the Requiem before the year was over, signing it "S[oli] D[eo] H[onor] et G[loria.] Salisburgi 31 Dicembre 1771." At the beginning of that year, his daughter Aloisia Josefa died. Historians believe "his own personal bereavement" motivated the composition. Contemporary materials which have survived to the present day include the autograph score found in Berlin, a set of copied parts with many corrections in Haydn's hand in Salzburg and another set at the Esterházy castle in Eisenstadt, and a score prepared by the Salzburg copyist Nikolaus Lang found in Munich.

== Instrumentation ==
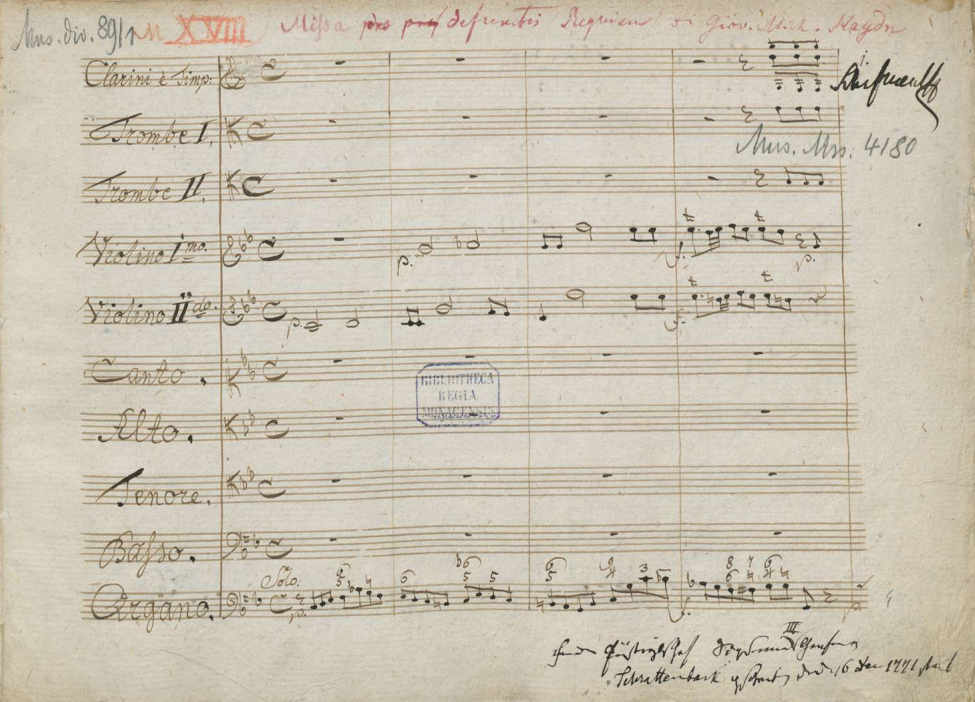
First page of Michael Haydn's Requiem

The mass is scored for the vocal soloists and mixed choir, two bassoons, four trumpets in C, three trombones, timpani and strings with basso continuo.

== Structure ==
The composition is structured in the following five parts:

1. Requiem aeternam Adagio, C minor, common time
2. Sequentia Dies irae Andante maestoso, C minor, 3/4
3. Offertorium Domine Jesu Christe
  - "Rex gloriae" Andante moderato, G minor, common time
  - "Quam olim Abrahae" Vivace, G minor, cut time
  - "Hostias et preces" Andante, G minor, common time
  - "Quam olim Abrahae" Vivace e più Allegro, G minor, cut time
4. Sanctus Andante, C minor, 3/4
  - "Benedictus qui venit..." Allegretto, E-flat major, 3/4
5. Agnus Dei et Communio
  - "Agnus Dei, qui tollis peccata mundi" Adagio con moto, C minor, common time
  - "Cum sanctis tuis" Allegretto, C minor, cut time
  - "Requiem aeternam" Adagio, C minor, common time
  - "Cum sanctis tuis" Allegretto, C minor, cut time

== Tempo ==
Sherman recommends a tempo relation in which "in Agnus Dei et Communio, the of both Agnus Dei and Requiem aeternam equals of the fugue Cum sanctis tuis." Sherman also recommends interpreting the Andante maestoso of the Dies Irae at "a pulse of = MM. 104." Leopold Mozart instructs "that the staccato indicates a lifting of the bow from the string" with no accent implied.

== Influence in Mozart's Requiem ==
Both Leopold and his son Wolfgang Amadeus Mozart were present at the first three performances of Haydn's Requiem in January 1772, and Wolfgang was influenced in the writing of his own Requiem in D minor, K. 626. In fact, Michael Haydn's Requiem is "an important model for Mozart" and strongly suggests that Franz Xaver Süssmayr's completion of Mozart's way does not depart "in any way from Mozart's plans." Pauly notes specific parallels between the two requiems: rhythmic similarities in the setting of the Introit, Quantus tremor and Confutatis maledictis sections, the use of a plainchant melody in the setting of Te decet hymnus, and the subject of the fugue in Quam olim.
