= Opus One =

Opus One may refer to:

- "Opus No. 1", a tune by Sy Oliver and Sid Garris
- "Opus Number One", a composition known for its use as music when placing a caller on hold
- Opus 1 (Opus album), 1975
- Opus 1 (After Crying album), 2009
- Opus One Winery, United States
- An alternative title for the 1971 demo versions of Mike Oldfield's 1973 album, Tubular Bells

== See also ==
- Op. 1 (disambiguation), musical compositions assigned number 1
- Opus number, numbers assigned to musical compositions
