= Hieronymus von Colloredo =

German Catholic archbishop (1732–1812)

His Grace Hieronymus von Colloredo
- Prince-Archbishop of Salzburg
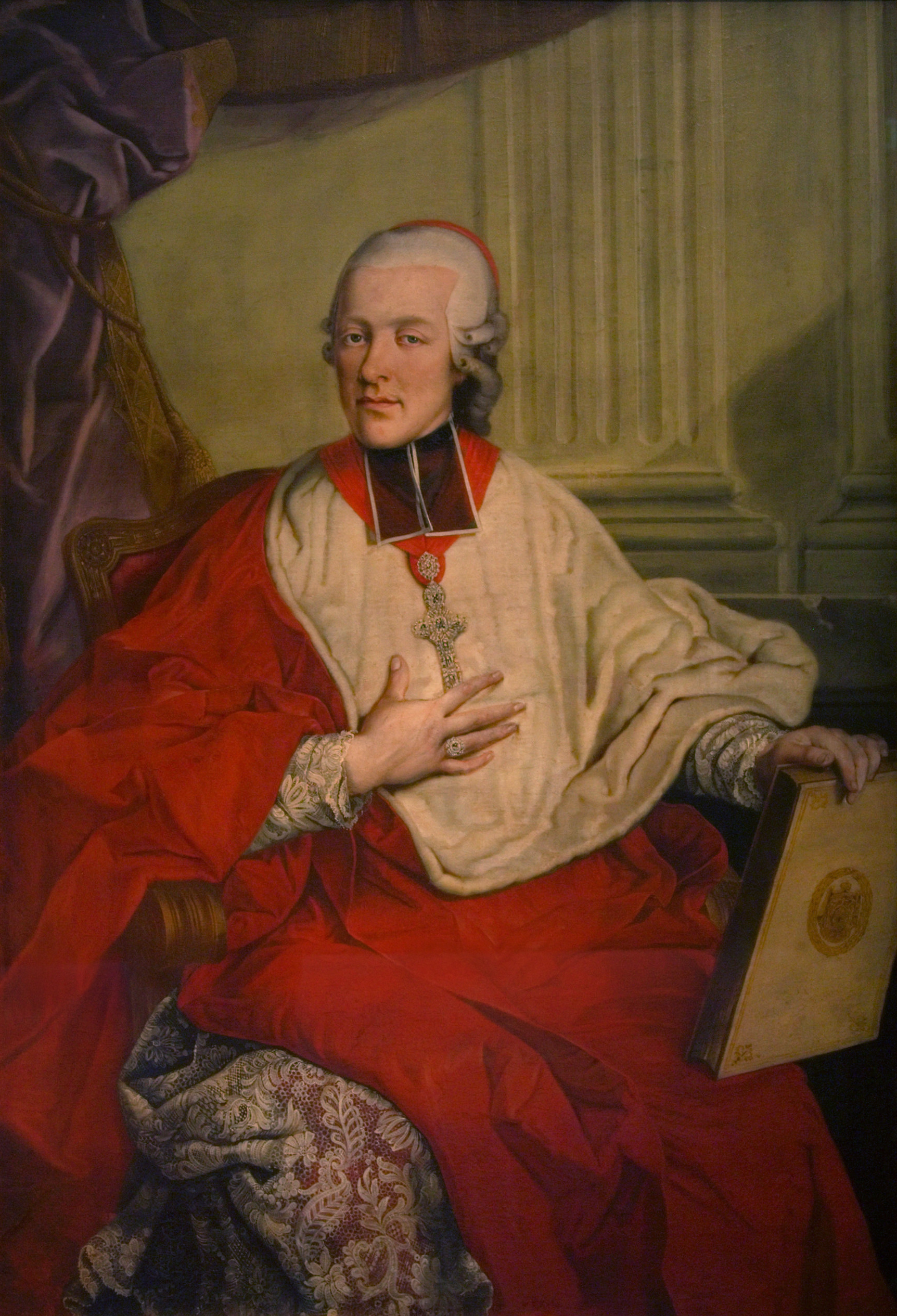
- Portrait by Johann M. Greiter, ca. 1780
- Church: Roman Catholic Church
- Archdiocese: Salzburg
- See: Cathedral of Saints Rupert and Vergilius
- Installed: 22 June 1772
- Term ended: Archbishopric abolished in 1803; 20 May 1812
- Predecessor: Siegmund Christoph von Schrattenbach
- Successor: Augustin Johann Joseph Gruber
- Other post: Prince-Bishop of Gurk

Personal details
- Born: 31 May 1732 Vienna, Austria, Holy Roman Empire
- Died: 20 May 1812 (aged 79) Vienna, Austrian Empire
- Education: Collegium Germanicum et Hungaricum; University of Vienna; Theresianum Academy

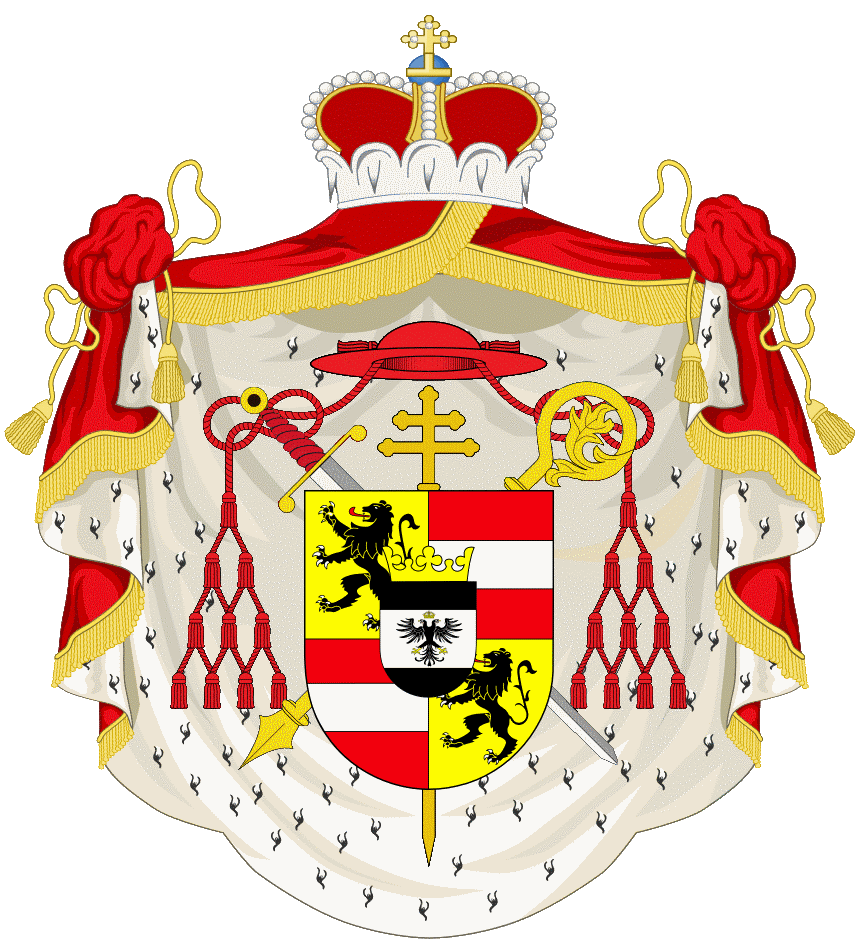
Coat of arms of Hieronymus von Colloredo, as Prince-Archbishop of Salzburg.

Hieronymus Joseph Franz de Paula Graf Colloredo von Wallsee und Melz (German pronunciation: [hiˈʁɔnimʊs ˈjoːzɛf ˈfʁants də ˈpaʊla ˈɡʁaːf kɔloˈʁeːdo fɔn ˈvalzeː ʊnt ˈmɛlts]; Jérôme Joseph Franz de Paula, Count of Colloredo-Wallsee and Mels; 31 May 1732 – 20 May 1812) was Prince-Bishop of Gurk from 1761 to 1772 and Prince-Archbishop of Salzburg from 1772 until 1803, when the prince-archbishopric was secularized. After secularization, Colloredo fled to Vienna and remained the non-resident archbishop of Salzburg, bereft of temporal power, until his death in 1812. He is most famously known as a patron and employer for Mozart.

== Early life ==
He was born in Vienna, Austria, the second son of Count, later Prince Rudolph Joseph von Colloredo (1706–1788), a high-ranking Imperial official and his wife, Countess Maria Gabriele of Starhemberg (1707–1793).

== Life ==
Hieronymus was brought up in a strict religious household, and since his health did not allow him to pursue a military career, he was educated at the Theresianum Academy in Vienna, and studied philosophy at the University of Vienna and theology at the Collegium Germanicum et Hungaricum in Rome. One of his brothers was the Austrian general Wenzel Joseph von Colloredo.

=== Accession ===
The Prince-Archbishopric of Salzburg fell vacant in December 1771, and (with considerable pressure from the Imperial court in Vienna), Colloredo, who had been Prince-Bishop of Gurk since 1761, was elected Prince-Archbishop on 14 March 1772 on the 13th ballot. According to Clive, "it was an unpopular choice in Salzburg whose citizens remained cool to him until the end." Clive continues, "he was extremely autocratic and his dictatorial attitude at times provoked the hostility of the cathedral chapter and of civic officials."

=== Policies ===
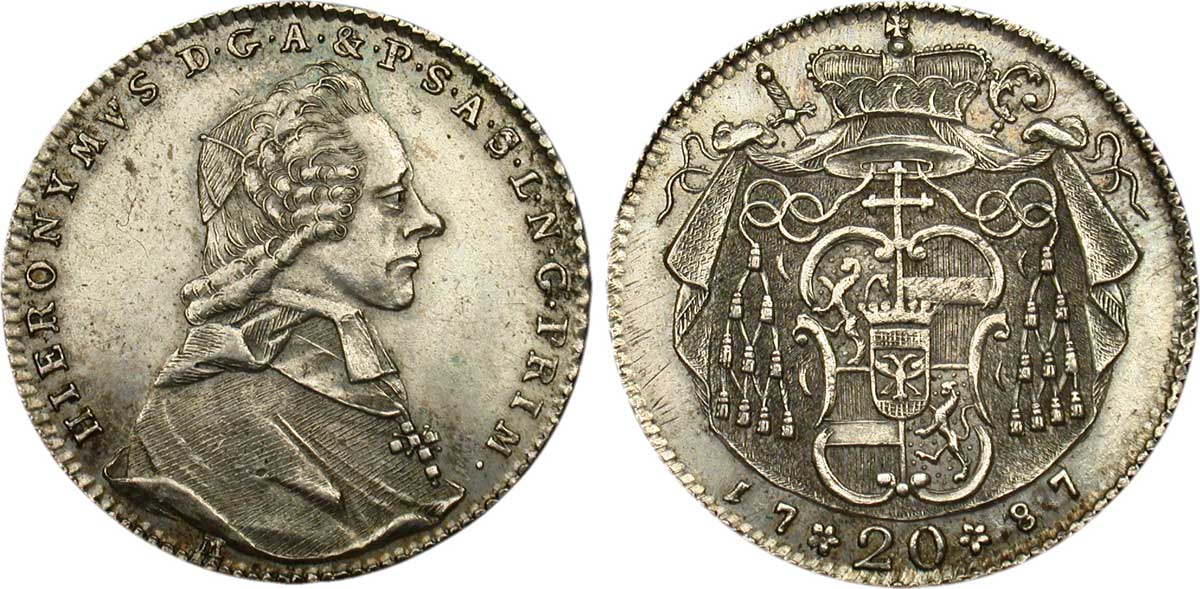
Hieronymus von Colloredo, 1787

During his thirty years as ruler of Salzburg, Colloredo implemented reforms similar to those carried out in the Austrian Empire under Joseph II; see Josephinism. According to Halliwell, he "was ultimately successful in his main aims, but the struggle was a perpetual one ... Colloredo had to establish like-minded people in each institution – ecclesiastical, educational, legal, medical, fiscal, administrative and publicistic – and persuade the reluctant populace to change its entire mentality." Halliwell adds that Colloredo "attracted European-wide admiration for his efforts."

Colloredo also resembled Joseph II in moving the Roman Catholic religion within his domains in a direction similar to Protestantism. Halliwell writes: "Pilgrimages and superstitious practices were banned, processions were restricted, church decoration was limited, musical settings of the Mass were shortened and sacred German hymns introduced ... These changes led to deep resentment, and Colloredo and the architect of the pastoral letter [that implemented the policy], Johann Michael Bönike, were called 'secret Lutherans'. His diocesans would quip: "Our Prince von Colloredo has no Gloria nor Credo." Throughout his life he was close to Jansenism.

=== End of Colloredo's secular rule ===
On 12 December 1801, as French troops under Napoleon drew near to occupying the city, Archbishop Colloredo fled Salzburg, never to return. In 1803, in the course of the German mediatization, the prince-archbishopric was secularized, ending the secular rule of Colloredo. Salzburg was awarded instead to the Grand Duke of Tuscany, who had lost his own state in the Napoleonic upheavals. Later, Salzburg was incorporated into Austria (1805), then Bavaria (1809), then finally into Austria again (1816).

Colloredo, as archbishop, remained the ecclesiastical head of the archdiocese (but not in residence) until his death, aged 79, at Vienna in 1812.

== Colloredo and Mozart ==
Colloredo is well known to history as a patron and employer of Wolfgang Amadeus Mozart. He became exceptionally annoyed with Mozart's frequent absences. After a number of arguments, he ultimately dismissed him with the words, "Soll er doch gehen, ich brauche ihn nicht!" ("He should just go then; I don't need him!")

Mozart's letters to his father recount his indignation at what he portrays as abusive and insulting behavior by the Archbishop. In his letter of 13 June 1781, Mozart recounts that the final indignity of his dismissal by Colloredo was administered by the Archbishop's steward, Count Arco (Karl Joseph Maria Felix, 1743–1830):

...if they don't want me – that's fine by me; --instead of Count Arco accepting my petition or obtaining an audience for me to send it in later or persuading me to let the matter rest and think it over, enfin, whatever he wanted --no, he throws me out of the room and gives me a kick up the backside. – Well, in plain language this means that as far as I'm concerned, Salzburg no longer exists....

Leopold Mozart stayed in Salzburg but "continued to bemoan the failure to replace musicians who had left or died, and the consequent shambles in the court music." Colloredo "sometimes played the violin in the court orchestra."

Religious titles
Preceded by Siegmund Christoph von Schrattenbach	Archbishop of Salzburg; 1772-1803	Succeeded by Augustin Johann Joseph Gruber
