= Ervin Acél (conductor) =

Romanian conductor and pedagogue

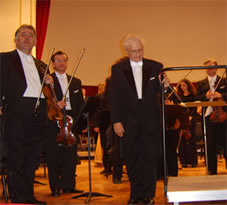
Ervin Acel few months before his death

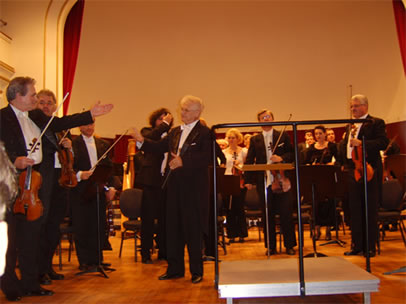
Ervin Acél in Oradea

Ervin Acél (3 June 1935 – 24 August 2006) was a Romanian conductor and pedagogue.

== Biography ==
Ervin Acél was born in Timișoara, the son of a Jewish physician, Móricz Acél, and his wife. He studied in the musical high school in his hometown as well as in the Conservatories of Bucharest and of Cluj-Napoca. He began his conducting career in Botoșani, where he was active from 1960 to 1963.

From 1965 to 1992 he was Chief Conductor of the Oradea Philharmonic Orchestra, in which capacity he also acted as their Administrative Director from 1980 to 1989. He succeeded in greatly raising the artistic level of the ensemble which soon developed into one of Romania's finest orchestras. Besides his numerous concerts, he released some 30 gramophone recordings. During his tenure, he paid special attention to two important composers who had lived in Oradea: Carl Ditters von Dittersdorf and also Michael Haydn, whose symphonies he was the first to record commercially. For a short period between 1981 and 83, Acél was the director of the Istanbul State Opera and Ballet.

From 1991 to 1999 he was the Director and Chief Conductor of the Szeged Symphony Orchestra, the second most important orchestra in Hungary. His performances met with great popular success and during this period he performed a most eclectic repertoire ranging from baroque to modern music.

With this orchestra he toured extensively, giving performances in 1997 in Portugal (where he appeared with the mezzo-soprano Agnes Baltsa), Russia, Italy and Korea. He also conducted the Staatskapelle Dresden, the Washington Philharmonic Orchestra, the Columbus Symphony Orchestra and participated in many international festivals such as the "Giornale Musicale di Vicenza", and the Conservatorio Santa Cecilia in Rome.

Acél was a consummate master of the Viennese Classical Style, giving performances of renowned composers such as Haydn, Mozart, Beethoven, Schubert, Brahms and Richard Strauss. Combining conducting technique, artistic temperament, and a refined sense of orchestral sound, balance and color, he was distinguished as an interpreter of the Russian and French repertories and an authority on the music of Béla Bartók.

Ervin Acèl was a teacher of orchestral conducting, first organizing masterclasses for young conductors in Romania from 1983, in Hungary (Szeged) from 1992 to 1999, and in Austria (Vienna) from 1996. These courses became well known internationally, attracting numerous students from all over the world. Acél, a polyglot, established an easy rapport with the multinational groups of students, alternating with facility between English, German, Italian, French and also his two mother-tongues, Hungarian and Romanian.

His method of instruction was deliberate and considerate and the results most impressive. From 1996, Acél taught conducting at the renowned Vienna Hochschule für Musik und Darstellende Kunst (formerly the Academy of Music and today the Vienna University of Music) in tandem with the Austrian conductor, Leopold Hager, until his death in 2006.

In Italy, he performed at Castelgandolfo for Pope John Paul II, conducting the Dances from Galanta by Zoltán Kodály with the Philharmonia Hungarica. Besides his teaching responsibilities in Vienna, he continued to conduct in Oradea (from 1999), Satu Mare, Timișoara and several other Romanian and Hungarian cities and also toured throughout Asia (Korea, Taiwan, Japan).

== Death ==
After a long disease, Acél died on 24 August 2006 in Vienna, aged 71.

== Discography ==
OLYMPIA OCD 404

Ervin Acél; Oradea Philharmonic Orchestra

- Michael Haydn: Symphony, p. 52, Symphony, p. 42, Pastorello in C major, p. 91, Symphony, p. 28, Symphony, p. 26, Symphony, p. 29;

OLYMPIA OCD 405

Ervin Acél; Oradea Philharmonic Orchestra/Soloists: Gheorghe Ille, Ecaterina Botar, Alexandru Iosif Turzo

- Michael Haydn: Violin concerto, p. 33, Concerto, p. 54;

OLYMPIA OCD 406

Ervin Acél; Oradea Philharmonic Orchestra;

- Michael Haydn: Concerto, B flat major, p. 53, Concerto, C major, P.55

OLYMPIA OCD 407

Ervin Acél; Oradea Philharmonic Orchestra;

- Michael Haydn: Symphony, p. 10, Symphony, p. 20, Symphony, p. 11

OLYMPIA OCD 420

Ervin Acél; Oradea Philharmonic Orchestra / Soloist: Naum Buchmann;

- Carl Nielsen: Concerto for flute and orchestra,
- I.Partos: Concerto for flute and orchestra,
- Jacques Ibert: Concerto for flute and orchestra;

OLYMPIA OCD 268

Ervin Acél; Szeged Symphony Orchestra

- Dmitry Kabalevsky: Symphony No. 1 in C sharp minor, op. 18, Symphony No.2 in C minor, op. 19
