= Klafsky-Verzeichnis =

Catalogue of compositions by Haydn

The Klafsky-Verzeichnis (Klafsky Catalogue) is a thematic-chronological catalogue of choral compositions by Michael Haydn, compiled by Anton Maria Klafsky in 1925.

== I. Messen ==
1. Missa in hon. B.mae Trinitatis, D major. 1754 MH 1
2. Missa Sti. Cyrilli et Methodii, C major. 1758 MH 13
3. Missa dolorum B. M. V. key? 1762? 1794? MH 57 [552]
4. Missa St. Nicolai Tolentini in usum R. R. P. P. Augustinorum. C major. 1771 MH 109, 154
5. Missa S. Gabrielis, C major. Salisb. 7 Nov. 1768 MH 112
6. Missa de St. Raphaele, C major. 7 Nov. 1768 MH 111
7. Missa longa in hon. S. Josefi. 1771 MH 16
8. Requiem in C minor. 1771 MH 155
9. Missa Solemnis de St. Ioanne Nep. 1772 MH 182
10. Missa St. Amandi, C major. 4 Sep 1776 MH 229
11. Missa S. Hieronymi, C major. 14 Sept 1777
12. Missa St. Aloysii, B-flat major. 21. XII. 77
13. Missa in hon. S. Ruperti, C major. 11 VIII 82
14. Missa in hon. S. Dominici, C major. 1786
15. Missa in h. S. Gotthardi, C major. 19 XII 92
16. Missa S. Crucis in Contrapuncto, A minor. 1792 (?)
17. Missa a 2 Chori, C major. 4 Aug 1796
18. Missa in hon. S. Ursulae, C major. 5 VIII 93
19. Missa tempore Quadragesimae. 31 Mart. 1794
20. pro Quad...
21. In coena Domini...
22. sotto il Titolo di S. Teresia...
23. sub titulo S. Francisci...
24. S. Leopoldi pro Festo...
25. S. Francisci...
26. Requiem in B-flat major
27. St. Michaelis...
28. Missa Brevis... Not by Michael Haydn.
29. Missa... Not by Michael Haydn.
30. Introitus...
31. In Gloria. Fuga. ...
32. Missa Brevis in C... Not by Michael Haydn.
33. Missa ex C... Not by Michael Haydn.
34. Missa in C... Not by Michael Haydn.
35. Missa in C... MH 42
36. Missa in C... Not by Michael Haydn.
37. Missa in A... Not by Michael Haydn.
38. Missa Solemnis ex G... Not by Michael Haydn.

== II. Gradualien ==
=== a) Propium de tempore ===
1. - 67.

=== b) Proprium und Commune Sanctorum ===
1. - 49.

== III. Offertorien ==
1. - 44. 45.?

== IV. Verspern ==
1. - 17.

== V. Hymnen, etc. ==
1. Te Deum, C
2. Te Deum, C
3. Te Deum
4. Te Deum
5. Te Deum
6. etc.

== See also ==
- List of compositions by Michael Haydn
- Perger-Verzeichnis
