= Symphony No. 29 (Michael Haydn) =

Portrait of Michael Haydn by Franz Xaver Hornöck

Michael Haydn's Symphony No. 29 in D minor, Opus 1 No. 3, Perger 20, Sherman 29, MH 393, written in Salzburg in 1784, is the only minor-key symphony he wrote.

== Music ==
Scored for two oboes, two bassoons, two horns, two trumpets, timpani, and strings. The bassoons are almost always in unison with the cellos. The Jenő Vecsey edition of 1960 does not show a timpani part, but this is easily enough reconstructed from the trumpet part by tuning the timpani to A and D a fourth apart and using the same rhythms and pitch classes as the trumpets.

It is in three movements:

1. Allegro brillante
2. Andantino in B♭ major
3. Rondeau, Presto scherzante

The first movement, Allegro brillante, is a sonata form that begins with a theme which is basically a D minor scale going up, followed by i and V arpeggiations. The second subject theme uses syncopations and has a dance-like character. The horns are in F, trumpets in D.

The second movement, Andantino in B-flat major, gives the ornamented version of the theme first, in the strings. The trumpets in thirds, reinforced by the other winds, then give the unadorned version of the theme. Horns are B-flat basso and trumpets are in B-flat.

The third movement is a rondeau, Presto scherzante. Horns are in F, trumpets in D. The A theme could be seen as a metamorphosis of the first subject of the first movement. The final statement of the A theme in D minor is almost the same as the first except the horns are absent while they change crooks to D. After a fermata on a V^{7} chord, the A theme is given in D major to close the symphony.
