= Michael Haydn =

Austrian composer (1737–1806)

- Portrait of Haydn by Franz Xaver Hornöck
- Born: Johann Michael Haydn; September 14th, 1737; Rohrau, Archduchy of Austria, Holy Roman Empire
- Died: August 10, 1806 (aged 68); Salzburg, Austrian Empire
- Burial place: Petersfriedhof Salzburg (Crypt 54)
- Relatives: Joseph Haydn (Brother); Mathias Haydn (Father)

Johann Michael Haydn (German: [ˈhaɪdn̩]; 14 September 1737 – 10 August 1806) was an Austrian composer of the Classical period and the younger brother of Joseph Haydn.

== Life ==
Michael Haydn was born in 1737 in the Austrian village of Rohrau, near the Hungarian border. His father was Mathias Haydn, a wheelwright who also served as "Marktrichter", an office akin to village mayor. Haydn's mother Maria, née Koller, had previously worked as a cook in the palace of Count Harrach, the presiding aristocrat of Rohrau. Mathias was an enthusiastic folk musician, who during the journeyman period of his career had taught himself to play the harp, and he also made sure that his children learned to sing.

Michael went to Vienna at the age of eight, his early professional career path being paved by his older brother Joseph, whose skillful singing had landed him a position as a boy soprano in the St. Stephen's Cathedral, Vienna choir under the direction of Georg Reutter, as were Johann Georg Albrechtsberger and Franz Joseph Aumann, both composers with whom Haydn later traded manuscripts. By Michael's 12th birthday he was earning extra money as a substitute organist at the cathedral and had, reportedly, performed preludes and fantasies of his own composition. The early 19th-century author Albert Christoph Dies, based on Joseph's late-life reminiscences, wrote:

Reutter was so captivated by [Joseph]'s talents that he declared to his father that even if he had twelve sons he would take care of them all. The father saw himself freed of a great burden by this offer, consented to it, and some five years after dedicated Joseph's brothers Michael, and still later Johann to the musical muse. Both were taken on as choirboys, and, to Joseph's unending joy, both brothers were turned over to him to be trained.

The same source indicates that Michael was a brighter student than Joseph, and that (particularly when Joseph had grown enough to have trouble keeping his soprano voice) it was Michael's singing that was the more admired.

About 1753, he left the choir school because of the breaking of his voice. In 1760 Michael was appointed Kapellmeister at Großwardein (today Oradea) and later, in 1762, was appointed concertmaster at Salzburg, where he remained for 44 years, during which he wrote over 360 compositions comprising both church and instrumental music. From their mutual sojourn in Salzburg, Haydn was acquainted with Mozart, who held his work in high esteem.

On 17 August 1768 he married singer Maria Magdalena Lipp (1745–1827); their only child, a daughter (Aloisia Josepha, born 31 January 1770) died just short of her first birthday, on 27 January 1771. Although Lipp was disliked by the women in Mozart's family for some reason, she still created the role of Barmherzigkeit ([Divine] Mercy) in Mozart's first musical play, Die Schuldigkeit des ersten Gebots ("The Obligation of the First Commandment"), 1767, and later the role of Tamiri in his short pastoral opera Il re pastore of 1775.

Leopold Mozart, along with Wolfgang, criticized Haydn's drinking habits.

In Salzburg Haydn taught young Carl Maria von Weber and Anton Diabelli.

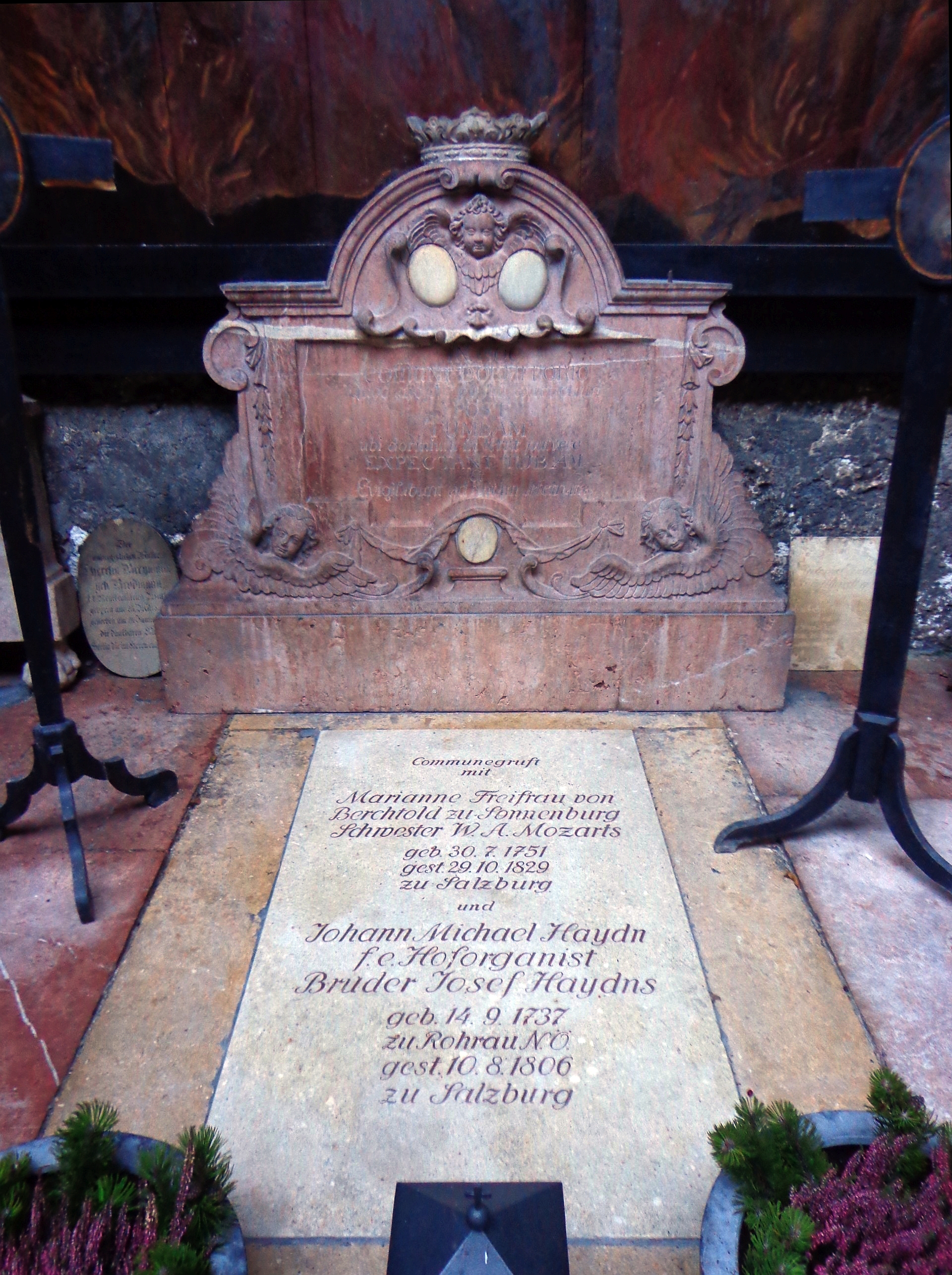
Crypt 54 (St Peter's Cemetery, Salzburg): communal vault in which Maria Anna Mozart and Michael Haydn are buried

Michael remained close to Joseph all of his life. Joseph regarded his brother's music highly, to the point of feeling Michael's religious works were superior to his own (possibly for their devotional intimacy, as opposed to Joseph's monumental and majestic, more secularized, symphonic style). In 1802, when Michael was "offered lucrative and honourable positions" by "both Esterházy and the Grand Duke of Tuscany," he wrote to Joseph in Vienna asking for advice on whether or not to accept either of them, but in the end chose to stay in Salzburg. Michael and Maria Magdalena Haydn named their daughter Aloisia Josepha not in honor of Michael's brother, but after Josepha Daubrawa von Daubrawaick, who substituted as godmother at the baptism for Countess de Firmian.

He died in Salzburg at the age of 68.

== Works ==
Musicologist Karl Geiringer has claimed that Michael Haydn has not received the recognition he deserves from posterity, taking the view that his church music, his choruses for male voices, and many of his instrumental works are on a respectable level and ought to be revived.

Michael Haydn never compiled a thematic catalog of his works, nor did he ever supervise the making of one. The earliest catalog was compiled in 1808 by Nikolaus Lang for his 'Biographische Skizze' (Biographical Sketch). In 1907 Lothar Perger compiled a catalogue of his orchestral works, the Perger-Verzeichnis, for Denkmäler der Tonkunst in Österreich, which is somewhat more reliable than Lang's catalog and attaches P. (for Perger) numbers to many of Haydn's instrumental works. And in 1915 Anton Maria Klafsky undertook a similar work for Michael's sacred vocal music. In 1982, Charles H. Sherman, who has edited scores of many of his symphonies for Doblinger, published a chronological catalog of them which some recording companies have adopted. Later, in 1991, Sherman joined forces with T. Donley Thomas to publish a chronological catalog of Michael's complete works using a single continuous range of numbers after Ludwig Ritter von Köchel's pioneering catalog of all Mozart's works and Otto Erich Deutsch's similar comprehensive compendium for all Schubert's works. Further important amendments to the Sherman/Thomas catalogue have been made by Dwight Blazin.

The task of cataloging Michael's music is made easier by the fact that he almost always entered the date of completion on his manuscripts. Guesswork as to date was necessary only where autograph manuscripts did not survive.

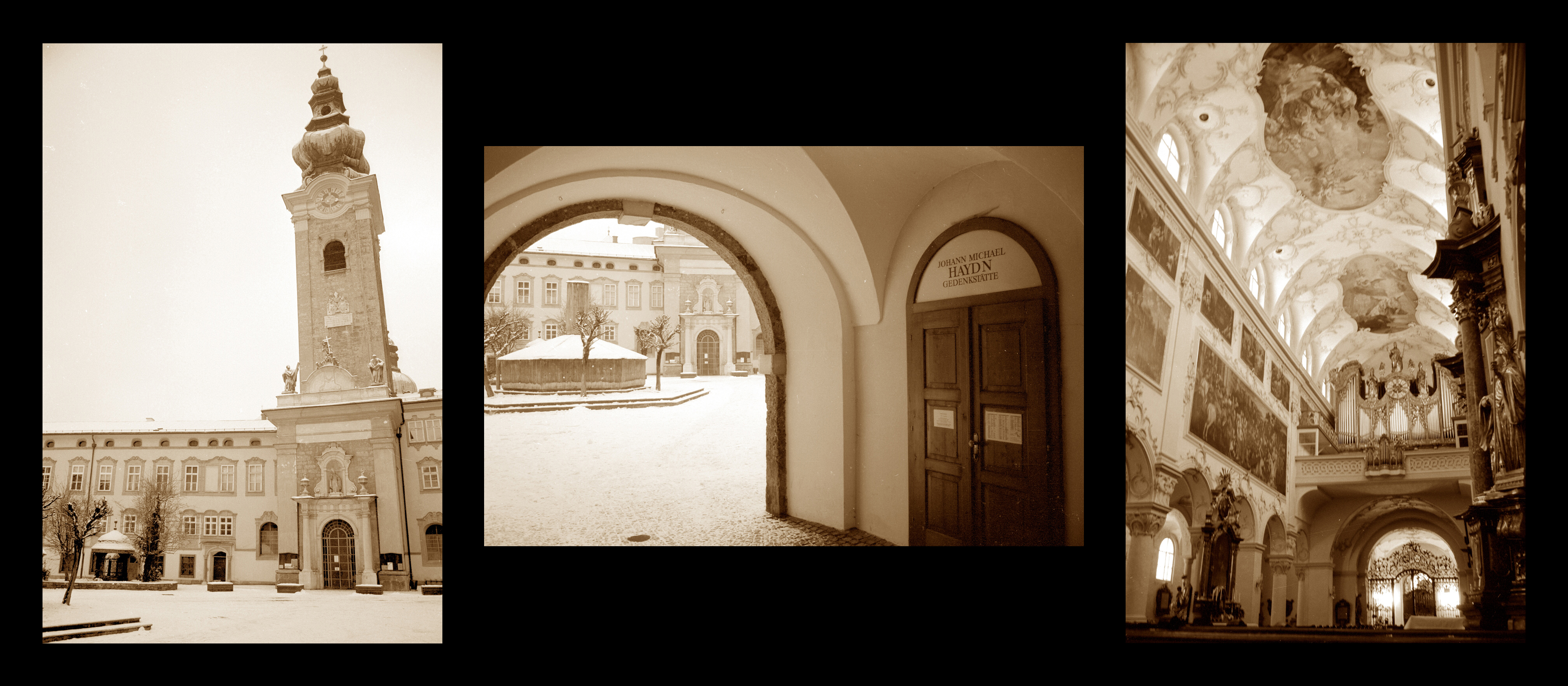
St. Peter's Church in Salzburg and the entrance to the Michael Haydn Library

Haydn's sacred choral works are generally regarded as his most important; his musical taste and skill showed themselves best in his church compositions, which were already in his lifetime regarded as old-fashioned. Some of these works include the Requiem pro defuncto Archiepiscopo Sigismundo (Requiem for the death of Archbishop Siegmund) in C minor, which greatly influenced the Requiem by Mozart; Missa Hispanica (which he exchanged for a diploma at Stockholm); his magnificent last St. Francis Mass in D minor; the motet Lauda Sion which he wished to have sung at his funeral; and a set of graduals, forty-two of which are reprinted in Anton Diabelli's Ecclesiasticon. He wrote several settings of the mass ordinary in German by Franz Seraph von Kohlbrenner, named Deutsches Hochamt.

Haydn was also a prolific composer of secular music, including 41 symphonies and wind partitas, and multiple concertos and chamber music including a string quintet in C major once thought to have been by his brother Joseph. There was another case of posthumous mistaken identity involving Michael Haydn: for many years, the G major symphony now known to be Michael Haydn's Symphony No. 25 was thought to be Mozart's Symphony No. 37 and assigned as K. 444. The confusion arose because an autograph was discovered with the opening movement of the symphony in Mozart's hand and the rest in another's hand. It is now known that Mozart composed the slow introduction to the first movement but the rest of the work is by Michael.

Several of Michael Haydn's works influenced Mozart. Three examples are first, the Te Deum "which Wolfgang was later to follow very closely in K. 141"; secondly the finale of the Symphony No. 23 which influenced the finale of the G major Quartet, K. 387; and lastly the (fugal) transition and (non-fugal) closing theme of the G major second subject expositions of the finales of both Michael's Symphony No. 28 (1784) and Mozart's monumental last Symphony No. 41 (Jupiter) (1788), both in C major.

== List of works ==
=== Instrumental music ===
- 1.1 Symphonies (43 symphonies + single movements of symphonies)
- 1.2 Concertos (12 concertos + 1 single movement)
- 1.3 Serenades (21 serenades, cassations, notturni and divertimenti)
- 1.4 Incidental music (1)
- 1.5 Ballets (3)
- 1.6 Dances (15 collections of Menuetti, 3 of Menuettini, 1 English Dances, 1 German Dances)
- 1.7 Marches (15 marches and fragments of marches)
- 1.8 Quintets (6)
- 1.9 Quartets (19; the authenticity of the quartets MH 308–313 is under dispute.)
- 1.10 Trio Sonatas (10)
- 1.11 Duo Sonatas (4)
- 1.12 Solo Sonatas (2)
- 1.13 Keyboard (19 compositions)
- 1.14 Unknown instrumentation (1)

=== Sacred vocal music ===
- 2.1 Antiphons (47)
- 2.2 Cantatas (5)
- 2.3 Canticles (65)
- 2.4 Graduals (130)
- 2.5 Hymns (16)
- 2.6 Masses (47) including Missa Sancti Francisci Seraphici and Missa tempore Quadragesimae
- 2.7 Motets (7)
- 2.8 Offertories (65)
- 2.9 Oratorios (7)
- 2.10 Psalm settings (19)
- 2.11 Requiem (2, 1 completed only to the Kyrie, completed in 1839 by Paul Gunther Kronecker OSB (1803–1847) )
- 2.12 Other (42)

=== Secular vocal music ===
- 3.1 Arias (8)
- 3.2 Canons (65)
- 3.3 Cantatas (14)
- 3.4 Part-songs (97)
- 3.5 Operas (1)
- 3.6 Serenatas (1)
- 3.7 Singspiele (11)
- 3.8 Songs (46)

== Recordings ==
- Michael Haydn: Symphonies N.1–12,15,16,18,25–28 (1998, CPO) – Slovak Chamber Orchestra conducted by Bohdan Warchal
- Michael Haydn: Requiem pro defuncto Archiepiscopo Sigismundo (2005, Hyperion CDA67510) - The King’s Consort conducted by Robert King
- Michael Haydn: Die Wahrheit der Natur (2018, CPO) – Salzburger Hofmusik o.l.v. Wolfgang Brunner
- Michael Haydn: Endimione (2021, CPO) – Salzburger Hofmusik conducted by Wolfgang Brunner
- Michael Haydn: Kaiser Constantin I (2022, Accent ACC26504) – Purcell Choir & Orfeo Orchestra conducted by György Vashegyi
- Michael Haydn: Missa Sancti Aloysii (2022, Brilliant Classics) – Genova Vocal Ensemble & Accademia Vocaledi Genova conducted by Roberta Paraninfo

== See also ==
- List of Austrians in music

== Notes ==
=== Sources ===
- Dies, Albert Christoph (1810). "Biographical Accounts of Joseph Haydn". Haydn: Two Contemporary Portraits. Translated by Vernon Gotwals. Milwaukee: University of Wisconsin Press.
- Kenyon, Max. Mozart in Salzburg: A Study and Guide. New York: Putnam.
- Rosen, Charles (1997). The Classical Style. New York: Norton. ISBN 0-393-31712-9.
