= List of symphonies in C major =

This is a list of symphonies in C major written by notable composers.

Composer	Symphony
Carl Friedrich Abel	Symphony/Overture in C major, Op. 1 No. 2, D27/E2 (1759?); Symphony/Overture in C major, Op. 4 No. 4, D35/E10 (1762); Symphony in C major, Op. 7 No. 5, E17 (1767); Symphony in C major, Op. 10 No. 4, E22 (1773); Symphony/Overture in C major, Op. 14 No. 1, E25; Sinfonia in C major, Op. 17 No. 4, E34 (1783); Symphony in C major, Six Prussian Symphonies No. 1, E41
Kurt Atterberg	Symphony No. 6 "Dollar Symphony", Op. 31 (1927-28)
Johann Christoph Friedrich Bach	Symphony in C major, BR-JCFB C10 / Wf I: 6 (1770); Symphony in C major, BR-JCFB C 27 / Wf I/17 (1792, lost)
Carl Philipp Emanuel Bach	Symphony in C major Wq 174 \ H 649 (1755); Symphony in C major Wq 182:3 \ H 659 (1773)
Mily Balakirev	Symphony No. 1 (1864-97)
Woldemar Bargiel	Symphony, Op. 30 (1864)
Arnold Bax	Symphony No. 2 in E minor and C major (1924-6)
Ludwig van Beethoven	Symphony No. 1, Op. 21 (1795–1800)
Victor Bendix	Symphony No. 1 "Fjældstigning", Op. 16 (1882)
Franz Berwald	Symphony No. 3 "Singulière" (1845)
Georges Bizet	Symphony in C major (1855); Roma Symphony (1866-75)
Luigi Boccherini	Symphony in C major, G. 495, Op. 21 No. 3 (1775); Symphony in C major, G. 505, Op. 12 No. 3 (1771); Symphony in C major, G. 515, Op. 37 No. 1 (1786); Symphony in C major, G. 523 (1798)
William Boyce	Symphony in C major, Op. 2 No. 3 (1749)
Joly Braga Santos	Symphony No. 3 in C major (1949)
Havergal Brian	Symphony No. 4 Das Siegeslied (1932-33); Symphony No. 7 (1948); Symphony No. 13 (1959); Symphony No. 23 (1965)
John Alden Carpenter	Symphony No. 1 in C major (1916-17)
Alfredo Casella	Symphony No. 3, Op. 63 (1939-40)
George Whitefield Chadwick	Symphony No. 1 (1881)
Felix Draeseke	Symphony in C major (1856, lost); Symphony No. 3 Tragica, Op. 40 (1885-86)
Paul Dukas	Symphony in C (1896)
Georges Enescu	Symphony No. 3, Op. 21 (1916-18)
Robert Fuchs	Symphony No. 1, Op. 37 (1884)
Florian Leopold Gassmann	Symphonies Hill 21, 23, 43, 86. Also, a symphony in C major that might be by Aumon instead.
Anatoly Luppov	Symphony No.1 in C major (1964)
William W. Gilchrist	Symphony No. 1 (1891)
Asger Hamerik	Symphony No. 4 "Symphonie majestueuse", Op. 35 (1884–89)
Joseph Haydn	Symphony No. 2 (1764); Symphony No. 7, Le Midi (1761); Symphony No. 9 (1762); Symphony No. 20 (1766); Symphony No. 25 (1766); Symphony No. 30, Alleluia (1765); Symphony No. 32 (1766); Symphony No. 33 (1767); Symphony No. 37 (1758); Symphony No. 38, Echo (1769); Symphony No. 41 (1770); Symphony No. 48, Maria Theresa (1769); Symphony No. 50 (1773); Symphony No. 56 (1774); Symphony No. 60, Il distratto (1774); Symphony No. 63, La Roxelane (1781); Symphony No. 69, Laudon (1779); Symphony No. 82, The Bear (1786); Symphony No. 90 (1788); Symphony No. 97 (1792)
Michael Haydn	Symphony No. 1, MH 23, Perger 35 (1758-59); Symphony No. 2, MH 37, Perger 2 (1761); Symphony No. 18, MH 188, Perger 10 (1773); Symphony No. 20, MH 252, Perger 12 (1777); Symphony No. 28, Op. 1 No. 2, MH 384, Perger 19, (1784); Symphony No. 39, MH 478, Perger 31 (1788)
Aram Khachaturian	Symphony No. 3 "Symphony-Poem" (1947)
Joseph Martin Kraus	Symphony with Violino Obligato, VB 138; Symphony, VB 139; Symphony, "Singmarinen 4" (lost), VB Anhang 10
Adolf Fredrik Lindblad	Symphony No. 1, Op. 19 (1831)
Borys Lyatoshynsky	Symphony No. 5 "Slavonic", Op. 67 (1965-6)
Wolfgang Amadeus Mozart	Symphony No. 9, K. 73 (1769-70); Symphony in C major, K. 96 (1771, doubtful); Symphony No. 16, K. 128 (1772); Symphony No. 22, K. 162 (1773); Symphony No. 28, K. 200 (1774); Symphony in C major K. 208+102 (1775); Symphony No. 34, K. 338 (1780); Symphony No. 36, K. 425 "Linz" (1783); Symphony No. 41, K. 551 "Jupiter" (1788)
Nikolai Myaskovsky	Symphony No. 14, Op. 37 (1933); Symphony No. 18, Op. 42 (1937); Symphony No. 26, Op. 79 (1948)
Ludolf Nielsen	Symphony No. 3, Op. 22 (1911-13)
Hans Pfitzner	Symphony No. 3, Op. 46 (1940)
Gavriil Popov	Chamber Symphony, Op. 2 (1927, previously known as Septet)
Sergei Prokofiev	Symphony No. 4 (original version), Op. 47 (1930); Symphony No. 4 (revised version), Op. 112 (1947)
Joachim Raff	Symphony No. 2, Op. 140 (1866)
Nikolai Rimsky-Korsakov	Symphony No. 3, Op. 32, 1866-73 (1st version), 1886 (2nd version)
Jean Rivier	Symphony No. 2 for Strings (1937)
Guy Ropartz	Symphony No. 4 in C major (1914)
Anton Rubinstein	Symphony No. 2 Ocean, Op. 42 (Three versions: 1852, 1863 and 1880)
Franz Schmidt	Symphony No. 4 (1932-33)
Franz Schubert	Symphony No. 6, D. 589 (1817-18); Symphony No. 9, D. 944 "The Great" (1828)
Robert Schumann	Symphony No. 2, Op. 61 (1845-46)
Vissarion Shebalin	Symphony No. 5, Op. 56 (1962)
Dmitri Shostakovich	Symphony No. 7, Op. 60 "Leningrad" (1941-42)
Jean Sibelius	Symphony No. 3, Op. 52 (1904-7); Symphony No. 7, Op. 105 (1924)
Igor Stravinsky	Symphony in C (1940)
Louis Spohr	Symphony No. 7 "The Earthly and Divine in Human Life", Op. 121 (1841)
Richard Wagner	Symphony in C major (1832)
Carl Maria von Weber	Symphony No. 1 in C major, Op. 19, J. 50 (1806-7); Symphony No. 2 in C major, J. 51 (1807)
Mieczysław Weinberg	Symphony No. 7, Op. 81 (1964)
Friedrich Witt	Symphony No. 14 in C major
