= Symphony in C =

Symphony in C may refer to:

- Symphony in C major (Wagner), Richard Wagner's Symphony in C (1831/1832)
- Symphony in C (Bizet), Georges Bizet's Symphony in C (1855)
  - Symphony in C (ballet), George Balanchine's 1947 ballet to the Bizet symphony
- Symphony in C (Dukas), Paul Dukas' Symphony in C (1896)
- Symphony in C (Stravinsky), Igor Stravinsky's Symphony in C (1940)
- "Commissioning a Symphony in C", a song by the band Cake, on the album Comfort Eagle
- Symphony in C (orchestra), based in Camden, New Jersey

== See also ==
- List of symphonies in C major
- List of symphonies in C minor
- List of symphonies referred to by their key exclusively
