= Fritz Stein =

German conductor, philosopher and musicologist (1879-1961)

- Born: Friedrich Wilhelm Stein; 17 December 1879; Gerlachsheim, Germany
- Died: 14 November 1961 (aged 81); Berlin, West Germany
- Education: Heidelberg University
- Occupations: Theologian; Conductor; Musicologist; Church musician; Teacher

Friedrich Wilhelm Stein (17 December 1879 – 14 November 1961) was a German theologian, conductor, musicologist and church musician. He found in an archive in Jena the score of the so-called Jena Symphony, which he published as possibly a work by the young Ludwig van Beethoven. After a long period in Kiel from 1919 to 1933, teaching at the Kiel University and as Generalmusikdirektor, he had a leading position in the Reichsmusikkammer of the Nazis in Berlin.

== Career ==
Born Friedrich Wilhelm Stein in Gerlachsheim, Stein first studied theology in Heidelberg and Berlin. He graduated with the Staatsexamen in Karlsruhe in 1902. He then studied with Philipp Wolfrum who, being both a conductor and conductor, became a model for his own work. Stein played organ concerts, but still studied music and musicology with Arthur Nikisch and Hans Sitt at the Leipzig Conservatory until 1906. In Leipzig he had close contact with Max Reger and Karl Straube.

Stein worked in Jena from 1906 as an organist for the town and the university. He found in an archive in Jena the orchestral parts of the so-called Jena Symphony, which he published in 1911, thinking that it might have been written by Ludwig van Beethoven. He found the name "Beethoven" in two parts, and summarized: "As we do not as yet know of anyone, amongst the followers of Haydn and Mozart towards the end of the 19th century, to whom we could attribute such a composition, which heralds the Master ...". The work was performed as one by Beethoven, until H. C. Robbins Landon, a scholar of Joseph Haydn and Wolfgang Amadeus Mozart, found in 1957 manuscript portions of the symphony in the Landesarchiv in Rudolstadt, by Friedrich Witt.

Stein's dissertation in 1910 was Geschichte des Musikwesens in Heidelberg bis zum Ende des 18. Jahrhunderts (History of music in Heideberg until the end of the 18th century). In 1914 he succeeded Reger as court director of music in Meiningen. As an academic teacher, he was Außerordentlicher Professor in Jena from 1913. In 1919 he was appointed Außerordentlicher Professor for musicology in Kiel, and from 1928 also in Ordinarius. In Kiel he was also the organist at the St. Nikolai, Kiel until 1923 and Generalmusikdirektor from 1925 to 1933.

In 1932 he became a member of the Kampfbund für deutsche Kultur. In July 1933, he became Reichsleiter der Fachgruppe Musik of the Kampfbund, responsible for music. Under the Nazis, he was director of the Musikhochschule in Berlin. Among his students was Sergiu Celibidache.

After World War II, he lost all his functions and worked freelance. He was later president of the Verband für evangelische Kirchenmusik. Stein died in Berlin.

== Literature ==
- Albrecht Dümling: Die Gleichschaltung der musikalischen Organisationen im NS-Staat. In: Dietrich Schuberth (ed.): Kirchenmusik im Nationalsozialismus – Zehn Vorträge. Kassel 1995.
- Max Hinrichsen: Festgabe für Fritz Stein, zur Vollendung seines 80. Lebensjahres am 17. Dezember 1959, Bonn : Max-Reger-Institut, 1959.
