= K128 =

K128, or similar, may refer to:

- K-128 (Kansas highway), a state highway in Kansas
- HMS Samphire (K128), a former UK Royal Navy ship
- Symphony No. 16 (Mozart) in C major, by Mozart
