= Nils-Göran Areskoug =

Swedish composer (born 1951)

- Born: 18 May 1951 (age 74); Växjö, Sweden
- Occupations: Physician, musicologist, composer, author, interdisciplinary scholar

Nils-Göran Areskoug (18 May 1951 – 10 June 2025) was a Swedish physician, musicologist, composer, and author. He served as Associate Professor in Transdisciplinary Research at the Swedish Academy and as Associate Professor in Musicology at the University of Jyväskylä in Finland.

== Early life and education ==
Areskoug was born in Växjö, Sweden on 18 May 1951. He trained as a medical doctor and was certified as a cantor and organist at the Lund Cathedral in 1968. Early music teachers in Växjö included Nils Andersson, Ture Olsson, Janis Ozolins, Sylvia Mang-Borenberg, and Ladis and Boiana Müller. He studied musicology with Martin Tegen and literature with E.N. Tigerstedt at Stockholm University (from 1970), was supervised in his doctoral studies by Ingmar Bengtsson at Uppsala University (1974) and mentored by Bo Wallner at Royal University College of Music, Stockholm. As a pianist, he studied at the Mozarteum University of Salzburg with Hans Leygraf in 1969 and, as a conductor, with Sergiu Celibidache in Mainz, Stuttgart and Munich from 1978 to 1995. As a composer, Areskoug attended seminars with mentors such as Olivier Messiaen in Paris 1973, and György Ligeti in Stockholm, during the 1970s. He studied philosophy and aesthetics in Lund, Uppsala and, at the doctoral level, at University of Lausanne (UNIL), until 1993.

After early essays in Smålandsposten, Areskoug worked as a cultural critic for Svenska Dagbladet (1977–1980), and as an academic teacher. Following supervision by leadership philosopher Peter Koestenbaum, Areskoug served, in 1986, as the first director of Kronoberg County Music Foundation (Stiftelsen Musik i Kronoberg), in Växjö. The popular success of his 1984 book on music led to his election as a member of the Swedish Authors' Association.

After medical studies at Lund University and Karolinska Institutet, Stockholm, Areskoug took up the philosophy of science at the intersection between neuroscience and psychoanalysis (and music psychotherapy). Areskoug's 1988 Cand. Med. Thesis at Lund University dealt with the controversy surrounding Adolf Grünbaum's critique of psychoanalysis. It was approved at a public hearing on 1 January 1989 in the Institute of Social Medicine, Malmö University Hospital (MAS) by Professors Lars Janzon, Bengt Scherstén and Germund Hesslow, Lund University Faculty of Medicine.

== Career and achievements ==
Encouraged by the philosophers Georg Henrik von Wright and Paul Feyerabend to pursue his studies of the process of interpretation in sciences and the arts which were viewed by Eduard Marbach at University of Bern as an unorthodox contribution to phenomenological research, Areskoug spoke at University of Helsinki on invitation of Eero Tarasti.

Areskoug was invited to give a speech at University of California, San Diego (UCSD), in 1983, where Nobel Laureate Hannes Alfvén inspired him to pursue talks across disciplines. Visiting Collegium Helveticum ETH Zurich its directors, Professors Helga Nowotny and Yehuda Elkana, encouraged him to propose an arena for transdisciplinary dialogues across sciences and arts in society, a Collegium Europaeum. He held transdisciplinary dialogues on creativity and extra scientific sources of inspiration with Nobel Laureates at the Nobel Foundation centennial celebration in Stockholm, in 2001. He was an expert evaluator for the European Commission in Life sciences, in Brussels 1999; he served as expert advisor to Schweizerischer Nationalfonds (SNF), as peer review evaluator to the Arts & Sciences program of City of Vienna fund for science, research and technology, in 2008, and as an expert reviewer at Torsten och Ragnar Söderbergs stiftelser, Stockholm. He lectured on themes such as knowledge integration across disciplines, on "reflexivity" (a term adopted by George Soros) in financial interpretation at Stockholm School of Economics, on strategic policy at Centre for Advanced Study in Leadership (CASL), and engaged himself in the public debate on development of the research infrastructure of higher education in Sweden.

During his year at BI Norwegian Business School in Norway (1997–1998), Areskoug developed a model of contextual value conversion, an integrated view on patterns of interpretation across fields of practice, founded in cognitive neuroepistemology. Silje A. Sundt reported the focus areas of such translational research, in Norwegian Finansavisen on 16 August 1997: There, he sees interpretive processes as the common denominator behind reflected and intuitive decision, in practice and theory and, in life, art and business. A symphony orchestra is a perfect model for the interaction and leadership of organizations, and in society. In political leadership, public funding, corporate management and private financial markets, investors are creating macroeconomic value to the extent that a comprehensive set of valid criteria for values (human, health, environmental, social, cultural, etc.) are attended to in interpretive paradigm and in interactive socioeconomic action, as elaborated in Financial Interpretation Research (FIR).

Areskoug initiated the Alliance for the Child to promote a social policy for quality in parenting and suggested an online competence and information resource center devoted to counteracting psychosocial maltreatment of children. He proposed a social policy initiative to European governments in order to coordinate a European centre for education, research, prevention, intervention and rehabilitation of victims of emotional abuse. In social sciences he adopted a medical perspective in his analyses.

Areskoug engaged himself in Scholars at Risk against persecution of scholars, and warned against competence deficit among authorities, perils of populism, lack of protection of intellectual freedom and the risk to open society of such ideologies as feminism in Sweden. In one such paper, he critiques what he calls "egofeminism," "femi fascism," and "femistalinism," drawing from writers such as Pär Ström, author of Mans Oppression and Women’s Domination and other writings on what he views as female sexism against males.

== Family background ==
Nils-Göran Areskoug is a member of the Arreskow family and contributed to researching its history and cultural heritage.

== Publications ==
=== Books ===
Areskoug is the author of books and articles covering fields such as the history, aesthetics and analysis of classical music; as well as on the epistemology of transdisciplinary sciences and strategic cognition. A series of his works were published under the motto "In Your innermost soul all is music". Among reviews, the first volume in the series Musical Interpretation Research (MIR), was examined by Pehr Sällström in his Tecken att tänka med.

=== Music ===
Areskoug has composed music for piano, songs and chamber ensembles, as well as several works for orchestra. He occasionally appeared as a performer at improvised concerts and recitals on piano and at rare events as a conductor. His Symphony for Peace for symphony orchestra and choir with poems by former UN Secretary-General Dag Hammarskjöld, commissioned by Stockholm Bishop Krister Stendahl, was premiered at the Stockholm Cathedral, in 1985.

His music won public recognition: In June 1985, Finnish-Swedish philosopher and psychoanalyst Carl Lesche, Stockholm, evaluated: "I was present at the final rehearsal of the premiere of his Symphony for Peace, recently performed in the Stockholm Cathedral, and can bear witness that it is a deeply felt and expressive work of substantial musical worth." The anthropologist Ann Lilljequist of Stockholm University, also at the premiere, said: "This was something unbelievably fine." The first horn player in the orchestra, at the same occasion, said: "This was the finest thing I can recall having experienced."

== Award and prizes ==
- Kronoberg County Council Cultural Award
- Växjö Municipality and Community Cultural Prize
