= Paolo Pietropaolo =

Italian-Canadian broadcaster (born 1976)

Paolo Pietropaolo is a Canadian radio host, producer, writer and musician based in Vancouver, British Columbia. Since January 2012, he has been the host of In Concert, a weekend classical music program on CBC Music.

He is the creator of The Signature Series, which explores the personalities of the key signatures in western music. He also co-created the successful and award-winning documentary series The Wire, along with Jowi Taylor and Chris Brookes. In 2006, Pietropaolo was the cultural correspondent in both English and French for CBC and Radio-Canada's television coverage of the 2006 Winter Olympics in Turin, Italy.

Prior to his career in radio, Pietropaolo studied ethnomusicology at the University of Toronto, and toured extensively in North America in a taiko drumming group led by Kiyoshi Nagata. In addition to his work as a broadcaster, he composes music for theatre and for his radio programs.

== Awards ==
Pietropaolo is a two-time winner of the Prix Italia. In 2005, his series The Wire, the impact of electricity on music, won a Prix Italia, a Peabody Award, and a Director's Choice award at the Third Coast International Audio Festival in Chicago. He won a second Prix Italia in 2013 for The Signature Series.
