= Symphony No. 34 (Mozart) =

1780 composition by W. A. Mozart

- by W. A. Mozart
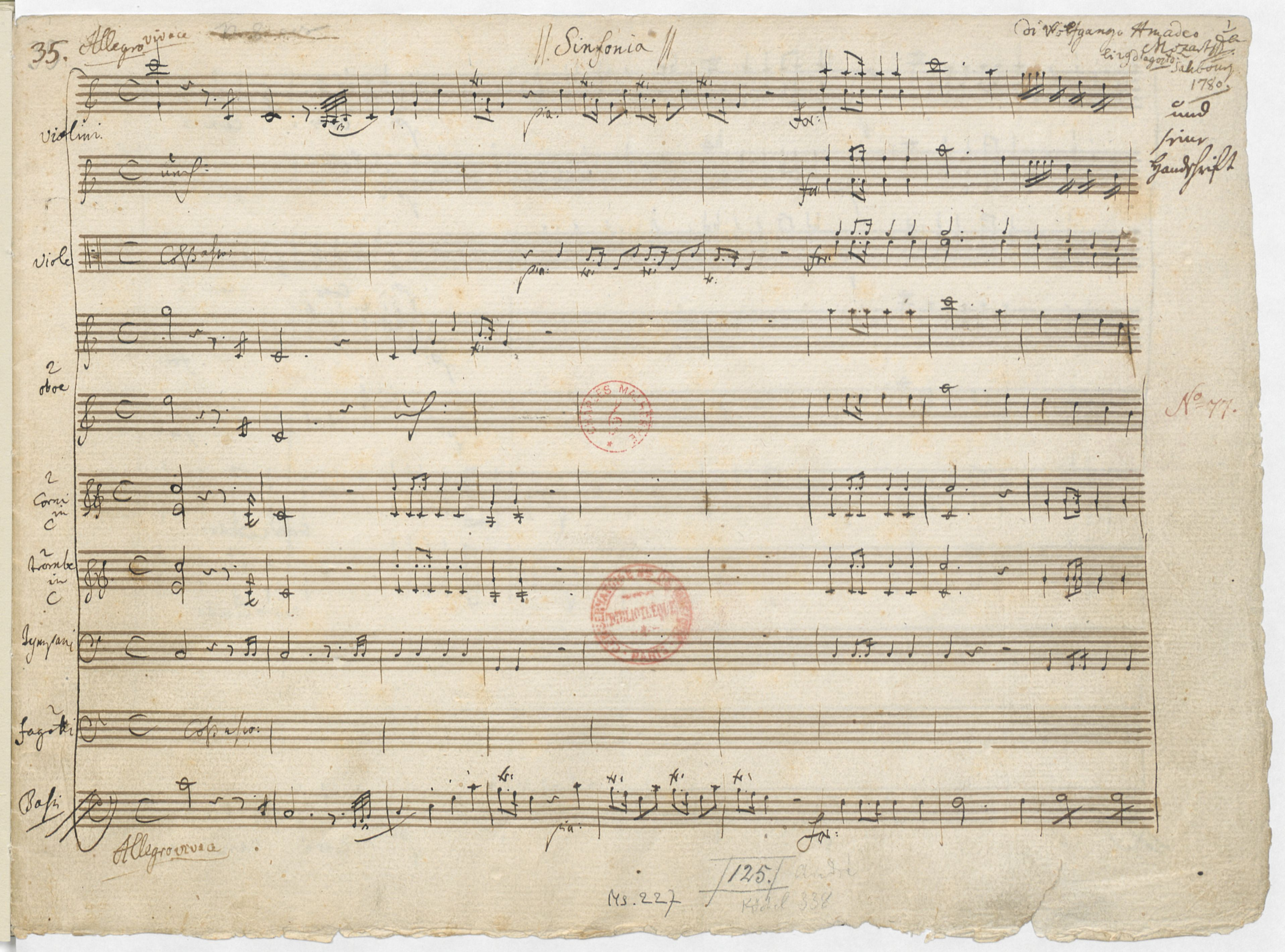
- First page of the autograph manuscript
- Key: C major
- Catalogue: K. 338
- Composed: 1780
- Published: 1797
- Publisher: Johann Anton André
- Duration: c. 20 minutes
- Movements: 3
- Scoring: Orchestra

Symphony No. 34 in C major, K. 338, was written by Wolfgang Amadeus Mozart in 1780, and completed on 29 August that year.

== Structure ==
The work is scored for 2 oboes, 2 bassoons, 2 horns, 2 trumpets, timpani and strings.

Although most symphonies have four movements, this symphony has only three, which was still common in the early classical period:

1. Allegro vivace, 4/4
2. Andante di molto (più tosto Allegretto), 2/4 in F major
3. Allegro vivace, 6/8

The symphony features the fanfares and flourishes typical of the "festive symphony" or "trumpet symphony", which is characteristic of Austrian symphonic writing in C major. This is the first of Mozart's C major symphonies to exhibit this character, but the style would be revisited in his subsequent two works in this key, the 36th and 41st symphonies.

=== I. Allegro vivace ===
The first movement is written in sonata form but also contains many styles and formal aspects of an Italian overture. There is no expositional repeat. The expositional coda contains an overture-like crescendo which is not included in the recapitulation. The development is based entirely on new material. The recapitulation on the exposition's first theme is abbreviated and interrupted by a brief development of that theme. Finally, the movement's coda contains nearly all of this first theme creating the appearance of a reverse-recapitulation common in Italian overtures.

=== II. Andante di molto ===
The second movement in F major is scored for strings with divided violas, and a single bassoon doubling the cellos and bass. All the parts are marked sotto voce.

Alfred Einstein suggested in the third edition of the Köchel catalogue that the Minuet K. 409 was written at a later date (1782) by the composer for this work. However, there is no proof in the sources to support his thesis. Also, K. 409 calls for two flutes in its orchestration which does not match the rest of the symphony.

=== III. Allegro vivace ===
The finale is in sonata form and features energetic tarantella or saltarello rhythms.

== Score ==
I. Allegro vivace

II. Andante di molto (più tosto Allegretto)

III. Finale: Allegro vivace

The autograph score is today preserved in two halves: the first half (pages 1–18) is in the Bibliothèque nationale de France, and the second half (pages 19–28) is in the Jagiellonian Library in Kraków.
