= Symphony No. 97 (Haydn) =

Symphony written by Joseph Haydn

- by Joseph Haydn
- Haydn in 1791
- Key: C major
- Catalogue: Hob. I:97
- Composed: 1792
- Duration: c. 25-30 minutes
- Movements: 4
- Scoring: Orchestra

Premiere
- Date: 3/4 May 1792
- Location: Hanover Square Rooms, London
- Conductor: Joseph Haydn

The Symphony No. 97 in C major, Hoboken I/97, is the fifth of the twelve London symphonies (numbers 93–104) written by Joseph Haydn. It was completed in 1792 as part of the set of symphonies composed on his first trip to London. It was first performed at the Hanover Square Rooms in London on 3 or 4 May 1792. First published in England, it made its way to the continent a few years later and was used by Ludwig van Beethoven as a model for a symphony in C major he never completed, and by Friedrich Witt for the Jena Symphony.

A typical performance of the symphony lasts about 25-30 minutes.

== Music ==
The symphony is scored for two flutes, two oboes, two bassoons, two horns, two trumpets, timpani and strings.

It is in standard four movement form:

1. Adagio — Vivace, 3/4
2. Adagio ma non troppo, 2/2 in F major
3. Menuetto e Trio. Allegretto, 3/4
4. Finale: Presto assai, 2/4

The symphony begins with a slow introduction which deliberately avoids establishing C major. The musicologist Daniel Heartz has described the opening bars as a direct quotation from Mozart's Così fan tutte. The quotation is of a solo oboe passage (in melody and harmony) marking the climax of the opera's plot, the moment Fiordiligi yields to Ferrando. It was while composing this symphony that Haydn learned, across the great distance from Vienna to London, of Mozart's unexpected death. While still in Vienna in 1790, Haydn had attended the rehearsals of the opera at Mozart's invitation.

Following the introduction the first movement continues in faster tempo with a fanfare that emphasizes the three notes of the C major triad.

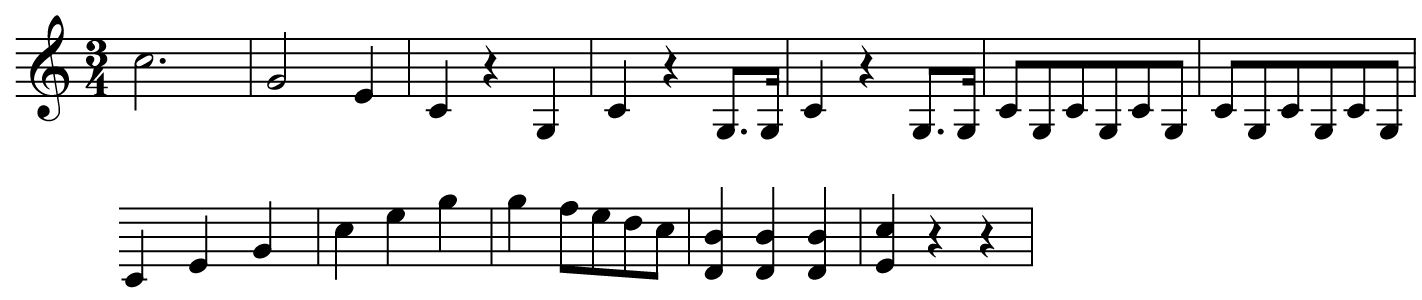

The second subject is a Ländler that makes use of pizzicato in the bass.

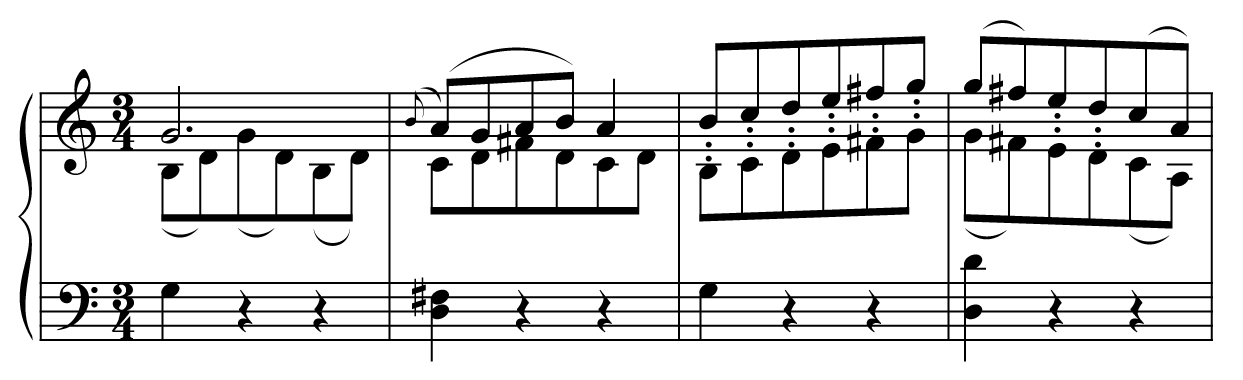

The second movement is a set of F major variations with an irregular episode in F minor and a coda. In the variation following the minore episode, Haydn used the unusual sul ponticello marking instructing the violins to play with the bow near the bridge creating a "glassy" or "metallic" sound.

For the final eight bars of the Trio of the minuet, Haydn instructs the concertmaster ("Salomon Solo" in the score) to play an octave above the rest of the first violins. Indeed, this minuet is extraordinary in Haydn's output: all of its repeats are written out because the scoring changes with each repeat.
