= The Signature Series =

The Signature Series by producer Paolo Pietropaolo (host of In Concert on CBC Radio 2) and co-producer Denise Ball is a music program that explores the personality behind key signatures of music by personifying each of the 24 keys as a person. In 2013, Pietropaolo won the Prix Italia in the category of best work for music for the program.

The Signature Series started when the first post on CBC Music was posted on 18 May 2012. It was a preview of what was coming up in the weeks ahead. The first episode, "G minor: The Contrarian", was posted online on 21 June 2012.

== Episodes ==
Each episode is specific to a music key and a vocal narration by Pietropaolo discusses the personality traits of that key, with accompanying music written in that key, taken from music written over the centuries. Occasionally, pop songs may be featured, though this does not occur in every episode. Each episode begins with an ascending scale, and if the key is a minor key, the harmonic minor is played. At the end of each episode, a musical excerpt is played, while the names of the composers who wrote the music featured in the episode are mentioned. On SoundCloud, the pieces in each episode are timed such that when the piece changes, the pop-up comment identifies the piece being played, together with the composer who wrote the music.

Each key has an image, with its name, its nickname, and a person (or bird, in the case of C minor) whose personality is representative of that key on it, except for C major, whose picture is that of the sky and the sea, with no people featured. Ben Didier of CBC music is the designer for the images.

The Signature Series is divided into two seasons. In season 1, when each episode was published online at CBC Music, the information about each key consisted of the notes in that key (the harmonic minor scale is always mentioned, not the natural minor), its relative major or minor, the number of sharps or flats in its key signature, the key's other nicknames, a list of fictional and real life characters representative of the key, and a couple of quotes about the key. In season 2, the information about each key is replaced by the key's main traits, biggest strength, potential weakness, likes, dislikes, preferred clothing, animal symbol and its most similar zodiac signs (the list of people whose personalities match that of that particular key is included), as each key is personified and portrayed as a living person. Four keys from season 1 were reposted in season 2, so they had the new format that the other 12 keys in season 2 had. They are B minor, D major, G minor and F♯ minor.

The last episode, called "C major: The Final Key", was released online on 22 October 2013. Instead of the normal information and personality traits, the online post on C major confirmed that each key had its own personality. It is also the only key whose gender is not made clear, with both male and female pronouns being used, while all the other keys are either male or female.

On SoundCloud, there are sets to categorise the keys according to number of sharps or flats and their tonality (major and minor). They are The Sharp Majors, The Sharp Minors, The Flat Majors, The Flat Minors and No sharps, No flats.

Season 3, named Orchestral Tales, continued the same approach of personification for ten orchestral instruments. The first episode, "The Flute's Tale", was broadcast on 6 January 2016.

== Personification ==
=== Age ===
Some keys are given "ages", such as A major being referred to as a "teenager" and "the girl next door", while F major "cradles her baby" and C major is portrayed as a young child skipping down the street. Other keys whose "ages" are not specified are assumed to be adults, while some of them, such as D♭ major, C♯ minor, E major, and G♯ minor had their younger selves mentioned, implying that they are now adults. F major had a difficult childhood and one of G minor's other nicknames is "The Moody Teenager".

=== Physical appearances ===
Some keys have their physical appearances described as though they were real people. For example, D minor is said to be "sexy and mysterious, with a glint in her dark, sultry eyes". F major is described as having "a beauty that makes you gasp." As for A major, "there's no denying that she's pretty. Gorgeous, even."

E major is handsome, "having a square jaw and a firm handshake", and E minor is mentioned to attract female attention with "those long, wavy locks". (Both keys are portrayed as male.)

C major is shown to be innocent. "When you look into C major's eyes, the innocence there instantly captures your heart."

C♯ minor is mentioned to wear mascara.

=== Intelligence ===
B♭ major, C minor and G minor are given a mention here. G minor's key characteristics are "Smart. Argumentative. Stubborn", while C minor "knows he's a genius". B♭ major is a "straight A student", showing him to be good at studies and portraying him as intelligent. He is also a "know-it-all" person.

=== Clothing ===
F minor "is never afraid to show a little cleavage. She's been known to wear black leather." D minor is "wrapped in thick velvet robes, trying to keep out the cold".

== Pop songs ==
Pop music appears in a few episodes:

- B minor – "Hotel California"
- A♭ major – "Viva la Vida"
- F minor – "Stayin' Alive"
- E♭ minor – "The Sound of Silence"
