= Ambassadors of Music =

1952 film

- Directed by: Hermann Stöß
- Written by: Wolfgang Brüning (idea); Hermann Stöß
- Starring: Hilde Körber
- Cinematography: Edgar S. Ziesemer
- Production company: Start Film
- Distributed by: Anton E. Dietz-Filmverleih
- Release date: 6 January 1952
- Running time: 85 minutes
- Country: West Germany
- Language: German

Ambassadors of Music (German: Botschafter der Musik) is a 1952 West German musical documentary film directed by Hermann Stöß.

Made in 1951, it charts the revival of the Berlin Philharmonic Orchestra in post-war Germany under the leadership of Sergiu Celibidache. During the war the orchestra's concert hall had been bombed-out. The film portrays the Orchestra as part of a revived German culture, that had survived the Nazi years and was now presenting a positive image of the new West Germany to the people of Europe.

== Cast ==
- Hilde Körber
- Werner Finck
- Josef Pelz von Felinau
- Wolfgang Behrendt
- Albert Ebbecke
- Karla Höcker
- Margo Ufer
- Sergiu Celibidache as himself
- Wilhelm Furtwängler as himself
- Richard Strauss as himself, Archive footage
- Bruno Walter as himself

== Bibliography ==
- Lydia Goehr. Elective Affinities: Musical Essays on the History of Aesthetic Theory. Columbia University Press, 2011.
