= Marino Golinelli =

Italian art collector, businessman, and philanthropist (1920–2022)

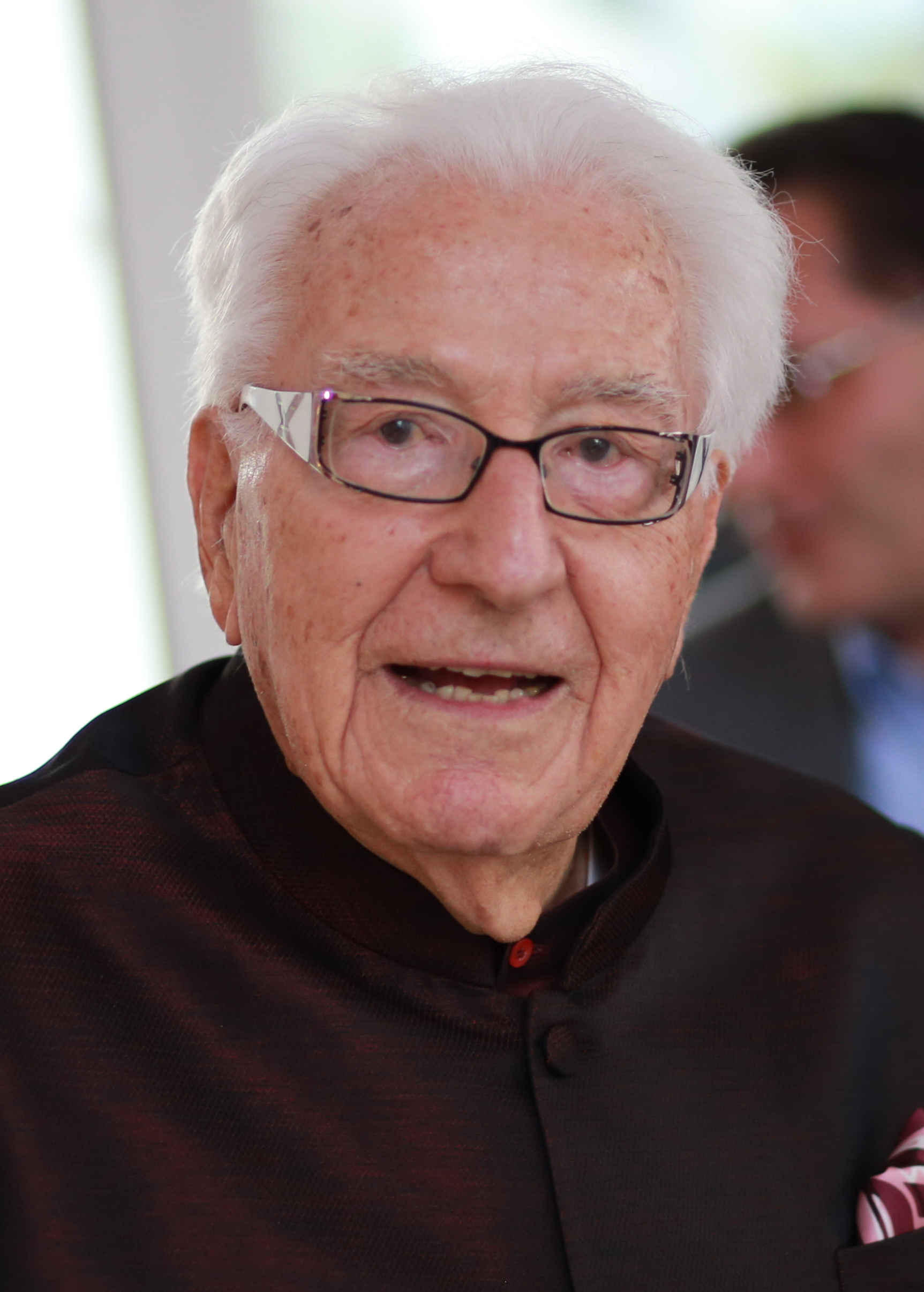
- Golinelli in 2015
- Born: 11 October 1920; San Felice sul Panaro, Italy
- Died: 19 February 2022 (aged 101)
- Education: University of Bologna
- Occupations: Art collector, businessman, philanthropist

Marino Golinelli (11 October 1920 – 19 February 2022) was an Italian art collector, businessman, and philanthropist. He was honored with the Order of Merit for Labour (1979). Golinelli was also a winner of the Golden Neptune Award (2010).

Golinelli died on 19 February 2022, at the age of 101.
