= Golden Neptune =

The Golden Neptune (Italian: "Nettuno d'oro") is a prize conferred by the City of Bologna, since 1974, to citizens, companies, associations and cultural institutions that have brought honour to the city, through their professional or public activity. The prize, awarded by resolution of the municipal council of Bologna, is a reproduction of the statue of the Neptune fountain in Piazza Maggiore, a symbol of the city.

The prize is not to be confused with another of the same name, awarded since 1971, by the Bologna chapter of the Lions Club, for emerging local artists.

== Winners ==
Year	Recipient
1974	I Franco, restaurant
1975	Dr. Ubaldo Belli, President of the Court of Appeals
1976	Gen. Renzo Apollonio, Regional military commander for Tosco-Emiliana
1976	Dr. Giuseppe Lettieri, Questore di Bologna
1976	Dr. Tommaso Boccardi, Secretary General of the City Bologna
1979	Dr. Guido Padalino, Prefect of Bologna
1981	Dr. Riccardo Boccia, Prefect of Bologna
1982	Carlo Alberto Cappelli, Superintendent of Arena di Verona
1982	Ruggero Raimondi, Singer
1983	Doctor Dixie, Jazz band
1983	Prof. Francesco Delitala, Orthopedist
1983	M° Aldo Borgonzoni, Painter
1983	Prof. Carlo Cacciari, Gastroenterologist
1983	Piera Degli Esposti, actor
1983	Prof. Gaetano Placitelli, Surgeon
1984	Prof. Leonardo Gui, Orthopedist
1985	Pupi Avati, Film director
1985	Prof. Domenico Campanacci, Physiotherapist
1986	Prof. Giuseppe Lenzi, Head of Division of Infectious Diseases
1986	Prof. Cesare Musatti, Psychoanalyst
1986	Prof. Leonardo Possati, Surgeon
1987	Sergiu Celibidache, Orchestra director
1987	Prof. Pietro Tagariello, Surgeon
1987	Norma Mascellani, Painter
1988	Valerio Adami, Painter
1990	Father Michele Casali, Founder Centro San Domenico
1991	Dr. Mario Santandrea, Pharmacists
1991	Maiella Brigade, Partisan brigade from Abruzzo
1992	Pompilio Mandelli, Painter
1994	Ilario Rossi, Painter
1994	Giovanni Ciangottini, Painter
1995	Giulio Salmi, Director Opere ONARMO of Bologna
1995	Quinto Ferrari, musician
1996	Mariele Ventre (in memoriam), Director of Coro dell'Antoniano
1996	Alberto Tomba, Skier
1998	Dr. Enzo Mosino, Prefect of Bologna
1998	Giuseppe Gagliardi, Painter
1998	Orchestra of the City Theatre
1998	Vittorio Zironi, Founder Museum of Tappezzeria
1998	Henghel Gualdi, musician
1999	Pierre Marchande, editor
2001	Ivo Galletti, Industrialist
2001	Padre Ernesto Caroli, Founder Antoniano
2002	Pierluigi Collina, football referee
2002	Gianluigi Porelli, President of Virtus
2003	Giacomo Bulgarelli, Footballer
2003	Romano Montroni, Librarian
2004	Luigi Preti, politician
2004	Bologna F.C., The team which won the scudetto in 1964
2005	Domenico Marrano, Surgeon
2006	Luciano Leonesi, Writer e theatre director
2006	Giuseppe Campos Venuti, Architect
2006	Tito Gotti, critic
2007	Fausto Carpani, singer-songwriter
2007	Ducati Motor Holding, Company
2009	Vittorio Franceschi, actor, writer and theatre director
2010	Francesco Guccini, singer-songwriter
2010	Marino Golinelli, Industrialist
2011	Giancarla Codrignani, Professor of classical literature
2011	Fulvio Alberto Medini, general manager of the city of Bologna
2011	Marco Di Vaio, Footballer
2012	Mario Capecchi, Geneticist
2012	Giovanni Sedioli, founder of Fondazione Aldini Valeriani
2012	Alex Zanardi, Racedriver and hand-cyclist
2013	Aldina Balboni, Founder of Casa Santa Chiara
2014	Martina Grimaldi, Swimmer
2014	Marco Belinelli, Basketball player
2015	Ezio Bosso, Composer and conductor
2016	Stadio, Band
2017	Vincenzo Balzani, Chemist
