= Sergiu Celibidache =

Romanian conductor, composer, musical theorist, and teacher (1912–1996)

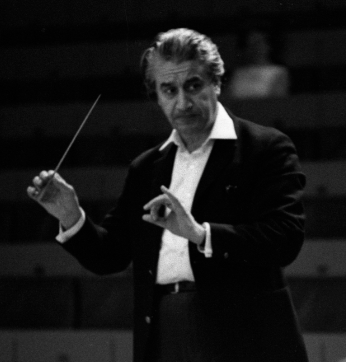
- Celibidache in 1966
- Born: 28 June 1912; Roman, Romania
- Died: 13 August 1996 (aged 84); Nemours, France
- Education: Hochschule für Musik Berlin; Friedrich Wilhelm University
- Occupations: Conductor; Academic
- Organizations: Munich Philharmonic; Hochschule für Musik Mainz; Curtis Institute
- Awards: Léonie Sonning Music Prize; Order of Merit of the Federal Republic of Germany

Sergiu Celibidache (Romanian: [ˈserd͡ʒju t͡ʃelibiˈdake]; 11 July [O.S. 28 June] 1912 – 13 August 1996) was a Romanian conductor, composer, musical theorist, and teacher. Educated in his native Romania, and later in Paris and Berlin, Celibidache's career in music spanned over five decades, including tenures as principal conductor of the Munich Philharmonic, the Berlin Philharmonic, the RAI National Symphony Orchestra, the Orchestre de Radio France, the Swedish Radio Symphony Orchestra and many other European orchestras such as the Stuttgart Radio Symphony Orchestra, the Danish National Symphony Orchestra or the London Symphony Orchestra.

Considering teaching as one of the most important activities, he taught music and musical phenomenology at the Accademia Musicale Chigiana in Siena, Italy as well as at Mainz University in Germany, at the Curtis Institute of Music in Philadelphia, Pennsylvania, at the Schleswig-Holstein Musik Festival in Germany and towards the end at the Schola Cantorum in Paris.

Celibidache categorically refused to release his performances on commercial recordings during his lifetime, claiming that a listener could not have a "transcendental experience" outside the concert hall. Many of the recordings of his performances were released posthumously. He has nonetheless earned international acclaim for his interpretations of the classical repertoire and was known for a spirited performance style informed by his study and experiences in Zen Buddhism. He is regarded as one of the greatest conductors of the 20th century.

== Early life and education ==
Sergiu Celibidache

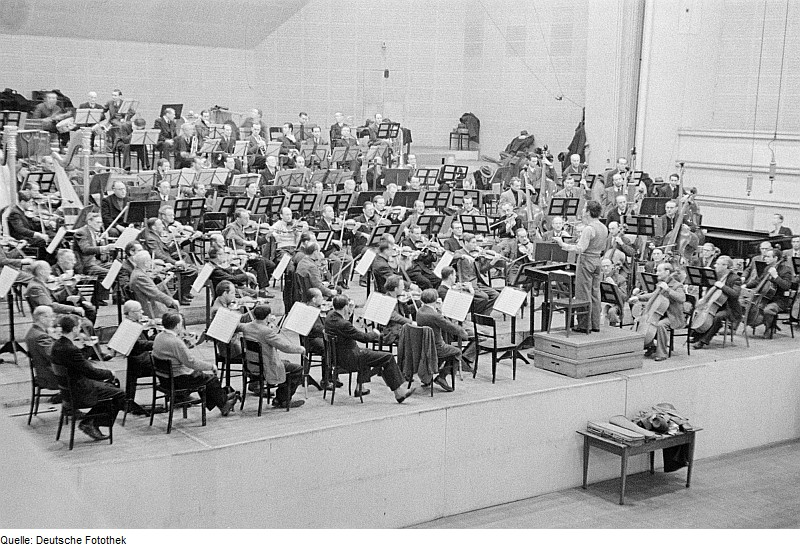
Celibidache as conductor of the Berlin Philharmonic in 1946

Sergiu Celibidache was born on 28 June 1912 to a father of Greek descent and a Romanian mother. His father, Demostene Celebidachi, born in Galați, became a cavalry officer of the Romanian army and later prefect of the Iași region. His mother, Maria Celebidachi (née Brăteanu), was born in Roman, a small city in the Moldavia region of Romania, where his father was a government official. He grew up in Iași, where his family soon moved after his birth. He was already improvising at the piano by the age of four, and after a traditional schooling in mathematics, philosophy and music in Iași, was sent by his father to Bucharest and then to Paris, where he continued his studies. His father had expected him to pursue a political career in Romania, but in 1936 Celibidache enrolled in the Hochschule für Musik (Academy of Music) in Berlin (German authorities erroneously changed his surname from Celebidachi to Celibidache, the form he was known under), where he studied composition with Heinz Tiessen and conducting with Kurt Thomas, Walter Gmeindl and Fritz Stein. He continued with doctoral studies at the Friedrich Wilhelm University (Friedrich-Wilhelms-Universität), where he studied philosophy with Nicolai Hartmann and Eduard Spranger and musicology with Arnold Schering and Georg Schünemann. He submitted a dissertation on Josquin des Prez and received his degree in 1944. Throughout the 1940s, he accompanied and was romantically involved with Romanian-born dancer and choreographer Iris Barbura. During his studies in Berlin, Celibidache was introduced to Zen Buddhism by his teacher Martin Steinke, and Buddhism informed Celibidache's worldview and work for the rest of his life. In a 1986 interview, he said, "I was born a Christian Orthodox, and studied philosophy, but I still couldn't find solutions to my problems. It was through Steinke that I found [...] the way of Zen. All I can say is that without Zen I couldn't have known this strange principle that the beginning is in the end, and the end is in the beginning. Music is nothing but the materialization of this principle."

== Career ==
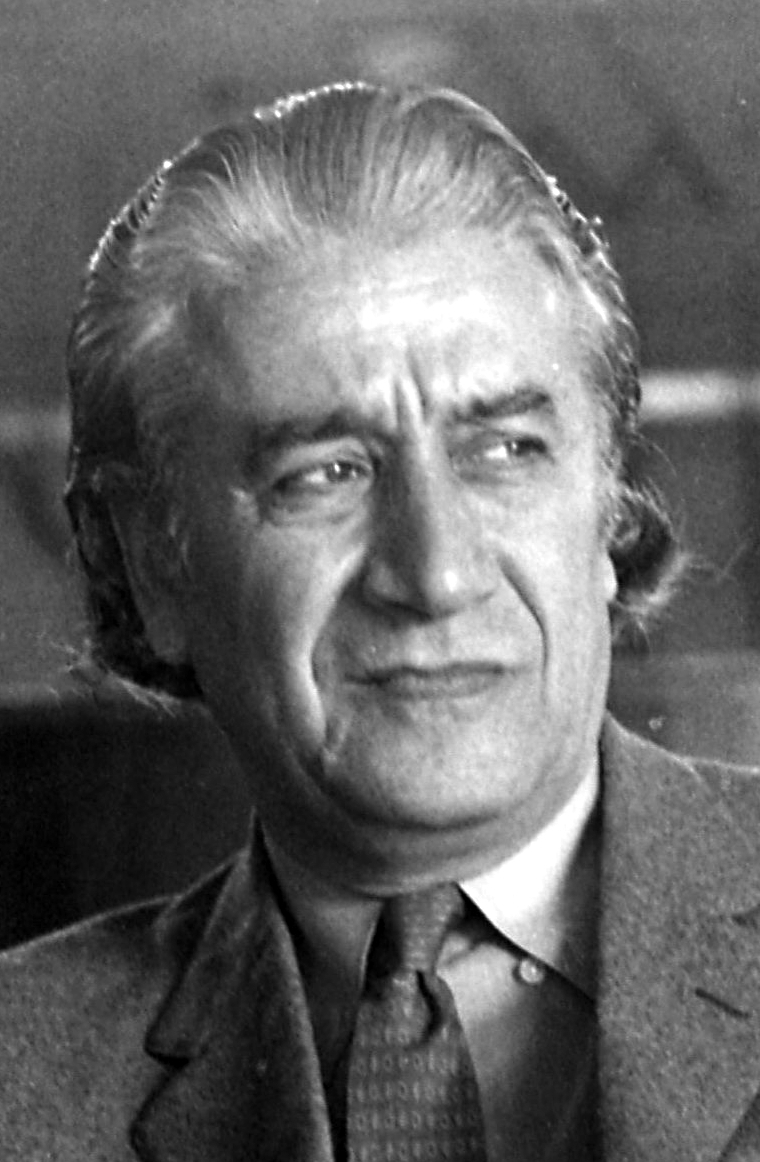
Celibidache in 1969

While Wilhelm Furtwängler was unable to perform until his denazification trial was complete, Celibidache was principal conductor of the Berlin Philharmonic from 1945 to 1952. He received this position shortly after the end of World War II, due to tragic circumstances: Leo Borchard, who was cleared to conduct by the American forces, was shot during a nocturnal car ride. Celibidache just won the contest organised by the Berlin Radio Symphony Orchestra. In search of a replacement, the Berlin Philharmonic plucked Celibidache from the Berlin Radio Symphony Orchestra to become the youngest Generalmusikdirektor of the Berlin Philharmonic. Following Furtwängler's denazification in 1947, Furtwängler was able to conduct the Berlin Philharmonic in alternation with Celibidache.

Celibidache had begun making waves with the orchestra's management regarding the age of some of the musicians as well as his controversial views regarding recordings. Following the death of Furtwängler in 1954, Celibidache was overlooked to be his official successor of the Berlin Philharmonic. Instead, the management chose Herbert von Karajan. It took 37 years before a collaboration could once again take place: the concert of Bruckner's Symphony No. 7 happened only at the instigation of the West German president at the time, Richard von Weizsäcker.

Celibidache later worked with radio orchestras in Stockholm, Stuttgart and Paris. He also worked in Britain in the late 1940s and 1950s, due partly to the promotional efforts of the pianist Eileen Joyce and her partner, an artists' agent. Joyce said that Celibidache was the greatest conductor she had ever worked with: "he was the only one who got inside my soul". In 1970 he was awarded Denmark's Sonning Award. From 1979 until his death he was music director of the Munich Philharmonic. He regularly taught at Hochschule für Musik Mainz in West Germany and in 1984 taught at the Curtis Institute in Philadelphia, Pennsylvania. Teaching was a major focus throughout his life and his courses were frequently open to all without any fee. Among his notable students are Enrique García Asensio, Konrad von Abel, Françoys Bernier, Raffaele Napoli, Rony Rogoff, Bernhard Sieberer, Markand Thakar, and Nils-Göran Areskoug.

He appeared in the film Ambassadors of Music (1952), conducting the Berlin Philharmonic in a performance of Ludwig van Beethoven's Egmont overture. Later, he was the subject of two major documentaries: "Celibidache, let it evolve" by Jan Schmidt-Garre and "Celibidache's Garden" by his son Serge Ioan Celebidachi.

== Later years ==
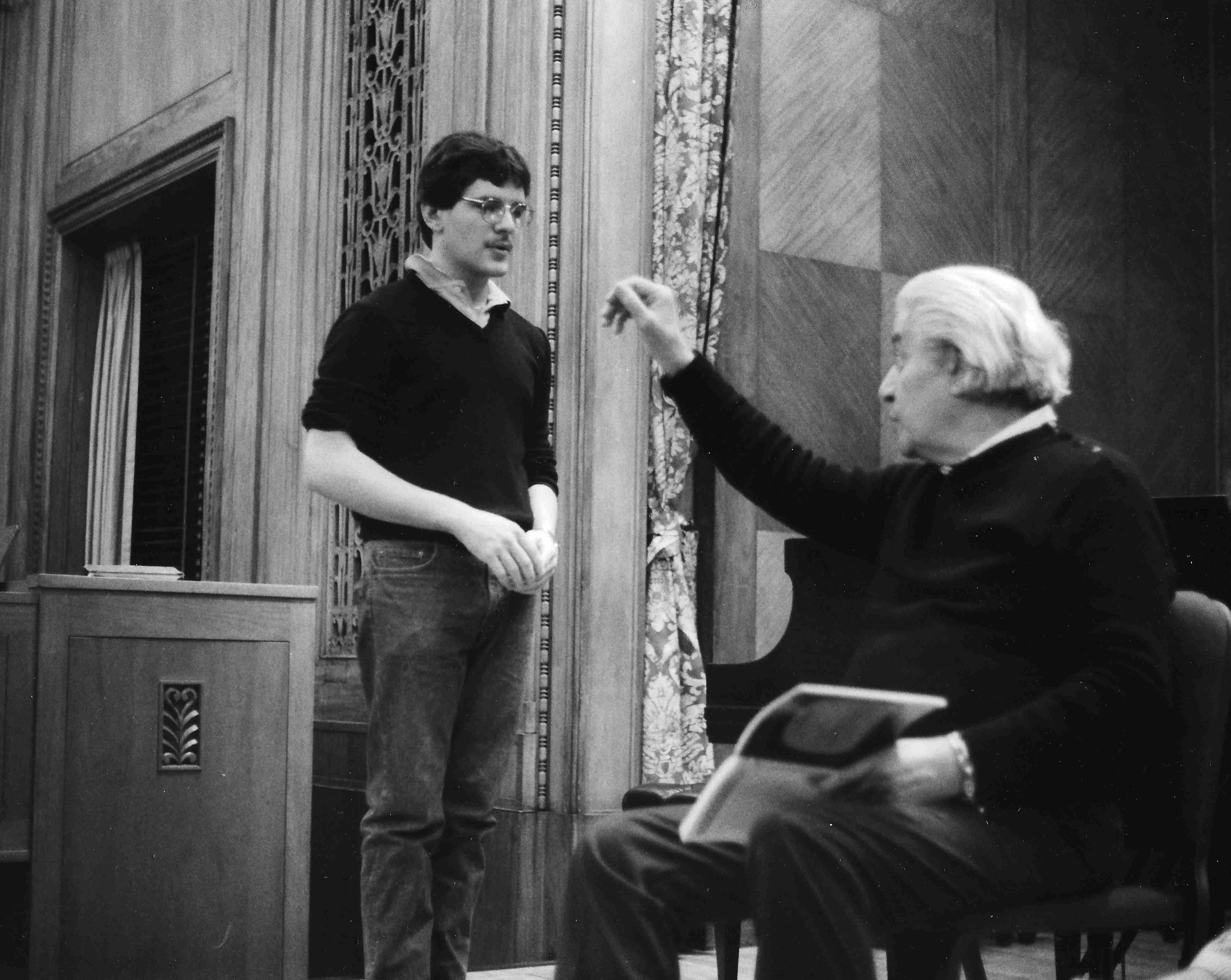
Celibidache giving a conducting lesson at the Curtis Institute in 1984 to student David Bernard

A controversy arose over discriminatory behaviour that came to light during a 12-year legal battle during his tenure at the Munich Philharmonic with trombonist Abbie Conant. Celibidache claimed Conant lacked the "necessary strength" and "emotional empathy" to lead the trombone section. She was asked to sit in the second chair. Celibidache was not invited to give testimony at the trials. Finally, the courts found in favour of Conant. As a consequence, Conant was paid the same as her male colleagues.

After 37 years of absence, Celibidache was asked by Federal President Richard von Weizsacker to return to West Berlin and conduct the Berlin Philharmonic one more time, in order to symbolise the end of communism in Europe and the German Reunification. Celibidache conducted Bruckner 7th, on 31 March 1992 with the Berlin Philharmonic.

Celibidache died at the age of 84 on 14 August 1996 at Nemours, near Paris. He was buried in the Cimetière de Neuville sur Essonne.

== Performance style ==
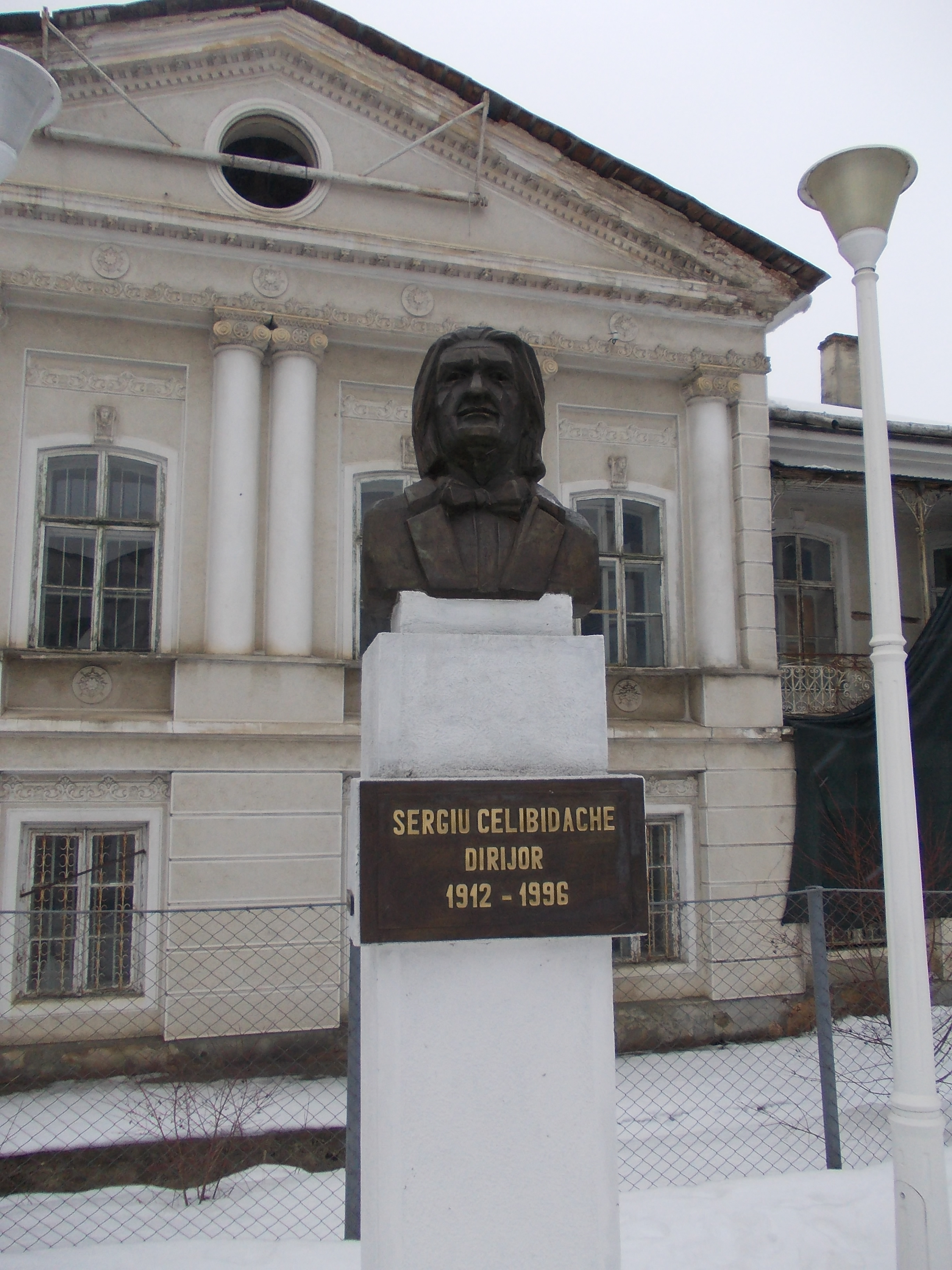
Bust of Sergiu Celibidache at his hometown in Roman

Celibidache's approach to music-making is often described more by what he did not do instead of what he did. For example, much has been made of Celibidache's "refusal" to make recordings even though almost all of his concert activity actually was recorded – having accepted live radio broadcasts – with many released posthumously by major labels such as EMI and Deutsche Grammophon with the consent of his family. In his view, music is made of the cumulation of thousands of "Nos" and one final "yes" when the conditions are eventually all gathered during a concert. It was all about the live experience, the ability to be "in the now".

Celibidache's focus was indeed on creating, during each concert, the optimal conditions for what he called a "transcendent experience". Aspects of Zen Buddhism, such as ichi-go ichi-e, strongly influenced his music making. He believed that transcendental experiences were extremely unlikely to ensue when listening to recorded music, so he eschewed them. As a result, some of his concerts did provide audiences with exceptional and sometimes life-altering experiences, including, for example, a 1984 concert in Carnegie Hall by the Orchestra of the Curtis Institute that New York Times critic John Rockwell described as the best of his 25 years of concert-going.

Celibidache was well known for his demands for extensive rehearsal time with orchestras. An oft-mentioned feature of many of his later concerts, captured in the live recordings of them, is a slower tempo than what is considered the norm, while in fast passages (especially in his earlier performances) his tempi often exceeded metronome markings by far. In Celibidache's own view, however, criticism of a recording's tempo is irrelevant, as it is not (and cannot be) a critique of the performance but rather of a transcription of it, without the ambience of the moment, for him, a key factor in any musical performance. As Celibidache explained, the acoustic space in which one hears a concert directly affects the likelihood of the emergence of his sought-after transcendent experience. The acoustic space within which one hears a recording of one of his performances, on the other hand, has no impact on the performance, as it is impossible for the acoustic features of that space to stimulate musicians to play slower or faster.

That his recorded performances differ so widely from the majority of other recordings has led them to be seen by some as collector's items rather than mainstream releases and 'one-offs' rather than reference recordings.

== Personal life ==
In 1965, Celibidache married Ioana Procopie Dumitrescu (1924–2012). They had one son, Sergiu Ioan Celibidache ("Serge"), born 19 June 1968. Serge directed his father's 2025 biopic The Yellow Tie, in which he is portrayed by Ben Schnetzer, as well as Ewan Horrocks and John Malkovich.

== Compositions ==
Most of his music compositions are not performed and not published.

=== Major compositions ===
- Der Taschengarten (ca.1978) – published by Schott Music
- Haz de Necaz (ca. 1992) – published by Schott Music
- Hommage to Arturo Benedetti Michelangeli (ca.1995) – unpublished
- Requiem Mass – unpublished
- 4 Symphonies – unpublished

== Discography ==
Notable releases have been his Munich performances of Beethoven, Johannes Brahms, Anton Bruckner, Robert Schumann, Johann Sebastian Bach, Gabriel Fauré and a series of live performances with the London Symphony Orchestra and the Stuttgart Radio Symphony Orchestra:

- 1945: Debussy/Roussel: Petite Suites, with Berlin Radio Symphony Orchestra (Naxos)
- 1945: Prokofiev: Berlin Philharmonic Orchestra, Prokofiev Symphony in D major, Op. 25 "Classical" (HMV C 3729-30) 78 rpm
- 1948: Tchaikovsky: Symphony No. 5 in E minor, Op. 64 LPO (Decca AK 2036–41 78 rpm)
- 1949: Mozart: Symphony No. 25 in G minor, K. 183 (Decca AK 2197-9 78 rpm)
- 1951: Mozart: Symphony No. 25 in G minor, K. 183 (Decca LXT 2558)
- 1951: Tchaikovsky: Symphony No. 5 in E minor, Op. 64 LPO (Decca LXT 2545)
- 1969: Tchaikovsky: Symphony No. 5 in E minor, Op. 64 LPO (Decca Eclipse ECM 833)
- 1985: Beethoven: Concerto for Violin and Orchestra (Electrecord)
- 1988: Mendelssohn: Sinfonia N. 4 "Italian"; Dvořák: Sinfonia N. 9 Dal Nuovo Mondo (Frequenz)
- 1990: Tchaikovsky: Symphony No. 5; Nutcracker Suite (London)
- 1991: Mozart: Requiem; Vivaldi: Stabat Mater (Arkadia)
- 1991: Tchaikovsky: Symphony No. 6 "Pathetique"; Roméo et Juliette (Arkadia)
- 1994: Brahms: Symphony No. 2 & Haydn Variations, Op. 56a (Fonit-Cetra Italia)
- 1994: Brahms: Symphony Nos. 3 & 4 (Fonit-Cetra Italia)
- 1994: Bruckner: Symphony No. 7 (Andromeda)
- 1994: Mozart: Grand Mass, K. 427 (Cetra)
- 1995: Beethoven: Symphony Nos. 2 & 4 (Nas)
- 1997: Bartók: Concerto for Orchestra (EMI Music Distribution)
- 1997: Beethoven: Symphony Nos. 4 & 5 (EMI Music Distribution)
- 1997: Debussy: La Mer; Iberia (EMI Music Distribution)
- 1997: Haydn: Symphony Nos 103 & 104 (EMI Music Distribution)
- 1997: Mozart: Symphony No. 40; Haydn: "Oxford Symphony" (EMI Music Distribution)
- 1997: Ravel: Ma Mère l'Oye; Bolero, Le tombeau de Couperin; Alborada del Gracioso (Fonit-Cetra Italia)
- 1997: S. Celibidache Conducts Beethoven & Brahms (Tahra)
- 1997: Schubert: Symphony No. 9 (EMI Music Distribution)
- 1997: Schumann: Symphonies 3 & 4 (EMI Music Distribution)
- 1997: Tchaikovsky: Romeo and Juliet Fantasy–Overture; Mussorgsky: Pictures at an Exhibition (EMI Music Distribution)
- 1997: Tchaikovsky: Symphony No. 5 (EMI Music Distribution)
- 1997: Tchaikovsky: Symphony No. 6 (EMI Music Distribution)
- 1997: The Young Celibidache, Vol. II (Tahra)
- 1997: Wagner: Orchestral Music (EMI Music Distribution)
- 1998: Bruckner 3 (EMI Music Distribution)
- 1998: Bruckner 4 (EMI Music Distribution)
- 1998: Bruckner 6 (EMI Classics)
- 1998: Bruckner 7; Te Deum (EMI Music Distribution)
- 1998: Bruckner 8 (EMI Classics)
- 1998: Bruckner 9 in Concert and Rehearsal (EMI Classics)
- 1998: Bruckner: Mass in F minor (EMI Music Distribution)
- 1998: Bruckner: Symphonies No. 3-9; Mass in F minor, Te Deum (EMI Classics)
- 1998: Shostakovich: Symphonie No. 7 (Magic Talent)
- 1999: Beethoven: Symphonies No. 2 & 4 (EMI Music Distribution)
- 1999: Beethoven: Symphony No. 3 (EMI Music Distribution)
- 1999: Beethoven: Symphony No. 6; Leonore (EMI Music Distribution)
- 1999: Brahms: Ein deutsches Requiem (Audiophile Classics)
- 1999: Brahms: Symphonies Nos. 2, 3, 4 (EMI Music Distribution)
- 1999: Brahms: Symphony No. 1; Ein deutsches Requiem (EMI Music Distribution)
- 1999: Celibidache Conducts Beethoven 7 & 8 (EMI Music Distribution)
- 1999: Mussorgsky: Pictures at an Exhibition; Stravinsky: The Fairy's Kiss Suite (Deutsche Grammophon)
- 1999: Prokofiev: Scythian Suite; Symphony No. 5 (Deutsche Grammophon)
- 1999: Rimsky-Korsakov: Sheherazade; Stravinsky: The Firebird Suite (Version 1923) (Deutsche Grammophon)
- 1999: Schumann: Symphony No. 2; Brahms: Haydn Variations (EMI Music Distribution)
- 1999: Sergiu Celebidache (Box) (No Noise)
- 1999: Strauss: Don Juan; Tod und Verklärung; Respighi: Pini di Roma (Rehearsals) (Deutsche Grammophon)
- 1999: Tchaikovsky: Symphony No. 2 Op. 17 "Piccola Russia"; Dvořák: Concerto Op. 104 (Urania)
- 1999: Tchaikovsky: Symphony No. 2; Brahms: Symphony No. 4 (Arkadia)
- 2000: Brahms: Symphony No. 2; Mozart: Symphony No. 25 (Urania)
- 2000: Bruckner: Symphonies Nos. 3–5 (Box Set) (Deutsche Grammophon)
- 2000: Bruckner: Symphony No. 3 (Deutsche Grammophon)
- 2000: Bruckner: Symphony No. 4 (Deutsche Grammophon)
- 2000: Bruckner: Symphony No. 5 (Rehearsal) (Deutsche Grammophon)
- 2000: Bruckner: Symphony No. 5; Mozart: Symphony No. 35 (Deutsche Grammophon)
- 2000: Franck: Symphony in D; Hindemith: Mathis der Mahler (Deutsche Grammophon)
- 2000: Richard Strauss: Till Eulenspiegel; Don Juan; Shostakovich: Symphony No. 9 (Deutsche Grammophon)
- 2000: Schubert: Symphony No. 8 "Unfinished"; Tchaikovsky: Nutcracker Suite (Aura Classics)
- 2000: Sibelius: Symphonies Nos. 2 & 5 (Deutsche Grammophon)
- 2001: Sergiu Celibidache (Classica d'Oro)
- 2001: Sergiu Celibidache et la Philharmonie de Berlin (Tahra)
- 2001: Shostakovich: Symphony No. 7 "Leningrad" (Classica d'Oro)
- 2002: Prokofiev: Symphonies Nos. 1 & 5; Violin Concerto No. 1 (Classica d'Oro)
- 2003: Mendelssohn: Symphony No. 4 "Italian"; Bizet: Symphony in C (Archipel)
- 2004: Bach: Mass in B minor (EMI Classics)
- 2004: Bruckner: Symphonies Nos. 3–5, 7–9 [Box Set] (Deutsche Grammophon)
- 2004: Celibidache Conducts Milhaud & Roussel (EMI Music Distribution)
- 2004: Celibidache Plays Mozart's Requiem (EMI Classics)
- 2004: Fauré: Requiem; Stravinsky: Symphony of Psalms [Live] (EMI Music Distribution)
- 2004: Overtures by Berlioz, Mendelssohn, Schubert, Smetana & Strauss (EMI Music Distribution)
- 2004: Prokofiev: Symphonies 1 & 5 (EMI Music Distribution)
- 2004: Rimsky-Korsakov: Scheherazade (EMI Music Distribution)
- 2004: Shostakovich: Symphony No. 7 'Leningrad' (Pickwick)
- 2006: Celibidache: Der Taschengarten (Universal Classics & Jazz)
- 2006: Celibidache: The Complete EMI Edition [Limited Edition] [Box Set] (EMI Classics)
- 2006: Sergiu Celibidache: Lesen & Hören [CD+Book]
- 2007: Beethoven: Symphony No. 3 "Eroica"; Overture Leonre III (Archipel)
- 2007: Bruckner: Symphony No. 5
- 2007: Schumann: Symphony No. 4; Mussorgsky: Pictures at an Exhibition
- 2008: Sergiu Celibedache Conducts Kölner Rundfunk-Sinfonie-Orchester (Orfeo)
- n.d.: Anton Bruckner: Symphonies Nos. 5 & 8; Brahms: Haydn Variations, Op. 56 (Exclusive)
- n.d.: Anton Bruckner: Symphony No. 7 in E major (As Disc)
- n.d.: Antonín Dvořák: Symphony N. 7; Johann Strauss Jr.: Die Fledermaus Overture (Artists)
- n.d.: Bach: Mass in B minor (Exclusive)
- n.d.: Beethoven: Concerto No. 5 for Piano and Orchestra "Emperor" (Electrecord)
- n.d.: Beethoven: Symphonies Nos. 2 & 4 (Artists)
- n.d.: Beethoven: Symphony No. 7; Bach: Brandenburg Coincerto No. 3; Ravel: Le Tombeau de Couperin (Archipel)
- n.d.: Berlioz: Symphonie fantastique, Op. 14; Roméo et Juliette (Arkadia)
- n.d.: Brahms: Ein deutsches Requiem (Myto Records)
- n.d.: Brahms: Symphonies Nos. 1–4 [Box Set] (Deutsche Grammophon)
- n.d.: Brahms: Symphonies Nos. 2 & 3 (Deutsche Grammophon)
- n.d.: Brahms: Symphonies Nos. 2–4; Variations on a theme from Haydn (Acum)
- n.d.: Brahms: Symphony No. 1 (Acum)
- n.d.: Brahms: Symphony No. 1 (Deutsche Grammophon)
- n.d.: Brahms: Symphony No. 4 (Rehearsal) (Deutsche Grammophon)
- n.d.: Brahms: Symphony Nos. 2 & 3 (Legend)
- n.d.: Brahms: The Complete Symphonies; Haydn Variations; Alto Rhapsody (Living Stage)
- n.d.: Bruckner: Symphonies 4 & 9 (Exclusive)
- n.d.: Bruckner: Symphonies 7 & 8 (Deutsche Grammophon)
- n.d.: Bruckner: Symphonies 7–9 [Box Set] (Deutsche Grammophon)
- n.d.: Bruckner: Symphony 7 (Deutsche Grammophon)
- n.d.: Bruckner: Symphony 9 (Deutsche Grammophon)
- n.d.: Bruckner: Symphony No. 3 (Exclusive)
- n.d.: Bruckner: Symphony No. 7 (Arkadia)
- n.d.: Bruckner: Symphony No8, WAB108; Schubert: Symphony in Bf No5, D485 (Deutsche Grammophon)
- n.d.: Celibidache [Box Set] (Deutsche Grammophon)
- n.d.: Celibidache Conducts Debussy & Ravel (Box Set) (Deutsche Grammophon)
- n.d.: Celibidache Conducts Debussy (FED)
- n.d.: Celibidache Conducts Debussy / Respighi / Milhaud (Originals)
- n.d.: Celibidache Conducts Mussorgsky, Stravinsky, Rimsky-Korsakov, Prokofiev (Box Set) (Deutsche Grammophon)
- n.d.: Celibidache Conducts Ravel & Stravinsky (Originals)
- n.d.: Celibidache Conducts Stravinsky (Arlecchino)
- n.d.: Celibidache Conducts Tchaikovsky (Grammofono 2000)
- n.d.: Celibidache Festival (Originals)
- n.d.: Celibidache, Vol. 1: Symphonies (EMI Classics)
- n.d.: Celibidache, Vol. 3: French & Russian Music (EMI Classics)
- n.d.: Celibidache, Vol. 4: Sacred Music & Opera (EMI Classics)
- n.d.: Debussy: Ibéria; Ravel: Rapsodie espagnole; Alborada del gracioso (Deutsche Grammophon)
- n.d.: Debussy: La Mer (Rehearsal) (Deutsche Grammophon)
- n.d.: Debussy: La Mer; La Damoiselle élue; Milhaud: Saudades do Brazil (Fonit-Cetra Italia)
- n.d.: Debussy: Nocturnes; La Mer (Deutsche Grammophon)
- n.d.: Dvořák: Concerto in B minor / Eight Slavonic Dances (Arkadia)
- n.d.: Dvořák: Violin Concerto; Symphony 9 (Concerto)
- n.d.: Franck: Symphonie en Ré mineur; Wagner: Siegfried-Idyll; Tristan und Isolde prelude (Arkadia)
- n.d.: Great Conductors of the 20th Century, Vol. 39: Sergiu Celibidache (EMI Music Distribution)
- n.d.: Haydn: Symphony No. 103; Mozart: Symphony No. 38 (Originals)
- n.d.: Haydn: Symphony No. 104 "London"; Debussy: Jeux; Igor Stravinsky: Jeux de Cartes (Urania)
- n.d.: Legendary Performers Vol. 2 (As Disc)
- n.d.: Mozart: Great Mass in C minor, K. 427; Concerto for Two Pianos and Orchestra, K. 365; Haffner Serenade, K. 250 (Acum)
- n.d.: Mozart: Great Mass in C minor, K. 427; Haffner Serenade, K. 250 (Fonit-Cetra Italia)
- n.d.: Mozart: Requiem (Artists)
- n.d.: Mozart: Requiem (Il Sabato)
- n.d.: Mozart: Symphonies Nos. 40 & 41; Schubert: Symphony No. 5; Schumann: Symphony No. 2 (Living Stage)
- n.d.: Mozart: Symphony No. 41; Schubert: Symphony No. 5 (Memories)
- n.d.: Mussorgsky: Pictures at an Exhibition; Cherubini: Symphony in D major; Bäck: Intrada for Orchestra (Originals)
- n.d.: Mussorgsky: Pictures at an Exhibition; Strauss: Don Juan (Artist)
- n.d.: Prokofiev: Romeo E Giulietta/Berlioz: Romeo E Giulietta/Tchaikovsky: Romeo E Giulietta (Fonit-Cetra Italia)
- n.d.: Prokofiev: Romeo et Juliet (Extracts) (Deutsche Grammophon)
- n.d.: Prokofiev: Symphony No. 5; Prokofiev, Berlioz, Tchaikovsky: Romeo et Juliet (Acum)
- n.d.: Ravel: La Valse; Daphnis et Chloé; Suite No. 2; Le Tombeau de Couperin (Deutsche Grammophon)
- n.d.: Richard Strauss: Tod und Verklärung; Vier letzte Lieder; Igor Stravinsky: L'oiseau de feu; Ravel: Daphnis et Chloé (Acum)
- n.d.: Rimsky-Korsakov: Schéhérazade (Originals)
- n.d.: RTSI Orchestra Conducted by Sergiu Celibidache: Schubert, Tchaikovsky
- n.d.: Schubert/Schumann: Symphonies (Fonit-Cetra Italia)
- n.d.: Schubert: Symphonies Nos. 5 & 8; Schumann: Symphonies No. 1 "Primavera" & 2 (Acum)
- n.d.: Schubert: Symphonies Nos. 8 & 9; Franck: Symphony in D minor; Mussorgsky-Ravel: Pictures at an Exhibition (Urania)
- n.d.: Schumann: Piano Concerto in A minor, Op. 54; Richard Strauss: Vier letzte Lieder (Artists Live Recording)
- n.d.: Schumann: Symphony Nos. 1 & 2 (Cetra)
- n.d.: Sergiu Celibidache alla RAI, Vol. 1: Johannes Brahms – Sinfonie 1–4, Variazione su un tema di Haydn (Fonit-Cetra Italia)
- n.d.: Sergiu Celibidache Alla Rai, Vol. 5 (Fonit-Cetra Italia)
- n.d.: Sergiu Celibidache Conducts (Artists)
- n.d.: Sergiu Celibidache Conducts (EMI Classics)
- n.d.: Sergiu Celibidache Conducts (Enterprise)
- n.d.: Sergiu Celibidache Conducts (Urania)
- n.d.: Sergiu Celibidache Conducts Beethoven: Symphonies Nos. 2 & 4 (FED)
- n.d.: Sergiu Celibidache conducts Blacher, Mendelssohn, Brahms, Cherubini, Schwarz-Schilling (Tahra)
- n.d.: Sergiu Celibidache Conducts Brahms: Ein Deutsches Requiem, Op. 45 (IDIS)
- n.d.: Sergiu Celibidache conducts Franck, Tchaikovsky (IDIS)
- n.d.: Sergiu Celibidache Conducts Mendelssohn, Haydn, Beethoven (IDIS)
- n.d.: Sergiu Celibidache conducts Schubert & Schumann (IDIS)
- n.d.: Sergiu Celibidache Conducts the Berliner Philharmoniker (Myto Records)
- n.d.: Sergiu Celibidache, Vol. 1 (Arlecchino)
- n.d.: Sergiu Celibidache: From the collection of Deutsches Rundfunkarchiv (Music & Arts)
- n.d.: Sergiu Celibidache: Magier des Klangs (Documents)
- n.d.: Shostakovich: Symphonies 1 & 9; Barber: Adagio for Strings (EMI Classics)
- n.d.: Shostakovich: Symphony No 5, Op. 47; Symphony No. 9, Op. 70 (Arkadia)
- n.d.: Shostakovich: Symphony No. 7 "Leningrad" (Grammofono 2000)
- n.d.: Strauss: Don Juan; Tod und Verklärung; Respighi: Pini di Roma (Deutsche Grammophon)
- n.d.: Strauss: Ein Heldenleben (Deutsche Grammophon)
- n.d.: Stravinsky: L'Oiseau de feu; Ravel: Daphnis et Chloé; La Valse; Pavane pour une infante défunte (Cetra)
- n.d.: Tchaikovsky: Symphony No. 4; Nutcracker Suite (Angel Records / EMI Classics)
- n.d.: Tchaikovsky: Symphony No. 6; Monteverdi: Vespers of 1610 – Ave Maris Stella (Archipel)
- n.d.: The Art of Sergiu Celibidache, Volume 1–7 (Arlecchino)
- n.d.: The Complete RIAS Recordings (Audite)
- n.d.: The Stuttgart Recordings, Vol. 3 (Deutsche Grammophon)
- n.d.: The Unpublished Celibidache in Naples (Originals)
- n.d.: Verdi: Requiem (EMI Classics)
- n.d.: Wagner: Tristan und Isolde, WWV90; Siegfried Idyll, WWV103 (Arkadia)

== Honors, awards, and decorations ==
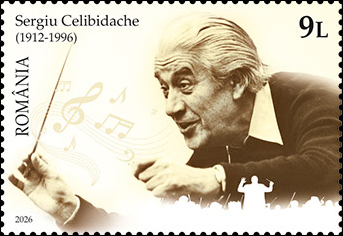
Celibidache on a 2026 stamp of Romania

- 1954: Grand Cross of Merit of the Federal Republic of Germany
- 1955: Berliner Kunstpreis (West Germany)
- 1970: Chevalier of the Order of Vasa (Sweden)
- 1970: Léonie Sonning Music Prize (Denmark)
- 1984: Franco Abbiati Prize (Italy)
- 1987: Nettuno d'oro (Italy)
- 1991: Bavarian Order of Merit (Germany)
- 1992: Honorary Citizen of the City of Munich (Ehrenbürgerrecht von München)
- 1992: Honorary Member of the Romanian Academy
- 1993: Bavarian Maximilian Order for Science and Art (Germany)
- 1994: Doctor honoris causa, Iași Academy of Art and University of Iași
- 1994: Honorary Citizen (Cetățean de Onoare) of Iași (Romania)
- 1994: Order of Merit of Rhineland-Palatinate (Germany)
- 1995: Commandeur des Arts et des Lettres (France)

== See also ==
- Çelebi, Turkish title and surname
