= C major =

Major scale based on C

- Relative key: A minor
- Parallel key: C minor
- Dominant key: G major
- Subdominant key: F major

Component pitches
- C, D, E, F, G, A, B

C major is a major scale based on C, consisting of the pitches C, D, E, F, G, A, and B. C major is one of the most common keys used in music. Its key signature has no flats or sharps. Its relative minor is A minor and its parallel minor is C minor.

The C major scale is:

These are less common and mostly used in jazz. Changes needed for the melodic and harmonic versions of the scale are notated with accidentals as necessary. The C harmonic major and melodic major scales are:

On the piano, the C major scale can be played using only the white keys starting on C.

== Scale degree chords ==
The scale degree chords of C major are:

- Tonic – C major
- Supertonic – D minor
- Mediant – E minor
- Subdominant – F major
- Dominant – G major
- Submediant – A minor
- Leading-tone – B diminished

== Compositions ==
Twenty of Joseph Haydn's 106 symphonies are in C major, making it his second most-used key, second to D major. Of the 134 symphonies mistakenly attributed to Haydn that H. C. Robbins Landon lists in his catalog, 33 are in C major, more than any other key. Before the invention of the valves, Haydn did not write trumpet and timpani parts in his symphonies, except those in C major. Landon writes that it wasn't "until 1774 that Haydn uses trumpets and timpani in a key other than C major... and then only sparingly." Most of Haydn's symphonies in C major are labelled "festive" and are of a primarily celebratory mood. Wilfrid Mellers believed that Mozart's Symphony No. 41, written in 'white' C major, "represented the triumph of light". (See also List of symphonies in C major.)

Many masses and settings of the Te Deum in the Classical era were in C major. Mozart and Haydn wrote most of their masses in C major. Gounod (in a review of Sibelius' Third Symphony) said that "only God composes in C major". Six of his own masses are written in C.

Of Franz Schubert's two symphonies in the key, the first is nicknamed the "Little C major" and the second the "Great C major".

Scott Joplin's "The Entertainer" is written in C major.

The idea that musical keys can conjure up specific feelings has been discussed in some instances. This notion is further explored in a radio program called The Signature Series. American popular songwriter Bob Dylan claimed the key of C major to "be the key of strength, but also the key of regret". Sibelius's Symphony No. 7 is in C major and that key was of great importance in his previous symphonies.

=== Notable examples ===
- Johann Sebastian Bach
  - Toccata, Adagio and Fugue in C major, BWV 564
  - Prelude and Fugue in C major, BWV 846
  - Sonata No. 3 in C major, BWV 1005
  - Cello Suite No. 3, BWV 1009
- Joseph Haydn
  - Cello Concerto No. 1 (1761–65)
  - Symphony No. 7, Le Midi (1761)
  - Symphony No. 60, Il distratto (1774)
  - Symphony No. 82, The Bear (1786)
  - String Quartet No. 32, The Bird (1781)
  - String Quartet No. 62, Emperor (1797–98)
  - Mass No. 10, Missa in tempore belli (1796)
- Wolfgang Amadeus Mozart
  - 12 Variations in C major on the French song "Ah, vous dirai-je, Maman", KV 265
  - Concerto for flute and harp, KV 299/297c
  - Piano Concerto No. 8, KV 246 ("Lützow")
  - Piano Concerto No. 13, KV 415
  - Piano Concerto No. 21, KV 467
  - Piano Concerto No. 25, KV 503
  - Piano Sonata No. 1, KV 279
  - Piano Sonata No. 7, KV 309
  - Piano Sonata No. 10, KV 330
  - Piano Sonata No. 16, KV 545
  - String Quartet No. 19, KV 465 ("Dissonance")
  - Symphony No. 16, KV 128
  - Symphony No. 22, KV 162
  - Symphony No. 28, KV 200
  - Symphony No. 34, KV 338
  - Symphony No. 36, KV 425 ("Linz")
  - Symphony No. 41, KV 551 ("Jupiter")
- Ludwig van Beethoven
  - Piano Sonata No. 3, Op. 2, No. 3
  - Piano Concerto No. 1, Op. 15
  - Symphony No. 1, Op. 21
  - Rondo Op. 51, No. 1
  - Piano Sonata No. 21, Op. 53 ("Waldstein")
  - Triple Concerto for violin, cello, and piano in C major, Op. 56
  - String Quartet No. 9, Op. 59/3 ("Rasumovsky")
  - Mass in C major, Op. 86
- Franz Schubert
  - Wanderer Fantasy, Op. 15 D. 760
  - Fantasy for violin and piano, D. 934
  - Sonata for 4-hands, D. 812 (Grand Duo)
  - Symphony No. 6 (Little)
  - Symphony No. 9, D. 944 ("Great")
  - String Quintet in C major, D. 956
- Felix Mendelssohn
  - Wedding March from A Midsummer Night's Dream
- Frédéric Chopin
  - Introduction and Polonaise brillante for cello and piano, Op. 3
  - Etude Op. 10 No. 1 "Waterfall"
  - Etude Op. 10 No. 7 "Toccata"
  - Mazurka Op. 67 No. 3
- Robert Schumann
  - Toccata, Op. 7
  - Fantasie in C, Op. 17
  - Arabeske, Op. 18
  - Symphony No. 2, Op. 61
- Anton Bruckner
  - Te Deum
- Georges Bizet
  - Symphony in C
  - Souvenirs de Rome
- Jean Sibelius
  - Symphony No. 3, Op. 52 (1907)
  - Symphony No. 7, Op. 105 (1924)
- Maurice Ravel: Boléro
- Igor Stravinsky: Symphony in C (1940)
- Sergei Prokofiev
  - Piano Concerto No. 3, Op. 26 (1921)
  - Symphony No. 4 (original version), Op. 47 (1930)
  - Symphony No. 4 (revised version), Op. 112 (1947)
- Dmitri Shostakovich: Symphony No. 7, Op. 60 ("Leningrad")
- Terry Riley: In C
- Duke Ellington: "C Jam Blues"

== See also ==
- Key (music)
- Major and minor
- Chord (music)
- Chord notation

| No. | Flats | | Sharps | |
| No. | Major | minor | Major | minor |
|---|---|---|---|---|
| 0 | C | a | C | a |
| 1 | F | d | G | e |
| 2 | B♭ | g | D | b |
| 3 | E♭ | c | A | f♯ |
| 4 | A♭ | f | E | c♯ |
| 5 | D♭ | b♭ | B | g♯ |
| 6 | G♭ | e♭ | F♯ | d♯ |
| 7 | C♭ | a♭ | C♯ | a♯ |
| 8 | F♭ | d♭ | G♯ | e♯ |
