= Jena Symphony =

The Symphony No. 14 in C major, the so-called Jena Symphony by Friedrich Witt, is a symphony that was at one time attributed to Ludwig van Beethoven. The symphony was discovered by Fritz Stein in 1909 in the archives of a concert society in Jena, from which it derived its name. Stein believed it to be the work of Beethoven and it was so published by Breitkopf und Härtel in 1911. It is now known that the piece was the work of Witt (born the same year as Beethoven).

== History ==
Stein thought it was quite likely an early work by Beethoven and pointed out some stylistic similarities in the preface to the score. From each of the four movements he singled out a few passages he considered especially Beethoven-like. Stein's belief in Beethoven's authorship was strengthened by the fact that Beethoven's letters show that prior to writing his own Symphony No. 1 he tried to write a C major symphony with Joseph Haydn's Symphony No. 97 as a model, and it is easy to find parallels between the Jena Symphony and Haydn's No. 97.

When H. C. Robbins Landon found another copy of the work at the archives of Göttweig Abbey with Witt's name on it, he convinced most other scholars that the work was in fact by Witt. Ralph Leavis, for example, condemned the work as "a piece of plagiarism, put together almost with scissors and paste from reminiscences of Haydn." A second copy under Witt's name was later found at Rudolstadt.

== Analysis ==
In four movements, the symphony is scored for flute, 2 oboes, 2 bassoons, 2 horns in C, 2 trumpets in C, timpani and strings.

The first movement begins with an Adagio introduction of 20 measures. A sonata form movement follows with a mostly triadic first subject group

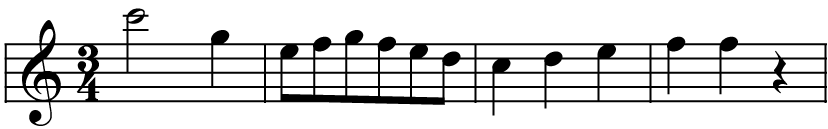

and a more dance-like second subject group.

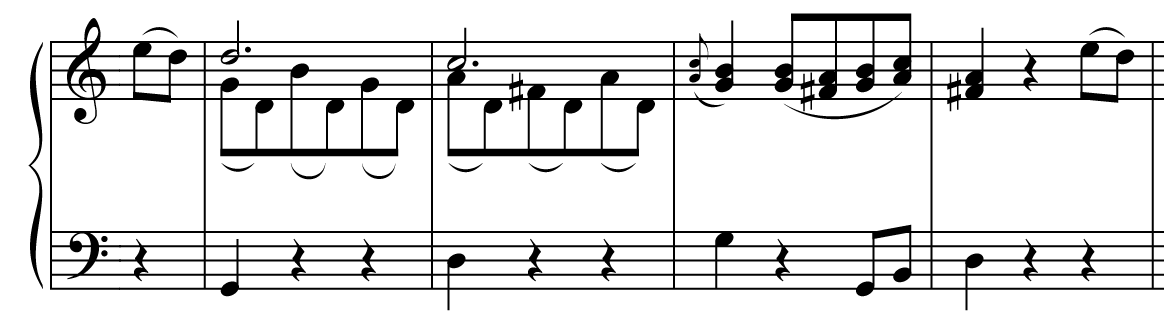

The exposition has a repeat (not always followed in performance). The development of just 30 measures ends with a crescendo leading directly to the recapitulation.

The second movement in F major has a central section in F minor.

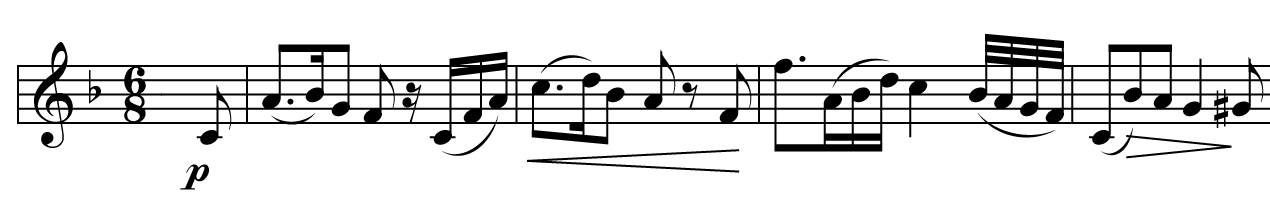

The timpano in C is used in this movement (the timpani were set to C and G for the first movement and are not changed in the course of work).

The third movement is a Minuet with Trio.

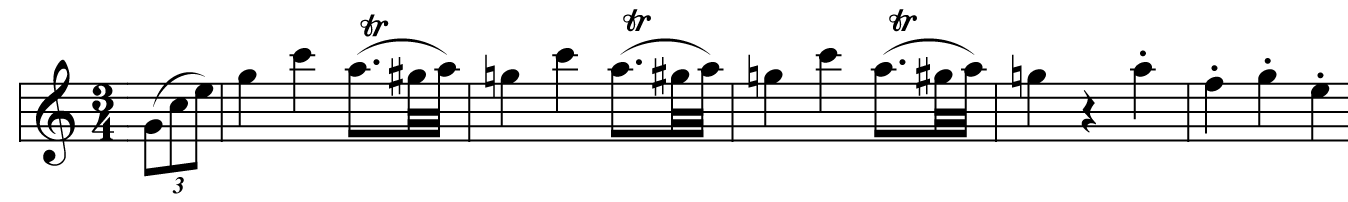

The fourth movement begins piano.

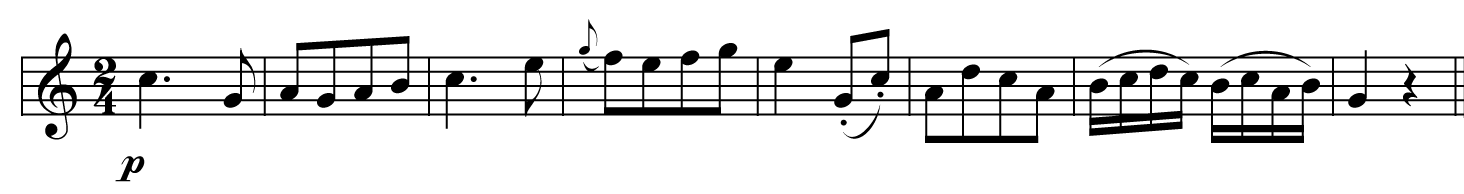

The handling of the winds in this movement led some scholars to believe (before Robbins Landon's discovery) that perhaps this movement was in fact written by Beethoven while the rest was written by an unknown composer.

== Recordings ==
The Jena Symphony has been recorded on:

- LP (33⅓ rpm), on the Turnabout Records label (owned by Vox Records) by the Westphalian Symphony Orchestra conducted by Hubert Reichert (1971, Vox Production). The disc also included Beethoven's Wellington's Victory, Op. 91.
- LP, on the Urania label by the Leipzig Philharmonic conducted by Rolf Kleinert (the disc also included Beethoven's Choral Fantasia, Opus 80).
- LP, on the RCA Camden label by the Janssen Symphony Orchestra of Los Angeles conducted by Werner Janssen (the disc also included Beethoven's Symphony No. 1).
- LP, on the Musical Masterpiece Society label by the Winterthur Symphony Orchestra conducted by Walter Goehr, released in the early 1950s and accredited to Beethoven (the double disc also included Beethoven's Symphony No. 1 and Symphony No. 9).
- CD, issued by BBC Music Magazine in 1995 by the London Mozart Players conducted by Matthias Bamert. The disc also includes Mozart's Symphony No. 34 in C, K. 338, and his German Dances, K. 600.
- CD, on the Naxos label by the Sinfonia Finlandia conducted by Patrick Gallois. The disc also includes the Symphony in A major and the Flute Concerto in G major, Op. 8.
- CD, on the Pool label by the Jena Philharmonic Orchestra conducted by GMD Andreas S. Weiser and was released on April 16, 2002. The disc also includes "Variations and Fugue for Orchestra over a Theme by Wolfgang Amadeus Mozart, op. 132" by Max Reger (distributed by Schimmelpfennig & friends in Berlin, currently available).
- LP, on the Melodiya label by the USSR Radio Symphony Orchestra conducted by Ruben Vartanyan; the LP also included Beethoven's Symphony Nr. 1 in C by Moscow Symphony Orchestra conducted by Rudolf Barshai.
- LP, on the Deutsche Grammophon label (LPE 17 077) by the Sächsische Staatskapelle Dresden conducted by Franz Konwitschny, released in the mid-to-late 1950s and still accredited to Beethoven on the earliest release of the record.
