= Symphony No. 28 (Mozart) =

1773 symphony by W. A. Mozart

- by W. A. Mozart
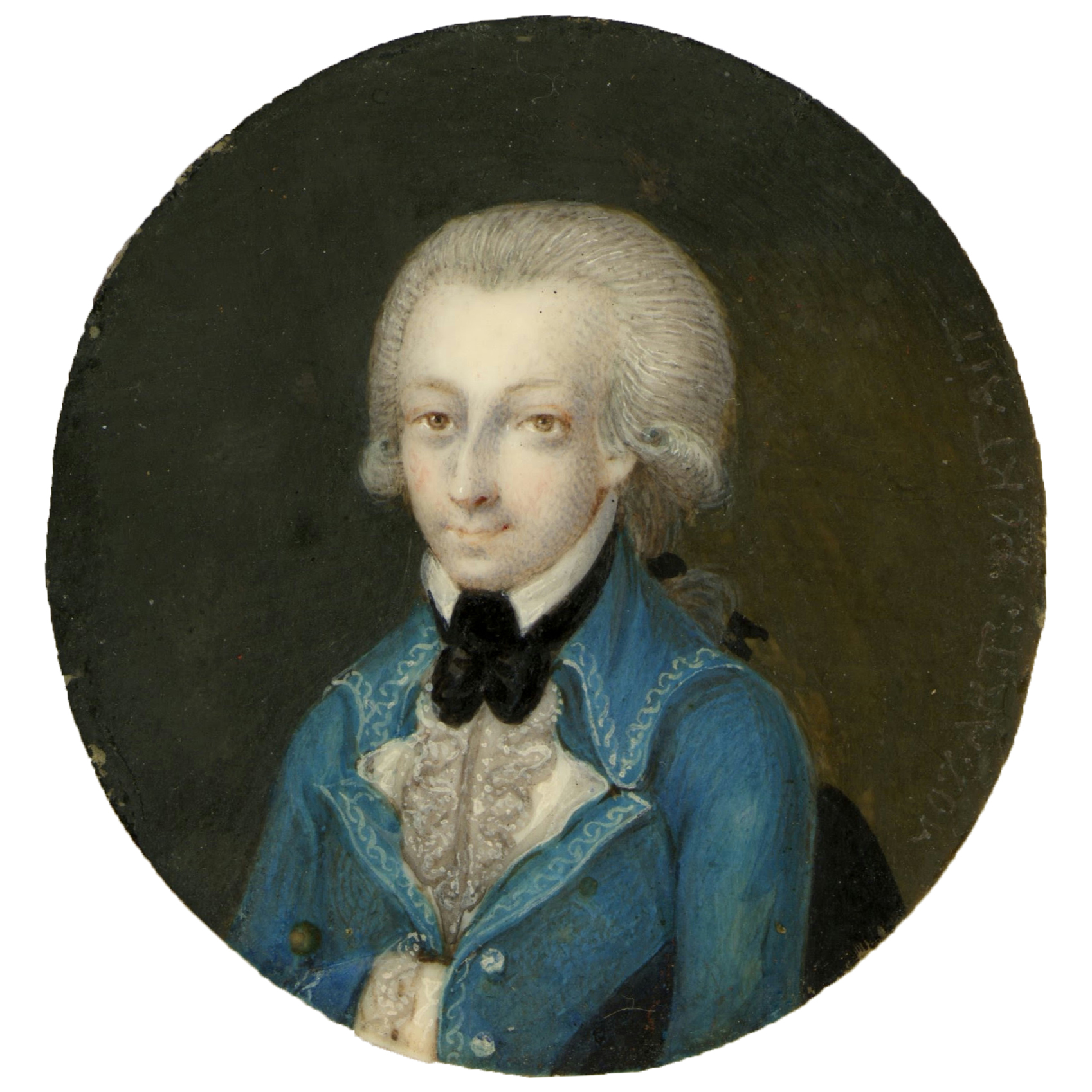
- Mozart in 1773, portrait by Martin Knoller
- Key: C major
- Catalogue: K. 200/189k
- Composed: 1773
- Duration: c. 18 minutes
- Movements: 4
- Scoring: Orchestra

The Symphony No. 28 in C major, K. 200/189k, by Wolfgang Amadeus Mozart is his last piece in the "Salzburg series". The exact date of composition is uncertain because of Mozart's unclear handwriting; the month is clearly November, but the day can be read as 12 or 17, and the year has been read as 1774, but more recent research points to 1773.

The symphony was written early in Mozart's oeuvre, following the example of the twenty-fifth symphony.

== Structure ==
This symphony is scored for 2 oboes; 2 horns in C and F; 2 trumpets in C, silent in the second movement; and strings.

It is written in four movements:

1. Allegro spiritoso, 3/4
2. Andante in F major, 2/4
3. Menuet – Trio, Allegretto 3/4
4. Presto, 2/2
