= Günther Grünsteudel =

German librarian

Günther Grünsteudel (born in 1954) is a German librarian who has become known through his publications on musicology and regional topics concerning Augsburg.

He compiled the Woll-Werke-Verzeichnis (WWV) of the works of composer Erna Woll. In 1998, together with Günter Hägele and Rudolf Frankenberger, he published the Augsburger Stadtlexikon in a substantially revised new edition.

Grünsteudel is a specialist for music and politics at the Universitätsbibliothek Augsburg.

== Publications ==
- Canadiana-Bibliographie. Veröffentlichungen deutschsprachiger Kanadisten 1980–1987. Brockmeyer, Bochum 1989 ISBN 3-88339-703-2. 2nd edition 1993, ISBN 3-8196-0087-6.
- Erna Woll. Ein Werkverzeichnis. Wissner, Augsburg 1996, ISBN 3-89639-025-2.
- with Edwin Michler, Hermann Ullrich: Johann Melchior Dreyer. Ein ostschwäbischer Kirchenmusiker um 1800. Supplement to the concert (28 April) and the exhibition (28 April - 5 May 1996) in the former Cistercian convent of Kirchheim am Ries. Rieser Kulturtage, Nördlingen 1996, ISBN 3-923373-30-9 (online, PDF; 82 kB).
- with Günter Hägele, Rudolf Frankenberger (ed.): Augsburger Stadtlexikon. 2nd edition. Perlach, Augsburg 1998, ISBN 3-922769-28-4 (online).
- Wallerstein. Das schwäbische Mannheim. Booklet accompanying the exhibition of the Augsburg University Library, Wallerstein, Neues Schloß, 1. Juni – 9. Juli 2000. Rieser Kulturtage, Nördlingen 2000, ISBN 3-923373-43-0 (Excerpt).
- Canadiana-Bibliographie 1900–2000. Veröffentlichungen deutschsprachiger Kanadisten. ISL, Hagen 2001, ISBN 3-933842-47-6 (numerized des Zentrums für Kanada-Studien der Universität Trier, 2003, PDF; 1,8 MB).
- Musik für die Synagoge. Universitäts-Bibliothek, Augsburg 2008, ISBN 978-3-936504-03-3.
