= Friedrich Witt =

German composer and cellist

Score of the Symphonie turque by Friedrich Witt, c. 1809

Friedrich Jeremias Witt (8 November 1770 – 3 January 1836) was a German composer and cellist. He is perhaps best known as the likely author of a Symphony in C major known as the Jena Symphony, once attributed to Ludwig van Beethoven.

== Biography ==
Witt was born in 1770, the same year as Beethoven, and was a German composer of considerable stature in his time. He was born in the Württemberg village of Niederstetten, the son of a cantor and court clerk. Witt became a cellist (some accounts say a violinist) in the court orchestra of Oettingen-Wallerstein when he was nineteen, taking composition lessons there with Antonio Rosetti, that is, the Bohemian-born Anton Rösler. Witt was most famous in his lifetime for his oratorio Der leidende Heiland (The Suffering Saviour), securing an appointment as Kapellmeister for the Prince of Würzburg, and later for the theater, where he stayed until his death. He also wrote two operas: Palma (1804) and Das Fischerweib (1806). His other compositions include concertos, church music, chamber music and symphonies. His best-known work, a symphony in C major known as the Jena, is modeled after the Symphony No. 97 by Joseph Haydn. The Haydn connection contributed to the mis-attribution to Beethoven (who mentioned himself trying to write a symphony that fits the description of Jena).

== Works ==
Stephen Fisher compiled a thematic index of Witt's symphonies. The following list of works is based on the 2008 overview compiled by Günther Grünsteudel, which encompasses all of Witt's compositions known to survive in manuscript or print. Grünsteudel reattributed several works formerly assigned to Witt, such as the three Quatuor/Quintetto concertantos (actually by Prince Carl Friedrich zu Löwenstein-Wertheim-Freudenberg) and three piano sonatas (composed by Johann Franz Xaver Sterkel and others).

=== Symphonies ===
Witt wrote a total of 23 symphonies:

- Symphony in C major (1790)
- Symphony in C major (c. 1790)
- Symphony in C major Jena Symphony (composed between 1792 and 1796; formerly attributed to Ludwig van Beethoven)
- Symphony in C major Grand Symphony No. 7 (by 1810/11, published by Johann André)
- Symphony in C minor (1790)
- Symphony in D major (1790)
- Symphony in D major (c. 1790)
- Symphony in D major (c. 1790)
- Symphony in D major (c. 1790)
- Symphony in D major Symphony No. 2 (by 1803/04, published by André)
- Symphony in D major Symphony No. 5 (by 1806/07, published by André)
- Symphony in D minor Grand Symphony No. 9 (by 1817/18, published by André)
- Symphony in E major Grand Symphony No. 8 (by 1810/11, published by André)
- Symphony in E♭ major (c. 1790)
- Symphony in E♭ major (1793)
- Symphony in E♭ major Symphony No. 4 (1799, published by André)
- Symphony in F major (c. 1790)
- Symphony in F major Symphony No. 3 (by 1806, published by André)
- Symphony in G major (c. 1790)
- Symphony in A major (c. 1790). In the finale, Witt cites the French Revolutionary "Ça ira" motif.
- Symphony in A minor Symphonie turque No. 6 (by 1806, published by André)
- Symphony in B♭ major (1790)
- Symphony in B♭ major Symphony No. 1 (by 1802/03, published by André)

=== Solo concertos ===
- Concertino in E♭ major (after 1800)
- Cello Concerto in C major
- Flute Concerto in G major, Op. 8 (by 1806, published by Breitkopf & Härtel)
- Horn Concerto in E major (1795)
- Horn Concerto in E♭ major
- Three concertos in F major for two horns (c. 1797)
- Concertino for two horns in E♭ major (after 1800)
- Various lost concertos for cello, bassoon, flute, oboe, clarinet, and horn

=== Harmoniemusik ===
- Adagio and Allegro in E♭ major (1821)
- Allegretto (c. 1825)
- Concertante in E♭ major (c. 1825)
- Three Concertantes in F major (after 1800 / c. 1825)
- Concertanto in F major (c. 1825)
- Concertino in C major (c. 1825; long attributed to Carl Maria von Weber)
- Concertino in C major (c. 1825)
- Concertino in E♭ major (c. 1825)
- Duetto in F major (c. 1825)
- Minuet in F major (after 1800; variations on Mozart's minuet from Don Giovanni)
- Parthia for winds in E♭ major (1790)
- Parthia for winds in E♭ major (1792)
- Parthia for winds in F major (1790)
- Parthia for winds in F major (1791)
- Parthia Grande d'armonia in E♭ major (c. 1825)
- Sept Pièces d'harmonie (c. 1825)
- Quintet No. 1 in F major (c. 1825)
- Quintet No. 2 in F major (c. 1825)
- Quintet No. 3 in B♭ major Armonia dolorosa (c. 1825)
- Scena in F major (1828)
- Trauermarsch in C minor (c. 1825)
- Variazioni concertanti in F major (c. 1825)
- Six waltzes (c. 1825)
- Waltz for keyed bugle (c. 1825)
- Over twenty Harmoniemusik arrangements of operas and works by Auber, Boieldieu, Cherubini, Mayseder, Meyerbeer, Mozart, Paisiello, Righini, Romberg, Spohr, and Weber.

=== Chamber and piano music ===
- Three Allemandes for piano
- Piano Trio in E♭ major (after 1800)
- Piano Trio in F major (after 1800)
- Piano Trio in B♭ major (after 1800)
- Bassoon Quartet in F major (1803 or later)
- Horn Quartet in E♭ major (1806–1814)
- String Quartet in C major (after 1800)
- Piano Quintet in E♭ major, Op. 6 (by 1806, published by Breitkopf & Härtel)
- Piano Quintet in F major (after 1808; arrangement of the Piano Trio in F major)
- Septet in F major (by 1816/17, published by Schott in 1817)

=== Church music ===
- Libera me in F major (after 1800)
- Mass in C major (c. 1810)
- Mass in D major (c. 1800–1810)
- Mass in E♭ major (after 1800)
- Mass in E♭ major Missa solenne
- Mass in C minor/E♭ major Missa solenne (1829)
- Mass in B♭ major Missa solenne (c. 1810)
- Mass in B♭ major Missa solenne
- Pange Lingua in D major (1793)
- Requiem in E♭ major (after 1800)

=== Secular vocal works ===
- Die Auferstehung Jesu, cantata (by 1793/94)
- Deutscher Gruß an Deutsche for male choir
- Kantate zum Beschluss des 18. Jahrhunderts (1800/01; only libretto survives)
- Der leidende Heiland, oratorio (1801/02; lost)
- Lobsinget Jehova, unserem Gott, cantata (1800)
- Marche en parade
- Der Mensch, cantata (c. 1810; only libretto survives)
- Was ist es, das so verworren, recitative and aria (1811)

=== Operas and stage works ===
- Berissa, heroic-comic opera in three acts
- Das Fischerweib, rustic-comic opera in two acts (premiered on 29 March 1807 in Würzburg; lost)
- Jolantha, Königin von Jerusalem, incidental music (premiered on 11 January 1807 in Würzburg; lost)
- Lenardo und Blandine, incidental music (premiered on 6 August 1813 in Würzburg; lost)
- Palma, singspiel in two acts (premiered in 1804 in Frankfurt; lost)

=== Discography ===
- Symphonies Nos. 6 and 9, Flute Concerto. Hamburg Symphony Orchestra, Johannes Moesus. MDG 329 1299-2
- Septet in F major. Berlin Philharmonic Octet. Berlin Classics. Disc includes Beethoven's Opus 20 Septet.
- Horn Concertos. Concerto Amsterdam. Arts Music. Disc includes horn concertos by Leopold Mozart, Pokorny and Rosetti.
- Quintet for Piano and Winds. James Campbell, James Mason, James Sommerville, James McKay, Anton Kuerti. Cbc Musica Viva. Disc includes piano and wind quintets by Mozart (K. 452), and Beethoven (Op. 16).
- Symphonies in C major and A major, Flute Concerto in G major, Op. 8. Sinfonia Finlandia Jyväskylä, Patrick Gallois Flute and conductor. Naxos 8.572089
- Chamber Works for Winds & Strings. Consortium Classicum. Disc includes quintet by Prince von Löwenstein-Wertheim-Freudenberg Carl Friedrich

== Sources ==
- Fisher, Stephen (1983). Friedrich Witt (1770–1836), Anton Eberl (1765–1807), symphonic works: thematic index. Unknown, possibly Garland Publishing. OCLC 475343768.
- Greene, David Mason (1985). Greene's Biographical Encyclopedia of Composers. Reproducing Piano Roll Fnd. ISBN 0-385-14278-1.
- University of Innsbruck (2009). "Konzertflyer" (PDF). uibk.ac.at (in German).
- Weber-Gesellschaft (2015). "Diskographie der Kompositionen von Carl Maria von Weber" (PDF). webergesellschaft.de (in German).
- Grünsteudel, Günther (2008). "Friedrich Witt (1770–1836) – eine Übersicht über sein Schaffen" (PDF). Musik in Bayern (in German). 71: 109–128.
- Buja, Maureen (4 July 2022). "How Beethoven Lost a Symphony: Friedrich Witt: Jena Symphony". Interlude.
