= Symphony No. 16 (Mozart) =

1772 symphony by W. A. Mozart

- by W. A. Mozart
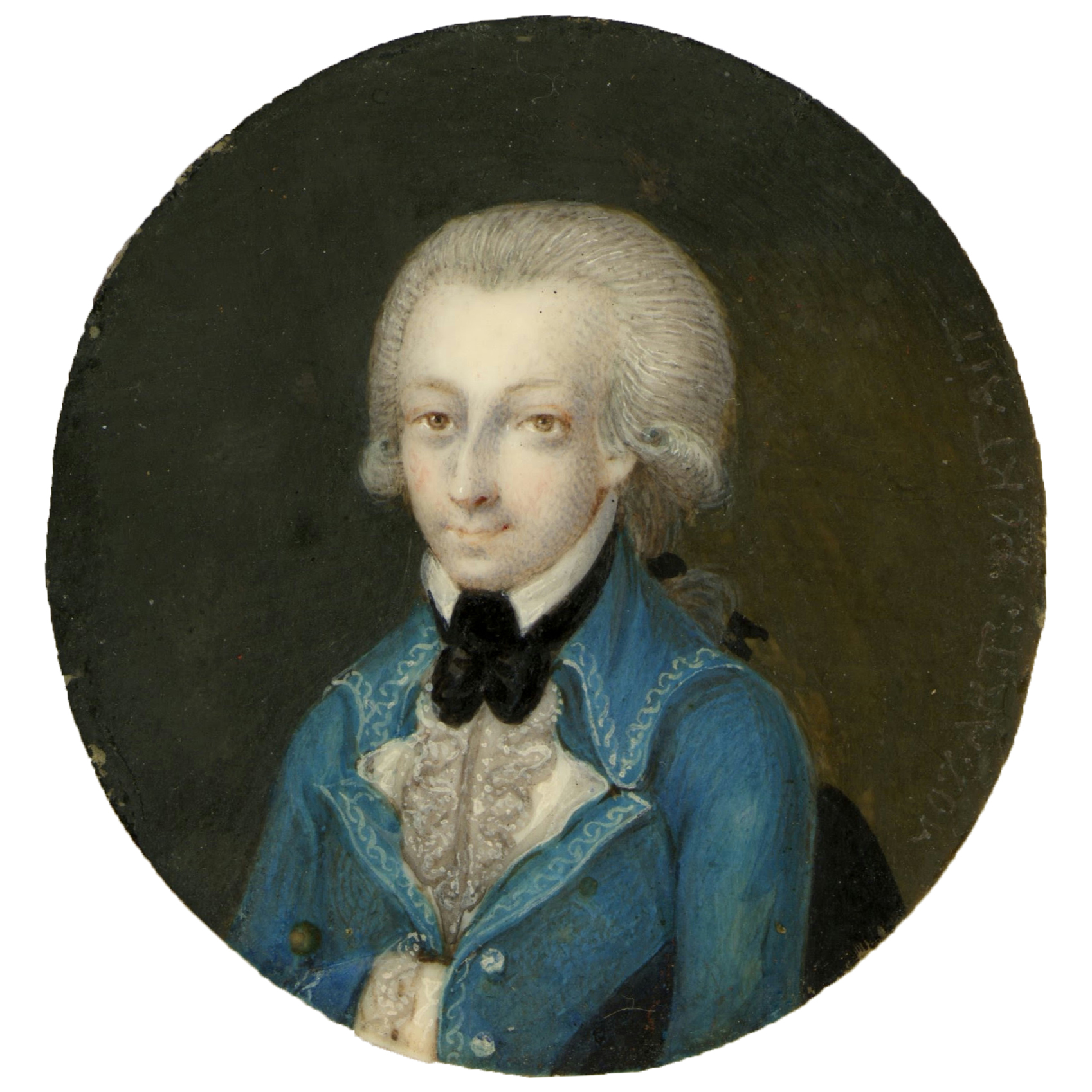
- Mozart in 1773, portrait by Martin Knoller
- Key: C major
- Catalogue: K. 128
- Composed: May 1772
- Duration: c. 12 minutes
- Movements: 3
- Scoring: Orchestra

Symphony No. 16 in C major, K. 128, was the first of three symphonies composed by Wolfgang Amadeus Mozart in May 1772 when Mozart was sixteen years old. This symphony is one of many written during the period in which Mozart stayed in Salzburg, between two trips to Italy. The autograph of the score is preserved in the Berlin State Library.

== Structure ==
The symphony has the basic scoring of two oboes, two horns in C, and strings.

The form is that of a standard three-movement Italian overture:

1. Allegro maestoso, 3/4
2. Andante grazioso, 2/4 G major
3. Allegro, 6/8

The first movement, which a C major essay in sonata form, sounds at first to be in 9/8 due to the presence of triplets. However, as it enters the second half of the exposition section it becomes clear that the movement's meter is actually 3/4. The development section is short, but filled with dense modulations. Some of this developmental spirit carries over into recapitulation, which turns out not to be perfectly literal.

The oboes and horns drop out of the second movement, which is another essay in sonata form, written for the strings alone. They return, however, for the third movement, in C major, which is a cheerful dance cast in an altered rondo form, with a coda.
