= Symphony No. 7 (Haydn) =

Symphony by Joseph Haydn

- Le midi
- by Joseph Haydn
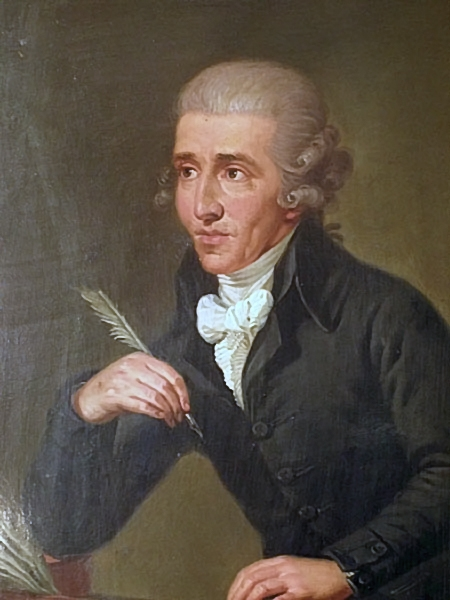
- Portrait of Joseph Haydn, ca. 1770
- Key: C major
- Catalogue: Hob. I:7
- Composed: May/June 1761
- Dedication: Paul II Anton Esterházy
- Duration: c. 20 minutes
- Movements: 4
- Scoring: Orchestra

Premiere
- Date: 1761
- Location: Vienna
- Conductor: Joseph Haydn
- Performers: Prince Esterházy’s court orchestra

The Symphony No. 7 in C major, Hoboken I/7, is a symphony by Joseph Haydn, sometimes called Le midi, meaning "The Noon."

The symphony was composed in May or June 1761, paired together with the other two of the Day Trilogy, Nos. 6 and 8, and under the patronage of Prince Paul II Anton Esterházy.

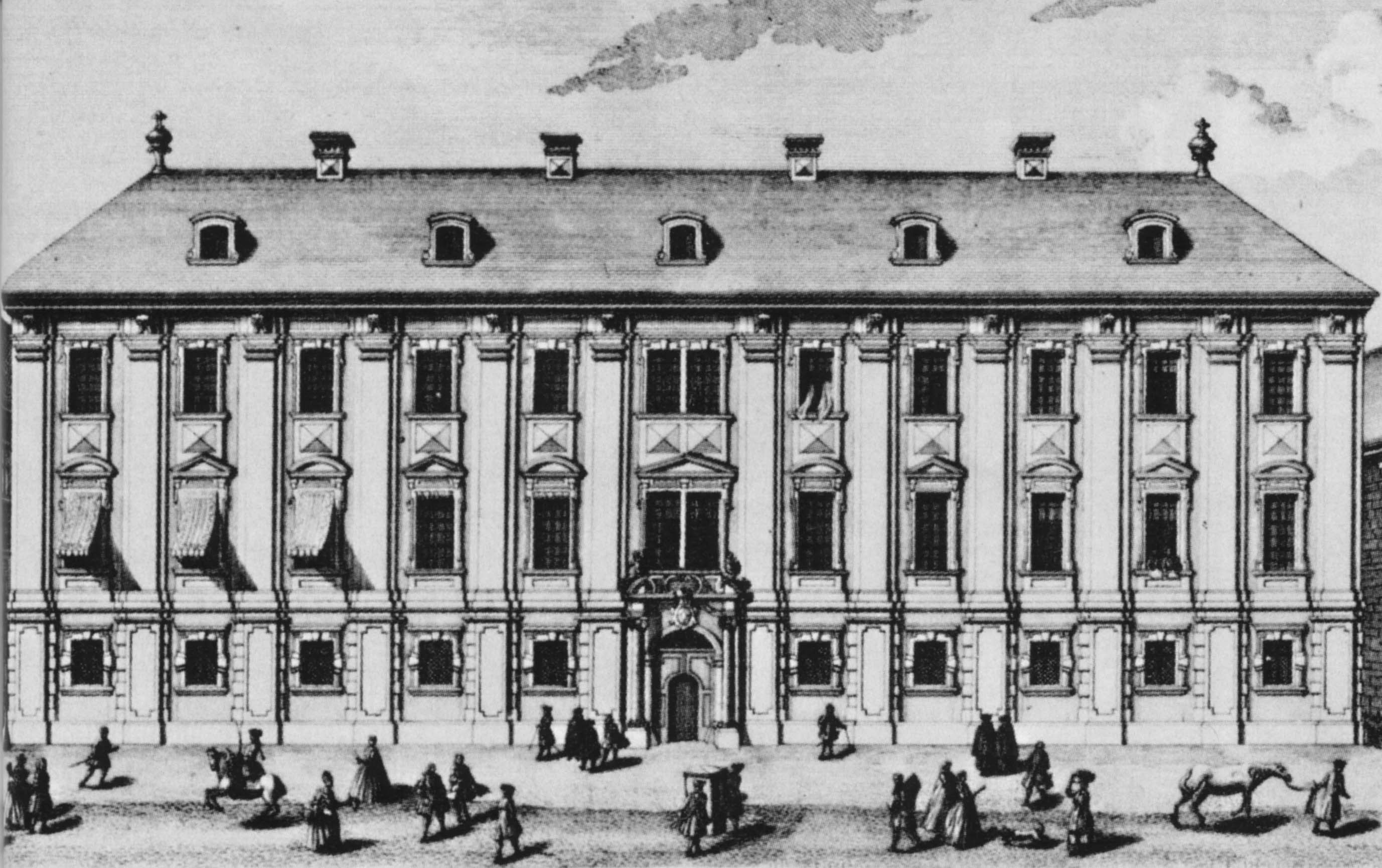
The Esterházy Palace on Vienna's Wallnerstraße, where this symphony premiered.

== Music ==
It is scored for two flutes, two oboes, bassoon, two horns, strings, and continuo, and exhibits many concertante features; indeed, the principal players of each of the string sections have solos, while the winds are given fairly difficult parts.

The work is in four movements:

1. Adagio, 4/4 – Allegro, 3/4
2. Recitativo: Adagio in G major,4/4
3. Menuetto and Trio, 3/4
4. Finale: Allegro, 4/4

Unlike the sunrise of Le matin, the slow introduction to the opening movement here is a ceremonial march.

The first movement begins with a fanfare style, ten bar passage in C major, followed by the allegro part of the movement in D major. The second andante movement begins with an extended "recitative" in C minor featuring a solo violin, which ends in B minor to give way for the main Adagio section. The Adagio follows in G major with solo violin and solo cello with prominent obbligato flute parts coloring the accompanying orchestration. The movement ends with an extended cadenza for the solo violin and cello.

As is the case with symphonies 6 and 8, the double bass has an extensive solo in the trio of the menuet. Like the previous symphony, the finale contains passages for almost all the instruments, but here it is intensified even more with solos and tuttis often exchanging every other bar. The recapitulation is notably accentuated with horn fanfares.
