= Symphony No. 3 (Rimsky-Korsakov) =

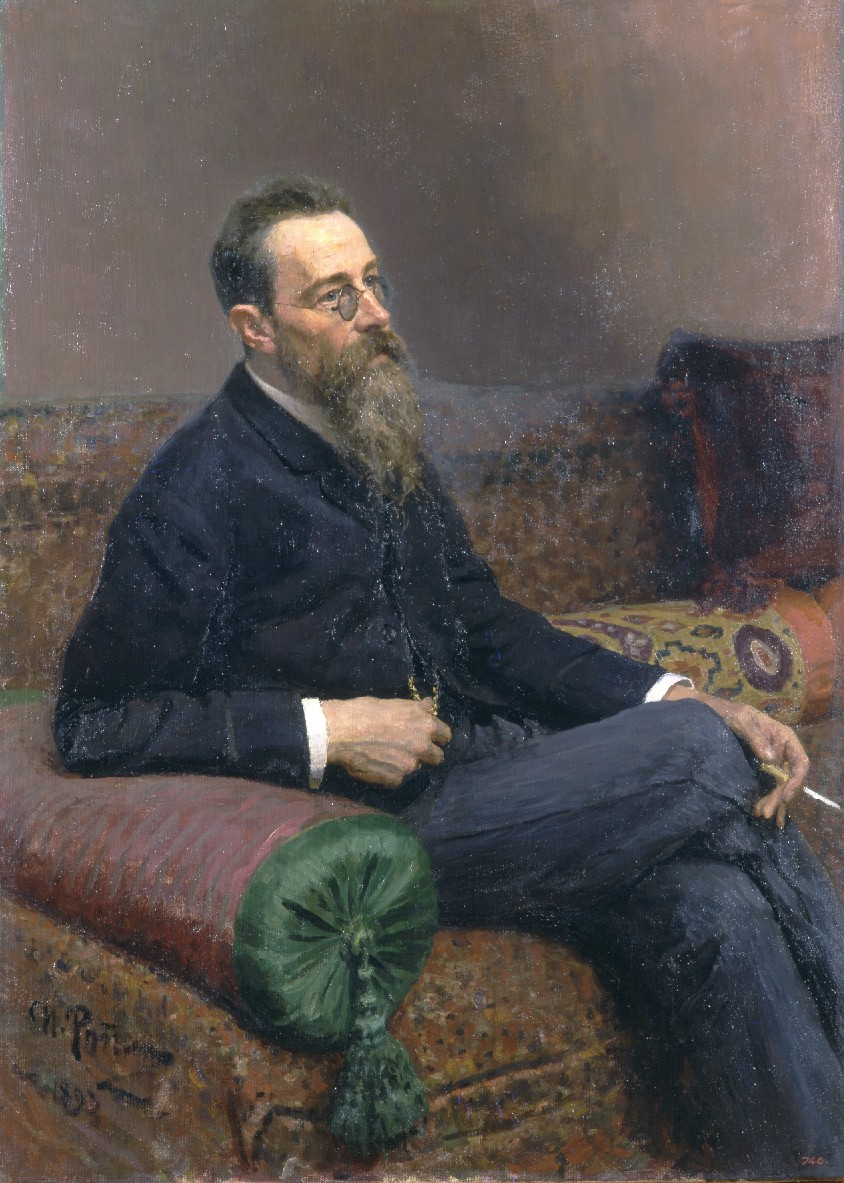
Portrait of Rimsky-Korsakov by Ilya Repin

Symphony No. 3 in C major, Op. 32, was composed by Nikolai Rimsky-Korsakov between 1866 and 1873, and revised in 1886.

Rimsky-Korsakov composed his Third Symphony between 1866 and 1873. It premiered in St. Petersburg in 1874, and, despite praise from César Cui, was received indifferently by the audience. Tchaikovsky heard it subsequently, and described it as too academic. The composer himself considered it weak in some parts, and in 1886, he revised it, having done the same with his First Symphony. With the benefit of hindsight and composing experience, the first movement became about three minutes longer; the other movements also saw changes. It was published in 1888.

== Music ==
The symphony is scored for two flutes, two oboes, two clarinets, two bassoons, four horns, two trumpets, three trombones, one tuba, timpani, and strings.

It is divided into four movements; the second movement is in 5/4.:

1866–73 version:

1. Andante tranquillo – Allegro con brio
2. Scherzo. Vivace
3. Andante
4. Allegro con molto

1886 version:

1. Moderata assai - Allegro
2. Scherzo: Vivo – Trio: Moderata
3. Andante
4. Allegro con spirito
