= Symphony in C major (Wagner) =

Symphony composed by Richard Wagner

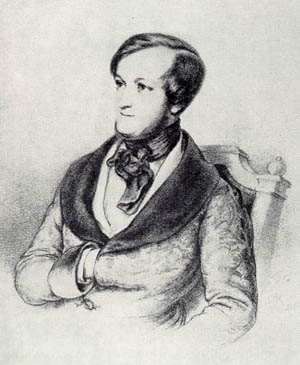
Richard Wagner c. 1840, by Ernest Benedikt Kietz

The Symphony in C major, WWV 29, from 1832 is the only completed symphony of Richard Wagner.

Wagner also started in 1834 an incomplete symphony in E major (WWV 35), of which only the first movement and part of the second movement exist. The symphony was heavily influenced by Beethoven’s symphonies from its form and orchestration.

== Form ==
The Symphony in C major is in four movements:

1. Sostenuto e maestoso – Allegro con brio (475 bars)
2. Andante ma non troppo, un poco maestoso (208 bars)
3. Allegro assai (447 bars)
4. Allegro molto e vivace (442 bars)

The performance time is approximately 35 minutes.

=== I. Sostenuto e maestoso – Allegro con brio ===
The first movement is in sonata form movement prefaced by a slow introduction.

=== II. Andante ma non troppo, un poco maestoso ===
The second movement is in the key of A minor; the overall shape is A + B + B + A + coda, a strong contrast existing between the lyrical A and the signal-like B ideas. The movement begins with a motif from the coda of the first movement.

=== III. Allegro assai ===
The third movement is a scherzo and trio with the traditional structure A + B + A + B + A + coda. The scherzo is characterised by a dynamic rhythm, whilst the trio (un poco meno allegro) features a contrasting smooth melodic line.

=== IV. Allegro molto e vivace ===
The fourth movement is structured in the same classical sonata form as the opening movement. The idea which follows the presentation of the first theme is equivocal in tonality. Wagner accelerates the tempo (più allegro) halfway through the coda to generate increased excitement as the music moves towards its close.

== Instrumentation ==
The symphony is scored for 2 flutes, 2 oboes, 2 clarinets in C, 2 bassoons, contrabassoon, 4 horns in C, 2 trumpets in C, 3 trombones, timpani, and strings.

== Composition ==
According to Wagner himself, in a letter to a friend, he composed the symphony in the brief space of six weeks at the beginning of the summer of 1832. The composition shows the influence of the symphonies of Ludwig van Beethoven (especially nos. 3, 5 and 7) and also of the late symphonies of Mozart. The orchestration is in the style of Weber and Beethoven. According to Emanuel Overbeeke the work shows the composer's inexperience (he was 19 years old when writing it), in particular in the so-called diffuseness of the first and second movements. For John Deathridge, on the other hand, the symphony, albeit unoriginal in its Beethovenian style, evinces a technical assurance proving the ability of its young author.

== Early performances ==
The symphony was performed in rehearsal by a student orchestra at the Prague Conservatory in November 1832, conducted by Dionys Weber, with Wagner in attendance. It received its first public performance on 15 December, at the Euterpe music society in Leipzig, conducted by Wagner's early teacher, Christian Gottlieb Müller. Clara Wieck described the performance in a letter to her future husband Robert Schumann dated 17 December 1832:

Father Friedrich Wieck went to the Euterpe hall on Saturday. Listen! Herr Wagner has got ahead of you; a symphony of his was performed, which is said to be as like as two peas to Beethoven's Symphony in A major.

The second public performance was at the Leipzig Gewandhaus on 10 January 1833, as part of the annual subscription concerts. The work received another performance at Würzburg on 27 August 1833.

The score was subsequently thought to have been lost after Wagner presented it to Felix Mendelssohn in 1836 (see below), but the parts from the Prague performance were found in Dresden in 1877 in a trunk which had been left behind by Wagner when he fled the city in 1849. The work was performed again at Christmas 1882, two months before Wagner's death, for the birthday of Wagner's wife Cosima at the La Fenice theatre in Venice; it was conducted by Wagner and by Engelbert Humperdinck. Wagner made several revisions to the full score for the performance. In a subsequent "Essay on the Revival of Youthful Works" he wrote: "If there is anything at all in this work which shows the mark of Richard Wagner, it is the fact that it is not polluted by the hypocritical stance which was to appear later and which Germans find very difficult to get the better of, and the fact that, from the outset, he remained true to himself and was unwilling to be deflected from his proper course."

== Mendelssohn and Wagner's Symphony ==
The same 1882 essay contains a passage in which Wagner implies that Mendelssohn had tried to deliberately suppress the Symphony. The score had in fact been given by Wagner to Mendelssohn as a gift, as is demonstrable from a letter written by Wagner on 11 April 1836; Wagner perhaps had a grievance that Mendelssohn had not subsequently conducted it. In 1874 Wagner told Cosima that he thought Mendelssohn had destroyed the score "perhaps because he detected in it a talent which was disagreeable to him." This invention was of a piece with Wagner's antisemitic attitude to Mendelssohn.

== Piano duet version ==
Fragments exist of a piano duet version of the Symphony in Wagner's hand, probably prepared in 1832 or 1833. Most of the first movement is in the Stefan Zweig Collection at the British Library; other movements are at the Library of Congress in Washington DC.
