= Italian overture =

Opening orchestral music for operas, operettas and other large scale works

The Italian overture is a piece of orchestral music which opened several operas, oratorios and other large-scale works in the late 17th and early 18th centuries.

An Italian overture typically has a three-movement structure – the outer movements are quick, the middle movement is slow.

This type of overture was particularly popular among Italian composers such as Alessandro Scarlatti, and in the early 18th century would usually be called sinfonia. Later, to avoid confusion with other types of sinfonia/symphony, the term Italian overture was used more frequently.

The structure of the Italian overture/sinfonia was the base from which the classical multi-movement cycle - used in genres including the symphony, concerto, and sonata - developed around the middle of the 18th century. For more about the (18th century) relationship between Italian overtures, other types of overtures (e.g. the French overture) and early symphonies, see sinfonia.
