= Symphony in C (Stravinsky) =

Musical work composed by Igor Stravinsky

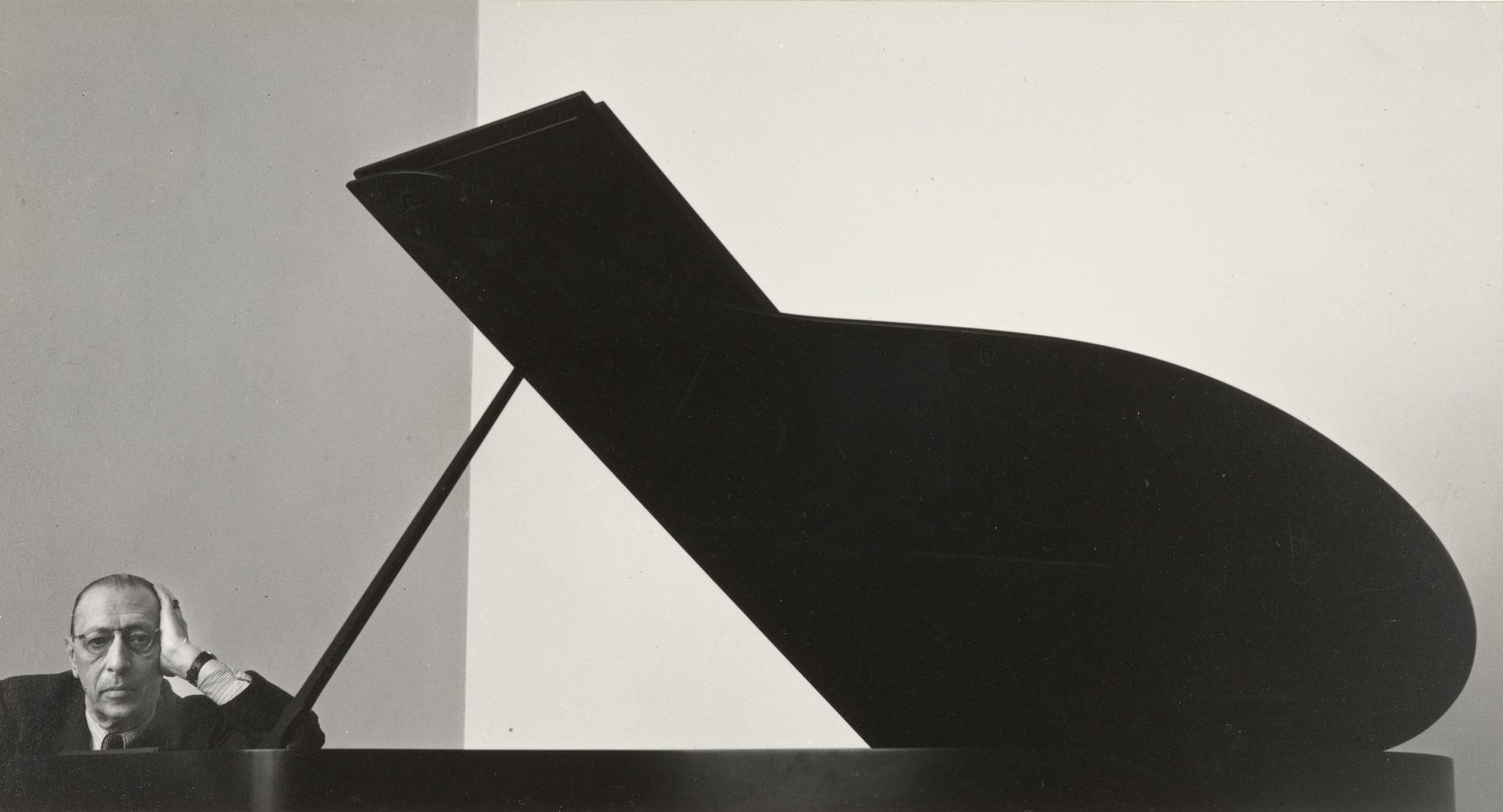
Photograph of Igor Stravinsky by Arnold Newman

The Symphony in C is an orchestral work by Russian expatriate composer Igor Stravinsky. The Symphony in C had been infrequently performed in the composer's lifetime; Stravinsky noted that for several years he was the only person conducting the work.

== Background ==
The Symphony was written between 1938 and 1940 on a commission from American philanthropist Mrs. Mildred Barnes Bliss. It was a turbulent period of the composer's life, marked by illness and deaths in his immediate family. In 1937, Stravinsky was diagnosed with tuberculosis, which had already forced his wife and two daughters to a sanatorium in Switzerland. Stravinsky's daughter Ludmilla and wife Yekaterina died of their illnesses in November 1938 and March 1939, respectively, followed by Stravinsky's own quarantine and the death of his mother Anna in June 1939.

Stravinsky was still mourning the deaths of his family members when World War II forced him to leave Europe. He had written the symphony's first two movements in France and Switzerland. Stravinsky wrote the third movement in Cambridge, Massachusetts, and the fourth movement in Hollywood, after his emigration to the United States. The symphony was premiered by the Chicago Symphony Orchestra under Stravinsky on November 7, 1940.

Stravinsky disclaimed any link between his personal experiences and the symphony's content.

== Music ==
The Symphony in C is representative of Stravinsky's neoclassical period, which had been launched by his ballet Pulcinella (1919–20), the opera Mavra (1921–22), and Octet for winds (1922–23). It is scored for an orchestra consisting of two flutes, piccolo (doubling third flute), two oboes, two clarinets, two bassoons, four horns, two trumpets, three trombones, tuba, timpani, and strings.

The symphony has a traditional, four-movement structure and lasts approximately 30 minutes:

1. Moderato alla breve (about 9 minutes)
2. Larghetto concertante (about 6 minutes)
3. Allegretto (about 5 minutes)
4. Largo; Tempo giusto, alla breve (about 7 minutes)

The Symphony in C is entirely abstract and seems a retreat into the "pure music" styles of Bach, Beethoven, and Haydn. Regarding its style, Stravinsky acknowledged a division of the symphony into halves. The first two movements, composed in Europe, use more traditional rhythmic patterns and harmonizations. The last two movements use frequent modulations of rhythm and are much more chromatic.

== Adaptation ==
The work was choreographed by Martha Graham in the late 1980s. She named the result "Persephone" in ironic reference to another major work by Stravinsky. Although Graham choreographed all four movements, only the three-movement version was performed on stage.
