= List of solo piano compositions by Joseph Haydn =

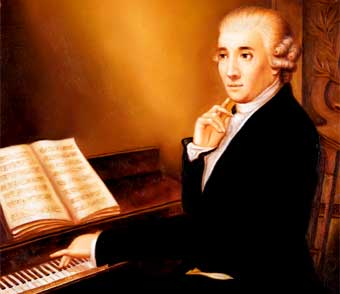
Joseph Haydn

This is a list of solo piano pieces by Joseph Haydn.

== Piano sonatas ==
Two numbering schemes for the sonatas are commonly used. Here, the pieces are sorted using the numbering method proposed by Christa Landon, while the "Hob. XVI" specification refers to its index in the Hoboken catalogue.

Landon	Hob. XVI	Key	Date	Notes
1	8	G major		Uncertain
2	7	C major	1766	Uncertain
3	9	F major	1758	Uncertain
4	G1	G major		Doubtful
5	11	G major	1767	Uncertain; contains movements apparently derived from other works
6	10	C major	1767	Uncertain
7	XVII/D1	D major		Doubtful
8	5	A major	1750–55	Uncertain
9	4	D major	1765	
10	1	C major	1750–55	
11	2	B♭ major	1760	
12	12	A major	1767	Uncertain
13	6	G major	1766	
14	3	C major	1765	
15	13	E major	1767	Uncertain
16	14	D major	1767	Uncertain
17	Es2	E♭ major	1750–1766??	Doubtful
18	Es3	E♭ major	1750–1766??	Doubtful; possibly composed by Mariano Romano Kayser
19	47	E minor	1765–67	Different version of L. 57; does not contain Moderato movement of L. 57; only the minuet is exclusive to L. 19.
20	18	B♭ major	1771–73	
21	2a	D minor		Lost
22	2b	A major		Lost
23	2c	B major		Lost
24	2d	B♭ major		Lost
25	2e	E minor		Lost
26	2g	C major		Lost
27	2h	A major		Lost
	15	C major		Uncertain; arrangement of the Divertimento in C, Hob. II/11
	16	E♭ major		Uncertain
	17	B♭ major		Spurious; by Johann Gottfried Schwanenberger
28	XIV/5	D major		Incompletely preserved
29	45	E♭ major	1766	
30	19	D major	1767	
31	46	A♭ major	1767–70	The second movement is in D flat Major, which is very rare in Classical-era compositions. Haydn only wrote this key.
32	44	G minor	1771–73	
33	20	C minor	1771	The first of Haydn’s keyboard works to be conceived with the dynamic contrasts only possible with a touch sensitive keyboard e.g. clavichord or fortepiano rather than harpsichord. Published 1780 in Vienna by Artaria as one of a set of 6 sonatas dedicated to Katherina & Marianna Auenbrugger
34	33	D major	1773	Published 1783 in London in unauthorized edition by Beardmore & Birchall
35	43	A♭ major	c.1773	Published 1783 in London
36	21	C major	1773	For Prince Nicholas Esterhazy. Published 1774 in Vienna by Kurzböck as part of 6 sonatas Op. 13
37	22	E major	1773	For Prince Nicholas Esterhazy. Published 1774 in Vienna by Kurzböck as part of 6 sonatas Op. 13
38	23	F major	1773	For Prince Nicholas Esterhazy. Published 1774 in Vienna by Kurzböck as part of 6 sonatas Op. 13
39	24	D major	1773	For Prince Nicholas Esterhazy. Published 1774 in Vienna by Kurzböck as part of 6 sonatas Op. 13
40	25	E♭ major	1773	For Prince Nicholas Esterhazy. Published 1774 in Vienna by Kurzböck as part of 6 sonatas Op. 13
41	26	A major	1773	For Prince Nicholas Esterhazy. Published 1774 in Vienna by Kurzböck as part of 6 sonatas Op. 13
42	27	G major	1774–76	
43	28	E♭ major	1774–76	
44	29	F major	1774	
45	30	A major	1774–76	
46	31	E major	1774–76	
47	32	B minor	1774–76	This is the only sonata whose second movement is in B Major.
48	35	C major	1780	Published 1780 in Vienna by Artaria as one of a set of 6 sonatas dedicated to Katherina & Marianna Auenbrugger
49	36	C♯ minor	1780	Published 1780 in Vienna by Artaria as one of a set of 6 sonatas dedicated to Katherina & Marianna Auenbrugger Only piano composition that is written in this key. The minuet also contains C# Major section, which is exceptionally rare in Classical-era compositions.
50	37	D major	1780	Published 1780 in Vienna by Artaria as one of a set of 6 sonatas dedicated to Katherina & Marianna Auenbrugger
51	38	E♭ major	1780	Published 1780 in Vienna by Artaria as one of a set of 6 sonatas dedicated to Katherina & Marianna Auenbrugger
52	39	G major	1780	Published 1780 in Vienna by Artaria as one of a set of 6 sonatas dedicated to Katherina & Marianna Auenbrugger
53	34	E minor	c.1778 or 1783	Published 1783 in London in unauthorized edition by Beardmore & Birchall
54	40	G major	1784	Published 1784 in Vienna by Bossler
55	41	B♭ major	1784	Published 1784 in Vienna by Bossler. This is the only sonatas whose second section of the 2nd movement is in B flat minor, which is extremely rare in classical era compositions.
56	42	D major	1784	Published 1784 in Vienna by Bossler
57	47	F major	1788	Different version of L. 19. The minuet is not included in L. 57. Authorship of the Moderato is uncertain.
58	48	C major	1789	Published 1789 in Leipzig by Breifkopf
59	49	E♭ major	1789-90	
60	50	C major	1794	Composed in London
61	51	D major	1794	Composed in London
62	52	E♭ major	1794	Composed in London. This is the only sonata whose second movement is a remote key instead of a typical B flat or A flat Major.

== Piano pieces ==
These works are in Category XVII of the Hoboken catalogue.

- Capriccio in G major on "Acht Sauschneider müssen sein", Hob. XVII/1
- Twenty Variations in G major, Hob. XVII/2
- Arietta con 12 Variazioni, Hob. XVII/3
- Fantasia (Capriccio) in C major, Hob. XVII/4 (1789)
- Variations (6) in C major, Hob. XVII/5 (1790)
- Variations in F minor, Un piccolo divertimento, Hob. XVII/6 (1793)
- Variations (5) in D major, Hob. XVII/7
- Variations (8) in D major, Hob. XVII/8 (uncertain)
- Adagio in F major, Hob. XVII/9
- Allegretto in G major, Hob. XVII/10 (uncertain; arrangement of the Allegretto in G, Hob. XIX/27)
- Andante in C major, Hob. XVII/11 (uncertain)
- Andante con variazioni (4) in B♭ major, Hob. XVII/12 (uncertain)

== See also ==
- List of concertos by Joseph Haydn
- List of masses by Joseph Haydn
- List of operas by Joseph Haydn
- List of piano trios by Joseph Haydn
- List of string quartets by Joseph Haydn
- List of symphonies by Joseph Haydn
- Hoboken catalogue
