= Piano Sonata Hob. XVI/49 =

Piano piece by Joseph Haydn

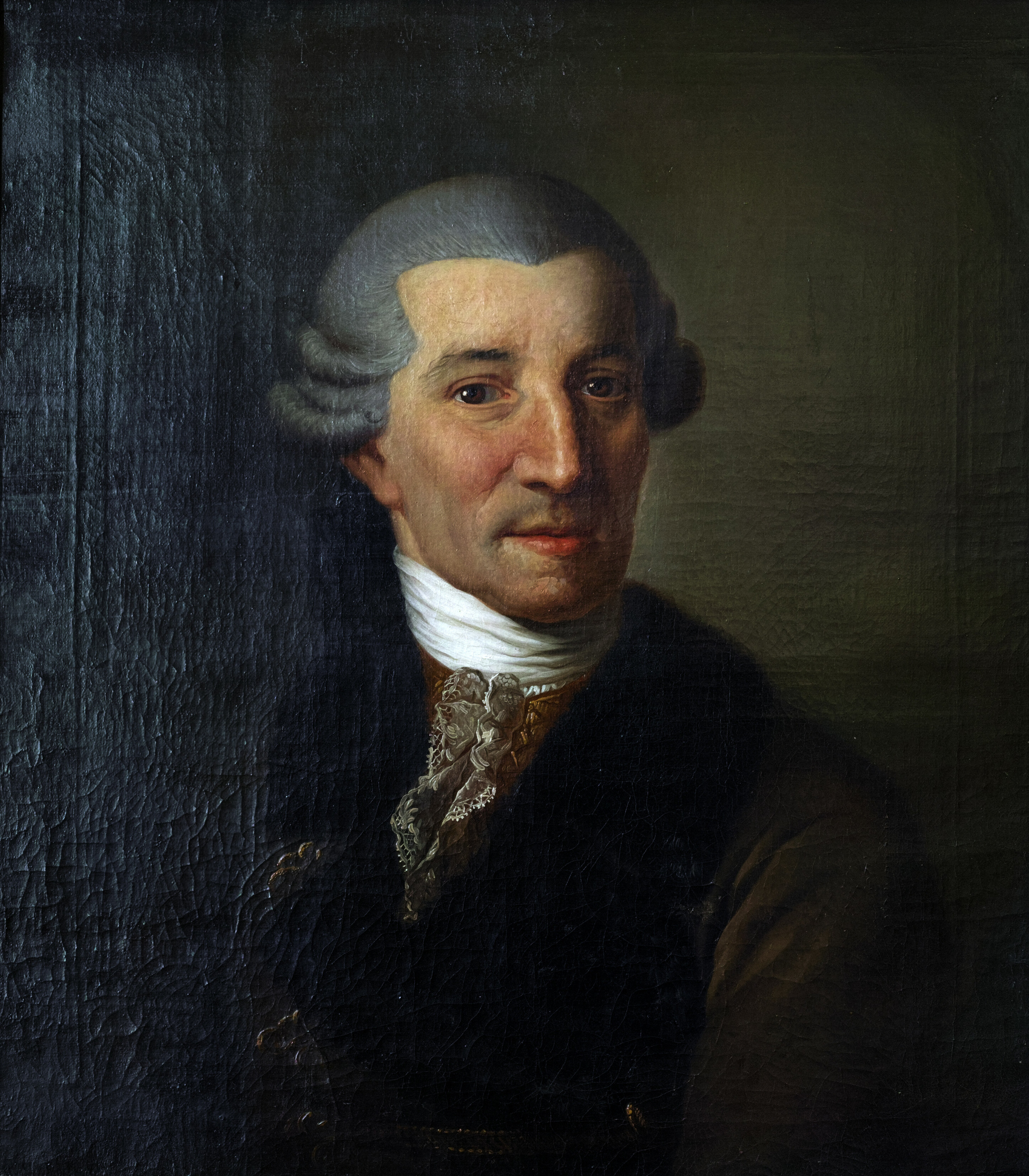
Detail of a portrait of Joseph Haydn by Ludwig Seehas from 1785, in the Staatliches Museum Schwerin. No portrait of Maria Anna von Genzinger, for whom he wrote the sonata, survives.

The Piano Sonata in E♭ major, Hob. XVI/49, L.59, was written in 1789/90 by Joseph Haydn. The sonata stands out among Haydn's pianoforte works both for the enthusiastic reaction it has evoked from critics and for the rather complicated story behind its genesis, driven by the composer's feelings for a younger, married woman he had befriended.

== Structure ==
This work has three movements. Each is in 3/4, a time signature sequence unique in Haydn's keyboard sonatas.

1. Allegro non troppo (5–6 minutes)
2. Adagio cantabile (B♭ major and minor) (7–9 minutes)
3. Finale: Tempo di Menuet (4–5 minutes)

The first and the third movement were written in 1789, with the second movement a later addition. The autograph score of the complete work bears the date June 1, 1790.

== Composition history ==
=== Backdrop ===
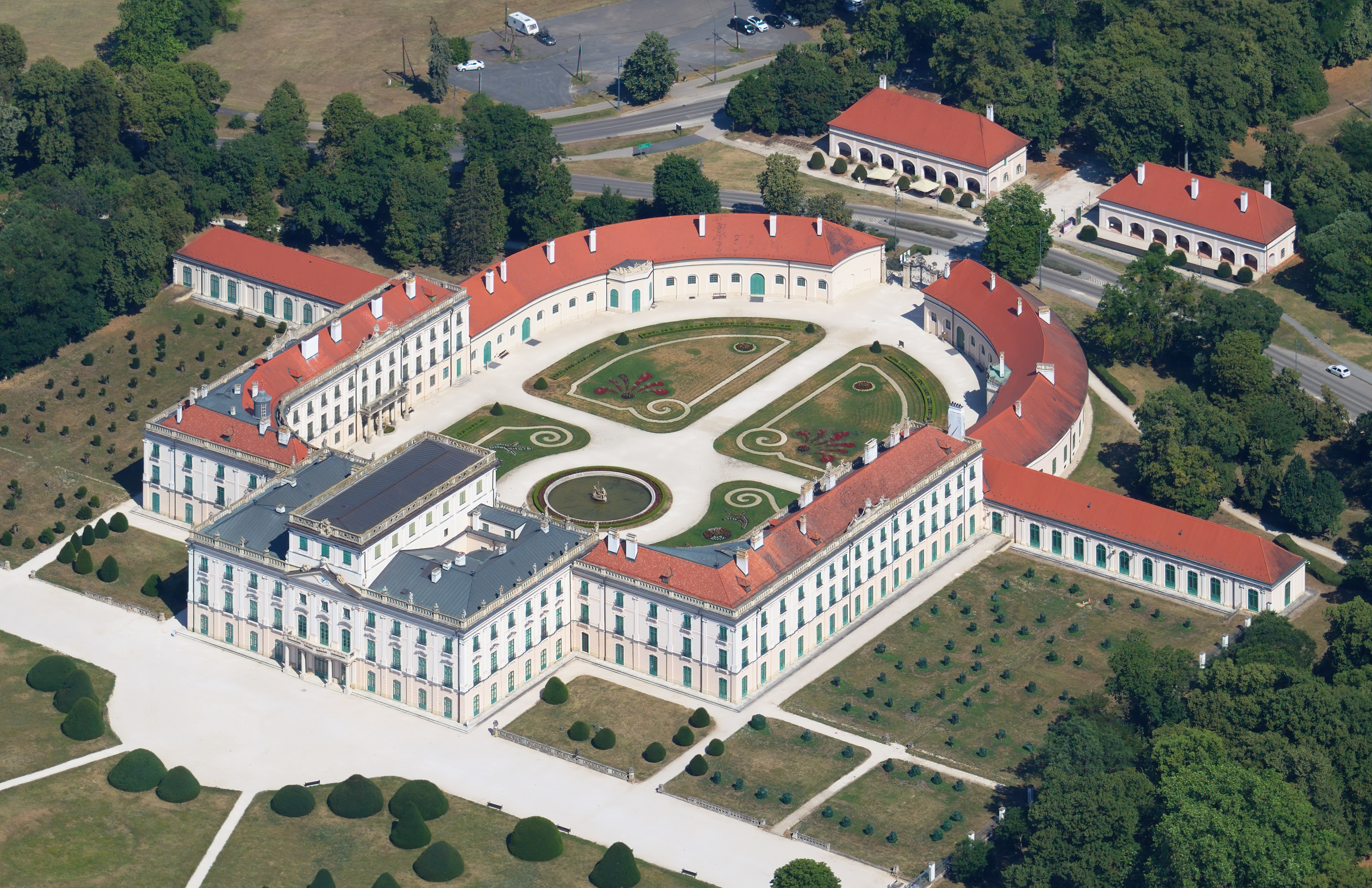
Haydn's place of exile: the Esterháza palace in present-day Fertőd, Hungary

At the time he wrote the sonata, Haydn was 58 years old and nearing a pivotal point in his career. For 28 years he had served the Esterházy family as their director of music, spending an ever-increasing amount of his time isolated in the family's palace at Esterháza in rural Hungary. As of 1779 he had been allowed to publish his own works, which proved popular throughout Europe, generating new commissions from afar: Paris, Cadiz, Naples. A magazine noted (1784) "the universality of Haydn's genius cannot be more strongly proved than by the vast demand for his works all over Europe." Yet he was little seen in the musical world, apart from two or so months of the year when he was able to visit Vienna, the imperial capital and great musical center. In Vienna he was able to interact with many other musicians, for instance, in playing chamber music with his friend Wolfgang Amadeus Mozart. He was also invited into cultivated homes, such as that of Maria Anna von Genzinger, who ended up playing a major role in the creation of the H. XVI/49 sonata. But the joys of visiting Vienna served to focus Haydn's sense of discontent with his exile in Esterháza.

Although Haydn didn't know it, all this was about to change drastically with the death of his patron Prince Nikolaus Esterházy on 29 September 1790. Haydn was released to move to Vienna, then journey to London, launching the most successful phase of his career.

=== Maria Anna von Genzinger ===
Haydn met Mrs. Genzinger mostly likely in 1789, during one of his stays in Vienna. She was at the time 36 years old, and was an amateur musician and a mother of six. Wigmore describes her as "cultured, warm-hearted, and a talented pianist." In 1773, when she was 18, she had married Peter von Genzinger (1737-1797), who was a successful doctor who served as the personal physician of Prince Esterházy. Mrs. Genzinger belonged to a higher social class than Haydn and was addressed by him with the title "Your Grace" (German "Euer Gnaden"). She presided over a cultivated and musical home, and Haydn's visits there were treasured by him—he wrote to her of "those wonderful parties -- where the whole circle is one heart, one soul -- all the beautiful evenings ...". However, since Haydn was so often required to be at Esterháza, much of their interaction took place by correspondence. In these letters, Haydn sometimes poured out his feelings, to a degree unique among his acquaintances.

In the judgment of biographers, it is likely that Haydn was in love with Mrs. Genzinger—but he also valued her as a friend, and did not cross the line to untoward behavior. The Piano Sonata Hob. XVI/49 was written by Haydn as a gift to her. Whatever Haydn's feelings may have been, it seems that the gift led to some awkwardness.

=== The anomalous dedication ===
Given that the work emerged as a personal gift to Mrs. Genzinger, it may seem odd that it was dedicated to a different woman: the autograph specified the dedicatee thus: "per la stimatissima [most esteemed] Signora Anna de Jerlischeck." Anna Jerlischeck was young woman of some wealth who, following the death of Princess Maria Elisabeth (25 Feb. 1790), took on the role of housekeeper at Prince Nikolaus's court. Later in 1790 Jerlischeck married the violinist/businessman Johann Tost, who commissioned a number of Haydn's string quartets. It appears that Jerlischeck, who was a relative of Mrs. Genzinger, had originally commissioned the sonata from Haydn so that she could make a gift of it to Mrs. Genzinger. This is seen in a letter Haydn wrote to Mrs. Genzinger on 6 June 1790:

JUST BETWEEN US! Your Grace should know that our Mademoiselle Nanette [Anna Jerlischeck] has commissioned me to compose a new Clavier sonata for you, which may not come into the hands of anyone else. I consider myself fortunate to have received such an order. Your Grace will receive this sonata in two weeks at most. Said Mademoiselle promised me a payment for it. Your Grace will easily understand that I shall refuse any; your approval will ever be the greatest reward to me.

Although Haydn declined a fee from Mlle Jerlischeck, he did in the end accept a gold snuffbox for composing the sonata, after performing (24 June 1790) the work for Jerlischeck and Prince Esterházy.

Daniel Heartz found the correspondence surrounding the sonata to be rather odd, and suggested a novel explanation for the procedure that Haydn was following:

The story has a concocted ring to it. Why did the composer need an excuse to compose such a sonata? It could be that Mlle Nanette was being used as a go-between to as to deflect further suspicions of his paying Her Grace too many attentions.

The compiler of the standard catalog of Haydn's works, Anthony van Hoboken, observed that the dedication to Mlle Jerlischeck gives evidence of being pasted over an earlier text, which Geiringer (1982:281 fn.) suggests was a dedication to Mrs. Genzinger.

It was on 20 June that Haydn announced to Mrs. Genzinger that the sonata would arrive at her home shortly. He tells her that only the Adagio movement is new, and that that this movement bears a special significance.

The day before yesterday I delivered the new Sonata to Mademoiselle Nanette, my patroness; I had hoped that she would express a wish to hear me play this Sonata, but up to now I have not received any such order, and for this reason I also do not know whether Your Grace will receive this Sonata in today's mail or not. This Sonata is in E flat, brand new, and was written especially for Your Grace to be hers forever, but it is a curious coincidence that the last movement is the very same Minuet and Trio which Your Grace asked me for in your last letter. This Sonata was destined for Your Grace a year ago, and only the Adagio is quite new, and I especially recommend this movement to your attention, for it contains many things which I shall analyze for Your Grace when the time comes; it is rather difficult but full of feeling.

=== Mrs. Genzinger's reaction ===
On July 11, having received the sonata and practiced it, Mrs. Genzinger wrote to Haydn from Vienna in reply:

The sonata pleases me exceedingly well, but there is one thing which I wish could be changed (if by so doing it does not detract from the beauty of the piece), and that is the passage in the second part of the Adagio, where the hands cross over; I am not used to this and thus find it hard to do, and so please let me know how this could be altered."

Haydn promised an altered version, but it has never come to light.

A possible reason for Mrs. Genzinger's objection has been addressed by scholars. The hand-crossings are, in fact, not especially difficult for the pianist. It seems, rather, that Mrs. Genzinger was motivated by a wish for physical modesty in avoiding the arm gestures and bodily movements needed to play them. Jordan (2016) writes that Mrs. Genzinger requested the change

because of the bodily and therefore visual affect this would have in performance. [ Fortepianist and scholar ] Tom Beghin notes that this passage "requires a contortion of arms and body that any well-postured, right-handed noble woman would have resisted." Left-handedness was treated with suspicion during the eighteenth century, so the attention-grabbing movement of crossing the left arm over the right may have been perceived as particularly ugly in its conspicuousness.

In the same letter Mrs. Genzinger complained that while Haydn had promised her a symphony, she had only gotten a sonata.

Despite the possible duplicities and complaints, Haydn and Mrs. Genzinger remained good friends to the very end, namely her tragically premature death from lung disease in 1793.

=== Mrs. Genzinger's instrument ===
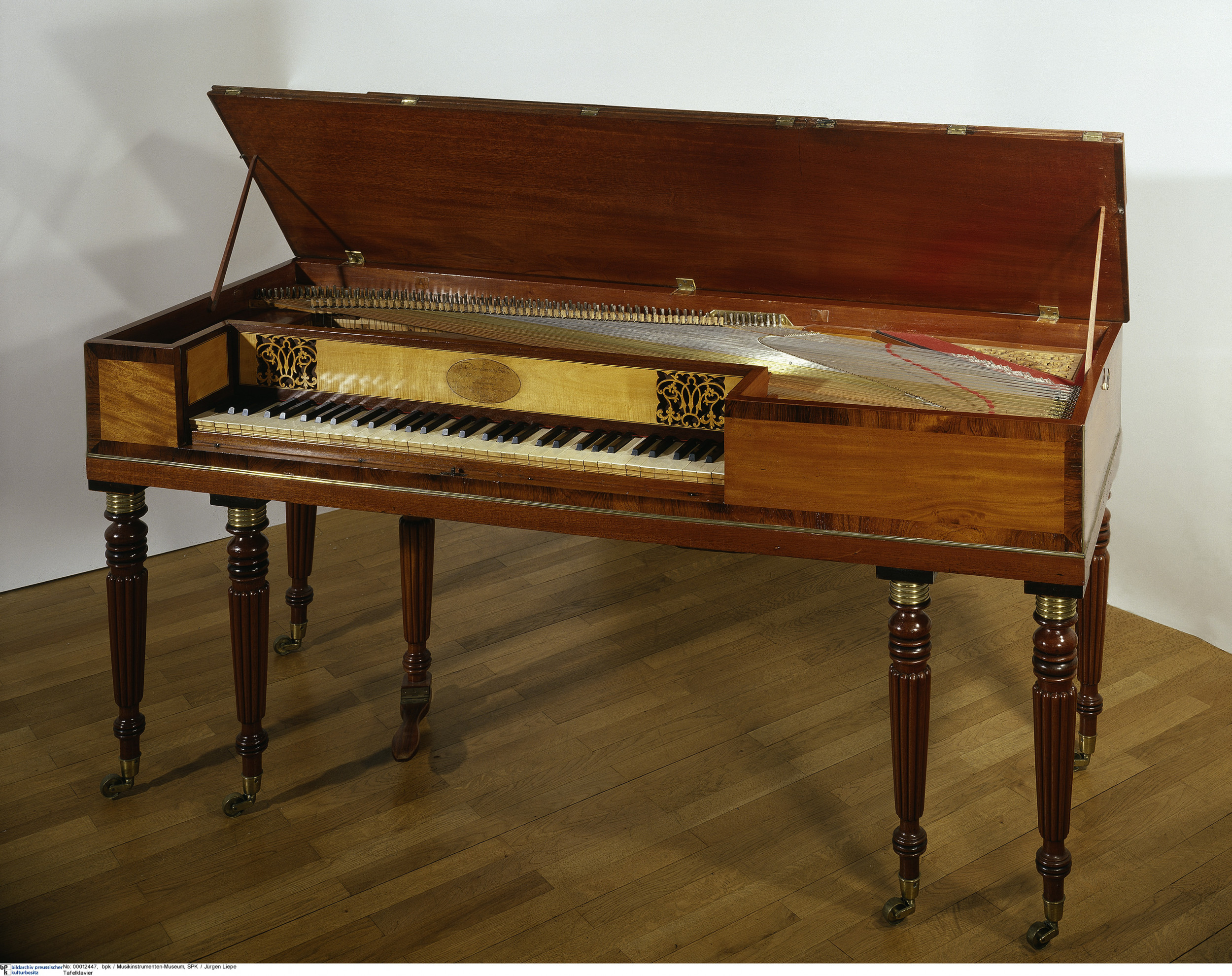
(Click to expand.) This 1815 Broadwood square dates from about a generation after the Haydn XVI/49 sonata, but does serve to illustrate the size, and frequent attractive decoration, of these domestic instruments. No square pianos from Wenzel Schanz have survived.

The possible embarrassments mentioned above may have been augmented by a further factor: according to fortepianist Tom Beghin, it is likely that Mrs. Genzinger did not own an appropriate instrument for playing the work: she had a harpsichord, which cannot render the many dynamic subtleties Haydn wrote into the sonata. Beghin writes:

Haydn explains, "I know I ought to have arranged this sonata in accordance with your kind of keyboard," [Beghin: Clavier; from a few sentences before it is clear that harpsichord is meant] "but I found this impossible because I am no longer accustomed to it" (June 27, 1790). If Haydn bought a new piano [by Wenzel Schanz] in the fall of 1788, celebrating his purchase in March of 1789 with a new Fantasy Hob. XVII:4 then it makes sense that he can’t go back ... But Haydn is clearly embarrassed. The etiquette of writing a piece for someone required taking into account the type of instrument the person owned. Haydn’s quite drastic solution is to convince Frau von Genzinger to buy a Schanz herself. That's exactly what he tries, over and over, through his subsequent letters—and he succeeds. Prince Esterházy himself decides to donate a piano on Haydn’s behalf, through her husband Peter von Genzinger.

Beghin goes on to suggest that the new Schanz was a square; that is, a small rectangular instrument with fairly delicate sound and light touch. Once Mrs. Genzinger finally had her piano, it may indeed have been an ideal instrument for the performance of this work: Wigmore (p. 254) notes the sonata's "crystalline, Mozartian keyboard style", contrasting it with the heavier sonority of the Broadwood pianos suited to Haydn's later, more flamboyant London sonatas (Hob. XVI/50 and Hob. XVI/52).

== Publication ==
The sonata was first published in August 1791 by Artaria; it is not clear whether the publication was authorized by Haydn or pirated. The title page (in French) reads:

Sonata for harpsichord or pianoforte composed by Joseph Haydn. Opus 66. Artaria and Company, Vienna

The edition bears no dedication. The specification of possible performance on the harpsichord of piano music (clearly contrary to Haydn's own wishes, as seen above) was common in music publishing at this time, and was applied to Beethoven's piano music for many years to come. The opus number 66 is not used today; most references employ the Hoboken catalog identification number XVI/49 instead.

== Critical commentary ==
The work has attracted strong admiration from musicians and scholars. Fortepianist Malcolm Bilson recorded the sonata along with its more-famous companion Hob. XVI/52 under the title "Two Great E-Flat Sonatas" (Nonesuch, 1983). Warm assessments, with discussion, are found in the work of Geiringer (1982), Harrison (2002), Wigmore (2009) and Heartz (2009). The latter writes (p. 412) "the more one gets to know the work the lovelier it becomes." Maurice Hinson, in the preface to his edition of the Haydn sonatas, writes (1992:17) "the full glory of the Viennese Classical style is apparent in this work."

Of the first movement Wigmore writes (2009:254):

Belying its nonchalant opening, the initial Allegro is a dramatic, closely wrought movement that evolves almost all its ideas from the main theme. The far-reaching development culminates in a tense modulating passage on a four-note ‘drum’ rhythm, with extreme contrasts of register. Remarkable, too, is the expansive coda, musing first on the gentle cadential theme and then on a lyrical ‘transitional’ idea that had immediately followed the opening.

The creation of most of the musical ideas from the opening theme in a sonata movement, remarked on by Wigmore, is sometimes called a monothematic exposition, and is a musical practice for which Haydn was admired. The use of an extended coda was new in Haydn's piano sonatas, a series which initially grew out of a series of simple pedagogical works. Geiringer writes (1982:281) "In this composition Haydn completely forgot the educational purpose of his piano music and followed only his inspiration."

The second movement, in slow triple time, is in ABA form, with A constituted by a beautiful, repeatedly varied melody, and B by a stormy minor-key passage in which the left hand enacts a dialog between bass and treble voices, repeatedly crossing over an accompanying arpeggios in the right hand (the passage complained about by Mrs. Genzinger). There is an extended coda. Biographers (e.g. Wigmore, 253) suggest that it is specifically this movement that would best serve as a love offering; see discussion above about the work's origin. Wigmore notes that Haydn originally planned a two-movement sonata, then later added the more emotionally charged Adagio movement with Mrs. Genzinger in mind. Of the movement he writes, "If Haydn was in love with Maria Anna -- and we can guess that he was -- his feelings might be divined from this sensitive, intimate music." Wigmore also praises Haydn's variation technique: "Unlike in some of the earlier sonatas, the increasingly elaborate variations of the theme delicately enhance rather than dissipate the music's expressiveness."

Of final movement, which is in minuet tempo, Wigmore observed that it is "a free rondo with two episodes [that] relaxes the tension after two such highly charged movements." He also notes that the theme of the first rondo episode is an evident quotation of a cadential theme of the first movement.

== See also ==
- List of solo piano compositions by Joseph Haydn
