= Piano Sonata in E-flat major =

Piano Sonata in E-flat major may refer to:

- Sonata No. 6 in E-flat major (J. C. F. Bach)
- Piano Sonata in E-flat (Bax)
- Piano Sonata No. 4 (Beethoven)
- Piano Sonata No. 18 (Beethoven)
- Piano Sonata No. 26 (Beethoven)
- Piano Sonata in E-flat major, WoO 47 No. 1 (Beethoven)
- Piano Sonata Hob. XVI/38 (Haydn)
- Piano Sonata Hob. XVI/49 (Haydn)
- Piano Sonata Hob. XVI/52 (Haydn)
- Piano Sonata No. 2 (Kabalevsky)
- Piano Sonata No. 4 (Mozart)
- Piano Sonata in E-flat major, D 568 (Schubert)
