= Maria Anna von Genzinger =

Viennese musician (1754–1793)

Maria Anna Sabina (von) Genzinger (6 November 1754 – 26 January 1793), called Marianne, was a Viennese amateur musician, the mother of six children, and a friend of the composer Joseph Haydn. Her correspondence with Haydn preserves a personal view of the composer not available from any other biographical source.

== Background ==
Marianne Genzinger was the daughter of Joseph von Kayser, who served as court councillor for Prince Batthyány. Her mother, born Maria Anna von Hackher zu Hart, was of an old Austrian aristocratic family.

While growing up, she learned to play the keyboard (probably at the time a harpsichord); this was a common undertaking at the time for girls and young women of her social class. In 1771, she served as godmother at the baptism of the daughter of Andreas Henneberger (1727–1791), a Vienna organist whose son Johann Baptist Henneberg grew up to be an important figure in the Viennese musical scene. Michael Lorenz suggests that this fact likely identifies Henneberger as Marianne Genzinger's teacher.

On 29 June 1773 she married the physician Peter Leopold Genzinger (b. son of the abbey's apothecary on 17 November 1737 in Schlägl, d. 8 September 1797 in Vienna). Robbins Landon describes Genzinger as "a popular 'Ladies' Doctor'". In 1780, Genzinger was ennobled to the lowest rank of the nobility, designated "Edler von," and on 18 June 1793, when he had already become Rector Magnificus of the medical faculty, his rank of nobility was raised to "Ritter von" (knighthood). For many years, Genzinger served as Physician in Ordinary to Prince Nikolaus Esterhazy, who from 1766 to his death in 1790 was Joseph Haydn's patron and employer. It is plausible that Haydn met Genzinger through this connection.

Marianne von Genzinger bore six children, four boys and two girls.

The family's home was within the Schottenhof in central Vienna, a network of courtyards next to the Schottenkirche, which formerly served as a monastery. The location is a short walk from the Vienna palace of the Esterházy family on the Wallnerstraße, where Haydn would have worked during his stays in the city. The Genzinger home was a cultivated one that offered musical soirees which were widely attended in musical Vienna.

The friendship with Haydn began in 1789. At this time, the composer was 57 years old, and was nearing the end of his nearly 30 years of full-time service with Esterhazy princes, the latter half spent mostly at the remote palace of Esterháza in Hungary. Although he was the most celebrated of all composers at the time, he still was bound by loyalty and economic considerations to his Prince. Haydn frequently sought to visit Vienna, which however lay a considerable distance from Esterháza.

== The origin of the friendship ==
Although it is not known how Haydn and Genzinger met, it likely arose because the Genzinger home functioned as a salon, with musical gatherings, and they met in this context. The first documentation of the friendship comes from their correspondence: having arranged the Andante movement of one of Haydn's symphonies for piano, Genzinger mailed a copy of her work to the composer, asking him to critique it. Here is the text of her letter, dated 10 June 1789: (Note: Translation from Robbins Landon (1959, 85). According to Robbins Landon (1959, xxi), Genzinger had trouble with German spelling; her orthography was "several grades more appalling than Haydn's".)

[three crosses]

Most respected Herr v[on] Hayden,

With your kind permission, I take the liberty of sending you a pianoforte arrangement of the beautiful Andante from your so admirable composition. I made this arrangement from the score quite by myself, without the least help from my teacher; please be good enough to correct any mistakes you may find in it. I hope that you are enjoying perfect health, and I wish for nothing more than to see you soon again in Vienna, so that I may demonstrate still further the esteem in which I hold you. I remain, in true friendship,

Your obedient servant, Maria Anna Noble v. Gennzinger

My husband and children also nk Noble v. Kayser. ask me to send you their kindest regards.

Haydn responded with words of praise:

Nobly born and gracious Lady!

In all my previous correspondence, nothing delighted me more than the surprise of seeing such a lovely handwriting, (Note: Jones (2009) says that Genzinger's writing was in fact "very poorly formed", suggesting flattery.) and reading so many kind expressions; but even more I admired the enclosure the excellent arrangement of the Adagio, which is correct enough to be engraved by any publisher. I would like to know only whether Your Grace arranged the Adagio from the score, or whether you took the amazing trouble of first putting it into score from the parts and only then arranging it for the pianoforte; if the latter, such an attention would be too flattering to me, for I really don't deserve it.

Best and kindest Frau v. Gennsinger! I only await a hint from you as to how and in what fashion I can possibly be of service to Your Grace. Meanwhile I return the Adagio, and very much hope to receive from Your Grace some demands on my modest talents; I am, with sincere esteem and respect,

Your Grace's most obedient servant,

Josephus Haydn [m.p]ria. (Note: Manu propria, Latin phrase meaning that the letter was written down by the author, rather than dictated.) Estoras, (Note: This is how Haydn normally wrote "Esterháza".) 14th June 1789. N.S. Please present my respectful compliments to your husband.

Haydn soon became a family friend, with visits during the time he was able to come, namely when he visited Vienna in the company of his patron. Haydn biographer Karl Geiringer describes Haydn's visits to the Genzingers as follows:

Both the doctor and his charming wife, Marianne, an excellent singer and pianist, were real friends of music. On Sundays, the musical elite of Vienna used to assemble at the Genzingers' home for performances of the first quality. Haydn attended these gatherings whenever he was in Vienna, and they meant a great deal to him. There he found an atmosphere that seemed like the fulfillment of his old dreams: a comfortable, pleasant home; a woman of high culture who took the keenest interest in every one of his new compositions and who at the same time was so thoughtful a hostess that she prepared his favorite dishes; musically gifted children whom he could guide. The Genzinger home offered him all that he had missed throughout his married life. He basked in this congenial atmosphere, only to feel all the more strongly the misery of his lonely existence when he returned to Eszterháza.

== Haydn's loneliness ==
The backdrop to this description is that Haydn's own marriage had been unhappy almost from the very start, and had produced no children. Haydn was also conducting a long term love affair with the singer Luigia Polzelli, but this may have been fading, in light of the fact that two years later Haydn did not bring Luigia with him on his first visit to London. Haydn may also have been deprived of ordinary male friendship, given that his contract required him to act as a "house officer" and remain socially aloof from the musicians under his direction. (Note: See Clause 3 of Haydn's contract with the Eszterházys, printed p. 44 of Geiringer 1982.)

That Haydn did indeed feel lonely during his final years at Eszterháza is suggested by a letter to Genzinger, dated February 9, 1790:

Well, here I sit in my wilderness; forsaken, like some poor orphan, almost without human society, melancholy, dwelling on the memory of past glorious days. Yes, past, alas! And who can tell when those happy hours may return--those charming meeting where the whole circle has but one heart and one soul--all those delightful musical evenings that can only be remembered and not described?

Other letters suggest that Haydn, whose persona is often assumed to be uniformly and stereotypically jolly (see Papa Haydn) experienced depression at times. (Note: This seems to be the view of Webster and Feder (2002, 45), and Geiringer (2002, 95) says of this period, "Haydn had ceased to be happy at Eszterháza.") A letter of May 1790 reads:

I beg Your Grace not to shy away from comforting me by your pleasant letters, for they cheer me up in my isolation, and are highly necessary for my heart, which is often very deeply hurt.

== Her children ==
It is clear that Haydn took an interest in Genzinger's children, particularly their musical development. For instance, in a letter from Esterhaza from 9 February 1790, he wrote:

My good friend Fräulein Peperl will (I hope) be reminded of her teacher by singing the Cantata frequently; she should remember to have a distinct articulation and a correct vocal production, for it would be a crime if so beautiful a voice were to remain hidden in her breast; so therefore I ask her to smile frequently, lest I be disappointed in her. Likewise I advise Mons. François to cultivate his musical talents; even when he sings in his dressing-gown, he does very nicely.

"Peperl" is the diminutive form of "Josepha", (Note: The basis is the second syllable seph, with its consonants rendered with [p] in toddler speech, plus the diminutive suffix -erl (familiar from Mozart's sister Nannerl). When he was a child, Joseph Haydn was addressed with a similar diminutive, "Sepperl" (Geiringer 1982:10). For the sound changes involved, see Phonological development, under "stopping" and "consonant harmony".) Genzinger's oldest child, who was 16. "François" is French for "Franz", her 15-year-old son. The "Cantata" Haydn mentions is Arianna a Naxos, Hob. XXVIa/2, composed 1788.

== The first London journey ==
Haydn may be assumed to have visited the Genzingers more often after the death of Prince Nikolaus (28 September 1790), when he was dismissed by the new prince from his duties, was given a pension, and settled in Vienna. However, the stay in Vienna was only for a brief time; on 15 December 1790, Haydn left Vienna on the first of his two journeys to London, where he enjoyed great success both musically and financially. Much of the information we have about Haydn's London visits comes from letters he wrote to Genzinger while there. The following is an extract from a letter written on 20 December 1791.

Now, gracious lady, I would like to take you to task a little, for believing that I prefer the city of London to Vienna, and that I find the sojourn here more agreeable than that in my fatherland. I don't hate London, but I would not be capable of spending the rest of my life there, even if I could amass millions. I shall tell Your Grace the reason when I see you. I look forward tremendously to going home and to embracing all my good friends. I only regret that the great Mozart will not be among them, if it is really true, which I trust it is not, that he has died. Posterity will not see such a talent again in 100 years!

It was confirmed to Haydn only shortly thereafter, and much to his sorrow, that Mozart really had died (5 December 1791).

== Death and mourning ==
The last letter from Haydn to Genzinger is dated 13 November 1792, thus following his return to Vienna on 24 July.

Gracious Lady!

Apart from wishing you a Good Morning, this is to ask you to give the bearer of this letter the final big Aria in F minor from my opera, because I must have it copied for my Princess. I will bring it back myself in 2 days at the latest. Today I take the liberty of inviting myself to lunch, which I shall have the opportunity of kissing Your Grace's hands in return. Meanwhile I am, as always,

Y[our] G[race's]
Most obedient servant,
Joseph Haydn

By "my opera" Haydn meant his L'anima del filosofo, completed the previous year; the aria in question is a lament by the main character Orpheus.

The letter gives no hint at all that Genzinger was ill, but in fact she died only two months later, on 26 January 1793. The cause of death was given as "lung ulcers." She was 38 years old. Haydn's feelings at the time are not preserved, though the musicologist H. C. Robbins Landon suggests that his F Minor Variations for piano, which stand out in Haydn's oeuvre for their tone of impassioned anguish, may have been written as a tacit commemoration of Genzinger. (Note: This web site goes further, suggesting that the Variations actually quote the F minor aria for Orpheus mentioned above (though the resemblance appears to be rather slight). As the Web site points out, the aria is one "in which the inconsolable Orpheus, having lost his Eurydice, yearns for death.")

Karl Geiringer writes "With Marianne's death, something never to be recaptured went out of Haydn's life. A certain sarcasm in his nature began to show, an asperity of which the diary of his second trip to London offers many instances."

== A love affair? ==
Geiringer and other biographers have addressed the question of whether Haydn was in love with Genzinger. The most likely answer seems to be that he was, but was very aware of how catastrophic the consequences would be if they pursued a romantic connection, and exercised restraint. Moreover, the various veiled utterances found in Haydn's letters are not matched in Marianne's, who (Geiringer) "certainly showed no more than friendliness."

Haydn biographer Rosemary Hughes writes:

'It is easy to see that he was, in a deeply respectful way, half in love with Marianne ... He anxiously assures her, when one of his letters to her had been lost on the way, that it contained nothing dishonourable for the inquisitive to seize on ... His deep anxiety was that she ... should take fright and break off their correspondence.

== Genzinger as dedicatee ==
Haydn wrote his Piano Sonata in E flat, Hob. XVI/49 (1 June 1790), for Madame Genzinger. The work is considered one of Haydn's finest sonatas. (Note: For instance, Malcolm Bilson issued a recording of it along with Hob. XVI/52 under the title "Two Great E Flat Sonatas", and Maurice Hinson in the preface to his edition of the sonatas says (p. 17), "The full glory of the Viennese Classical style is apparent in this work.") Concerning the slow movement, Haydn wrote to Madame Genzinger, "I recommend it especially to your attention for it contains many things which I shall analyze for your grace when the time comes; it is rather difficult but full of feeling." She wrote that "I like the Sonata very much, but there is one thing which I wish could be changed (if by so doing it does not detract from the beauty of the piece), and that is the passage in the second part of the Adagio, where the hands cross over; I am not used to this and thus found it hard to do, and so please let me know how this could be altered."

== Works consulted ==
- Geiringer, Karl; Irene Geiringer (1982). Haydn: A Creative Life in Music (3rd ed.). University of California Press. pp. xii, 403. ISBN 0-520-04316-2.
- Hinson, Maurice (1992) Haydn: The Complete Piano Sonatas, Vol. 3, Alfred Publishing, Van Nuys, CA.
- Hughes, Rosemary (1974) Haydn, J. M. Dent, London.
- Jones, David Wyn (2009) The Life of Haydn. Cambridge: Cambridge University Press.
- Robbins Landon, H. C. (1955) The Symphonies of Joseph Haydn, London.
- Robbins Landon, H. C. (1959) The Collected Correspondence and London Notebooks of Joseph Haydn, London: Barrie and Rockliff.
- Loesser, Arthur (1954) Men, Women, and Pianos: A Social History. Mineola, NY: Dover Publications.
- Parakilas, James (2002) Piano Roles: A New History of the Piano. New Haven: Yale University Press.
- Landon, H. C. Robbins; David Wyn Jones (1988). Haydn: His Life and Music. Indiana University Press. ISBN 978-0-253-37265-9.
