= Piano Sonata in C major =

Piano Sonata in C major may refer to:

- Piano Sonata No. 1 (Brahms)
- Piano Sonata No. 3 (Beethoven)
- Piano Sonata No. 21 (Beethoven)
- Piano Sonata, WoO. 51 (Beethoven)
- Piano Sonata Hob. XVI/15 (Haydn)
- Piano Sonata Hob. XVI/50 (Haydn)
- Piano Sonata No. 1 (Mozart)
- Piano Sonata No. 7 (Mozart)
- Piano Sonata No. 10 (Mozart)
- Piano Sonata No. 16 (Mozart)
- Sonata in C major for piano four-hands, K. 521 (Mozart)
- Piano Sonata in C major, D 279 (Schubert)
- Piano Sonata in C major, D 613 (Schubert)
- Sonata in C major for piano four-hands, D 812 (Schubert)
- Piano Sonata in C major, D 840 (Schubert)
- Piano Sonata No. 5 (Prokofiev)
- Piano Sonata No. 9 (Prokofiev)
