= Keyboard Sonata No. 34 =

Keyboardd Sonata No. 34 may refer to:

- Piano Sonata Hob. XVI/33, L. 34, in D major, by Haydn
- Piano Sonata Hob. XVI/34, L. 53, in E minor, by Haydn
