= Piano Sonata Hob. XIV/5 =

Sonata by Joseph Haydn

The Piano Sonata in D major, Hob. XIV/5, L.28, also called a divertimento, is a (formerly lost) sonata written c.1765–1771 by Joseph Haydn. However, Anthony van Hoboken's catalogue states the composition date as "before 1766". It may have been written for 2 violins and cello.

== History ==
Fragments of the sonata were discovered in a private collection and were subsequently sold at auction in 1961. The fragments are now in the possession of the Preußische Staatsbibliothek. Later that year Charles Spinks gave the first contemporary performance of part of this sonata as part of a broadcast on Haydn piano sonatas for the BBC. The text of this broadcast can be found in H. C. Robbins Landon’s, Essays on Eighteenth-Century Music (1969).

The sonata was reconstructed by Christa Landon (H.C. Robbins Landon's first wife) and Karl Heinz Füssl. It was subsequently published in a Wiener Urtext edition (UT 50027) under Hob. XVI/5a Add.
