= Keyboard Sonata No. 33 =

Keyboard Sonata No. 33 may refer to:

- Piano Sonata Hob. XVI/20, L. 33, in C minor, by Haydn
- Piano Sonata Hob. XVI/33, L. 34, in D major, by Haydn
