= Piano Sonata in D major =

Piano Sonata in D major may refer to:

- Piano Sonata No. 7 (Beethoven)
- Piano Sonata No. 15 (Beethoven)
- Sonata in D major for piano four-hands, Op. 6 (Beethoven)
- Piano Sonata in D major, WoO 47 No. 3 (Beethoven)
- Piano Sonata No. 6 (Mozart)
- Piano Sonata No. 9 (Mozart)
- Piano Sonata No. 18 (Mozart)
- Sonata for Two Pianos in D major (Mozart)
- Piano Sonata in D major, D 850 (Schubert)
- Piano Sonata Hob. XVI/33 (Haydn)
- Piano Sonata Hob. XIV/5 (Haydn)
