= Piano Sonata Hob. XVI/38 =

Keyboard sonata composed by Joseph Haydn

Keyboard Sonata
- by Joseph Haydn
- Key: E♭ major
- Catalogue: Hob. XVI/38; L. 51
- Genre: Sonata
- Style: Classical
- Dedication: Katharina and Marianna Auenbrugger
- Published: 1780
- Movements: 3
- Scoring: Keyboard

The Sonata in E♭ major (Hob. XVI/38, L. 51) is a keyboard sonata composed by Joseph Haydn, also referred to as a piano sonata. The three-movement work was published by Artaria in 1780 in a set of six sonatas dedicated to the sisters Katharina and Marianna Auenbrugger.

The sonata has three movements:

1. Allegro moderato (E♭ major)
2. Adagio (C minor)
3. Finale: Allegro (E♭ major)

The first movement is in sonata form. It is monothematic, in that the movement only presents and significantly develops one distinct theme. The second movement is a siciliana. The third is in da capo form, akin to a minuet and trio. The two movements are linked by an attacca direction: the second movement has an open ending on a G-major chord; the third movement follows immediately, and that chord becomes the submediant triad (with raised third) of the new movement's key of E♭ major.
