= Piano Sonata Hob. XVI/20 =

Keyboard sonata composed by Joseph Haydn

Keyboard Sonata
- by Joseph Haydn
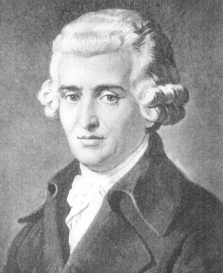
- 1870 painting of the composer by Karl Jäger
- Key: C minor
- Catalogue: Hob. XVI/20; L. 33
- Genre: Sonata
- Style: Classical
- Composed: 1771
- Dedication: Katharina and Marianna Auenbrugger
- Published: 1780
- Movements: 3
- Scoring: Keyboard

The Sonata in C minor (Hob. XVI/20, L. 33) is a keyboard sonata composed by Joseph Haydn in 1771. It is also referred to as a piano sonata. The three-movement work was published by Artaria in 1780 in a set of six sonatas dedicated to the sisters Katharina and Marianna Auenbrugger.

== History ==
The work was the first of Haydn's that he titled Sonata. He had called his earlier multi-movement works for solo keyboard "divertimentos" or "partitas". It was not until later that these works also assumed the title of Sonata.

The sonata was published by Artaria in 1780 in a set of six sonatas dedicated to the sisters Katharina and Marianna Auenbrugger. The other six in the set were the five sonatas numbered XVI/35 to XVI/39 in the Hoboken-Verzeichnis catalogue. Haydn considered the Hob. XVI/20 to be the most difficult of the set to perform. The American musicologist Howard Pollack argues that the sonata was composed for the clavichord but that it might have been "touched up" for publication in 1780 to suit the emerging fortepiano, which the Auenbrugger sisters played.

The sonata stands out among Haydn's early keyboard works for its difficulty, dynamic contrasts and dramatic intensity. The British musicologist Richard Wigmore calls the sonata "Haydn's Appassionata", referring to Beethoven's Piano Sonata No. 23, Op. 57. The music critic Stephen Plaistow, writing in Gramophone, suggests that the sonata is "one of Haydn’s best and perhaps also the first great sonata for the piano by anybody".

== Structure ==
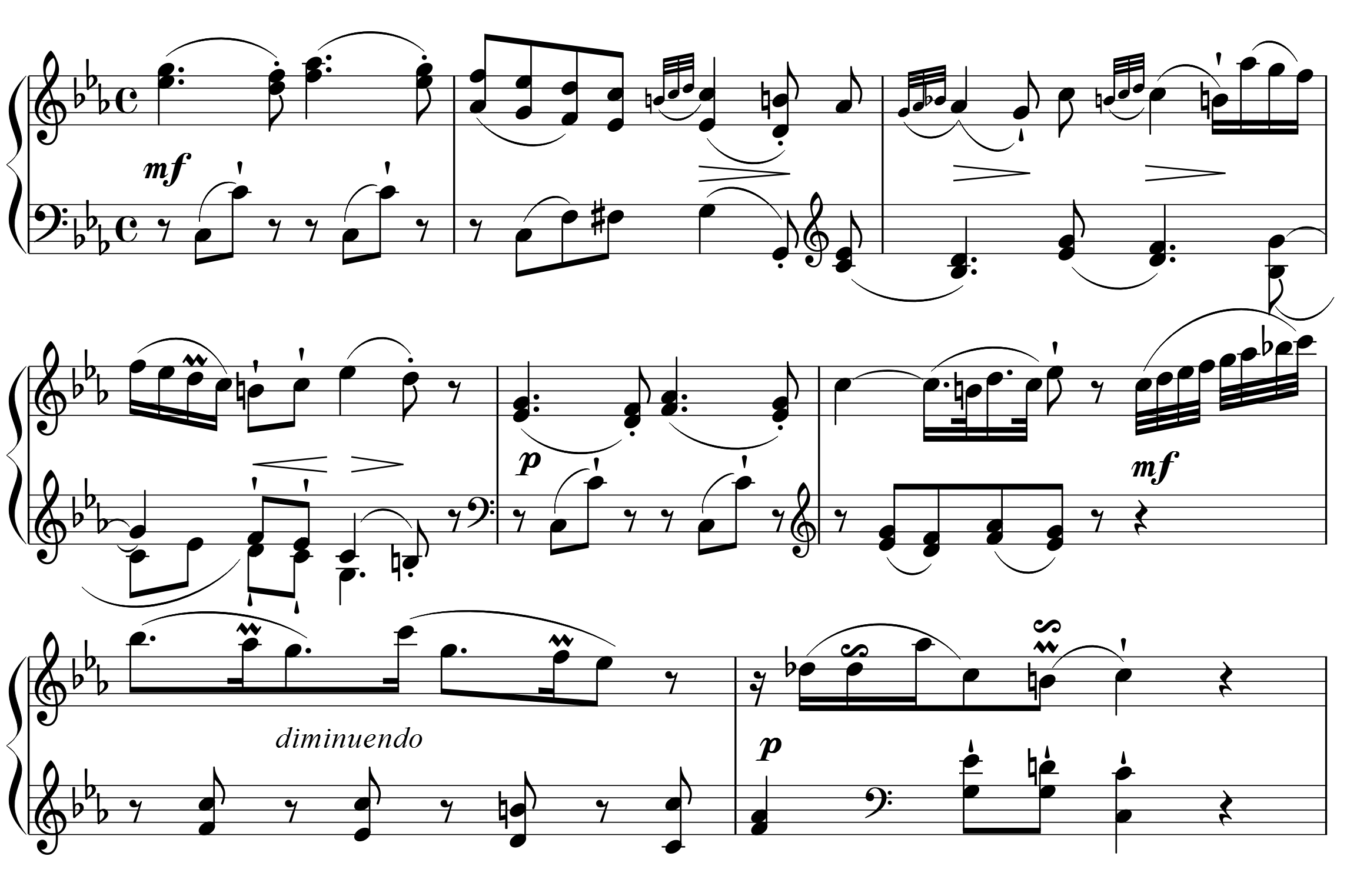
The first eight measures of the first movement.

The sonata is in three movements:

1. Moderato
2. Andante con moto (A♭ major)
3. Finale – Allegro

The first movement is in sonata form. The movement's exposition and recapitulation are in tripartite structures, the parts of which the Finnish musicologist Lauri Suurpää classifies as "initiating, medial and concluding". In the exposition, the initiating passage is from measures 1 to 8, the medial passage is from measures 9 to 31, and the concluding passage is from measures 32 to 37. The exposition and recapitulation both contain quasi-cadenzas that Haydn wrote into the score.

The second movement, marked "andante con moto", is in A♭ major and 3/4 time, and features multiple passages of syncopation.

The finale returns to the sonata's home key of C minor. Its opening is redolent of a minuet, but the movement is no minuet and trio. Instead it is a sonata form movement that develops with increasing intensity and difficulty, incorporating virtuosic cross-handed passages in which the left hand leaps from one extreme of the eighteenth-century keyboard to the other.
