= Piano Sonata Hob. XVI/52 =

1794 composition by Joseph Haydn

The Piano Sonata in E♭ major, Hob. XVI/52, L. 62, was written in 1794 by Joseph Haydn. It is the last of Haydn's piano sonatas, and is widely considered his greatest. It has been the subject of extensive analysis by distinguished musicological personages such as Heinrich Schenker and Sir Donald Tovey, largely because of its expansive length, unusual harmonies and interesting development. The sonata is sometimes referred to as number 62 based on the numbering of Landon instead of the numbering of Hoboken.

== History ==
Haydn wrote the work for Therese Jansen, an outstanding pianist who lived in London at the time of Haydn's visits there in the 1790s. Haydn served as a witness at her wedding to Gaetano Bartolozzi (16 May 1795). Haydn also dedicated three demanding piano trios (H. XV:27–29) and another two piano sonatas (H. XVI:50 and 51) to Jansen.

With regard to the E♭ sonata, Jansen was evidently the dedicatee of the autograph (hand-written) score but not the first published version. On the title page of the autograph Haydn wrote in Italian, "Sonata composta per la Celebre Signora Teresa de Janson ... di me giuseppe Haydn mpri Lond. 794," which means "Sonata composed for the celebrated Miss Theresa Jansen ... by myself Joseph Haydn in my own hand, London 1794."

Daniel Heartz implies that Haydn may have left the sonata unpublished for some time so that Jansen could have the work for her exclusive use. Ultimately, Haydn had the work published in Vienna in 1798, three years after he had returned there from London. The publisher was Artaria, and the dedicatee for the published version was the pianist Magdalena von Kurzbeck (1767–1845). A London edition, perhaps instigated by Jansen, appeared with Longman and Clementi in 1800 with the title "A grand new sonata for the piano forte composed expressly for Mrs. Bartolozzi, Op. 78."

== Structure ==
I. Allegro moderato

II. Adagio

III. Finale presto
Performed by Marek Kozak

The work has three movements:

1. Allegro (Moderato)
2. Adagio (3/4)
3. Finale: Presto (2/4)

The first movement takes approximately 7 to 8 minutes to perform with the repeat (without, it is approximately 5 minutes), the second movement 6.5 to 7.5 minutes, and the third movement 5 to 6 minutes.

The first movement, in sonata form, opens with an expansive theme derived from the form of the French overture and has a contrasting second theme in the upper "music box" register that has been identified with the wie aus der Ferne (as in the distance) trope of the nineteenth century. Its harmonic exploration is unusually broad for Haydn's solo piano writing. It has a strong rhythmic character and forward momentum.

The second movement, an adagio in ternary form, is in the key of E major, a distant key to the key of the piece (E♭ major). Throughout the movement, Haydn uses improvisatory figures such as repeated notes increasing in speed, wide arpeggios, and scalar runs.

The third movement is a lively sonata form. Haydn’s use of fermatas, a minor section in the middle of the movement, and the perpetual motion passages again show the improvisatory and virtuosic nature of this whole piece.
