= Piano Sonata in C minor =

Piano Sonata in C minor may refer to:

- Piano Sonata No. 5 (Beethoven)
- Piano Sonata No. 8 (Beethoven)
- Piano Sonata No. 32 (Beethoven)
- Piano Sonata No. 1 (Chopin)
- Piano Sonata Hob. XVI/20 (Haydn)
- Piano Sonata No. 14 (Mozart)
- Piano Sonata No. 4 (Prokofiev)
- Piano Sonata D. 958 (Schubert)
