= Keyboard Variations in C major (Haydn) =

Joseph Haydn

The Keyboard Variations No. 5 in C major, Hob. XVII/5, is a set of Keyboard variations written by Joseph Haydn in 1790 and published by Artaria & Co. on February 9, 1791.

== Structure ==
The work features a theme and six variations.

1. Thema (Andante)
2. Var. I
3. Var. II
4. Var. III
5. Var. IV.
6. Var. V. (Minore in C minor)
7. Var. VI (Maggiore)

== Notable recordings ==
Tom Beghin's The Virtual Haydn: Complete Works for Solo Keyboard.
