= Divertimento in G major =

Divertimento by Joseph Haydn

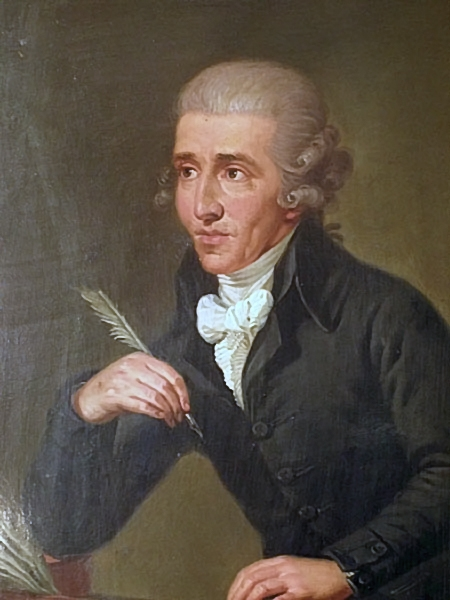
Portrait of Joseph Haydn

The Divertimento in G major, Hob. XVI/8, L. 1, was written in 1766 by Joseph Haydn.

== History ==
The keyboard divertimento resembles the sonata, but its purpose was more for entertainment. Haydn’s divertimentos tend to have three movements in a quick-slow-quick form, but the 18th century divertimento can have up to nine movements. The opening and closing allegro movements are usually in sonata form and are characteristically galant. Georg Feder groups this divertimento with nine others, calling them, “Nine small early sonatas.” Feder believes Haydn wrote them for his students or amateurs, as they are not technically challenging.

In a letter from Haydn to the Prince Nikolaus Esterházy on December 6, 1766, Haydn references six new divertimenti that he had composed. This divertimento, seeing as it is classified by Landon as Divertimento No. 1, might be among the divertimenti that he is referencing:

“The most joyous Name Feast (which, Your Highness, with the grace of God, may spend in most complete fortune and felicity) obliged me most duly…to deliver to Him, in all humbleness, 6 new divertimenti…. Furthermore, I received the high order to have the divertimenti composed by me (twelve pieces in all) bound. but since Your Highness had returned to me some of them to be changed and I did not annotate those changes into my score, I ask you most obediently to let come to me the first 12 pieces only for the duration of three days, thereafter also the others, one by one, so that everything, including the changes, could be copied well and correctly, and bound.”

== Structure ==
I. Allegro

II. Menuet

III. Andante

IV. Allegro
Performed by Bernd Krueger

The work has four movements:

1. Allegro
2. Menuet
3. Andante
4. Allegro

The piece is scored for harpsichord. The first movement is an abbreviated sonata form in 2/4 time, and is 44 measures long. It follows the pattern of modulation from tonic to dominant in the first section, with a ten bar central section before the recapitulation of the original material in G major. The movement is lively and has a two-voice texture. It presents rhythmic challenges such as triplets surrounded by duplets and off-beat patterns, and also features contrapuntal lines and sixteenth note triplets. The second movement is a minuet without the trio, in standard 3/4 time, and is a brief 16 measures in length. It has rhythmic complexity; in the first four measures half notes, quarter notes, eighth notes, eighth note triplets and sixteenth notes are all encountered. The third movement is a short, 9 measure andante in common time, where the first half of the piece is composed of four bars which are repeated once, and the second half comprises five bars which are also repeated. It is melodic and well balanced and also features contrapuntal lines. The allegro finale is in 3/8 time and is 24 measures long. It is also composed of two halves, which are both repeated once. It is described as a fast and jocund movement, and is a good study in finger independence and facility. It features broken interval figuration, octaves, and both sustained and moving notes.
