= Twenty Variations in G major (Haydn) =

Piece by Joseph Haydn

Twenty Variations in G major, Hob. XVII/2, was written in the 1760s by Joseph Haydn. In 1788/1789, Artaria published the Arietta con 12 Variazioni in A major (Twelve Variations in A major), which is an abridged version of the Twenty Variations in G major, and in a different key.

== History ==
There are two versions of these variations: Twenty Variations in G major and a shorter piece, Twelve Variations in A major, and are both referred to as Hob. XVII/2. This is due to the fact that Haydn wrote the Twenty Variations in 1765, but since he was in the employment of the Esterházy family at the time, he was not the owner of the music that he wrote, and consequently was not able to have his pieces published (this situation persisted to 1779, when his contract was revised to let Haydn publish.)

In 1788, Artaria published the Twenty Variations in G major as "Twelve Variations in A major". They have the same theme but differ in the number of variations. Both pieces are still performed; for example, the Twenty Variations in G major on Haydn: Piano Variations by Jenő Jandó, Arietta con 12 Variazioni in A major on Haydn: Piano Sonatas Vol. 9 by Jenő Jandó, and Twenty Variations in A major on The Virtual Haydn by Tom Beghin. The version most commonly recorded is the Twenty Variations in G major.

Gerlach (2007) offers a rather different view of the history of the text. In Gerlach's view, the original key of the work was A major, and among the copies of this work circulating at the time, there were various versions "altered or shortened according to [the users'] needs or tastes; sometimes the work was transposed to G major". In support of this, Gerlach notes that in Haydn's "Entwurf-Katalog", a sketch catalog he made of his works in the 1770s, the work is listed and given an incipit in A major. Gerlach also suggests that the Artaria edition was made without Haydn's authorization, and observes that it includes a new variation probably not by Haydn.

== Structure ==
The work is in theme and variation form, 320 measures long, and in 3/4 time. It is most likely scored for harpsichord. The tempo is allegretto. The theme is presented in two 8 bar melodic phrases accompanied by left hand triplets that are both repeated, followed by the variations. The first variation has triplet rhythms in the right hand, whereas the second variation has running sixteenth notes of a melody derived from the theme. The third variation has accompanying scale figuration in the left hand, introducing hand crossing. Variation 4 is a derivative of the original theme in the middle register of the keyboard. The fifth variation has right-hand sixteenths, and the sixth variation has fast accompanying activity in the left hand. Variation 7 features left hand chords. Variation 8 has a cantering rhythm, Variation 9 uses broken chords, the tenth variation features thirds and the eleventh exhibits octaves. Variation 15 is a similar to a French overture. Variation 17 is similar to a Solfeggio. Variation 18 is described as a pompous procession through the suspensions and trills, and Variation 19's thick, crashing chords are evocative of the "surprise" in Haydn's Symphony No. 94. The last variation demands an instrument tuned with a short octave, making a wider spread of chord possible.

== References, notes and sources ==
Notes

Sources

- Anderson, Keith (1999). "Liner notes to HAYDN: Piano Sonatas Vol. 9. Jenő Jandó. Naxos 8.553826". Naxos Records.
- Anderson, Keith (2006). "Liner notes to HAYDN: Piano Variations. Jenő Jandó. Naxos 8.553972". Naxos Records.
- Head, Matthew (1997). Liner notes to Franz Joseph Haydn: Early Keyboard Works, TROY281. Albany Records.
- Landon, H. C. Robbins, and David Wyn Jones. "Haydn’s music 1766-1780." In Haydn: his life and music, 168. Bloomington: Indiana University Press, 1988.
- Maxwell, Carolyn. Haydn, Solo Piano Literature: A Comprehensive Guide, Annotated and Evaluated with Thematics, edited by Carolyn Maxwell, Charles Shadle and Christine Armstrong. Boulder, Colorado: Maxwell Music Evaluation, 1983.
