= Piano Sonata in E minor =

Piano Sonata in E minor may refer to:

- Piano Sonata No. 27 (Beethoven)
- Piano Sonata (Grieg)
- Piano Sonata Hob. XVI/34 (Haydn)
- Piano Sonata No. 10 (Prokofiev)
- Piano Sonata in E minor, D 566 (Schubert)
- Piano Sonata in E minor, D 769A (Schubert)
