= Piano Sonata in F major =

Piano Sonata in F major may refer to:

- Piano Sonata No. 6 (Beethoven)
- Piano Sonata No. 22 (Beethoven)
- Sonatina in F major (attributed to Beethoven)
- Piano Sonata Hob. XVI/9 (Haydn)
- Piano Sonata No. 2 (Mozart)
- Piano Sonata No. 12 (Mozart)
- Piano Sonata in F major, K. 547a (Mozart)
- Piano Sonata in F major (Sibelius)
