= Fantasy in C major =

Fantasy in C major may refer to:

- Fantasia in C major (Haydn)
- Fantasy for violin and piano (Schubert)
- Wanderer Fantasy by Franz Schubert
- Fantasie in C (Schumann)
