= Piano Sonata Hob. XVI/9 =

Sonata by Joseph Haydn

The Piano Sonata in F major, Hob. XVI/9, L.3, also called a divertimento, was written before 1766 (perhaps in 1758) by Joseph Haydn. The first and last movements are used as the first and fifth movements respectively of the Piano Trio in F major, Hob. XV/39. The minuet of the middle movement is also used as the minuet of the fourth movement of Hob. XV/39.

== Structure ==
I. Allegro

II. Minuet & Trio

III. Scherzo
MIDI rendition by Bernd Krueger

The work has three movements:

1. Allegro
2. Minuet & Trio
3. Scherzo

== Notable recordings ==
- Tom Beghin's The Virtual Haydn: Complete Works for Solo Keyboard.
