= Urtext edition =

Type of edition of classical music

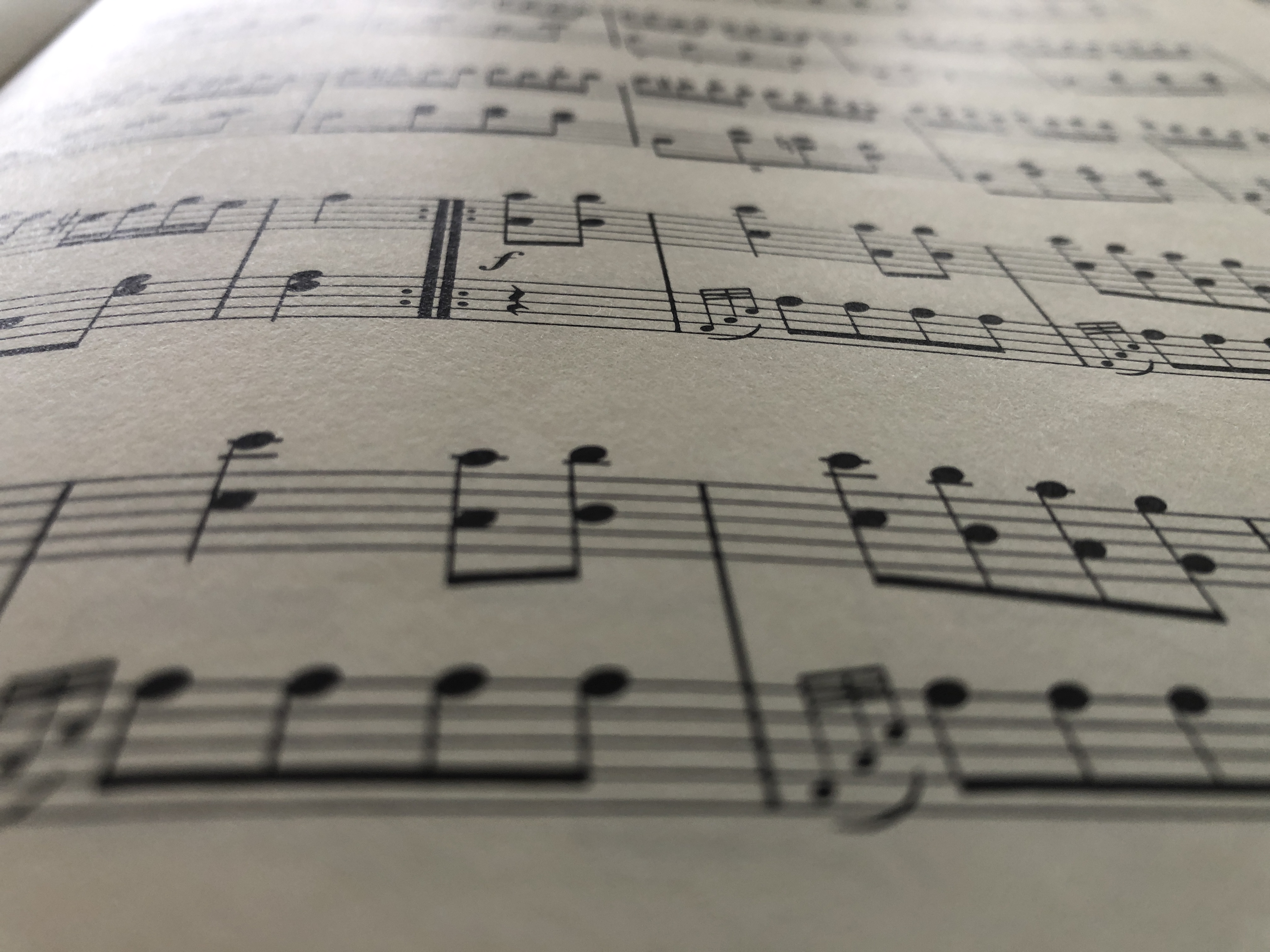
Sample urtext music score from G. Henle Verlag, a publishing house specializing in urtext editions. The work is Mozart's Piano Sonata in A, K. 331.

An urtext edition (from German prefix ur- original) of a work of classical music is a printed version intended to reproduce the original intention of the composer as exactly as possible, without any added or changed material. Other kinds of editions distinct from urtext are facsimile and interpretive editions, discussed below.

== Preparing urtext editions ==
=== Sources ===
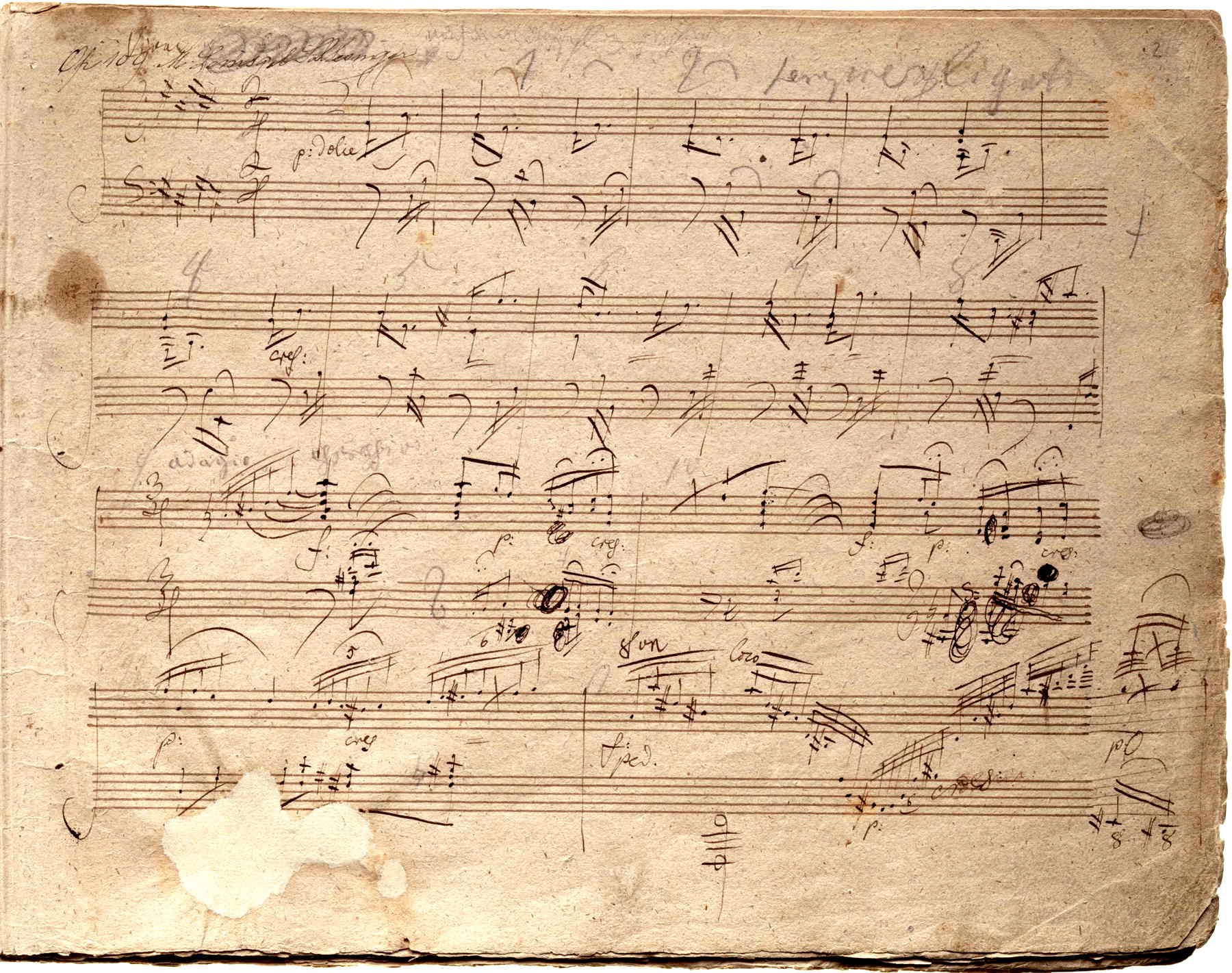
The autograph score (first page) of Beethoven's Piano Sonata in E, op. 109. Click to enlarge.

The sources for an urtext edition include the autograph (that is, the manuscript produced in the composer's hand), hand copies made by the composer's students and assistants, the first published edition, and other early editions. When the editor relies on a first edition, it is sometimes best to rely not on the earliest printed copies, but on later printings. This is because publishers sometimes kept the plates from the earliest printing, reusing them for later printings with corrections from the composer. A particularly valuable source for urtext editions is a copy of the first edition that was hand-corrected by the composer.

An urtext edition will often have a prologue stating which sources the editor used. The editor will provide the academic library or other repository where manuscripts or first editions are stored.

Where the sources are few, or misprint-ridden, or conflicting, the task of the urtext editor becomes difficult. Cases where the composer had bad penmanship (for example, Beethoven) or revised the work after publication, likewise create difficulties.

=== Issues of interpretation and reporting ===
A fundamental problem in urtext editing is how to present variant readings. If the editor includes too few variants, this restricts the freedom of the performer to choose. Yet including unlikely variants from patently unreliable sources likewise serves the performer badly. Where the editor must go farthest out on a limb is in identifying misprints or scribal errors. The great danger—not at all hypothetical—is that an eccentric or even inspired choice on the composer's part will be obliterated by an overzealous editor.

One other source of difficulty arises from the fact that works of music usually involve passages that are repeated (either identically or similarly) in more than one location; this occurs, for instance, in the recapitulation section of a work in sonata form or in the main theme of a rondo. Often the dynamic markings or other marks of expression found in one location in the source material are missing in analogous locations. The strictest possible practice is to render all markings literally, but an urtext editor may also want to point out the markings found in parallel passages.

One common response of editors for all of these difficulties is to provide written documentation of the decisions that were made, either in footnotes or in a separate section of commentary.

== Types of editions ==
=== Facsimile editions ===
Urtext editions differ from facsimile editions, which simply present a photographic reproduction of one of the original sources for a work of music. The urtext edition adds value to what the performer could get from a facsimile by integrating evidence from multiple sources and exercising informed scholarly judgment. Urtext editions are often easier to read than facsimiles, due to poor penmanship or damage to the manuscript in the original document. Thus, facsimile editions are intended mostly for use by scholars, along with performers who pursue scholarship as part of their preparation.

In modern times, digital scans of the composer's manuscript or the first edition are increasingly posted online, by institutions such as the International Music Score Library Project or the Beethoven House in Bonn. Such postings are similar to a facsimile edition but usually lack editorial commentary.

The musicologist James Webster, basing his remarks on his study of two leading urtext editions of Haydn's E flat Piano Sonata, H. XVI:49, suggests that players interested in historically informed performance ought to play from a facsimile. The reason is that some markings made by the composer simply cannot be rendered faithfully in a printed edition. For Haydn, these include marks that are intermediate in length between a dot and a stroke (which evidently have different meanings for this composer), or phrase arcs that end high above the notes, leaving it ambiguous where a phrase begins or ends. In such cases, printed editions are forced to make a choice; only a facsimile can provide an unaltered expression of the composer's intent.

=== Interpretive editions ===
Urtext editions also differ from interpretive editions, which offer the editor's personal opinion on how to perform the work. This is indicated by providing markings for dynamics and other forms of musical expression, which supplement or replace those of the composer. In extreme cases, interpretive editions have deliberately altered the composer's notes or even deleted entire passages. In the 19th and early 20th centuries, many famous performing musicians provided interpretive editions, including Harold Bauer, Artur Schnabel, and Ignacy Jan Paderewski. In the days before recorded music, such editions were often the only way that students could obtain inspiration from the performing practice of leading artists, and even today they retain value for this purpose.

A compromise between urtext and interpretive editing is an edition in which the editor's additions are typographically distinguished (usually with parentheses, size, greyscale or detailed in accompanying prose) from the composer's own markings. Such compromise editions are particularly useful for early music, where the interpretation of the musical notation of long ago often poses difficulties.

== Authenticity ==
Webster has suggested that many editions that are labeled "Urtext" do not really qualify:

The great majority of editions labelled 'Urtext' make many more changes than their editors admit. Publishers are partly to blame; they are afraid of doing anything that might seem unfamiliar or off-putting to any potential market. Indeed they want to have the best of both worlds; for example, the Neue Mozart-Ausgabe claims to offer 'an unexceptionable text from the scholarly viewpoint, which at the same time takes the needs of musical practice into account.' Whether this is a pious hope or frankly based on self-interest, the fact remains that one can't serve two masters.

== Editions currently used ==
William S. Newman suggested (in 1986) that in music teaching, urtext editions have become increasingly favored, though he expressed some ambivalence about this development:

The pronounced swing towards Urtext editions ... is a healthy sign. However, that swing may have gone too far from the student's standpoint. For example, I would almost rather entrust my students to the old Bülow–Lebert edition of Beethoven's [piano] sonatas than to the Urtext, in which Beethoven's inconsistencies, especially in the matter of staccatos, slurs, and dynamic signs, can produce no end of confusion—almost, rather, that is, because the Bülow–Lebert edition ... went too far the other way, not only inserting numerous unidentified changes but also making various details consistent that were never meant to be.

The Bülow–Lebert edition to which Newman refers is a well-known interpretive edition of the sonatas.

Robert Estrin, a piano teacher, favors the use of Urtext editions but notes that their use can be problematic for beginning and intermediate students:

If you’re a serious player, you really want to know what the composer wrote and what the editor added. Otherwise, you might not be faithful to the intentions of the composer. However, Bach, for example, rarely wrote any phrasing or dynamics in his keyboard music. But that doesn’t mean it should be played devoid of expression or phrasing. So having some suggestions from the editor can be a godsend. Even Mozart doesn’t have a lot of expression marks. Sometimes having those markings can be incredibly helpful if you’re a beginner or intermediate student.

Estrin advocates the type of urtext edition described above, in which the editor's markings intended to help performers are given with grey or otherwise distinct typography. He also advocates editions that offer fingerings for keyboard and string players.

== See also ==
- Critical edition
- Diplomatic edition
- Historical editions (music)
- Scholarly method
- For the history of the conflict between interpretive and urtext editions in a widely-performed work, see Messiah (Handel).

== Sources ==
- Del Mar, Jonathan (2006) More about Beethoven in Steiner’s Shop: Publishers’ Corrections to the First Edition of the Quartet in F Minor, op. 95. A tribute to Alan Tyson. Nineteenth-Century Music Review, 3/2: 95–111.
- Newman, William S. (1986) The pianist's problems: a modern approach to efficient practice and musicianly performance. Da Capo Press.
- Tyson, Alan (1962) Beethoven in Steiner's shop. The Music Review pp. 119-127.
- Tyson, Alan (1971) Steps to publication -- and beyond. In Denis Arnold and Nigel Fortune, eds., The Beethoven Companion, pp. 459-492.
- Webster, James (1997) "The triumph of variability: Haydn's articulation markings in the autograph of Sonata No. 49 in E-flat", in Sieghard Brandenburg, ed., Haydn, Mozart, & Beethoven: Studies in the Music of the Classical Period. Essays in Honour of Alan Tyson. Oxford: Clarendon Press.
