= List of string quartets by Joseph Haydn =

Haydn's 68 authentic string quartets

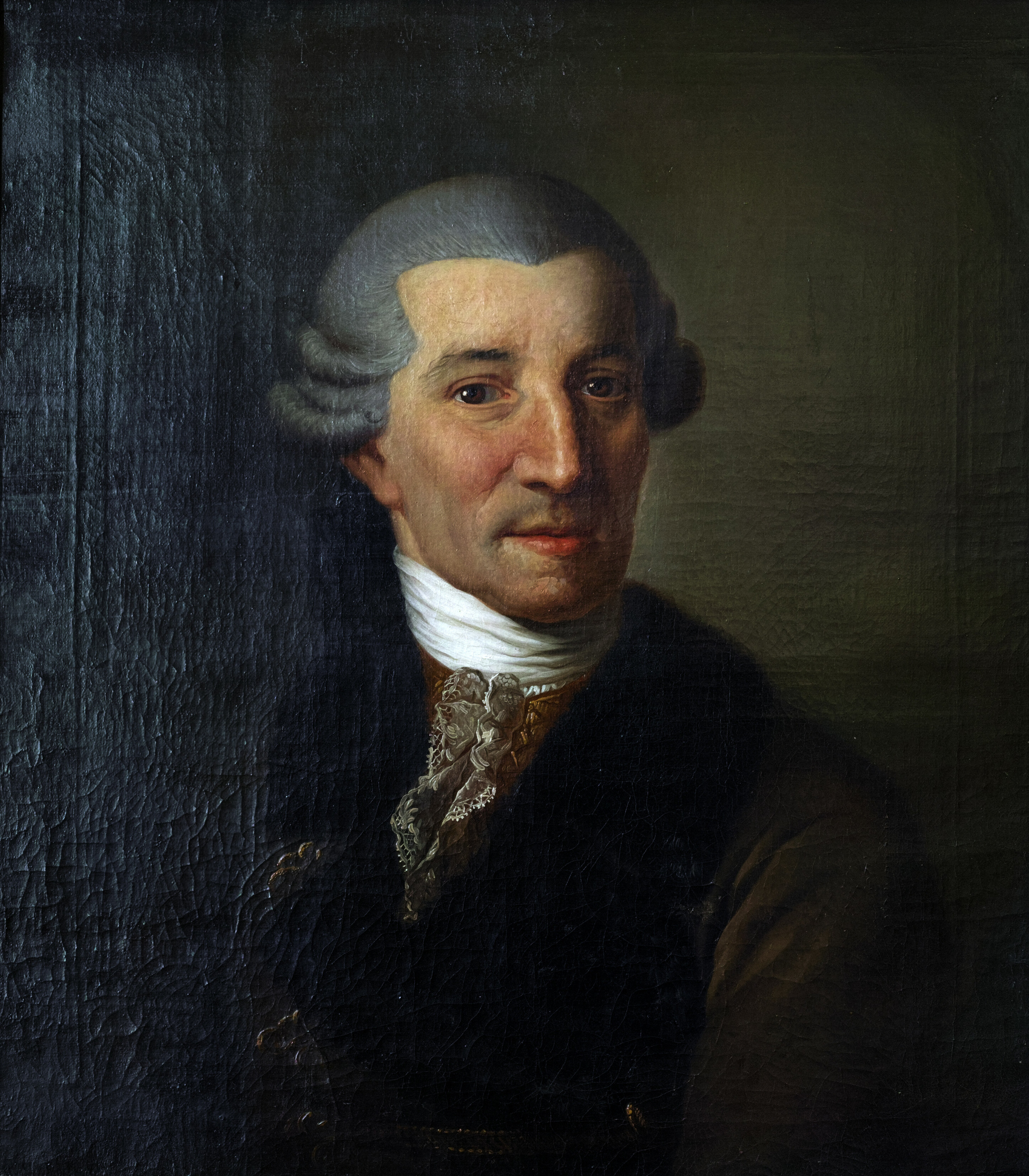
Portrait of Joseph Haydn by Christian Ludwig Seehas, 1785

The Austrian composer Joseph Haydn wrote 68 string quartets. (The number was previously thought to be 83, but this number includes some arrangements and spurious works.) Haydn's string quartets are usually referred to by their opus number, and not by the Dutch musicologist Anthony van Hoboken's catalogue numbers or their publication order in the First Haydn Edition (FHE).

== Opus 1 (1755–1757) ==
Source: "Haydn, (Franz) Joseph". Grove Music Online.

- Quartet No. 1 in B♭ major ("La Chasse"), Op. 1, No. 1, FHE No. 52, Hoboken No. III:1
- Quartet No. 2 in E♭ major, Op. 1, No. 2, FHE No. 53, Hoboken No. III:2
- Quartet No. 3 in D major, Op. 1, No. 3, FHE No. 54, Hoboken No. III:3
- Quartet No. 4 in G major, Op. 1, No. 4, FHE No. 55, Hoboken No. III:4
- Quartet No. 5 in E♭ major, Op. 1, No. 0, Hoboken No. II:6 (also referred to as Opus 0)
- Quartet in B♭ major, Op. 1, No. 5, FHE No. 56, Hoboken No. III:5 (later found to be the Symphony A, Hob. I/107)
- Quartet No. 6 in C major, Op. 1, No. 6, FHE No. 57, Hoboken No. III:6

== Opus 2 (1757–1759) ==
Source: "Haydn, (Franz) Joseph". Grove Music Online.

The two quartets numbered 3 and 5 are spurious arrangements by an unknown composer.

- Quartet No. 7 in A major, Op. 2, No. 1, FHE No. 58, Hoboken No. III:7
- Quartet No. 8 in E major, Op. 2, No. 2, FHE No. 59, Hoboken No. III:8 (often includes a classical guitar)
- Quartet in E♭ major, Op. 2, No. 3, FHE No. 60 (arrangement of Cassation in E-flat major, Hob. II:21), Hoboken No. III:9
- Quartet No. 9 in F major, Op. 2, No. 4, FHE No. 61, Hoboken No. III:10
- Quartet in D major, Op. 2, No. 5, FHE No. 62 (arrangement of Cassation in D major, Hob. II:22), Hoboken No. III:11
- Quartet No. 10 in B♭ major, Op. 2, No. 6, FHE No. 63, Hoboken No. III:12

== Opus 3 (spurious) ==
The Opus 3 quartets are now commonly attributed to the ardent admirer and imitator of Haydn, Romanus Hoffstetter, though there is no universal agreement on this. In the 1980s, Scott Fruehwald claimed to show that the quartets were not by Haydn, based on stylistic analysis. He also concluded that only the first two quartets were by Hoffstetter.

- Quartet in E major, Op. 3, No. 1, FHE No. 64 (spurious), Hoboken No. III:13
- Quartet in C major, Op. 3, No. 2, FHE No. 65 (spurious), Hoboken No. III:14
- Quartet in G major, Op. 3, No. 3, FHE No. 66 (spurious), Hoboken No. III:15
- Quartet in B♭ major, Op. 3, No. 4, FHE No. 67 (spurious), Hoboken No. III:16
- Quartet in F major, Op. 3, No. 5, FHE No. 68 (spurious), Hoboken No. III:17
- Quartet in A major, Op. 3, No. 6, FHE No. 69 (spurious), Hoboken No. III:18

== Opus 9 (1769) ==
- Quartet No. 11 in D minor, Op. 9, No. 4, FHE No. 16, Hoboken No. III:22
- Quartet No. 12 in C major, Op. 9, No. 1, FHE No. 7, Hoboken No. III:19
- Quartet No. 13 in G major, Op. 9, No. 3, FHE No. 9, Hoboken No. III:21
- Quartet No. 14 in E♭ major, Op. 9, No. 2, FHE No. 8, Hoboken No. III:20
- Quartet No. 15 in B♭ major, Op. 9, No. 5, FHE No. 17, Hoboken No. III:23
- Quartet No. 16 in A major, Op. 9, No. 6, FHE No. 18, Hoboken No. III:24

== Opus 17 (1771) ==
- Quartet No. 17 in F major, Op. 17, No. 2, FHE No. 2, Hoboken No. III:26
  1. Moderato
  2. Menuetto: Allegretto
  3. Adagio
  4. Finale: Allegro di molto
- Quartet No. 18 in E major, Op. 17, No. 1, FHE No. 1, Hoboken No. III:25
  1. Moderato
  2. Menuetto: Allegretto
  3. Adagio
  4. Finale: Presto
- Quartet No. 19 in C minor, Op. 17, No. 4, FHE No. 4, Hoboken No. III:28
- Quartet No. 20 in D major, Op. 17, No. 6, FHE No. 6, Hoboken No. III:30
- Quartet No. 21 In E♭ major, Op. 17, No. 3, FHE No. 3, Hoboken No. III:27
- Quartet No. 22 in G major, Op. 17, No. 5, FHE No. 5, Hoboken No. III:29

== Opus 20, the "Sun" quartets (1772) ==
The nickname "Sun" refers to the image of a rising sun on the cover page of the 1779 Hummel edition, the most widely-distributed at the time.

- Quartet No. 23 in F minor, Op. 20, No. 5, FHE No. 47, Hoboken No. III:35
- Quartet No. 24 in A major, Op. 20, No. 6, FHE No. 48, Hoboken No. III:36
- Quartet No. 25 in C major, Op. 20, No. 2, FHE No. 44, Hoboken No. III:32
- Quartet No. 26 in G minor, Op. 20, No. 3, FHE No. 45, Hoboken No. III:33
- Quartet No. 27 in D major, Op. 20, No. 4, FHE No. 46, Hoboken No. III:34
- Quartet No. 28 in E♭ major, Op. 20, No. 1, FHE No. 43, Hoboken No. III:31

== Opus 33, the "Russian" quartets (1781) ==
- Quartet No. 29 in G major ("How Do You Do?"), Op. 33, No. 5, FHE No. 74, Hoboken No. III:41
- Quartet No. 30 in E♭ major ("The Joke"), Op. 33, No. 2, FHE No. 71, Hoboken No. III:38
- Quartet No. 31 in B minor, Op. 33, No. 1, FHE No. 70, Hoboken No. III:37
- Quartet No. 32 in C major ("The Bird"), Op. 33, No. 3, FHE No. 72, Hoboken No. III:39
- Quartet No. 33 in D major, Op. 33, No. 6, FHE No. 75, Hoboken No. III:42
- Quartet No. 34 in B♭ major, Op. 33, No. 4, FHE No. 73, Hoboken No. III:40

== Opus 42 (1785) ==
- Quartet No. 35 in D minor, Op. 42, FHE No. 15, Hoboken No. III:43
  1. Andante ed innocentemente
  2. Menuetto: Allegretto
  3. Adagio e cantabile
  4. Finale: Presto

== Opus 50, the "Prussian" quartets (1787) ==
- Quartet No. 36 in B♭ major, Op. 50, No. 1, FHE No. 10, Hoboken No. III:44
- Quartet No. 37 in C major, Op. 50, No. 2, FHE No. 11, Hoboken No. III:45
- Quartet No. 38 in E♭ major, Op. 50, No. 3, FHE No. 12, Hoboken No. III:46
- Quartet No. 39 in F♯ minor, Op. 50, No. 4, FHE No. 25, Hoboken No. III:47
- Quartet No. 40 in F major ("Dream"), Op. 50, No. 5, FHE No. 26, Hoboken No. III:48
- Quartet No. 41 in D major ("The Frog"), Op. 50, No. 6, FHE No. 27, Hoboken No. III:49

== Opus 51 (1787) ==
- The Seven Last Words of Our Savior on the Cross, Op. 51 (transcription of work written for orchestra), Hob. No. III:50–56

== Opus 54, 55, the "Tost" quartets, sets I & II (1788) ==
Named after Johann Tost, a violinist in the Esterhazy orchestra from 1783 to 1789.

- Quartet No. 42 in C major, Op. 54, No. 2, FHE No. 20, Hoboken No. III:57

I. Vivace

II. Adagio

III. Menuetto: Allegretto

IV. Finale: Adagio – Presto – Adagio
Performed by the Danish String Quartet

1. Vivace
2. Adagio
3. Menuetto: Allegretto
4. Finale: Adagio – Presto – Adagio
- Quartet No. 43 in G major, Op. 54, No. 1, FHE No. 19, Hoboken No. III:58
  1. Allegro con brio
  2. Allegretto
  3. Menuetto: Allegretto
  4. Finale: Presto
- Quartet No. 44 in E major, Op. 54, No. 3, FHE No. 21, Hoboken No. III:59
  1. Allegro
  2. Largo cantabile
  3. Menuetto: Allegretto
  4. Finale: Presto
- Quartet No. 45 in A major, Op. 55, No. 1, FHE No. 22, Hoboken No. III:60
  1. Allegro
  2. Adagio cantabile
  3. Menuetto
  4. Finale: Vivace
- Quartet No. 46 in F minor ("Razor"), Op. 55, No. 2, FHE No. 23, Hoboken No. III:61
  1. Andante o più tosto allegretto
  2. Allegro
  3. Menuetto: Allegretto
  4. Finale: Presto
- Quartet No. 47 in B♭ major, Op. 55, No. 3, FHE No. 24, Hoboken No. III:62
  1. Vivace assai
  2. Adagio ma non troppo
  3. Menuetto
  4. Finale: Presto

== Opus 64, the "Tost" quartets, set III (1790) ==
- Quartet No. 48 in C major, Op. 64, No. 1, FHE No. 31, Hoboken No. III:65
- Quartet No. 49 in B minor, Op. 64, No. 2, FHE No. 32, Hoboken No. III:68
- Quartet No. 50 in B♭ major, Op. 64, No. 3, FHE No. 33, Hoboken No. III:67
- Quartet No. 51 in G major, Op. 64, No. 4, FHE No. 34, Hoboken No. III:66
- Quartet No. 52 in E♭ major, Op. 64, No. 6, FHE No. 36, Hoboken No. III:64
- Quartet No. 53 in D major ("The Lark"), Op. 64, No. 5, FHE No. 35, Hoboken No. III:63

== Opus 71, 74, the "Apponyi" quartets (1793) ==
Count Anton Georg Apponyi, a relative of Haydn's patrons, paid 100 ducats for the privilege of having these quartets publicly dedicated to him.

- Quartet No. 54 in B♭ major, Op. 71, No. 1, FHE No. 37, Hoboken No. III:69
  1. Allegro
  2. Adagio
  3. Menuetto: Allegretto
  4. (Finale): Vivace
- Quartet No. 55 in D major, Op. 71, No. 2, FHE No. 38, Hoboken No. III:70
  1. Adagio – Allegro
  2. Adagio (cantabile)
  3. Menuetto: Allegretto
  4. Finale: Allegretto
- Quartet No. 56 in E♭ major, Op. 71, No. 3, FHE No. 39, Hoboken No. III:71
  1. Vivace
  2. Andante con moto
  3. Menuetto
  4. Finale: Vivace
- Quartet No. 57 in C major, Op. 74, No. 1, FHE No. 28, Hoboken No. III:72
  1. Allegro (moderato)
  2. Andantino (grazioso)
  3. Menuetto: Allegro
  4. Finale: Vivace
- Quartet No. 58 in F major, Op. 74, No. 2, FHE No. 29, Hoboken No. III:73
  1. Allegro spiritoso
  2. Andante grazioso
  3. Menuetto
  4. Finale: Presto
- Quartet No. 59 in G minor ("Rider"), Op. 74, No. 3, FHE No. 30, Hoboken No. III:74
  1. Allegro
  2. Largo assai
  3. Menuetto: (Allegretto)
  4. Finale: Allegro con brio

== Opus 76, the "Erdödy" quartets (1797) ==
- Quartet No. 60 in G major, Op. 76, No. 1, FHE No. 40, Hoboken No. III:75
- Quartet No. 61 in D minor ("Quinten", "Fifths"), Op. 76, No. 2, FHE No. 41, Hoboken No. III:76
- Quartet No. 62 in C major ("Emperor" or "Kaiser"), Op. 76, No. 3, FHE No. 42, Hoboken No. III:77
- Quartet No. 63 in B♭ major ("Sunrise"), Op. 76, No. 4, FHE No. 49, Hoboken No. III:78
- Quartet No. 64 in D major ("Largo" or "Friedhofsquartett"), Op. 76, No. 5, FHE No. 50, Hoboken No. III:79
- Quartet No. 65 in E♭ major, Op. 76, No. 6, FHE No. 51, Hoboken No. III:80

== Opus 77, the "Lobkowitz" quartets (1799) ==
The Opus 77 quartets were commissioned by Joseph Franz von Lobkowitz, and dedicated to him in the first edition. Unlike the other quartets sets this one consists of just two quartets, not six; Haydn unable to complete the remaining ones because of old age and debility.

- Quartet No. 66 in G major, Op. 77, No. 1, FHE No. 13, Hoboken No. III:81
  1. Allegro moderato
  2. Adagio
  3. Menuetto: Presto
  4. Finale: Presto
- Quartet No. 67 in F major, Op. 77, No. 2, FHE No. 14, Hoboken No. III:82
  1. Allegro moderato
  2. Menuet: Presto
  3. Andante
  4. Finale: Vivace assai

== Opus 103 (1803) ==
- Quartet No. 68 in D minor, Op. 103, Hoboken No. III:83 (incomplete). When the two quartets of Opus 77 were published, Haydn retained hopes of writing more, and he did finish the slow movement and minuet that comprise this quartet, but soon, advancing illness blocked all further progress. For three years, Haydn attempted to finish the quartet, often working just fifteen minutes at a time. Finally, in August 1805, Haydn threw in the towel and permitted his friend Georg August Griesinger to forward the unfinished quartet to Breitkopf and Härtel in Leipzig for publication. With the composer's permission, the first edition included a quotation from an earlier song Haydn had written: 'Hin ist alle meine Kraft, Alt und schwach bin ich' (Gone is all my strength, Old and weak am I)'

In 2013, Haydn specialist William Drabkin composed a completion of this quartet.

  1. Andante grazioso
  2. Menuetto ma non troppo presto

== List by keys ==
C	c	D	d	E♭	E	F	f	f♯	G	g	A	B♭	b
1/6 (3/2); 9/1; 20/2; 33/3; 50/2; 54/2; 64/1; 74/1; 76/3	17/4	1/3 (2/5); 17/6; 20/4; 33/6; 50/6; 64/5; 71/2; 76/5	9/4; 42; 76/2; 103	1/2; 1/0 (2/3); 9/2; 17/3; 20/1; 33/2; 50/3; 64/6; 71/3; 76/6	2/2 (3/1); 17/1; 54/3	2/4 (3/5); 17/2; 50/5; 74/2; 77/2	20/5; 55/2	50/4	1/4 (3/3); 9/3; 17/5; 33/5; 54/1; 64/4; 76/1; 77/1	20/3; 74/3	2/1 (3/6); 9/6; 20/6; 55/1	1/1 (1/5); 2/6 (3/4); 9/5; 33/4; 50/1; 55/3; 64/3; 71/1; 76/4	33/1; 64/2

== Recordings of complete cycles ==
Multiple recordings of Haydn's complete string quartets have been made over the years. The first complete set was made by the Aeolian Quartet during the 1970s for Decca, which was then reissued in 2009. From 1994 to 1999, the Angeles Quartet recorded a cycle for Philips Records, which received critical reviews. During the 1990s, the Tátrai Quartet completed a cycle for Hungaroton. From 1989 to 2003, the Kodály Quartet recorded a cycle for Naxos Records. More recently, from 2002 to 2008, the Buchberger Quartet recorded a cycle for Brilliant Classics on period instruments. The Auryn Quartet completed their cycle on modern instruments for Tacet in 2014.
