= Violin Concerto No. 1 (Haydn) =

Violin concerto by Joseph Haydn

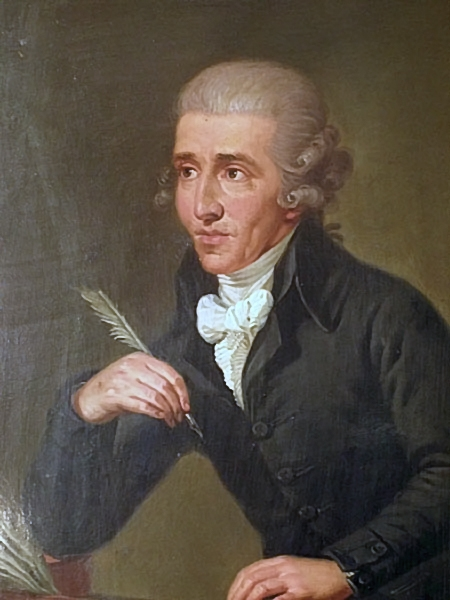
Portrait by Ludwig Guttenbrunn, painted c. 1791–92, of Joseph Haydn c. 1770

The Violin Concerto No. 1 in C major (Hob. VIIa/1) by Joseph Haydn, fatto per il luigi, was written in the 1760s for a well-known violinist of the time, Luigi Tomasini, who was just back from Italy and soon became the concertmaster of the Esterházy orchestra.

None of Haydn's violin concertos exist today in autograph form. This work went unpublished until the mid-twentieth century and has come down to violinists in only eight copies.

== Structure ==
The piece has three movements, each written in sonata form, like the first cello concerto from that time.

1. Allegro moderato
2. Adagio
3. Finale: Presto
