= Piano Sonata Hob. XVI/15 =

The Piano Sonata No. 15 in C major, Hob. XVI/15, is an arrangement for solo keyboard of the 1st, 3rd and 4th movements of the Divertimento in C (Hob. II/11) by Joseph Haydn. This sonata is now considered spurious.
