= Fantasia in C major (Haydn) =

Piano piece written by Joseph Haydn

Joseph Haydn

Fantasia in C major, Hob. XVII/4, "Capriccio", was written by Joseph Haydn. It is based on the Austrian folk song D’ Bäurin hat d'Katz verlor'n ("The farmer's wife has lost her cat").

In March 1789, he wrote to the publishing company Artaria, saying, "In a moment of great good humour I have completed a new Capriccio for fortepiano, whose taste, singularity and special construction cannot fail to receive approval from connoisseurs and amateurs alike. In a single movement, rather long, but not particularly difficult." The fact that Haydn wrote the fantasia "for connoisseurs and amateurs alike" was most likely a nod to C. P. E. Bach's Für Kenner und Liebhaber ("For Connoisseurs and Amateurs") that he had requested from Artaria the year before. However, the piece was more difficult than Haydn thought it would be, with zany virtuosity and orchestral effects, recalling the last movement of his Sonata No. 48.
