= Piano Sonata Hob. XVI/50 =

Sonata by Joseph Haydn

The Piano Sonata in C major, Hob. XVI/50, L.60, was written c. 1794 by Joseph Haydn.

== Structure ==
The work has three movements.

1. Allegro
2. Adagio (in F major)
3. Allegro molto

== History ==
The sonata was written for and dedicated to Therese Jansen Bartolozzi c. 1794. Jansen Bartolozzi subsequently published the sonata in c. 1800 with the title: "A Grand Sonata for the Piano Forte Composed Expressly for and dedicated to Mrs. Bartolozzi by Haydn ... Op. 79 ... London. Printed for, and to be had of the Proprietor 82 Wells Street and of the Publishers J. and H. Caulfield 36 Picadilly."
