= Piano Sonata Hob. XVI/34 =

Composition for keyboard by Joseph Haydn

The Piano Sonata in E minor, Hob. XVI/34, L. 53, was written in the late 1770s by Joseph Haydn and published in London around 1783 by Beardmore & Birchall.

== History ==
Haydn's keyboard sonatas evolved with the development of the keyboard through the late eighteenth century. The harpsichord was eventually replaced with the fortepiano, capable of gradual dynamic changes. The first thirty of Haydn's keyboard sonatas are scored for harpsichord, while the next nine are scored for either harpsichord or fortepiano. This keyboard sonata, being the 34th according to the Hoboken-Verzeichnis classification, is scored for harpsichord or fortepiano, leaving the choice to the performer. The keyboard sonatas written after 1770 show Haydn's increased awareness of the dynamic and timbral possibilities on the fortepiano.

== Structure ==
The work is in three movements:

1. Presto
2. Adagio (G major)
3. Vivace molto

The first movement is in sonata form in 6/8 time and is 127 measures in length. This movement displays Haydn's talent at its most subtle in this lyrical yet dramatic piece. It is described as an unsmiling, precise movement, which is unique in Haydn's sonatas. The movement is a “collection of musical fragments that never seem to gather momentum and, every time they try to, Haydn inserts a full stop and the music suddenly grinds to a halt.” There are several contrapuntal lines occurring simultaneously throughout the piece.

In the contrasting second movement in G major, the time signature has changed to 3/4 time and the movement is a shorter 49 measures in length. The movement can be performed with rubato within the beats, even if the beats themselves are quite regular. The theme in this movement is embellished with rococo arabesques. The movement ends with a deceptive half cadence and modulation to E minor, creating a transition to the finale that ceases on the dominant chord. This is one of the few times in Haydn's sonatas where movements are connected.

The third movement finale, titled "Innocentemente" is in rondo form and is 136 measures long. It has a simple, folk-like theme in E minor, with a recurring E major episode. It uses Alberti bass and has strong harmonic features.
