= Anthony van Hoboken =

Dutch musicologist (1887–1983)

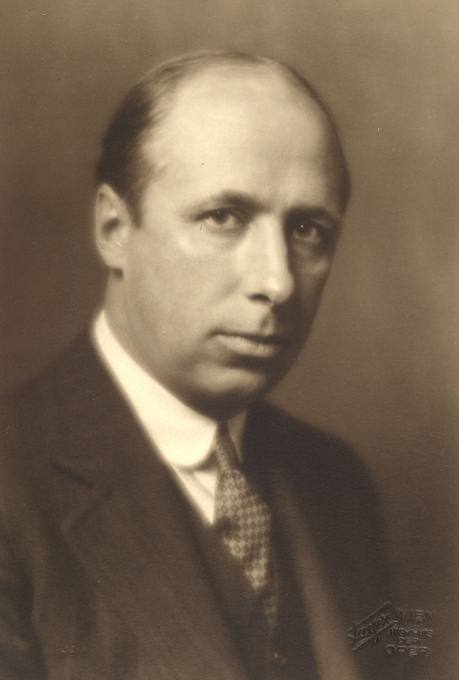
- Portrait by Georg Fayer, c. 1927
- Born: March 23, 1887
- Died: November 1, 1983 (aged 96)
- Education: Technical College of Delft

Anthony van Hoboken (/ˈhoʊboʊkən/ HOH-boh-kən, Dutch: [vɑn ˈɦoːboːkə(n)]; 23 March 1887 – 1 November 1983) was a Dutch musical collector, bibliographer, and musicologist. He became especially well known for his scholarship on the music of Joseph Haydn and in particular for being the creator of the Hoboken catalogue, the standard scholarly catalogue of Haydn's works.

== Life ==
=== 1887–1919 ===
Hoboken was born on 23 March 1887 in Rotterdam to a family that was successful in business, banking, and shipping. He was personally very well off and throughout life his choices were generally made without regard to the need to earn a living. He trained as an engineer (1906–1909) at the Technical College of Delft. Switching to music, he enrolled in 1909 in the Hoch Conservatory in Frankfurt, where he studied harmony with Bernhard Sekles and composition with Iwan Knorr. In 1917 he moved to Munich, where he built his own villa in 1919 and lived in bohemian and intellectual circles.

=== His collection of musical documents ===
Hoboken's wealth enabled him to collect early editions and manuscripts of music from Bach to Brahms. This collection, begun in 1919 under the guidance of the composer Otto Vrieslander, eventually amounted to over 5,000 items, including over 1000 by Haydn. Among the Haydn items were the string quartets Op. 17, 20, 64, and 77; the piano sonata H XVI:49; and seven of the twelve "London" symphonies. Much later (1971), the collection was purchased by the Austrian state and now resides in the Austrian National Library in Vienna.

=== Marriage and studies with Schenker ===
In 1922 Hoboken married Annemarie Seidel (1895–1959), an actress whom he had rescued from ill health resulting from living in the dank basement apartment of her former lover. With Hoboken's wealth the couple led a pleasant lifestyle. Hoboken's friend and teacher Heinrich Schenker later reported a social evening with Hoboken in his Vienna apartment:

At 9 o'clock, to Hoboken (we stay there until 3:45!) ... The Tautenhayn ensemble plays! Not until 11 o'clock does Hoboken tell me that his wife is lying in the hospital, however the matter is not serious. The evening passed extremely well; the complete naturalness in the social gathering, and in our relationship to the musicians; the rooms; the beautiful, sumptuous meal and its presentation (for which we offered the chef a toast, with applause): these made an exceptional impression on us all.

The friendship with Schenker had begun around 1924 (their families vacationed together), and in 1925 Hoboken moved his family to Vienna so he could begin formal study with Schenker. He attended lessons twice a week beginning that year and extending through 1932.

Hoboken's wealth permitted him to provide subventions facilitating the publication of a number of Schenker's works. He was also able to afford his own librarian to maintain his collection of first editions and autographs. For this post he chose Otto Erich Deutsch, another friend of Schenker, who achieved musicological eminence in his own right. Deutsch worked for Hoboken from 1926 to 1935.

=== The Meister-Archiv project ===
In 1927 Schenker and Hoboken undertook a project on behalf of the Austrian National Library to create an archive containing photographic copies of the musical manuscripts of the great composers ("Archiv für Photogramme musikalischer Meisterhandschriften"; "Archive for Photographic Images of Musical Master Manuscripts"). Their appeal to other libraries for participation emphasized two points. First, contemporary editions of the music were rife with interpolated material not in the original (see Urtext edition) and the availability of photographic copies would facilitate the preparation of more accurate editions. Second, they noted that historical manuscripts are vulnerable to destruction or loss. The latter point was prescient, as the Second World War, which broke out twelve years later, resulted in extensive damage and theft in the scholarly archives of Europe; a number of documents survive today solely as a result of the Meister-Archiv project.

=== 1932–1983 ===
In 1932 Hoboken divorced his first wife Seidel (with whom there had been no children) and around 1934 married again to Eva Hommel, a dancer and author whose stage name was Eva Boy; the couple had one child (Anthony Jr., 1937). The financial strains of alimony and a new household lessened what Hoboken could spend on projects involving Schenker, including the photographic archive, and their relationship "soured". Hoboken did, however, write a warm tribute obituary after Schenker's death in 1935.

The Haydn catalog that now bears Hoboken's name (see below) was begun in card format in 1934; work continued until the publication of the third and final book volume in 1978.

When Austria was taken over by Nazi Germany in 1938 (the "Anschluss"), Hoboken moved to Switzerland and remained there for the rest of his life. He lived with his family first in the home of the conductor Wilhelm Furtwängler in St. Moritz; from 1940 to 1950 he lived in Lausanne, and from 1951 to 1977 in Ascona. In 1977 he moved to Zürich, where he died on 1 November 1983, at the age of 96.

== The Hoboken catalog ==
His greatest accomplishment, the work of over forty years, was the "Hoboken catalog", or more formally Joseph Haydn, Thematisch-bibliographisches Werkverzeichnis. This is a catalogue, nearly 2000 pages in length, that brought order to the incompletely-grasped musical output of Joseph Haydn. The catalog proved influential and Haydn's works today are often referred to by the "Hoboken number" (usually abbreviated to "Hob" or just "H") by which they are designated in this catalogue.

King and Gemert offer assessment of the work in the New Grove:

The first volume, devoted to the instrumental works, was criticized for lack of information about manuscript sources. Nevertheless, Hoboken's protracted study established the corpus of Haydn's huge output, dealt with the problem of arrangements and supposititious works and generally brought order and identity to a vast area where much confusion, contention and uncertainty reigned for 150 years. All future Haydn scholarship will be in Hoboken's debt. He achieved for Haydn what Köchel did for Mozart [see Köchel catalogue] and this too in a generation of vastly higher bibliographical standards.

== Honors ==
Hoboken's services to scholarship were recognized early on in 1932, when he received the Grosse Silberne Ehrenzeichen from the government of Austria; later on would follow multiple honorary degrees, a knighthood, and so on.

== Influence ==
Proksch attributes some influence to Hoboken in the revival of Haydn's critical reputation in the 20th century, not only as a result of the systematizing work of his catalog, but also in his influence on his teacher Schenker (whose own influence on musical scholarship in general was very substantial). Schenker in his earliest Haydn studies had relied on inaccurate editions and benefited from his free access to Hoboken's collection of Haydn manuscripts. When Hoboken wrote to Schenker in 1927 that he had finished the boxing and indexing of his Haydn collection, Schenker replied with a deeply appreciative letter that foretold the later rise of Haydn's critical fortunes:

You may take well-earned satisfaction in having so advanced Haydn's cause with your very beautiful collection of first editions. Would God but grant that strokes of good luck kept pace with what you are striving for, which we all still owe Haydn -- where on earth could his things be hiding! ... No doubt that Haydn who today has sunk to the level of child-performers, will one day rise again from the children to the adults, as basically the rarest and most adult people of all belong to his circle.
