= Piano Sonata Hob. XVI/33 =

Sonata by Joseph Haydn

The Piano Sonata in D major, Hob. XVI/33, L. 34, was written in possibly 1777 by Joseph Haydn.

== History ==
This sonata was first officially published in London in 1783 by Beardmore & Birchall without Haydn’s knowledge, but copies had been circulating for several years earlier. Haydn seemed to have made the piece not technically challenging, most likely due to the increased demand for pieces for amateur keyboard players in the 1770s. Haydn’s keyboard sonatas evolved with the development of the keyboard through the late eighteenth century. The harpsichord was eventually replaced with the fortepiano, capable of gradual dynamic changes. The first thirty of Haydn’s keyboard sonatas are scored for harpsichord, while the next nine are scored for either harpsichord or fortepiano. This keyboard sonata, being the 33rd according to the Hoboken-Verzeichnis classification, is scored for harpsichord or fortepiano, leaving the choice to the performer. The keyboard sonatas written after 1770 show Haydn’s increased awareness of the dynamic and timbral possibilities on the fortepiano.

== Structure ==
I. Allegro

II. Adagio

III. Menuet
Performed by Bernd Krueger

The work has three movements:

1. Allegro
2. Adagio (D minor)
3. Menuet

The first movement is in 2/4 time and 193 measures in length. It opens with arpeggios, and is elaborately figured with Alberti bass, scales, thirds, and ornamentation. It also makes use of broken triads, double notes, octaves, and trills.

The second movement is in D minor in 3/4 time, and is 52 measures long. It is described as a slow arioso with many dramatic pauses and tempo fluctuations. The last bar of this movement is fragmentary, and does not have a bar line, nor a fermata to indicate the end of the movement. Instead, it is completed by the upbeat of the finale, moving into a faster tempo but with the same time signature of 3/4. This is one example of the few times that Haydn connects movements in his sonatas.

The finale is 88 measures long and is in a double variation form. There are two themes, one major and one minor, which contrast effectively and lend themselves to development. The variations consist of many lively figurations, including fast scales and arpeggios divided between the left and right hands.
