= Marianna Auenbrugger =

Austrian pianist and composer

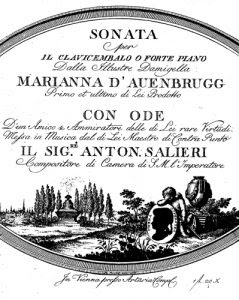
Dedication page of Auenbrugger's Sonata and Antonio Salieri's 'Ode De si piacevoli,’ published upon the occasion of her death.

Marianna Auenbrugger (19 July 1759 – 25 August 1782) was an Austrian pianist and composer.

== Biography ==
Born in Vienna, Auenbrugger was the daughter of the physician Leopold Auenbrugger. She was a highly regarded pianist and composer in Vienna. Together with her sister Caterina Franziska, she was a student of Joseph Haydn and Antonio Salieri. In 1780, Haydn dedicated a cycle of six sonatas to the two sisters (Hob XVI :35-39 and 20).

When Auenbrugger died in 1782, Salieri, at his own expense, published her Keyboard Sonata in E-flat together with his own funeral Ode de si piacevoli.
