= Artaria =

Viennese music publishing firm

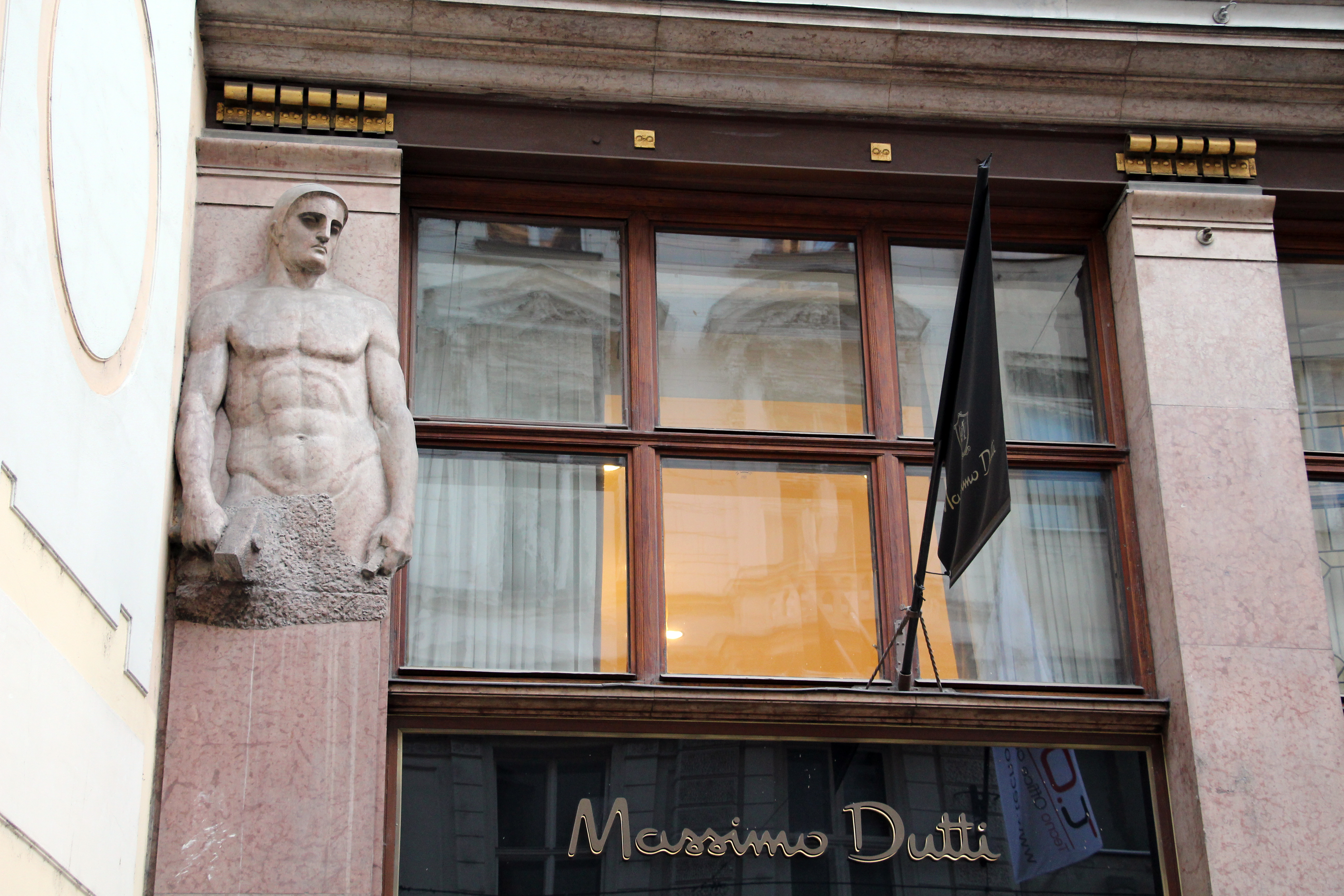
Artaria House, current picture of Art Nouveau building once occupied by Artaria & Co

Artaria & Co. (Italian pronunciation: [artaˈriːa]) was one of the most important music publishing firms of the late 18th and 19th century. Founded in the 18th century in Vienna, the company is associated with many leading names of the classical era like Haydn, Mozart, Beethoven and Schubert.

== History ==
Artaria & Co. was founded as a publishing house for art and maps by Carlo Artaria (1747–1808) in 1770 in Vienna, then the capital of the Habsburg monarchy. The Artaria family were art dealers, building the firm with commissioned work and imported art engravings from around Europe. The company then expanded its business to include music in 1776, an easy transition due to their focus in art engraving helping with the special skills required for music engraving. Within two years the first edition marked with the Artaria imprint was published in the Wiennerisches Diarium.

== Notable Figures ==
Artaria's most important early collaboration was with the Austrian composer Joseph Haydn, who published more than 300 works through them, including many of the composer's string quartets (such as the Opus 33), which were a popular seller. The value of Haydn's works helped push Artaria to the top of the music publishing world in the late 18th century.

This important relationship helped Artaria secure the rights to the works of other important classical composers such as Luigi Boccherini and, most notably, Wolfgang Amadeus Mozart.

During his lifetime, Artaria was Mozart's principal publisher, although after his death this passed to the German house of Breitkopf & Härtel. Starting in 1793, Artaria published several early works of Ludwig van Beethoven, until a bitter dispute over the publishing rights of Beethoven's String Quintet Op. 29 which culminated in a court case from 1803 until 1805. Yet, Artaria also published Beethoven's Hammerklavier Sonata in 1819 and Carlo's nephew Matthias (1793–1835) published the composer's Große Fuge in 1827.

Other important names that had works published by Artaria include Gluck, Clementi, and Salieri.

== Legacy ==
Artaria's dispute with Beethoven highlights the role the company played in helping determine early copyright laws. Voluminous correspondence is extant between Artaria and its clients regarding ownership and royalty of editions as well as piracy concerns.

Artaria continued to be a leading publisher through the 19th century, until it finally ceased its music publication business in the twentieth century. Its cartographic publishing was acquired by Freytag & Berndt in 1920 and the Artaria publishing house was dissolved in 1932. The art dealership closed in 2012.

== See also ==
- History of music publishing

== Notable editions ==
- Ridgewell, Rupert M.: "Artaria's music shop and Boccherini's music in Viennese musical life"; Early Music – Volume 33, Number 2, May 2005, pp. 179–189
