= H. C. Robbins Landon =

American musicologist (1926–2009)

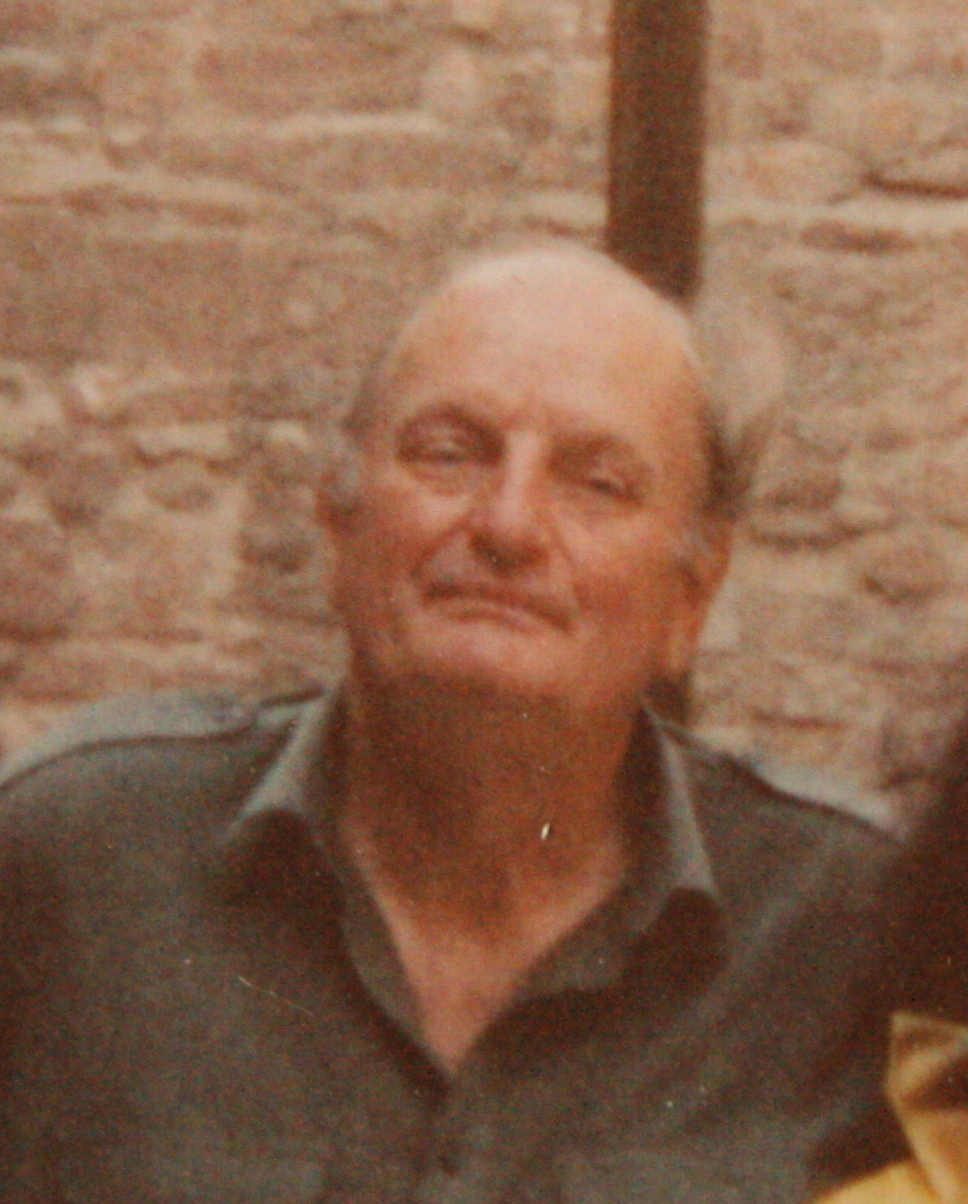
Landon in 1989

Howard Chandler Robbins Landon (March 6, 1926 – November 20, 2009) was an American musicologist, journalist, historian and broadcaster, best known for his work in rediscovering the huge body of neglected music by Haydn and in correcting misunderstandings about Mozart.

The son of a musician, Landon became enthusiastic about Haydn's compositions in high school and was eager to pursue a career in Haydn scholarship. He studied with, among others, Karl Geiringer, an authority on Haydn, graduating with a music degree in 1947. He moved to Europe, where he lived for the rest of his life. He co-founded the Haydn Society in 1949, the goal of which was to publish and record Haydn's works. Gaining access to archives in countries throughout Europe, he spent decades researching the life and works of Haydn. He rescued, published critical editions of, wrote books about, and with the society arranged for the recording of, numerous forgotten works. He finally published his five-volume study, Haydn: Chronicle and Works, between 1976 and 1980.

In addition to his work on Haydn, Landon and the society recorded neglected works of Mozart, and he published five popular books about Mozart, dispelling myths about the composer's life. He had written 28 books by 1996. Landon also wrote regularly for music magazines and newspapers, especially the longest-established London paper, The Times. He was a popular broadcaster for the BBC on radio and television and was praised for his ability to enthuse general audiences with his chosen subject. From the 1970s, he was a sought-after lecturer and held appointments with colleges in the US and the UK.

== Life and career ==
=== Early years ===
Landon was born in Boston, Massachusetts, the son of William Grinnell Landon, a writer of Huguenot descent, and his wife Dorothea LeBaron née Robbins, a musician. He was educated at Aiken Preparatory School, Lenox School for Boys and Asheville School. While at the last he discovered the music of Haydn, which became his lifelong study.

Haydn in 1791

[M]y music teacher there was a guy called Mathias Cooper. I told him of my great enthusiasm for these Haydn symphonies and that I would love to work in music. He told me that if that was the case I should certainly concentrate on Haydn. So I asked him "Why Haydn?" and he told me that Haydn needed a Gesamtausgabe. I said, "What's a Gesamtausgabe?" He explained that it was a complete edition of a composer's works and everyone has one: Mozart, Beethoven, Brahms, even Buxtehude. But not Haydn. I asked him why and he told me that forty years ago the German publisher Breitkopf and Härtel started to collect all Haydn's works, but got bogged down. It was too expensive and nobody cared. So that was what I had to do and he'd show me why. Whereupon he got out a brand new recording of Beecham conducting Symphony No 93. We listened to it and I said, "Professor, you mean there are more symphonies like this? They must be out of their minds!" He said, "Exactly!"

Most of Haydn's music had been neglected for many years. In the first half of the nineteenth century Robert Schumann wrote of him, "Today it is impossible to learn anything new from him. He ... has ceased to arouse any particular interest." At the end of the century, Hubert Parry said that musicians need not be ashamed of knowing only a few of Haydn's symphonies "for Haydn is scarcely himself in this most important branch of composition till this very late period of his life." Of Haydn's output of more than 750 works, only a tenth was available in print in the mid-twentieth century.

Landon determined to concentrate his studies on Haydn. In pursuit of this goal, he "would learn several instruments, and study orchestration, harmony, several foreign languages, and history". From 1943 to 1945 he was a student at Swarthmore College, studying music theory with Alfred Swan, composition with Harl McDonald and English literature with W. H. Auden. His studies at Swarthmore ended when its Quaker administrators expelled him for an affair with a female student. From 1945 to 1947 Landon was at Boston University, studying music with Hugo Norton and Karl Geiringer, who was described by The Times as "the great Haydn scholar". Landon graduated with a Bachelor of Music degree in 1947.

=== Europe ===
After graduating, Landon planned to go on to Harvard University to take a master's degree, but in the interim he decided to go to Europe for the summer of 1947. While there he secured a job as foreign music correspondent for the Intercollegiate Broadcasting System. Recognizing that he would shortly be conscripted for two years' military service, Landon sought out the U.S. Army of Occupation in Vienna and volunteered as a military historian, researching and documenting the role of the Fifth Army in liberating Italy. This move gave him practical experience in handling primary sources and enabled him to remain in Vienna, writing, performing and researching.

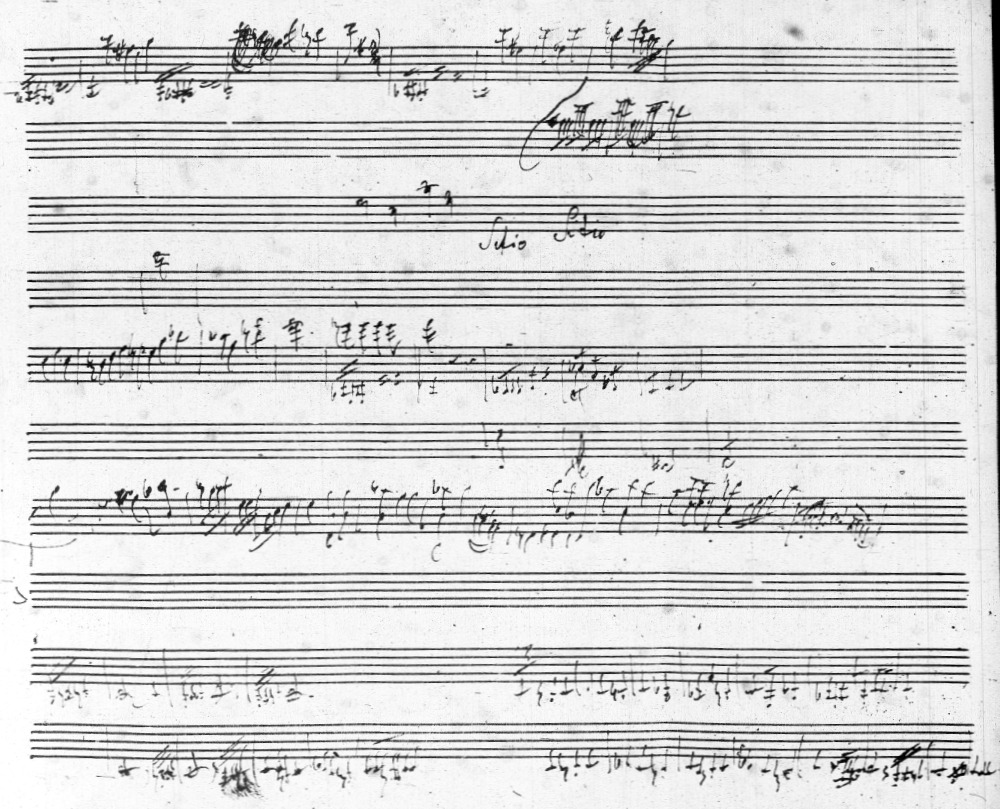
Haydn manuscript (The Seven Last Words of Christ)

In 1949 Landon married the harpsichordist and scholar Christa Fuhrmann, (Note: Two obituarists state that he had been married before, but other cited sources say that this marriage was his first.) completed his military service, and returned to Boston to undertake postgraduate research. While there, he and a group of friends, including Geiringer, founded the Haydn Society. They had two aims: to publish a new complete edition of the composer's works, and to make as many of his works as possible available on record. Their first set of records, issued within the year, was the Harmoniemesse of 1802. (Note: The set featured Trude Konrad, soprano; Imgard Dornbach-Ziegler, contralto; Ludwig von Haas, tenor; Heinrich Seebach, bass; Karl Otto Bortzi, organ; and the Munich Cathedral Choir. It was conducted by Ludwig Berberich.) It sold out almost immediately. A legacy from an uncle in 1949 enabled him to return to Vienna, where he organized an ambitious program of recording, while continuing to search for forgotten Haydn scores in archives in central Europe. He remained secretary of the Haydn Society, which operated from Vienna rather than Boston after his move.

The society issued recordings of symphonies and masses that had previously been unavailable on disc. It also published the first recordings of Mozart's Great Mass in C minor and Idomeneo. Landon travelled through central and eastern Europe in search of Haydn manuscripts. He edited critical editions of Haydn's music, principally the operas and masses, scarcely known at the time.

Among his discoveries were the manuscripts of Haydn's opera L'anima del filosofo, that was first performed in 1951.

His first book, The Symphonies of Joseph Haydn, appeared in 1955. The book established the chronology of the symphonies, analyzed the scores, and discussed their role in 18th-century music and in Haydn's output as a whole. Landon could turn his scholarship to practical effect. The horn players of the Vienna Philharmonic struggled to reach the high notes in Haydn's unfamiliar Symphony No. 56; Landon established that Haydn's horns had been designed to play in a range an octave higher, and arranged for replicas to be made.

=== Writer and lecturer ===
Landon wrote for many publications, including Musical America, but he said that his most important association was with The Times in London. He wrote for that paper from the early 1950s, and found its accreditation particularly useful in gaining access to archives behind the Iron Curtain. In 1957 he was appointed the paper's "special correspondent", a post he held until 1961. He became a frequent broadcaster, first on BBC radio, and later on television, where he was praised for his appeal to experts and lay people alike.

Between 1976 and 1980, Landon produced his five volume magnum opus, Haydn: Chronicle and Works. The New Grove Dictionary of Music and Musicians rates this and Landon's 1955 book on the symphonies as "major landmarks in Haydn studies". The reviewer in The Times, referring to the second volume, wrote, "Witty, enthralling and humane, it fulfils expectations in every possible way".

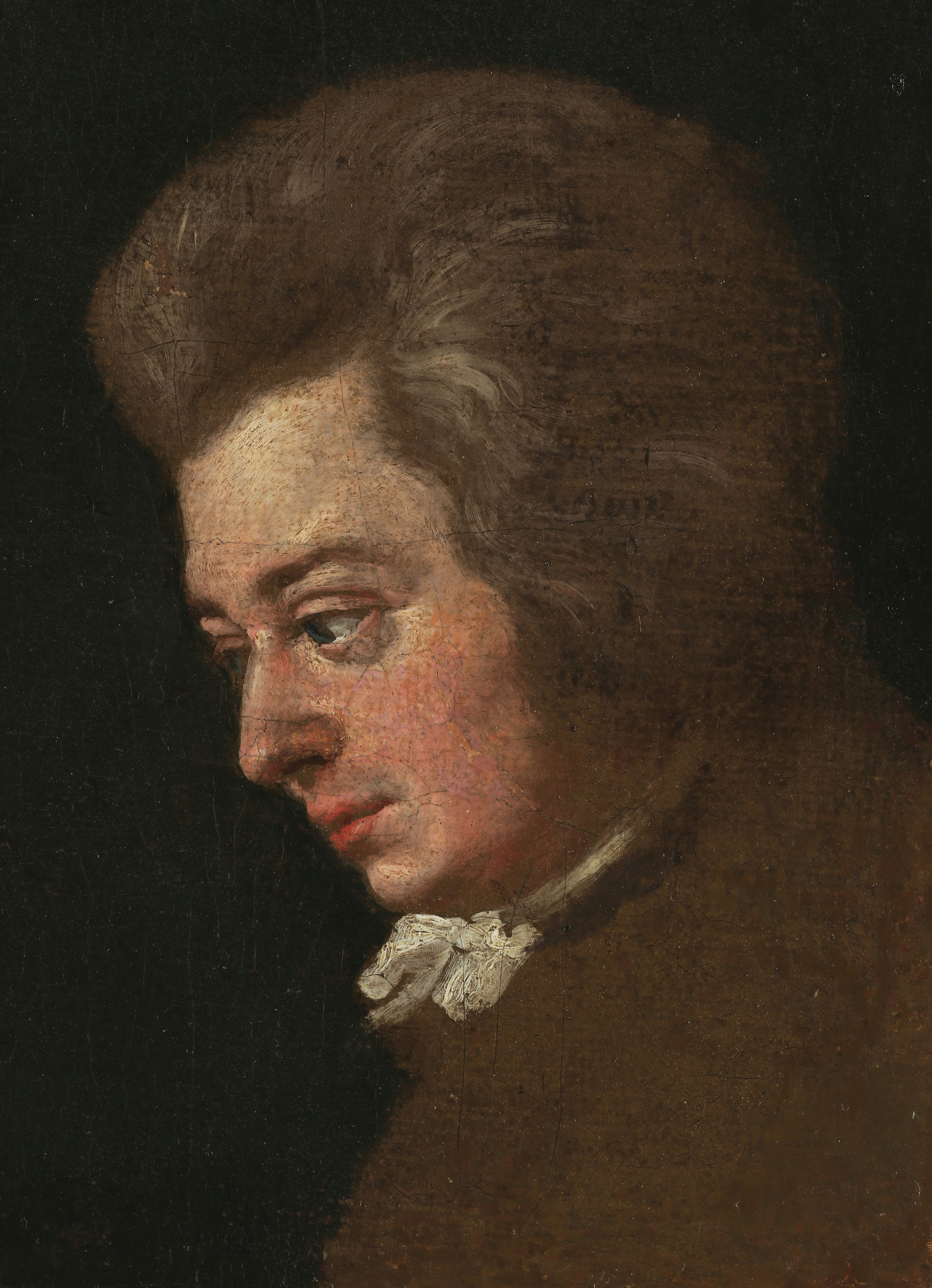
Mozart c. 1782-1783

Landon did not confine his scholarship to the study of Haydn. His five books on the life and music of Mozart were aimed at a wider public than his works about Haydn, and sold in large numbers in many languages, making his name internationally known. In the wake of long-standing myths about Mozart, and new perceptions of him created by the 1979 play and 1984 film Amadeus, Landon set out the facts. He rescued Mozart's fellow-composer Salieri from the charge of poisoning his rival, and restored the reputation of Mozart's wife, Constanze, long thought of as "a scatterbrained, lascivious woman, incapable of understanding Mozart and encouraging him to live a disorderly, if not dissolute, existence."

After discovering a copy of the Jena Symphony under the name of composer Friedrich Witt in the Göttweig Abbey archives, Landon dispelled the previous widely held belief that the symphony was an early work of Beethoven.

In Europe and America, Landon was sought after as a lecturer. In the 1960s, '70s and '80s he held professorial posts at Queens College, New York; the University of California; University College, Cardiff University; and Middlebury College, Vermont. His scholarship was not invariably beyond reproach. In 1993, by failing to carry out rudimentary checks, he was duped by a forgery of six "Haydn" piano sonatas. When venturing outside his sphere of special expertise he was sometimes criticized for lacking scholarly precision; Grove instances his books on Vivaldi, J. C. Bach and Beethoven. He was helped in his researches by many assistants, whose work he was scrupulous about acknowledging. Among his helpers were his first wife, Christa, with whom he continued to collaborate after their divorce in the mid-1950s, and his second wife, the historian Else Radant, whom he married in 1957.

=== Later years ===
Having made his home at various times in his career in Austria, Italy and Britain, Landon settled in 1984 at the Château de Foncoussières, Rabastens, Tarn, in southern France. Separated from his second wife in 1994, he spent his later years with a companion, Marie-Noelle Raynal-Bechetoille.

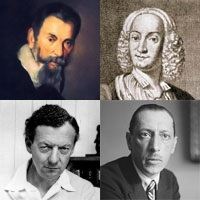
From top left, clockwise: Monteverdi, Vivaldi, Stravinsky and Britten

In 1990 Landon collaborated with the writer and broadcaster John Julius Norwich in presenting a five-part television series about Venice's musical heritage under the title Maestro. They presented episodes on "Venice and the Gabrielis", "The World of Claudio Monteverdi", "Venice and Vivaldi", "Verdi and Venetian Theatre", and "20th-Century Music in Venice", the last of which, including works by Stravinsky and Britten, was far away from Landon's usual musical territory.

Landon never formally retired, but in an interview he gave two years before his death, he said that he no longer did any research: "I do a few corrections, that kind of thing. But in effect I'm retired. I'm 81, so I'm allowed to retire."

Landon died at Rabastens, at the age of 83.

== Reputation and honors ==
The New York Times said of Landon, "Though a serious and prolific scholar, Mr. Landon also had a knack for making musicology seem exciting to the general public." Charles Rosen, in a review of Landon's five-volume Haydn compendium, expressed admiration and gratitude to the author for his energy in bringing all of Haydn's music, particularly the complete symphonies, to publication: "Only a few decades ago there were still immense tracts of unexplored Haydn. ... That we are better off today is owing in large part to the work of Robbins Landon." However, he faults Landon for haphazard scholarship and analysis, observing that "much of what he writes is sensitive and penetrating, and it is all informed by a great love of Haydn and an enthusiasm which would be infectious if the book were not so disorganized and unsystematic. ... He writes like a man going quickly through the pages of Haydn's works and pointing out to a friend the passages he likes most."

Landon was granted honorary doctorates by Boston University (1969), Queen's University, Belfast (1974), Bristol University (1981) and the New England Conservatory (1989), and was an honorary fellow of Lady Margaret Hall, Oxford, (1980). He was awarded the Siemens Prize (1991) and the Medal of Honor of the Handel and Haydn Society (1993). He was elected to the American Philosophical Society in 1991. He received the Verdienstkreuz für Kunst und Wissenschaft from the Austrian Government in 1972 and the Gold Medal of the City of Vienna in 1987.

== Publications ==
Landon's output was huge; a tribute volume published for his 70th birthday in 1996 contained a bibliography listing 516 publications by him, including 28 books. In his Who's Who entry Landon selected as his major publications:

- The Symphonies of Joseph Haydn, 1955
- The Mozart Companion (co-ed with Donald Mitchell), 1956
- The Collected Correspondence and London Notebooks of Joseph Haydn, 1959
- Critical edition of the 107 Haydn Symphonies, completed 1968
- Essays on Eighteenth-Century Music, 1969
- Ludwig van Beethoven: A Documentary Study, 1970
- Haydn: Chronicle and Works, 1976–80:
  - vol. 3, Haydn in England, 1976
  - vol. 4, Haydn: The Years of The Creation, 1977
  - vol. 5, Haydn: The Late Years, 1977
  - vol. 1, Haydn: The Early Years, 1978
  - vol. 2, Haydn in Eszterhaza, 1980
- Haydn: A Documentary Study, 1981
- Mozart and the Masons, 1982
- Handel and his World, 1984
- 1791: Mozart's Last Year, 1988
- Haydn: His Life and Music (with David Wyn Jones), 1988
- Mozart: The Golden Years, 1989
- The Mozart Compendium (ed), 1990
- Mozart and Vienna, 1991
- Five Centuries of Music in Venice, 1991
- Vivaldi: Voice of the Baroque, 1993
- The Mozart Essays, 1995
- Horns in High C (memoirs), 1999
- Scholarly editions of eighteenth-century music (various European publishing houses)
