= Hoboken catalogue =

Catalogue of musical compositions

The Hoboken catalogue is a catalogue of the musical compositions by Joseph Haydn compiled by Anthony van Hoboken. It is intended to cover the composer's entire oeuvre and includes over 750 entries. Its full title in the original German is Joseph Haydn, Thematisch-bibliographisches Werkverzeichnis ("Joseph Haydn, thematic-bibliographic catalogue of works"). The Haydn catalogue that now bears Hoboken's name was begun in card format in 1934; work continued until the publication of the third and final book volume in 1978.

Works by Haydn are often indicated using their Hoboken catalogue number, typically in the format "Violin Concerto No. 1 in C major, Hob. VIIa:1".

== The catalogue ==
The catalogue is a massive work; a currently available version runs to 1936 pages. Each work is given with an identifying incipit, printed on a single musical line. There is discussion of manuscript sources, early editions, listing in previous catalogues (including the two Haydn prepared), and critical commentary.

== Organization ==
Catalogues of composers' works typically follow either a chronological arrangement (sorting by date of composition) or a sorting by musical genre. Hoboken's catalogue is of the latter type; thus the symphonies, for example, are in category I, all string quartets are in category III, keyboard sonatas are in category XVI, and so on.

| Hob. | Category |
|---|---|
| I | Symphonies (1–108) |
| Ia | Overtures (1–17) |
| II | Divertimenti in 4 and more Parts (1–47) |
| III | String Quartets (1–83) |
| IV | Divertimenti in 3 Parts (1–11) |
| V | String Trios (1–21) |
| VI | Various Duos (1–6) |
| VII | Concertos for Various Instruments |
| VIII | Marches (1–7) |
| IX | Dances (1–31) |
| X | Various Works for Baryton (1–12) |
| XI | Trios for Baryton, Violin (or Viola) and Cello (1–126) |
| XII | Duos with Baryton (1–24) |
| XIII | Concertos for Baryton (1–3) |
| XIV | Divertimenti with Keyboard (1–13) |
| XV | Trios for Keyboard, Violin (or Flute) and Cello (1–41) |
| XVa | Keyboard Duos (1–3) |
| XVI | Piano Sonatas (1–52) |
| XVII | Keyboard Pieces (1–12) |
| XVIIa | Keyboard 4 Hands (1–2) |
| XVIII | Keyboard Concertos (1–11) |
| XIX | Pieces for musical clock (Flötenuhr) (1–32) |
| XX | Versions of The Seven Last Words of Christ (1–4) |
| XXa | Stabat Mater |
| XXI | Oratorios (1, 2, 3) |
| XXII | Masses (1–14) |
| XXIIa | Requiem |
| XXIIb | Libera me |
| XXIII | Other Sacred Works |
| XXIV | Cantatas (1–11) and Arias (1–23) with Orchestra |
| XXV | Songs with 2 (1–2), 3 (1–5), and 4 (1–9) Parts |
| XXVI | Lieder with Piano (1–48) and Cantatas with Instruments (1–4) |
| XXVII | Canons (Sacred 1–10; Secular 1–47) |
| XXVIII | Operas (1–13) |
| XXIX | Marionette Operas (1–5) and Singspiele (1–3) |
| XXX | Incidental Music (1–5) |
| XXXI | Arrangements of Scottish (1–273) and Welsh (1–61) and other (1–17) Folksongs |
| XXXII | Pasticcios (1–4) |

== See also ==
- List of compositions by Joseph Haydn
- H. C. Robbins Landon
