= List of diplomatic missions in the Czech Republic =

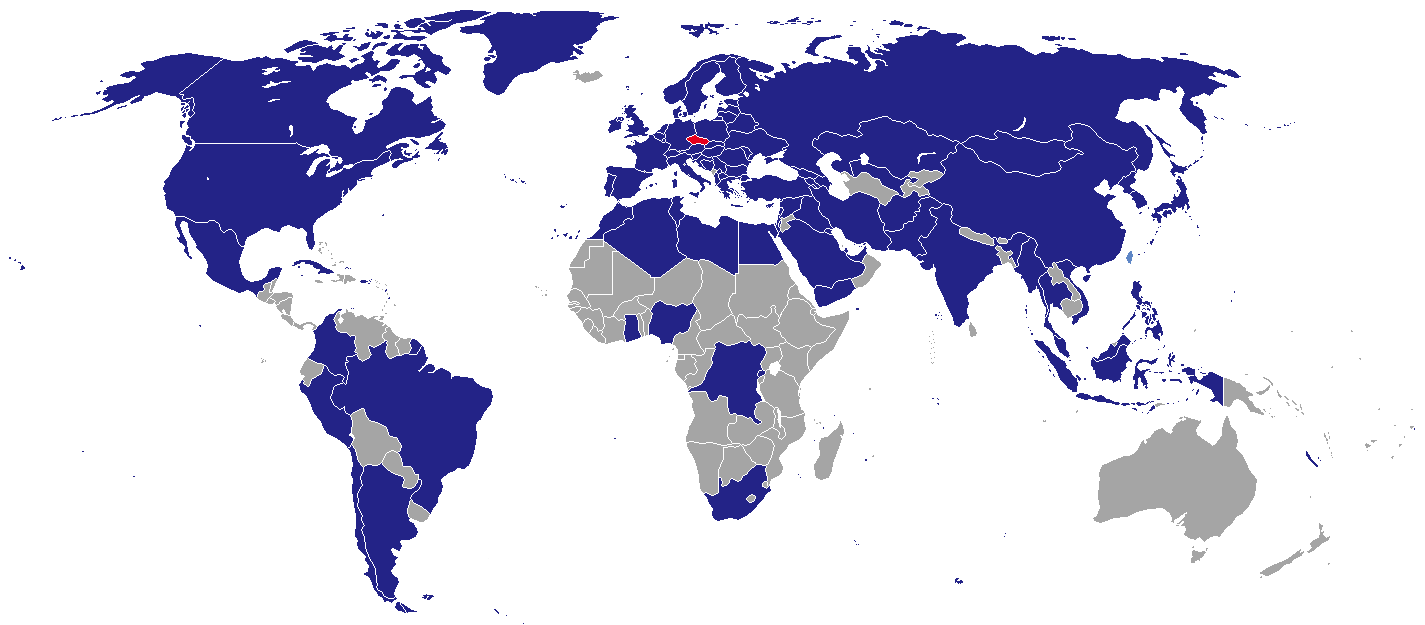
Map of diplomatic missions in the Czech Republic

This article lists diplomatic missions resident in the Czech Republic, also known as Czechia. At present, the capital city of Prague hosts 90 embassies. Several other countries have missions accredited from other capitals, mostly in Vienna, Berlin, and Moscow.

Embassies in Prague are mostly located in historical palaces of Malá Strana - one of the city's historical and oldest boroughs, or in residential areas of Bubeneč or Střešovice northwest from the city's historical centre.

Honorary consulates, trade missions, and cultural centers are omitted from this listing.

== Diplomatic missions in Prague ==
Country	Mission type	Photo
Afghanistan	Embassy	
Albania	Embassy	
Algeria	Embassy	
Argentina	Embassy	
Armenia	Embassy	
Austria	Embassy	
Azerbaijan	Embassy	
Belarus	Embassy	
Belgium	Embassy	
Bosnia and Herzegovina	Embassy	
Brazil	Embassy	
Bulgaria	Embassy	
Canada	Embassy	
Chile	Embassy	
China	Embassy	
Colombia	Embassy	
Congo-Kinshasa	Embassy	
Croatia	Embassy	
Cuba	Embassy	
Cyprus	Embassy	
Denmark	Embassy	
Egypt	Embassy	
Estonia	Embassy	
Finland	Embassy	
France	Embassy	
Georgia	Embassy	
Germany	Embassy	
Ghana	Embassy	
Greece	Embassy	
Holy See	Apostolic Nunciature	
Hungary	Embassy	
India	Embassy	
Indonesia	Embassy	
Iran	Embassy	
Iraq	Embassy	
Ireland	Embassy	
Israel	Embassy	
Italy	Embassy	
Japan	Embassy	
Kazakhstan	Embassy	
Kosovo	Embassy	
Kuwait	Embassy	
Latvia	Embassy	
Lebanon	Embassy	
Libya	Embassy	
Lithuania	Embassy	
Luxembourg	Embassy	
Malaysia	Embassy	
Mexico	Embassy	
Moldova	Embassy	
Mongolia	Embassy	
Morocco	Embassy	
Myanmar	Embassy	-
Netherlands	Embassy	
Nigeria	Embassy	
North Korea	Embassy	
North Macedonia	Embassy	
Norway	Embassy	
Pakistan	Embassy	
Palestine	Embassy	
Peru	Embassy	
Philippines	Embassy	
Poland	Embassy	
Qatar	Embassy	
Portugal	Embassy	
Romania	Embassy	
Russia	Embassy	
Rwanda	Embassy	
Saudi Arabia	Embassy	
Serbia	Embassy	
Slovakia	Embassy	
Slovenia	Embassy	
South Africa	Embassy	
Republic of Korea	Embassy	
Sovereign Military Order of Malta	Embassy	
Spain	Embassy	
Sweden	Embassy	
Switzerland	Embassy	
Syria	Embassy	
Republic of China (Taiwan)	Taipei Representative Office	-
Thailand	Embassy	
Tunisia	Embassy	
Turkey	Embassy	
Ukraine	Embassy	
United Arab Emirates	Embassy	-
United Kingdom	Embassy	
United States	Embassy	
Uzbekistan		
Vietnam	Embassy	
Yemen	Embassy	

== Other posts ==
- European Union (Delegation)
- Republic of China (Taiwan) (Economic & Cultural Office)

== Consulates in the Czech Republic ==
Country	Mission type	City	Photo
Dominican Republic	Consulate-General	Prague	
Poland	Consulate-General	Ostrava	
Russia	Consulate-General	Brno	
Russia	Consulate-General	Karlovy Vary	
Ukraine	Consulate	Brno	

== Non-resident embassies ==
=== Resident in Berlin, Germany ===
1. Angola
2. Bahrain
3. Bangladesh
4. Burundi
5. Cambodia
6. Chad
7. Cape Verde
8. Congo-Brazzaville
9. Costa Rica
10. Djibouti
11. Ecuador
12. El Salvador
13. Equatorial Guinea
14. Eritrea
15. Ethiopia
16. Guinea
17. Iceland
18. Ivory Coast
19. Jamaica
20. Kenya
21. Laos
22. Madagascar
23. Malawi
24. Mauritania
25. Mauritius
26. Mozambique
27. Namibia
28. Nepal
29. New Zealand
30. Niger
31. Panama
32. South Sudan
33. Tajikistan
34. Tanzania
35. Togo
36. Uganda
37. Venezuela
38. Zambia

=== Resident in Brussels, Belgium ===
1. Eswatini
2. Gambia
3. Samoa
4. Seychelles
5. Solomon Islands

=== Resident in Moscow, Russia ===
1. Cameroon
2. Sierra Leone
3. Somalia

=== Resident in Vienna, Austria ===
1. Bolivia
2. Burkina Faso
3. Dominican Republic
4. Guatemala
5. Honduras
6. Jordan
7. Kyrgyzstan
8. Liechtenstein
9. Montenegro
10. Oman
11. Paraguay
12. Sri Lanka
13. Turkmenistan
14. Uruguay

=== Resident elsewhere ===
1. Andorra (Andorra la Vella)
2. Australia (Warsaw)
3. Botswana (London)
4. Comoros (Moroni)
5. Gabon (Libreville)
6. Guinea-Bissau (Lisbon)
7. Guyana (London)
8. Lesotho (Rome)
9. Mali (Rome)
10. Malta (Valletta)
11. Nicaragua (Madrid)
12. San Marino (City of San Marino)
13. Senegal (Warsaw)
14. Singapore (Singapore)
15. Zimbabwe (Geneva)

== Missions to open ==
- Montenegro

== Former embassies ==
- Costa Rica
- Sudan (Closed in 2018)
- Uruguay (Closed in 2011)
- Venezuela

== See also ==
- Foreign relations of the Czech Republic
- Visa requirements for Czech citizens
