= Variations in F minor =

Work for piano composed by Joseph Haydn

The Andante with variations in F minor (Hoboken XVII:6), also known as Un piccolo divertimento, is a work for piano composed by Joseph Haydn in 1793.

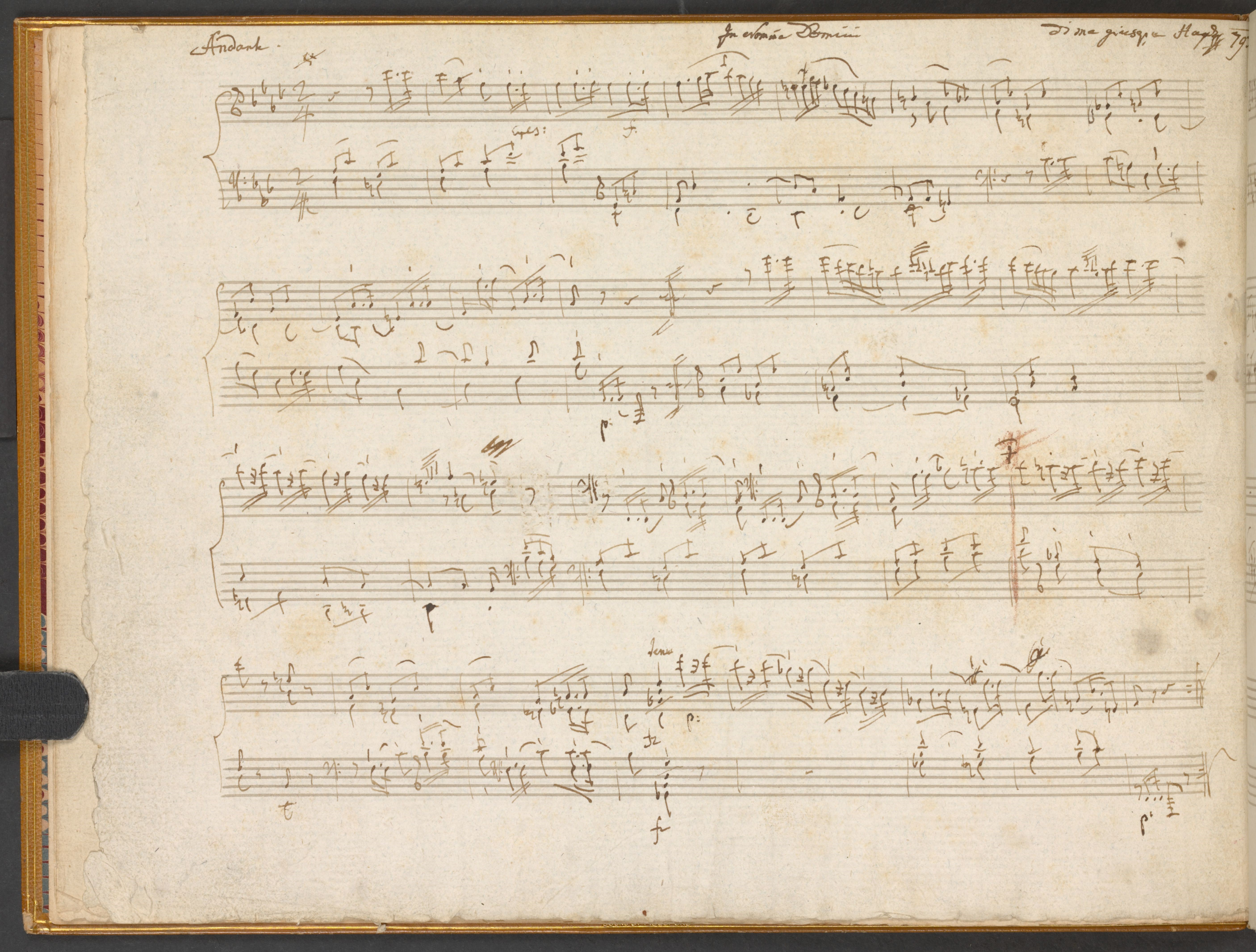
First page of Haydn's Variations in F minor, Hob. VII:6 (manuscript located in the New York Public Library for the Performing Arts)

== Musical form ==
The work takes the form of a set of double variations, a musical form particularly favored by Haydn. The first theme is in F minor and the second theme in F major. Each theme is in two parts, with each part repeated. After the two themes are played, both are varied, with two variations of each, arranged alternatingly. Once the variations are complete, the first theme returns in its original form, though without repeats. It is not played completely but interrupted near the end by an extended coda, which concludes the work.

The coda is heard by many as expressing anguish; for instance, James Leonard describes it as an "enormous and heartrending coda, a rhapsodic outpouring of grief and rage that ultimately collapses into a quiet, final leave-taking at the end." The critic Richard Wigmore describes the coda in more technical terms as follows:

[Haydn] appended a long, disturbingly chromatic coda that draws unsuspected force from the pervasive dotted rhythms before dissolving in a feverish swirl of arpeggios. After a measure of equilibrium is restored, the dotted rhythms toll deep in the bass, like a funeral knell.

Wigmore elsewhere mentions a widely noted theory about why Haydn wrote the long coda:

Haydn was the least confessional of composers. But it is not far-fetched to suggest, as several commentators have done, that the tragic intensity of the coda may have been prompted by the sudden death of Maria Anna von Genzinger, at the age of forty-two, on 26 January 1793.

Genzinger had been a close (Platonic) friend of Haydn, probably the closest friend in his lifetime, to whom he had addressed a series of sometimes confessional letters. The idea that the coda was provoked by the news of Frau von Genzinger's death was first advanced by Robbins Landon (1955). A skeptical response was offered by Elaine Sisman (1982:472).

== Composition history ==
The history of the work suggests that, if the theory above is correct that the work commemorates the death of Maria Anna von Genzinger, it originated before that event. First, the manuscript form of the work has an entirely different dedicatee, namely Antonia Ployer, whose niece Barbara Ployer was a distinguished pianist of the time. Second, the title Haydn made up for the work, "Un piccolo divertimento," "a little divertimento," seems hardly in keeping with the extremely serious material with which the work ends. Lastly, the work actually has two possible codas, both published, for instance, in the Henle Urtext edition of the work (Gerlach 2007). The original coda is just five bars long, a keyboard flourish in F major that ends the work on an upbeat note. The far more substantial coda performed today was added as a "working score" to an existing "fair copy" (Gerlach).

The original manuscript bears the heading "Sonata"; this is interpreted by Gerlach and others to mean that the work had originally been intended as the first movement of a multi-movement piano sonata (cf. the "Razor" Quartet for strings, Op. 55 no. 2, where the first of four movements is a set of double variations in F minor). This purpose presumably was given up after the new coda was composed.

The completed work was not published until 1799. The earlier dedication to Antonia Ployer was replaced by one to Baroness Josepha von Braun, who about ten years later was to receive the dedication of four works by Beethoven.

== Manuscript ==
The manuscript of the Variations is owned by the Music Division of The New York Public Library for the Performing Arts. For the bicentennial of Haydn's death in 2009, G. Henle Verlag published a facsimile of the manuscript.

== Assessment ==
The F minor variations are one of Haydn's most esteemed works. It was the last of his seven sets of keyboard variations, and the late British composer and pianist John McCabe called it Haydn's "most extended and most resourceful such work for the keyboard." James Leonard, cited above, writes "Not only is the Andante con variazioni the deepest and most profound set of variations for piano composed between Bach and Beethoven, it is Haydn's greatest work for piano and one of the high points of his entire oeuvre." The musicologist Dean Sutcliffe wrote "every critic seems to agree that this is one of the greatest pieces of music ever written."

The work attracted attention even during the Romantic era, when Haydn's music was somewhat in eclipse. John Field performed it in 1832 in London, in commemoration of the centenary of Haydn's birth. The celebrated virtuoso Ignaz Paderewski performed the work (his performance is accessible on line), and created his own edition of it.

The work is widely performed and recorded today. Performances on the modern grand piano by leading artists are widely available, and these can now be compared with performances on the fortepiano of Haydn's time. Examples of the latter include recordings by Paul Badura-Skoda, Kristian Bezuidenhout, Bart van Oort, Christine Schornsheim and Andreas Staier.

== Works cited ==
- David Ewen, Encyclopedia of Concert Music. New York; Hill and Wang, 1959.
- Gerlach, Sonja, ed. (2007) Haydn: Piano pieces/Piano variations. Munich: G. Henle Verlag.
- Robbins Landon, H. C. (1955) The Symphonies of Joseph Haydn, London: Barrie and Rockliff.
- Lorenz, Michael (2006) New and Old Documents Concerning Mozart's Students Barbara Ployer and Josepha Auernhammer. Eighteenth-Century Music, vol. 3, No. 2, September (Cambridge University Press), 311-22
- Proksch, Bryan (2015) Reviving Haydn: New Appreciations in the Twentieth Century. Rochester, N.Y.: University of Rochester Press.
- Sisman, Elaine R. (1982) "Small and Expanded Forms: Koch's Model and Haydn's Music." The Musical Quarterly 68, no. 4: 444-475.
- Sutcliffe, W. Dean (2023) "What Is Haydn Doing in a John Field Nocturne?", Music Analysis 42: 163-187.
- Wigmore, Richard (2009) Haydn. London: Faber and Faber.
