= Dolní Lukavice =

- Municipality
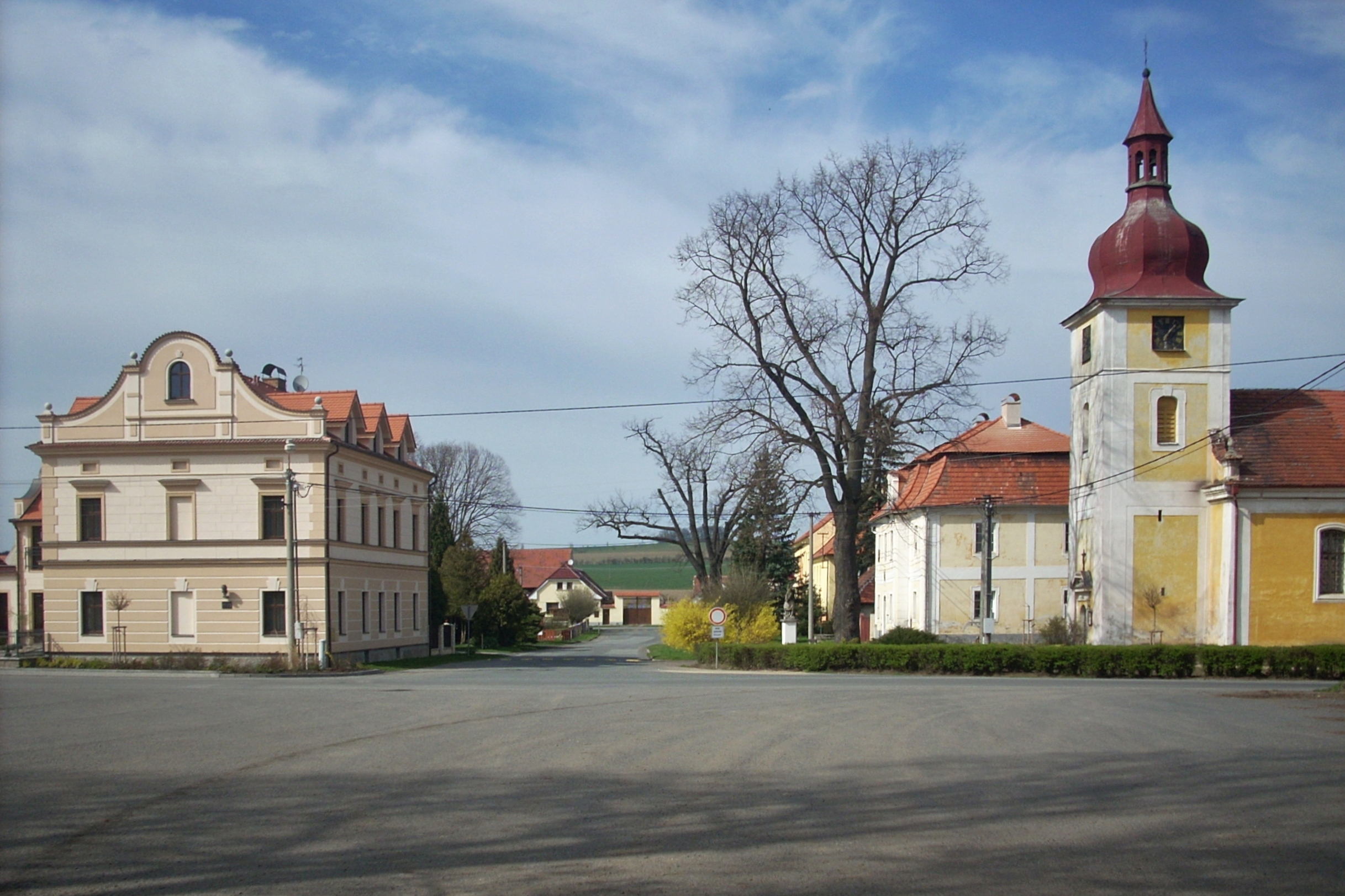
- Centre of the village

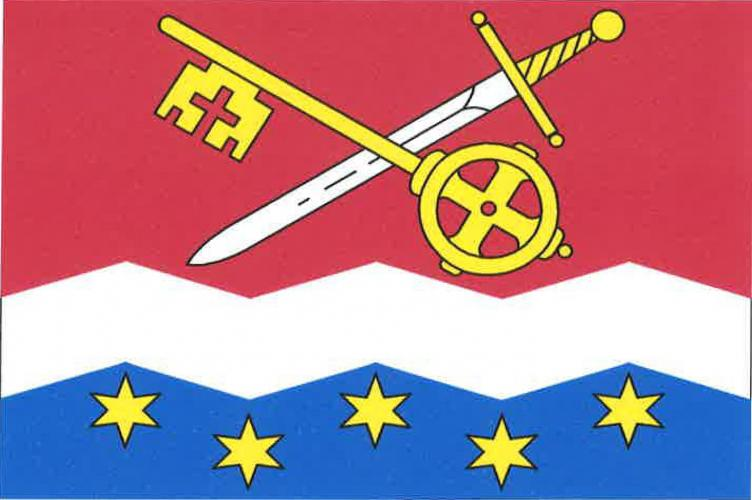
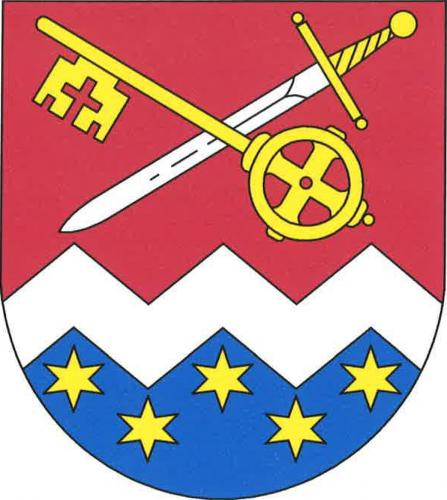
- Flag Coat of arms

- Location in the Czech Republic
- Coordinates: 49°36′10″N 13°20′2″E
- Country: Czech Republic
- Region: Plzeň
- District: Plzeň-South
- First mentioned: 1216

Area
  - Total: 18.73 km^{2} (7.23 sq mi)
- Elevation: 355 m (1,165 ft)

Population (2026-01-01)
  - Total: 1,085
  - Density: 57.93/km^{2} (150.0/sq mi)
- Time zone: UTC+1 (CET)
  - Summer (DST): UTC+2 (CEST)
- Postal codes: 334 01, 334 44
- Website: www.dolni-lukavice.cz

Dolní Lukavice (German: Unter-Lukawitz, Unterlukawitz) is a municipality and village in Plzeň-South District in the Plzeň Region of the Czech Republic. It has about 1,100 inhabitants.

== Administrative division ==
Dolní Lukavice consists of four municipal parts (in brackets population according to the 2021 census):

- Dolní Lukavice (631)
- Krasavce (88)
- Lišice (190)
- Snopoušovy (121)

== Etymology ==
The name Lukavice is derived from the Old Czech adjective lukavá, and originally referred to the local watercourse. The word lukavá has an unclear meaning. According to various theories, it could mean 'crooked' or 'wild', or has its origins in East Slavic languages.

== Geography ==
Dolní Lukavice is located about 14 kilometres (9 mi) south of Plzeň. It lies on the border between the Plasy Uplands and Švihov Highlands. The highest point is the hill Hájsko at 524 m (1,719 ft) above sea level. The Úhlava River flows through the municipality.

== History ==
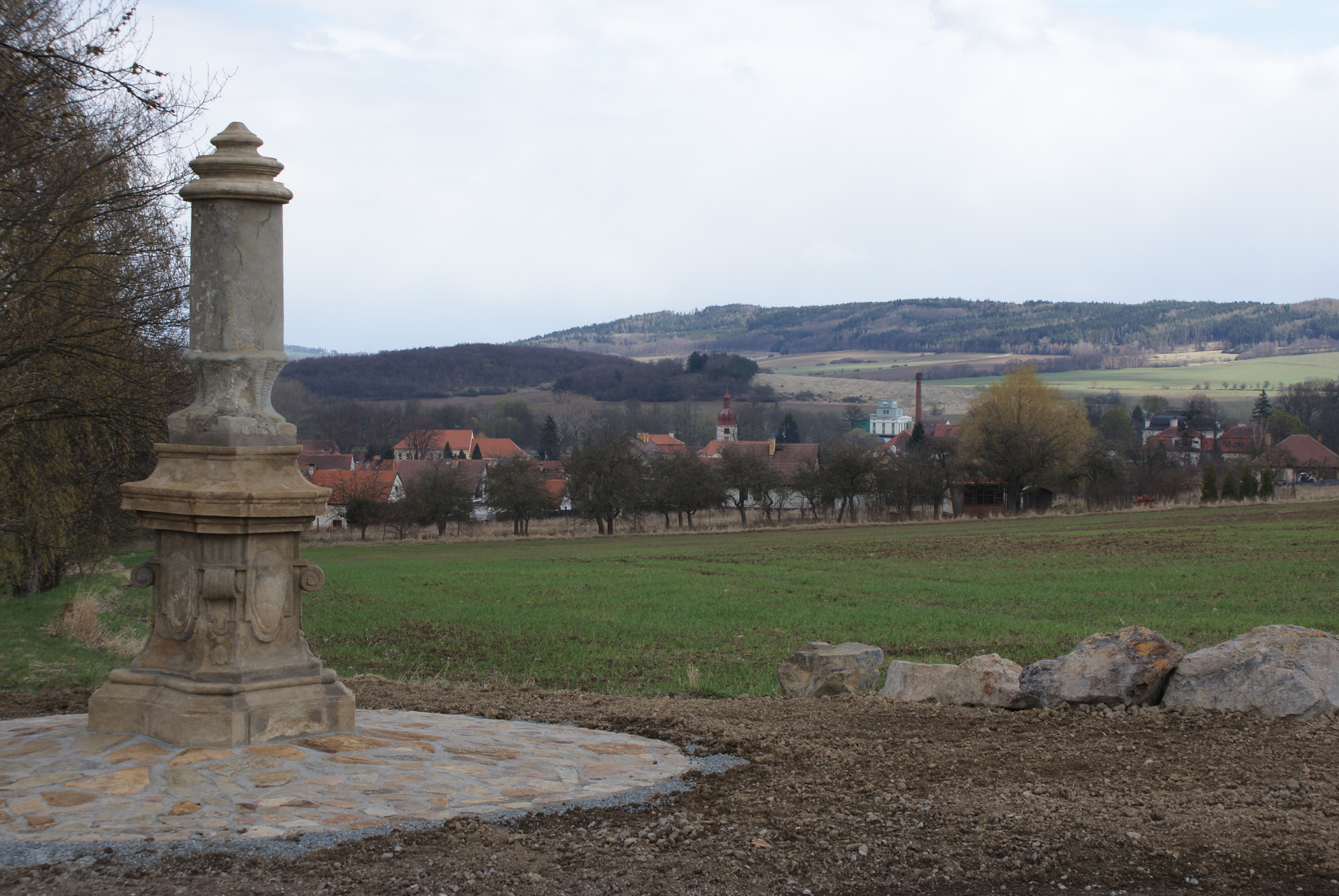
View of Dolní Lukavice

The first written mention of Dolní Lukavice is from 1216. From the mid-15th century until 1596, the village was in possession of the Lukavský of Řenče family. The most notable owners of Dolní Lukavice was the Morzin family, who bought it in 1666. They had the old local fortress demolished and had a new Baroque castle built. They held the estate until 1780, when Count Karl Joseph of Morzin sold it to Count Karel Bedřich of Hatzfeld.

During the mid-18th century, the Morzin family was very musical, and in the late 1750s they hired the young composer Joseph Haydn to serve as their Kapellmeister (music director), leading the family's small orchestra. Haydn followed the Morzins back and forth in their annual migrations: summers in Dolní Lukavice (referred to as "Lukavec" in most Haydn biographies), and winters in the imperial capital of Vienna.

== Demographics ==
Historical population

Year	Pop.	±%
1869	1,500	—
1880	1,598	+6.5%
1890	1,543	−3.4%
1900	1,610	+4.3%
1910	1,639	+1.8%

Year	Pop.	±%
1921	1,702	+3.8%
1930	1,558	−8.5%
1950	1,244	−20.2%
1961	1,253	+0.7%
1970	1,118	−10.8%

Year	Pop.	±%
1980	927	−17.1%
1991	773	−16.6%
2001	761	−1.6%
2011	842	+10.6%
2021	1,030	+22.3%

Source: Censuses

== Transport ==
The I/27 road (the section from Plzeň to Klatovy, here part of the European route E53) runs through the western part of the municipal territory.

== Sights ==
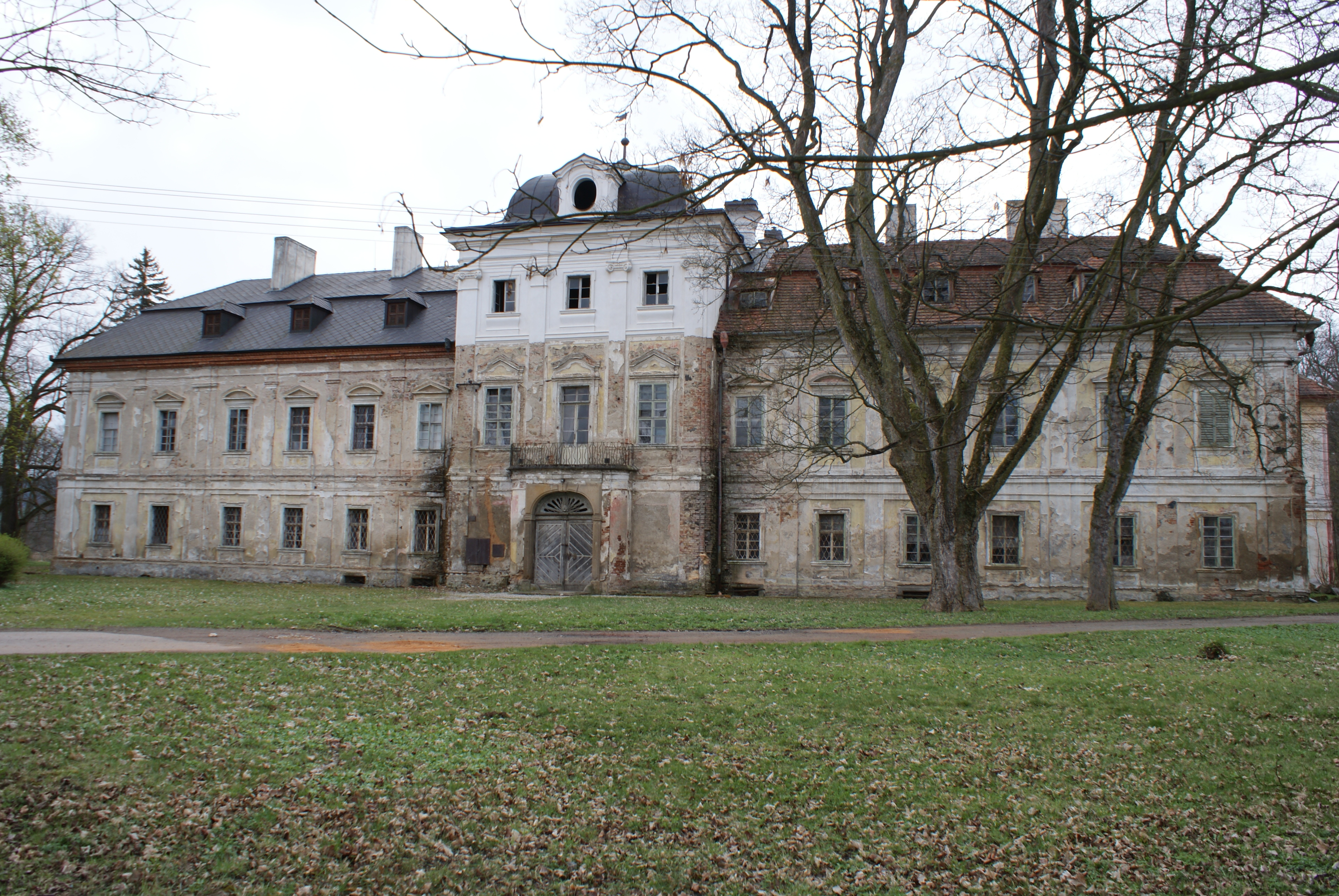
Dolní Lukavice Castle

Dolní Lukavice is known for the Dolní Lukavice Castle (also called Morzin Palace). It was built according to design of Jakub Auguston in 1707–1728. It is surrounded by a large English park. Today the palace is in poor condition and empty.

The Church of Saints Peter and Paul was built in the early Gothic style around 1340 and first documented in 1352. In the second half of the 15th century, late Gothic modifications were made, and in 1722, the church was rebuilt in the Baroque style probably by Jakub Auguston.
