= Morzin Palace, Dolní Lukavice =

Country estate in the Czech Republic

The Morzin Palace (Czech: Morzinský palác) is a country estate in Dolní Lukavice, Czech Republic.

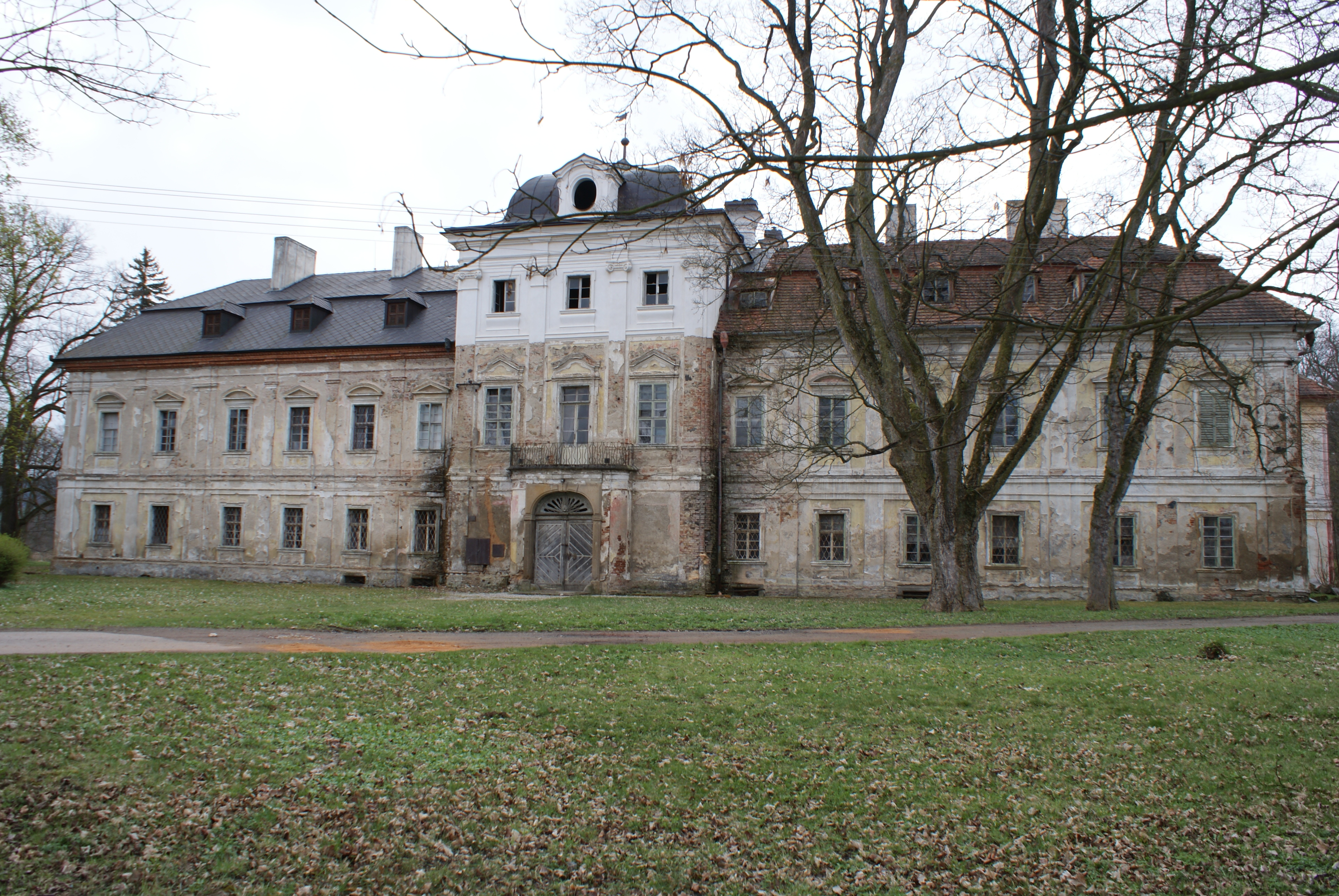
Morzin Palace in Dolní Lukavice

== History ==
It was the hereditary estate of Count Karl Joseph Morzin, an aristocrat of the Austrian Empire during the 18th century. Morzin is remembered today as the first person to employ the composer Joseph Haydn as his Kapellmeister, or music director. The location of the Count's estate has been specified by Robbins Landon as Unter-Lukawitz (Dolní Lukavice), sometimes referred to as Lukavec. The chateau was bought by Czechoslovak diplomat Ferdinand Veverka. In 1945 Veverka was accused of wartime collaboration with the Nazis and his estate was confiscated by the state. In the 1990s the roof was partially repaired. In 2000 the estate was returned to the Veverka family. Veverka's great grandson Zoltan Duphenieux later sought financing for more repairs.

== See also ==
- Morzin Palace in Prague
