= Joseph Haydn =

Austrian composer (1732–1809)

- Portrait, 1791
- Born: Rohrau
- Baptised: 1 April 1732
- Died: 31 May 1809 (aged 77); Vienna
- Works: List of compositions

Franz Joseph Haydn (Note: See Haydn's name. Haydn was baptized "Franciscus Josephus" (Franz Joseph), but "Franz" was not used during Haydn's lifetime and is avoided by scholars today ("Haydn, Joseph" Webster & Feder (2001)).) (/ˈhaɪdən/ HY-dən; German: [ˈfʁants ˈjoːzɛf ˈhaɪdn̩]; 31 March (Note: The date is uncertain. Haydn told others he was born on this day Geiringer (1982, p. 9), Jones (2009a, p. 8), but some of his family members reported 1 April instead (Geiringer). The difficulty arises from the fact that in Haydn's day, official records recorded not the birth date but the date of baptism, which, in Haydn's case, was 1 April Jones (2009a, pp. 2–3).) 1732 – 31 May 1809) was an Austrian composer of the Classical period. He was pivotal in the evolution of chamber music forms such as the string quartet and piano trio. His contributions to musical form have led him to be called "Father of the Symphony", "Father of the String quartet" and "Father of Sonata Form".

Haydn rose from humble origins as the child of working people in a rural village. He established his career firstly by serving as a chorister at St. Stephen's Cathedral, Vienna, then through an arduous period as a freelance musician. Eventually he found career success, spending much of his working life as music director for the wealthy Esterházy family at their palace of Eszterháza in rural Hungary. Though he had his own orchestra there, it isolated him from other composers and trends in music so that he was, as he put it, "forced to become original". (Note: Haydn made the remark to his friend and biographer Georg August Griesinger; cited from English version by Vernon Gotwals (Griesinger 1968, p. 17)) During this period his music circulated widely in publication, eventually making him the most celebrated composer in Europe. (Note: This characterization is made widely in scholarly writing about Haydn, though different scholars give different estimates for when he held this status. See, e.g. Nicholas Temperley (1991) Haydn: The Creation, Cambridge University Press, p. 5; H. C. Robbins Landon (1981) Haydn, a Documentary Study. Thames and Hudson, p. 12; Jones (2009a, p. vii); Lucktenberg, George (2005) Haydn: An Introduction to His Keyboard Works, Alfred Publishing, p. 2; Webster & Feder (2001, p. 1). For a similar contemporary assessment (from the Wiener Zeitung, 1797, see Jones (2009a, p. 183).) Notable works include the Paris and London symphonies. With the death of his patron Nikolaus Esterházy in 1790, Haydn became free to travel, and augmented his fame as a performer before the public in both London and Vienna. Late in life, he composed the oratorios The Creation (1798) and The Seasons (1801). The last years of his life (1803–1809) were spent in a state of debility, unable to compose due to poor health. He died in Vienna in 1809 at the age of 77.

Harold C. Schonberg writes that Haydn "was the Classic performer par excellence, and in his long life, from 1732 to 1809, he grew up with the new musical ideas and, more than any one man, shaped them." He was the elder brother of composer Michael Haydn, a friend and mentor of Mozart, and a teacher of Beethoven. Haydn, Mozart and Beethoven are sometimes referred to as the "First Viennese School".

== Life and career ==
=== Early life ===
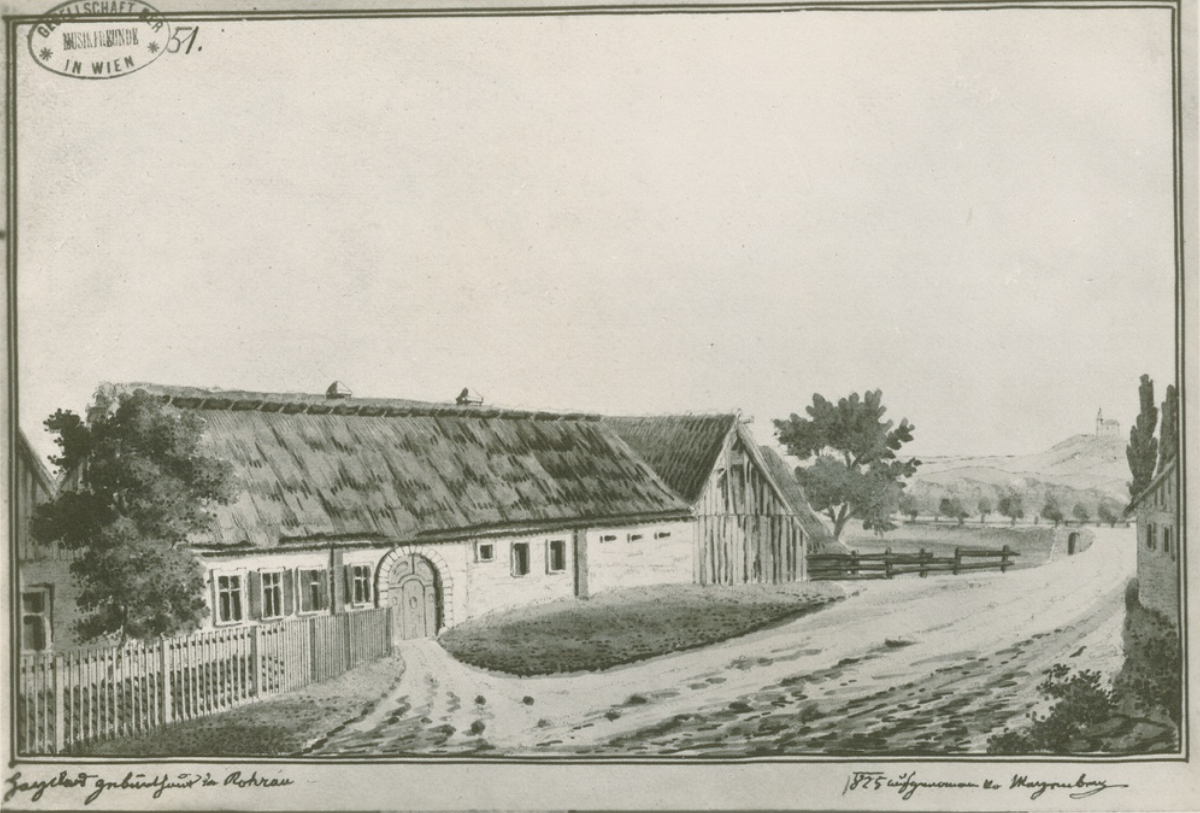
1825 depiction of the house in Rohrau, Austria, where Joseph Haydn was born and spent his early childhood. The house has been repeatedly restored and is now a Haydn museum.

Joseph Haydn was born in Rohrau, Austria, a village that at that time stood on the border with Hungary. His father was Mathias Haydn, a wheelwright who also served as "Marktrichter", or marketplace supervisor. Haydn's mother Maria, née Koller, had worked as a cook in the palace of Count Harrach, the presiding aristocrat of Rohrau. Neither parent could read music; (Note: Haydn reported this in his 1776 Autobiographical sketch.) however, Mathias was an enthusiastic folk musician, who during the journeyman period of his career had taught himself to play the harp. According to Haydn's later reminiscences, his family was extremely musical, and they frequently sang together and with their neighbours.

Haydn's parents had noticed that their son was musically gifted and knew that in Rohrau he would have no chance to obtain serious musical training. It was for this reason that, around the time Haydn turned six, they accepted a proposal from their relative Johann Matthias Frankh, the schoolmaster and choirmaster in nearby Hainburg, that Haydn be apprenticed to Frankh in his home to train as a musician. Haydn therefore went off with Frankh to Hainburg; he never again lived with his parents.

Life in the Frankh household was not easy for Haydn, who later remembered being frequently hungry and humiliated by the filthy state of his clothing. However, he quickly profited from his musical training, and could soon play both harpsichord and violin; he also sang treble parts in the church choir.

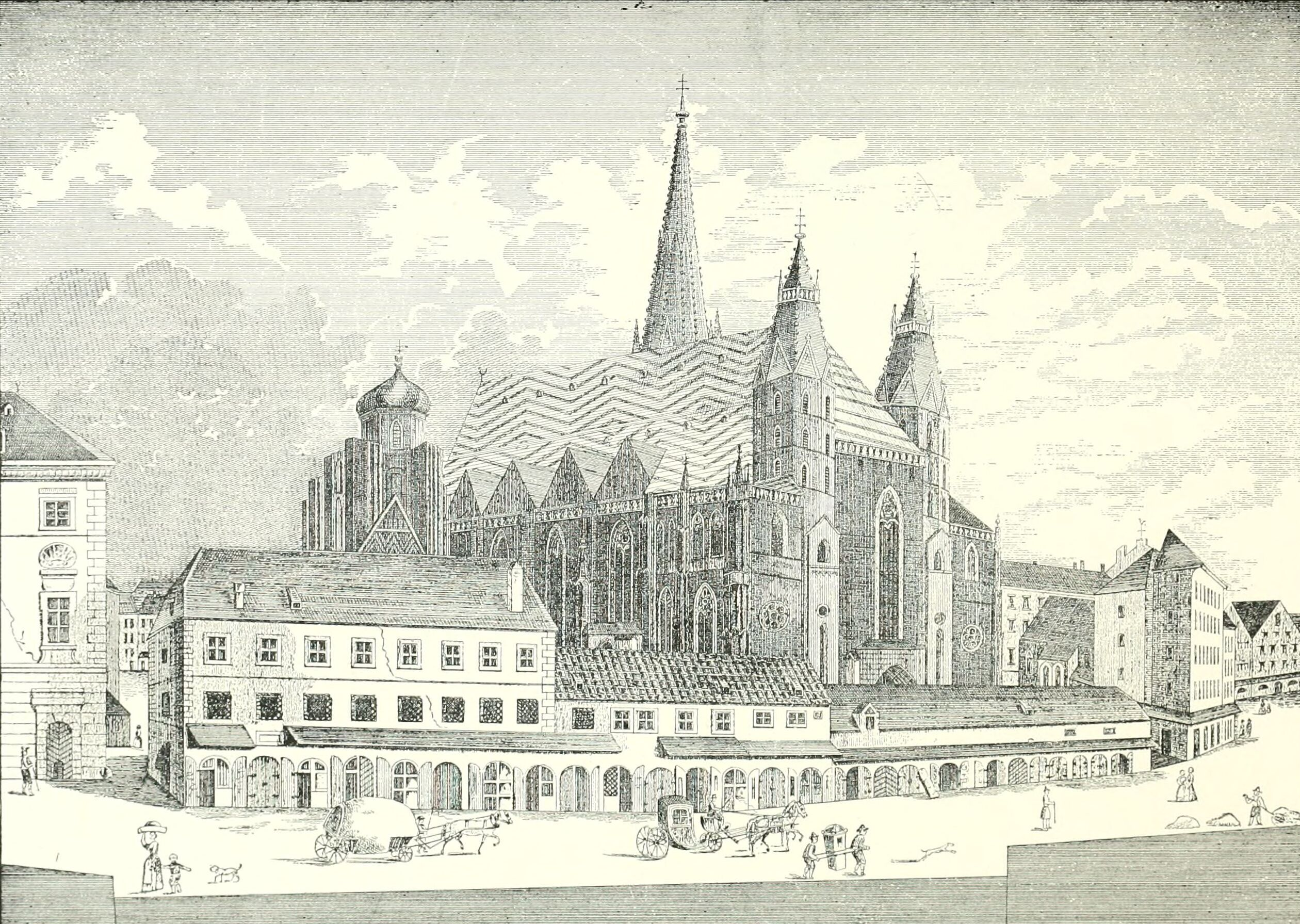
St. Stephen's Cathedral. In the foreground is the Kapellhaus (demolished 1804), where Haydn lived as a chorister.

There is reason to think that Haydn's singing impressed those who heard him, because in 1739 (Note: Finscher 2000, p. 12. Jones 2009a, p. 7 dates the visit to early summer, i.e. cherry season, since during the visit, Reutter plied the child with fresh cherries as a means of inducing him to learn to sing a trill.) he was brought to the attention of Georg Reutter the Younger, the director of music in St. Stephen's Cathedral in Vienna, who happened to be visiting Hainburg and was looking for new choirboys. Haydn passed his audition with Reutter, and after several months of further training moved to Vienna (1740), where he worked for the next nine years as a chorister.

Haydn lived in the Kapellhaus next to the cathedral, along with Reutter, Reutter's family, and the other four choirboys, which after 1745 included his younger brother Michael. The choirboys were instructed in Latin and other school subjects as well as voice, violin, and keyboard. Reutter was of little help to Haydn in the areas of music theory and composition, giving him only two lessons in his entire time as a chorister. However, since St. Stephen's was one of the leading musical centres in Europe, Haydn learned a great deal simply by serving as a professional musician there.

Like Frankh before him, Reutter did not always bother to make sure Haydn was properly fed. As he later told his biographer Albert Christoph Dies, Haydn was motivated to sing well, in hopes of gaining more invitations to perform before aristocratic audiences, where the singers were usually served refreshments. Anthony Tommasini writes that "Matthias Haydn must have felt guilty, if not horrified, when he received a letter from the choir director proposing that Joseph's soprano voice be surgically preserved."

=== Struggles as a freelancer ===
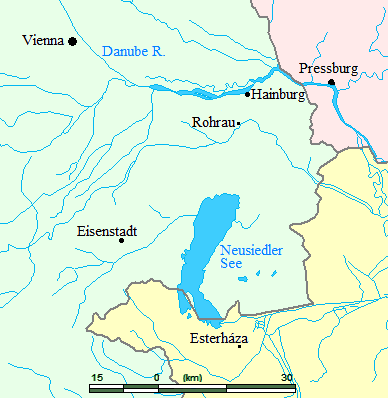
A map showing locations where Haydn lived or visited

By 1749, Haydn had matured physically to the point that he was no longer able to sing high choral parts. Empress Maria Theresa herself complained to Reutter about his singing, calling it "crowing". One day, Haydn carried out a prank, snipping off the pigtail of a fellow chorister. This was enough for Reutter: Haydn was first caned, then summarily dismissed and sent into the streets. He had the good fortune to be taken in by a friend, Johann Michael Spangler, who shared his family's crowded garret room with Haydn for a few months. Haydn immediately began his pursuit of a career as a freelance musician.

Haydn struggled at first, working at many different jobs: as a music teacher, as a street serenader, and eventually, in 1752, as valet-accompanist for the Italian composer Nicola Porpora, from whom he later said he learned "the true fundamentals of composition". He was also briefly in Count Friedrich Wilhelm von Haugwitz's employ, playing the organ in the Bohemian Chancellery chapel at the Judenplatz.

While a chorister, Haydn had not received any systematic training in music theory and composition. As a remedy, he worked his way through the counterpoint exercises in the text Gradus ad Parnassum by Johann Joseph Fux and carefully studied the work of Carl Philipp Emanuel Bach, whom he later acknowledged as an important influence. He said of C. P. E. Bach's first six keyboard sonatas, "I did not leave my clavier till I played them through, and whoever knows me thoroughly must discover that I owe a great deal to Emanuel Bach, that I understood him and have studied him with diligence." According to Griesinger and Dies, in the 1750s Haydn studied an encyclopedic treatise by Johann Mattheson, a German composer.

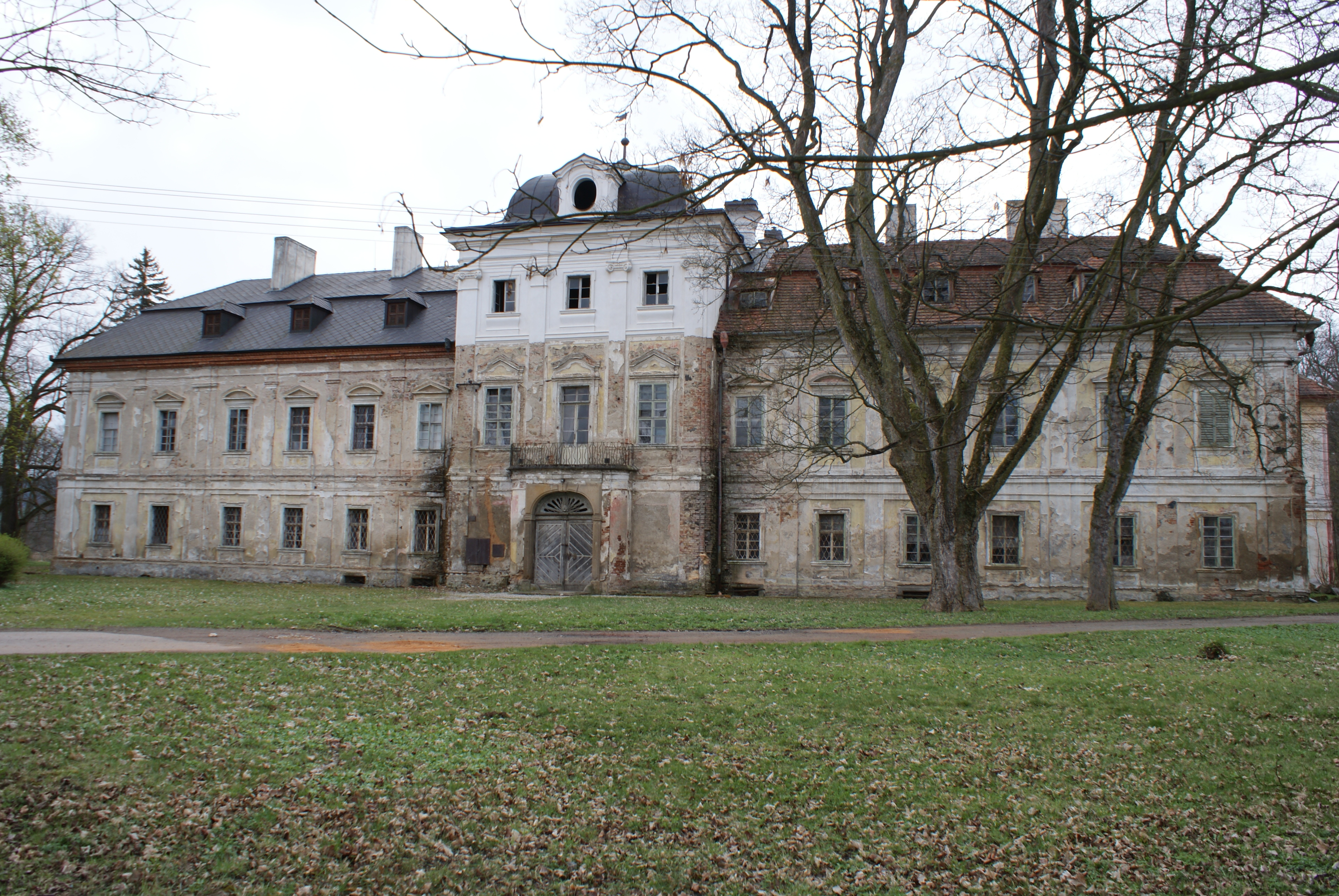
Morzin Palace, Dolní Lukavice, Czech Republic

As his skills increased, Haydn began to acquire a public reputation, first as the composer of an opera, Der krumme Teufel (The Limping Devil), written for the comic actor Joseph Felix von Kurz, whose stage name was "Bernardon". The work was premiered successfully in 1753, but was soon closed down by the censors due to "offensive remarks". Haydn also noticed, apparently without annoyance, that works he had simply given away were being published and sold in local music shops. Between 1754 and 1756 Haydn also worked freelance for the court in Vienna. He was among several musicians who were paid for services as supplementary musicians at balls given for the imperial children during carnival season, and as supplementary singers in the imperial chapel (the Hofkapelle) in Lent and Holy Week.

With the increase in his reputation, Haydn eventually obtained aristocratic patronage, crucial for the career of a composer in his day. Countess Thun, (Note: Various individuals bore the title "Countess Thun" over time. Candidates for the countess who engaged Haydn are (a) "the elder Countess Maria Christine Thun", (Webster 2002); (b) Maria Wilhelmine Thun (later a famous salon hostess and patroness of Mozart), (Volkmar Braunbehrens, 1990, Mozart in Vienna).) having seen one of Haydn's compositions, summoned him and engaged him as her singing and keyboard teacher. (Note: Webster 2002, p. 8. Webster expresses doubts since the source is the early biography of Nicolas-Étienne Framery, judged (Webster 2002, p. 1) the least reliable of Haydn's early biographers.) In 1756, Baron Carl Josef Fürnberg employed Haydn at his country estate, Weinzierl, where the composer wrote his first string quartets. Their enthusiastic reception encouraged Haydn to write more. Fürnberg later recommended Haydn to Count Morzin, who, in 1757, (Note: This date is uncertain, since the early biography of Griesinger (1968) gives 1759. For the evidence supporting the earlier date see Landon & Jones (1988, p. 34) and Webster (2002, p. 10).) became his first full-time employer.

=== Years as Kapellmeister ===
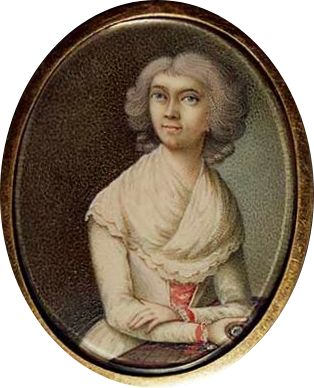
Haydn's wife. Unauthenticated miniature attributed to Ludwig Guttenbrunn

Haydn's job title under Count Morzin was Kapellmeister, that is, music director. Like many aristocrats of the Austrian Empire at the time, the Count kept his own small orchestra, which Haydn led and composed for. His salary was a respectable 200 florins a year, plus free board and lodging. The Count lived the typical aristocratic lifestyle: winters in fashionable Vienna, but in summer escaping the heat and dust of the city for the ancestral estate in the country; this was at Unterlukawitz, now in the Czech Republic. Haydn and his musicians served their employer wherever he happened to be living. For Count Morzin Haydn wrote his first symphonies (perhaps about 10–20; the number is unknown). Philip Downs comments on these first symphonies: "the seeds of the future are there, his works already exhibit a richness and profusion of material, and a disciplined yet varied expression."

In 1760, with the security of a Kapellmeister position, Haydn married. His wife was the former Maria Anna Theresia Keller (1729–1800), the sister of Therese (b. 1733), with whom Haydn had previously been in love. Haydn and his wife had an unhappy marriage, from which the laws of the time permitted no escape. They produced no children, and both took lovers. (Note: Mrs. Haydn's paramour (1770) was Ludwig Guttenbrunn, an artist who produced the portrait of Haydn seen above (Landon & Jones 1988, p. 109). Joseph Haydn had a long relationship, starting in 1779, with the singer Luigia Polzelli, and was probably the father of her son Antonio (Landon & Jones 1988, p. 116).)

Count Morzin soon suffered financial reverses that forced him to dismiss his musical establishment, but Haydn was quickly offered a similar job (1761) by Prince Paul Anton, head of the immensely wealthy Esterházy family. Haydn's job title was only Vice-Kapellmeister, but he was immediately placed in charge of most of the Esterházy musical establishment, with the old Kapellmeister Gregor Werner retaining authority only for church music. When Werner died in 1766, Haydn was elevated to full Kapellmeister.

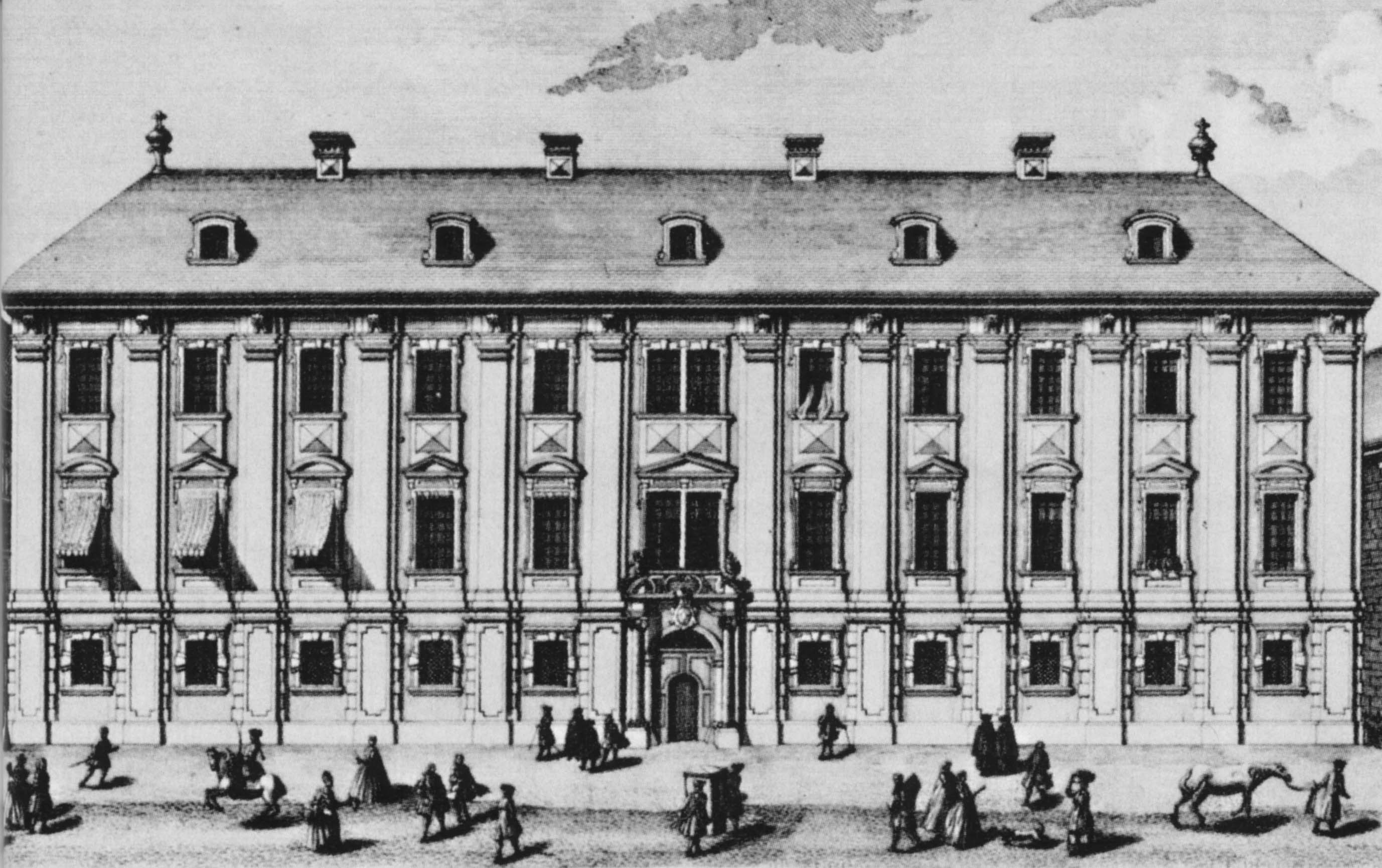
Haydn's in-town work venue: the city palace of the Esterházys on the Wallnerstrasse in Vienna

As a "house officer" in the Esterházy establishment, Haydn wore livery and followed the family as they moved among their various palaces, most importantly the family's ancestral seat Schloss Esterházy in Eisenstadt and later on Esterháza, a grand new palace built in rural Hungary in the 1760s. Haydn had a huge range of responsibilities, including composition, running the orchestra, playing chamber music for and with his patrons, and eventually the mounting of operatic productions. Despite this backbreaking workload, (Note: (Landon & Jones 1988, p. 100) write: "Haydn's duties were crushing. We can notice the effect in his handwriting, which becomes hastier as the 1770s turn to the 1780s: the notation starts to become ever more careless in the scores and the abbreviations multiply.") the job was in artistic terms a superb opportunity for Haydn. The Esterházy princes (Paul Anton, then from 1762 to 1790 Nikolaus I) were musical connoisseurs who appreciated his work and gave him daily access to his own small orchestra. During the nearly thirty years that Haydn worked at the Esterházy court, he produced a flood of compositions, and his musical style continued to develop. He reflected: "My prince was content with all my works, I received approval, I could, as head of an orchestra, make experiments, observe what enhanced an effect, and what weakened it, thus improving, adding to, cutting away, and running risks. I was set apart from the world, there was nobody in my vicinity to confuse and annoy me in my course, and so I had to be original."

Much of Haydn's activity at the time followed the musical taste of his patron Prince Nikolaus. In about 1765, the prince obtained and began to learn to play the baryton, an uncommon musical instrument similar to the bass viol, but with a set of plucked sympathetic strings. Haydn was commanded to provide music for the prince to play, and over the next ten years produced about 200 works for this instrument in various ensembles, the most notable of which are the 126 baryton trios. Around 1775, the prince abandoned the baryton and took up a new hobby: opera productions, previously a sporadic event for special occasions, became the focus of musical life at court, and the opera theatre the prince had built at Esterháza came to host a major season, with (per Jones) "a schedule that soon rivalled any private or public opera house in Europe." Haydn served as de facto company director, recruiting and training the singers and preparing and leading the performances. He wrote several of the operas performed and wrote substitution arias to insert into the operas of other composers.

1779 was a watershed year for Haydn, as his contract was renegotiated: whereas previously all his compositions were the property of the Esterházy family, he now was permitted to write for others and sell his work to publishers. Haydn soon shifted his emphasis in composition to reflect this (fewer operas, and more quartets and symphonies) and he negotiated with multiple publishers, both Austrian and foreign. His new employment contract "acted as a catalyst in the next stage in Haydn's career, the achievement of international popularity. As Jones notes, by 1790, Haydn was in the paradoxical position ... of being Europe's leading composer, but someone who spent his time as a duty-bound Kapellmeister in a remote palace in the Hungarian countryside." The new publication campaign resulted in the composition of a great number of new string quartets (the six-quartet sets of Op. 33, 50, 54/55, and 64). Haydn also composed in response to commissions from abroad: the Paris symphonies (1785–1786) and the original orchestral version of The Seven Last Words of Christ (1786), a commission from Cádiz, Spain.

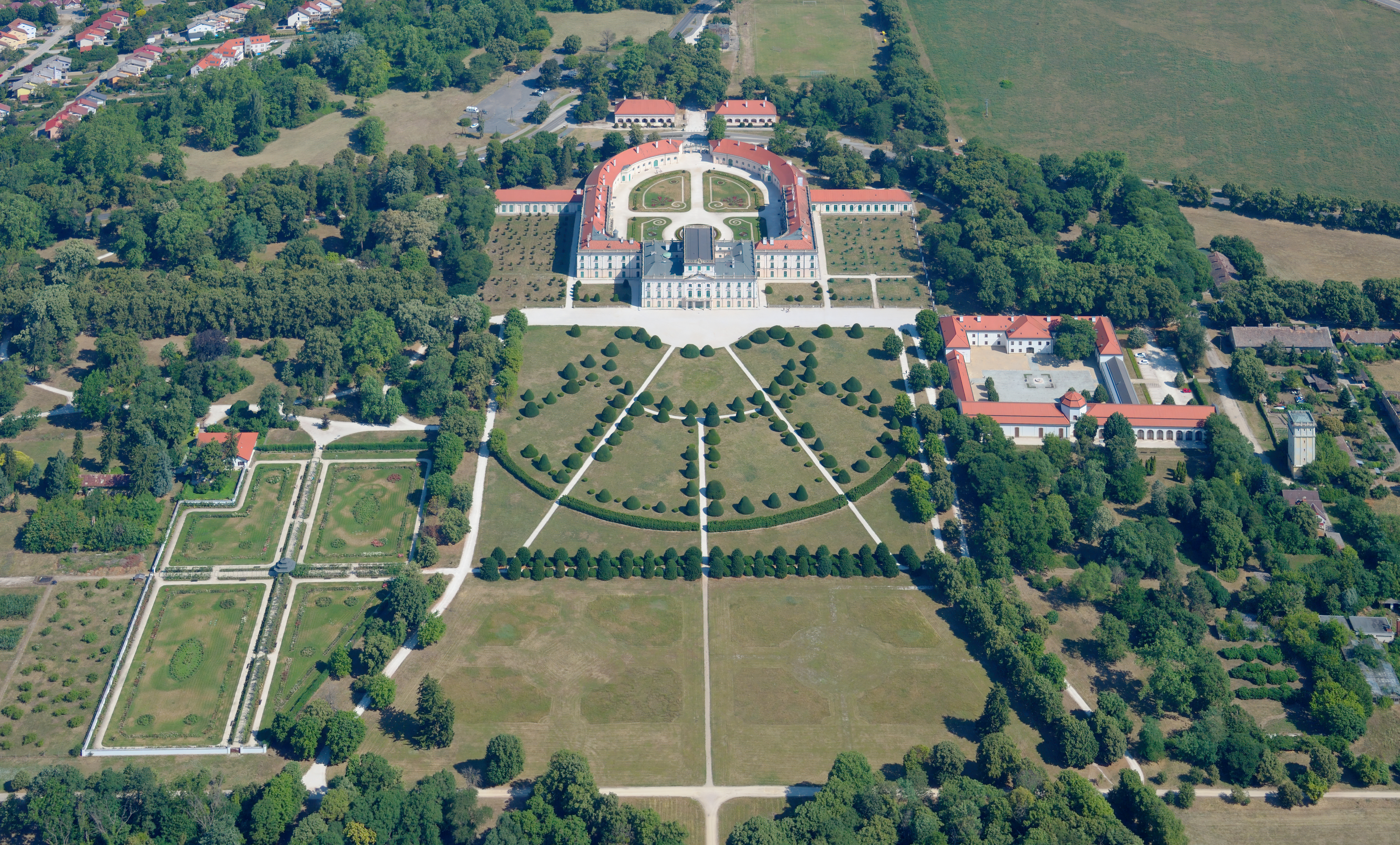
Eszterháza, the palace built by Prince Nikolaus in rural Hungary, where Haydn spent much of his career

The remoteness of Esterháza, which was farther from Vienna than Eisenstadt, led Haydn gradually to feel more isolated and lonely. He longed to visit Vienna because of his friendships there. Of these, a particularly important one was with Maria Anna von Genzinger (1754–1793), the wife of Prince Nikolaus's personal physician in Vienna, who began a close, platonic relationship with the composer in 1789. Haydn wrote to Mrs. Genzinger often, expressing his loneliness at Esterháza and his happiness for the few occasions on which he was able to visit her in Vienna. Later on, Haydn wrote to her frequently from London. Her premature death in 1793 was a blow to Haydn, and his F minor variations for piano, Hob. XVII:6, may have been written in response to her death.

Another friend in Vienna was Wolfgang Amadeus Mozart, whom Haydn had met sometime around 1784. According to later testimony by Michael Kelly and others, the two composers occasionally played in string quartets with Carl Ditters von Dittersdorf (second violin) and Johann Baptist Wanhal (cello) for small gatherings attended by Giovanni Paisiello and Giovanni Battista Casti. Impressed by Mozart's work, Haydn praised it unstintingly to others. Mozart returned the esteem in his "Haydn" quartets. In 1785 Haydn was admitted to the same Masonic lodge as Mozart, the "Zur wahren Eintracht" in Vienna. (Note: There is no evidence that Haydn ever attended a meeting after his admittance ceremony, and he was dropped from the lodge's rolls in 1787.)

=== London journeys ===
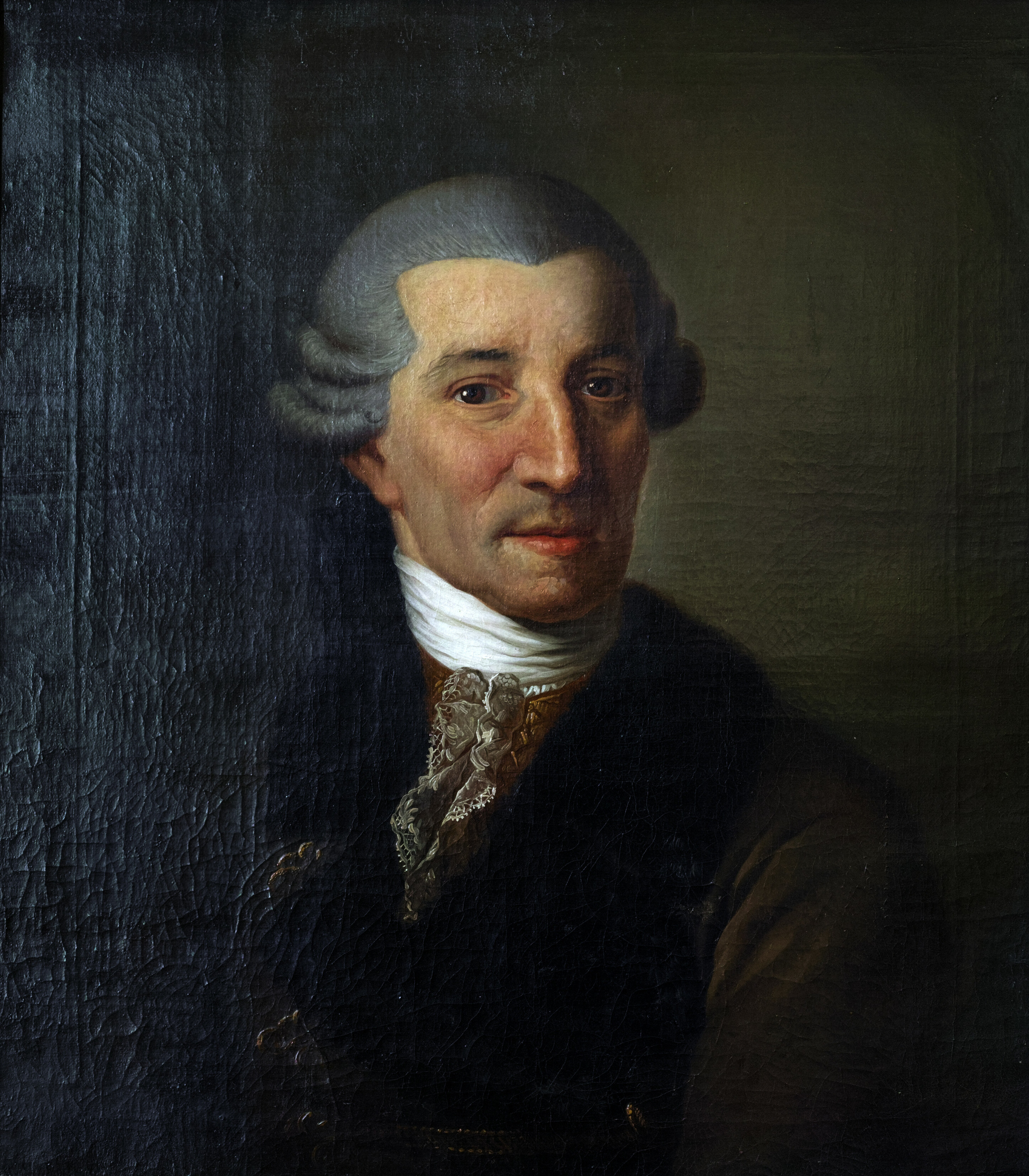
Portrait of Joseph Haydn by Christian Ludwig Seehas, 1785

In 1790, Prince Nikolaus died and was succeeded as prince by his son Anton. Following a trend of the time, Anton sought to economize by dismissing most of the court musicians. Haydn retained a nominal appointment with Anton, at a reduced salary of 400 florins, as well as a 1000-florin pension from Nikolaus. Since Anton had little need of Haydn's services, he was willing to let him travel, and the composer accepted a lucrative offer from Johann Peter Salomon, a German violinist and impresario, to visit England and conduct new symphonies with a large orchestra.

The choice was a sensible one because Haydn was already a very popular composer there. Since the death of Johann Christian Bach in 1782, Haydn's music had dominated the concert scene in London; per Jones, "hardly a concert did not feature a work by him". Haydn's work was widely distributed by publishers in London, including Forster (who had their own contract with Haydn) and Longman & Broderip (who served as an agent in England for Haydn's Vienna publisher Artaria). Efforts to bring Haydn to London had been made since 1782, though Haydn's loyalty to Prince Nikolaus had prevented him from accepting.

After fond farewells from Mozart and other friends, Haydn departed from Vienna with Salomon on 15 December 1790, arriving in Calais in time to cross the English Channel on New Year's Day of 1791. It was the first time that the 58-year-old composer had seen the sea. Arriving in London, Haydn stayed with Salomon in Great Pulteney Street (near Piccadilly Circus) working in a borrowed studio at the Broadwood piano firm nearby.

It was the start of a very auspicious period for Haydn: both the 1791–1792 journey, along with a repeat visit in 1794–1795, were greatly successful. Audiences flocked to Haydn's concerts; he augmented his fame and made large profits, thus becoming financially secure. (Note: According to Jones 2009b, pp. 144–146, the London visits yielded a net profit of 15,000 florins. Haydn continued to prosper after the visits and at his death left an estate valued at 55,713 florins. These were substantial sums; for comparison, the house he bought in Gumpendorf in 1793 (and then remodelled) cost only 1370 florins.) Charles Burney reviewed the first concert thus: "Haydn himself presided at the piano-forte; and the sight of that renowned composer so electrified the audience, as to excite an attention and a pleasure superior to any that had ever been caused by instrumental music in England." (Note: From Burney's memoirs; quoted from Landon & Jones (1988, p. 234)) Haydn made many new friends and, for a time, was involved in a romantic relationship with Rebecca Schroeter.

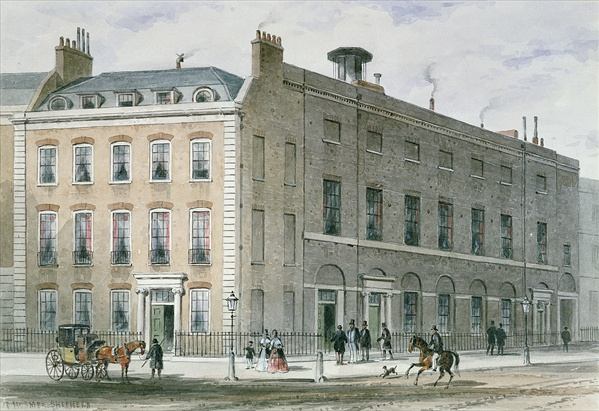
Hanover Square Rooms, principal venue of Haydn's performances in London

Musically, Haydn's visits to England generated some of his best-known work, including the Surprise, Military, Drumroll and London symphonies; the Rider quartet; and the "Gypsy Rondo" piano trio. The great success of the overall enterprise does not mean that the journeys were free of trouble. Notably, his first project, the commissioned opera L'anima del filosofo (The Soul of the Philosopher) was duly written during the early stages of the trip, but the opera's impresario John Gallini was unable to obtain a licence to permit opera performances in the theatre he directed, the King's Theatre. Haydn was well paid for the opera (£300) but much time was wasted. (Note: The premier performance did not take place until 1951, during the Florence May Festival. Maria Callas sang the role of Euridice. The opera and its history are discussed in Geiringer 1982, pp. 342–343.) Thus only two new symphonies, No. 95 and No. 96 Miracle, could be premiered in the 12 concerts of Salomon's spring concert series in 1791. Another problem arose from the jealously competitive efforts of a senior, rival orchestra, the Professional Concerts, who recruited Haydn's old pupil Ignaz Pleyel as a rival visiting composer; the two composers, refusing to play along with the concocted rivalry, dined together and put each other's symphonies on their concert programs.

The end of Salomon's series in June 1791 gave Haydn a rare period of relative leisure. He spent some of the time in the country (Hertingfordbury), but also had time to travel, notably to Oxford, where he was awarded an honorary doctorate by the university. The symphony performed for the occasion, No. 92 has since come to be known as the Oxford Symphony, although it had been written two years before, in 1789. Four further new symphonies (Nos. 93, 94, 97 and 98) were performed in early 1792. Rosen writes of the Oxford Symphony, "With this work and with Mozart's Prague, the classical symphony finally attained the grandeur of the great public genres of the Baroque, oratorio and opera."

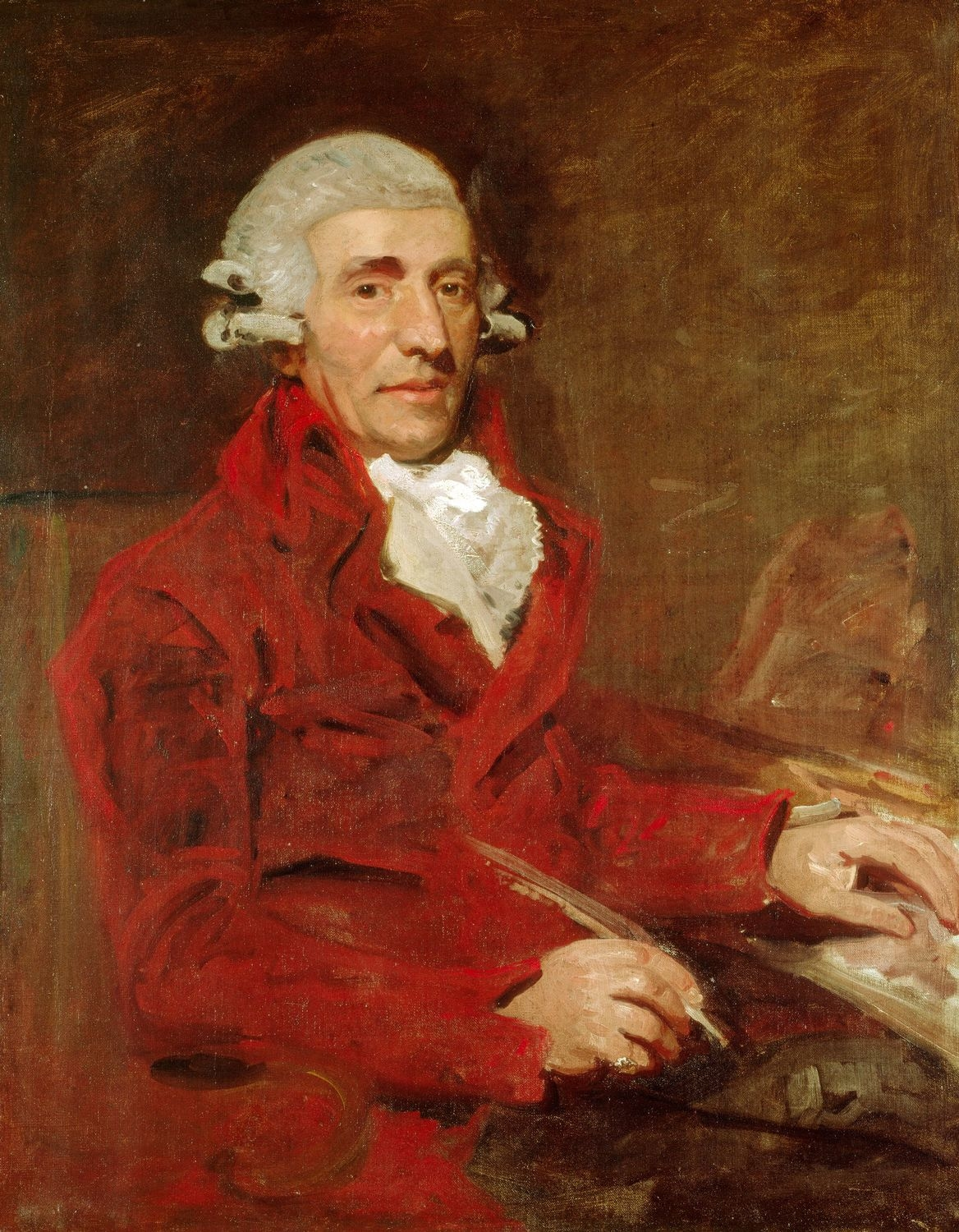
Haydn as portrayed by John Hoppner in England in 1791

While travelling to London in 1790, Haydn met the young Ludwig van Beethoven in his native city of Bonn. On Haydn's return, Beethoven came to Vienna and was Haydn's pupil up until the second London journey. Haydn took Beethoven with him to Eisenstadt for the summer, where Haydn had little to do, and taught Beethoven some counterpoint. While in Vienna, Haydn purchased a house for himself and his wife in the suburbs and started remodelling it. He also arranged for the performance of some of his London symphonies in local concerts. In 1792, he visited the astronomer and composer William Herschel in Slough, which influenced his oratorio The Creation.

By the time he arrived on his second journey to England (1794–1795), Haydn had become a familiar figure on the London concert scene. The 1794 season was dominated by Salomon's ensemble, as the Professional Concerts had abandoned their efforts. The concerts included the premieres of the 99th, 100th, and 101st symphonies. In 1795, Salomon had abandoned his own series, citing difficulty in obtaining "vocal performers of the first rank from abroad", and Haydn joined forces with the Opera Concerts, headed by the violinist Giovanni Battista Viotti. The location of the concerts was shifted from the Hanover Square Rooms, seating an audience of 500, to a new hall in the King's Theatre, seating 800. At these concerts were premiered Haydn's final three symphonies, 102, 103 ("Drumroll"), and 104 ("London"). The final benefit concert for Haydn ("Dr. Haydn's night"), at the end of the 1795 season, was a great success and was perhaps the peak of his English career. Haydn's biographer Griesinger wrote that Haydn "considered the days spent in England the happiest of his life. He was everywhere appreciated there; it opened a new world to him".

=== Years of celebrity in Vienna ===
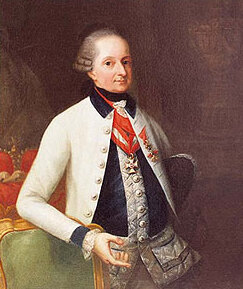
Prince Nikolaus Esterházy, Haydn's most important patron

Haydn returned to Vienna in 1795. Prince Anton had died, and his successor Nikolaus II proposed that the Esterházy musical establishment be revived with Haydn serving again as Kapellmeister. Haydn took up the position on a part-time basis. He spent his summers with the Esterházys in Eisenstadt, and over the course of several years wrote six masses for them including the Lord Nelson mass in 1798.

By this time Haydn had become a public figure in Vienna. He spent most of his time in his home, a large house in the suburb of Windmühle, (Note: The house, at Haydngasse 19, has since 1899 been a Haydn museum Haydnhaus, Vienna Museum).) and wrote works for public performance. In collaboration with his librettist and mentor Gottfried van Swieten, and with funding from van Swieten's Gesellschaft der Associierten, he composed his two great oratorios, The Creation (1798) and The Seasons (1801). The former has a libretto based on the Book of Genesis, the Psalms and John Milton's Paradise Lost. Haydn frequently appeared before the public, often leading performances of The Creation and The Seasons for charity benefits, including Tonkünstler-Societät programs with massed musical forces. He also composed instrumental music: the popular Trumpet Concerto, and the last nine in his long series of string quartets, including the Fifths, Emperor, and Sunrise. Directly inspired by hearing audiences sing God Save the King in London, in 1797 Haydn wrote a patriotic "Emperor's Hymn" "Gott erhalte Franz den Kaiser", ("God Save Emperor Francis"). This achieved great success and became "the enduring emblem of Austrian identity right up to the First World War". The melody was used for von Fallersleben's Deutschlandlied (1841), whose third stanza is today the national anthem of Germany.

During the later years of this successful period, Haydn faced incipient old age and fluctuating health, and he had to struggle to complete his final works. His last major work, from 1802, was the sixth mass for the Esterházys, the Harmoniemesse.

=== Retirement, illness, and death ===
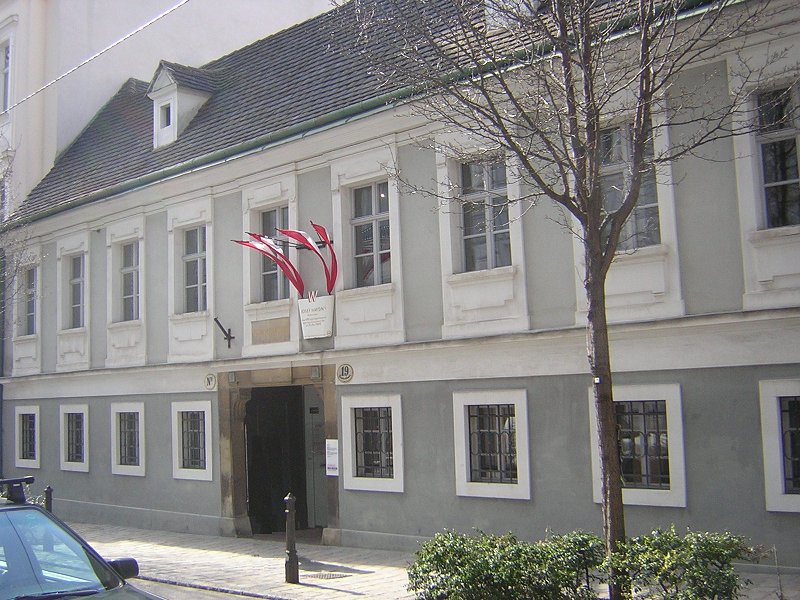
The house in Vienna (now a museum) where Haydn spent the last years of his life

By the end of 1803, Haydn's condition had declined to the point that he became physically unable to compose. He suffered from weakness, dizziness, inability to concentrate and painfully swollen legs. Since diagnosis was uncertain in Haydn's time, it is unlikely that the precise illness can ever be identified, though Jones suggests arteriosclerosis. The illness was especially hard for Haydn because the flow of fresh musical ideas continued unabated, although he could no longer work them out as compositions. (Note: Of Haydn's plight, Rosen (1997) wrote, "The last years of Haydn's life, with all his success, comfort, and celebrity, are among the saddest in music. More moving than the false pathos of a pauper's grave for Mozart ... is the figure of Haydn filled with musical ideas which were struggling to escape, as he himself said; he was too old and weak to go to the piano and submit to the discipline of working them out.") His biographer Dies reported Haydn saying in 1806:

I must have something to do—usually musical ideas are pursuing me, to the point of torture, I cannot escape them, they stand like walls before me. If it's an allegro that pursues me, my pulse keeps beating faster, I can get no sleep. If it's an adagio, then I notice my pulse beating slowly. My imagination plays on me as if I were a clavier." (Note: "Clavier" in the original German is ambiguous; literally "keyboard", it is used by extension to denote a keyboard instrument such as the piano or harpsichord. Dies 1810, p. 141.) Haydn smiled, the blood rushed to his face, and he said "I am really just a living clavier."

The winding down of Haydn's career was gradual. The Esterházy family kept him on as Kapellmeister to the very end (much as they had with his predecessor Werner long before), but they appointed new staff to lead their musical establishment: Johann Michael Fuchs in 1802 as Vice-Kapellmeister and Johann Nepomuk Hummel as Konzertmeister in 1804. Haydn's last summer in Eisenstadt was in 1803, and his last appearance before the public as a conductor was a charity performance of The Seven Last Words on 26 December 1803. As debility set in, he made largely futile efforts at composition, attempting to revise a rediscovered Missa brevis from his teenage years and complete his final string quartet. The former project was abandoned for good in 1805, and the quartet was published with just two movements.

Haydn was well cared for by his servants, and he received many visitors and public honours during his last years, but they could not have been very happy years for him. During his illness, Haydn often found solace by sitting at the piano and playing his "Emperor's Hymn". A final triumph occurred on 27 March 1808 when a performance of The Creation was organized in his honour. The very frail composer was brought into the hall on an armchair to the sound of trumpets and drums and was greeted by Beethoven, Salieri (who led the performance) and by other musicians and members of the aristocracy. Haydn was both moved and exhausted by the experience and had to depart at intermission.

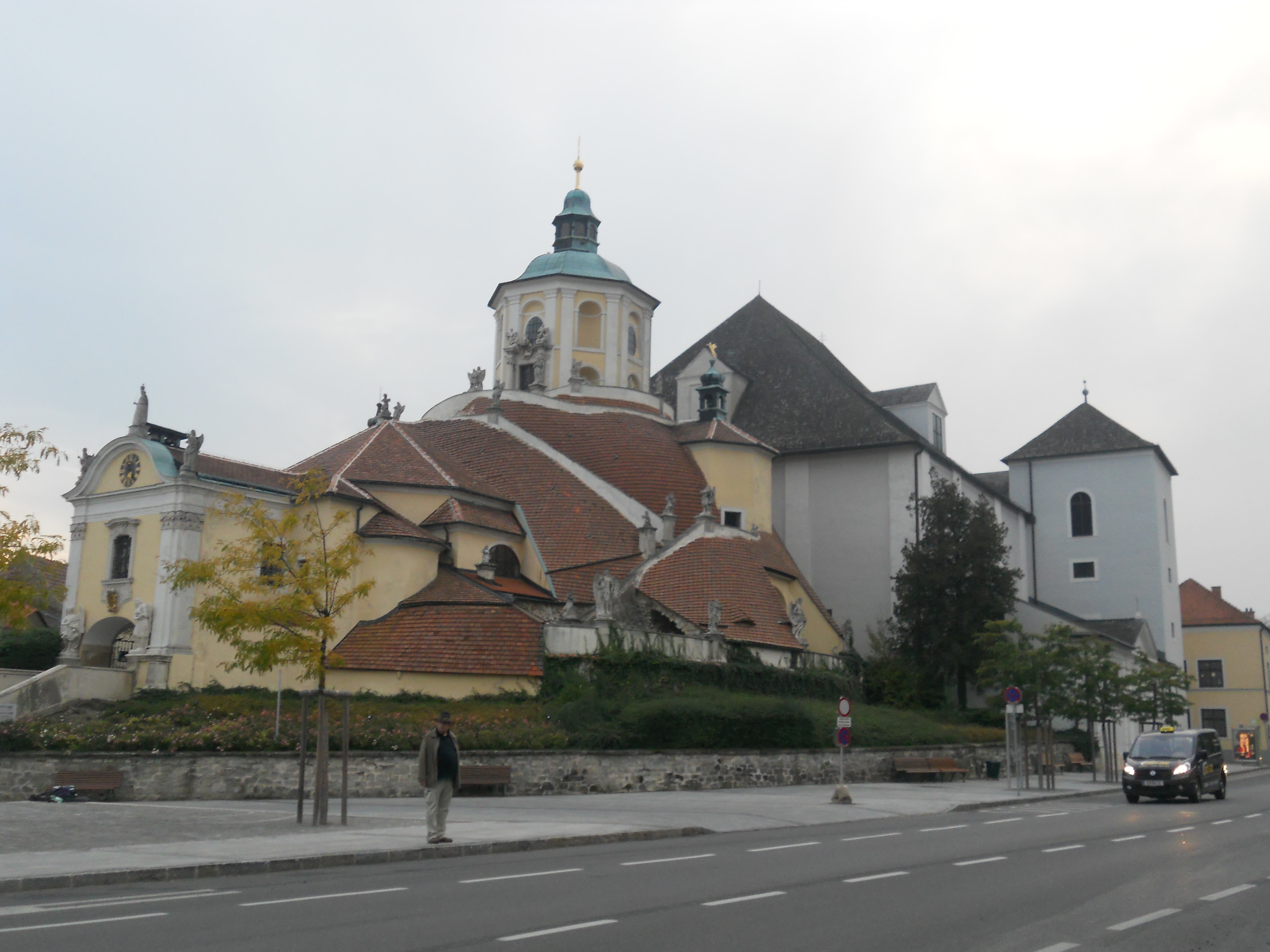
The Bergkirche in Eisenstadt, site of Haydn's tomb

Haydn lived on for 14 more months. His final days were hardly serene, as in May 1809 the French army under Napoleon launched an attack on Vienna and on 10 May bombarded his neighbourhood. According to Griesinger, "Four case shots fell, rattling the windows and doors of his house. He called out in a loud voice to his alarmed and frightened people, 'Don't be afraid, children, where Haydn is, no harm can reach you!'. But the spirit was stronger than the flesh, for he had hardly uttered the brave words when his whole body began to tremble." More bombardments followed until the city fell to the French on 13 May. Haydn, was, however, deeply moved and appreciative when on 17 May a French cavalry officer named Sulémy came to pay his respects and sang, skillfully, an aria from The Creation. (Note: "Mit Würd' und Hoheit angetan", the aria narrating the creation of humankind; Griesinger (1810, p. 51). According to the less-reliable Dies, the date was 25 May, the officer's name was Sulimi, and he sang an aria from The Seasons (Dies 1810, in the English translation from Gotwals 1968, p. 193).)

On 26 May Haydn played his "Emperor's Hymn" with unusual gusto three times; the same evening he collapsed and was taken to what proved to be his deathbed. He died peacefully in his own home at 12:40 a.m. on 31 May 1809, aged 77. On 15 June, a memorial service was held in the Schottenkirche at which Mozart's Requiem was performed. Haydn's remains were interred in the local Hundsturm cemetery until 1820 when they were moved to Eisenstadt by Prince Nikolaus. His head took a different journey; it was stolen by phrenologists shortly after burial, and the skull was reunited with the other remains only in 1954, now interred in a tomb in the north tower of the Bergkirche.

== Character and appearance ==
Haydn's signature on a work of music: di me giuseppe Haydn ("by me Joseph Haydn"). He writes in Italian, a language he often used professionally.

James Webster writes of Haydn's public character thus: "Haydn's public life exemplified the Enlightenment ideal of the honnête homme (honest man): the man whose good character and worldly success enable and justify each other. His modesty and probity were everywhere acknowledged. These traits were not only prerequisites to his success as Kapellmeister, entrepreneur and public figure, but also aided the favourable reception of his music." Haydn was especially respected by the Esterházy court musicians whom he supervised, as he maintained a cordial working atmosphere and effectively represented the musicians' interests with their employer; see Papa Haydn and the tale of the "Farewell" Symphony. Haydn had a robust sense of humour, evident in his love of practical jokes and often apparent in his music, and he had many friends. For much of his life he benefited from a "happy and naturally cheerful temperament", but in his later life, there is evidence for periods of depression, notably in the correspondence with Mrs. Genzinger and in Dies's biography, based on visits made in Haydn's old age.

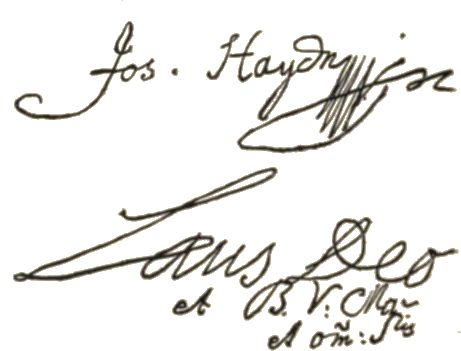
Laus Deo ("praise be to God") at the conclusion of a Haydn manuscript (Note: The inscription continues (in abbreviations) "et Beatae Virginis Mariae et omnibus sanctis" ("and to the Blessed Virgin Mary and all the saints"). The image is taken from the 1900 edition of Grove's Dictionary of Music and Musicians; it does not identify the work in question.)

Haydn was a devout Catholic who often turned to his rosary when he had trouble composing, a practice that he usually found to be effective. He normally began the manuscript of each composition with In nomine Domini [in the name of the Lord] and ended with Laus Deo [praise be to God]. He retained this practice even in his secular works; he frequently only uses the initials "L. D.", "S. D. G." [soli Deo gloria], or Laus Deo et B. V. M. [... and to Beatae Virgini Mariae] and sometimes adds, "et om^{s} si^{s}" (et omnibus sanctis – and all saints)

Webster observes that Haydn could be sharp in his business dealings, and that some contemporaries were surprised and even shocked at this. Webster writes: "As regards money, Haydn…always attempted to maximize his income, whether by negotiating the right to sell his music outside the Esterházy court, driving hard bargains with publishers or selling his works three and four times over [to publishers in different countries]; he regularly engaged in 'sharp practice'" which nowadays might be regarded as plain fraud. But those were days when copyright was in its infancy, and the pirating of musical works was common. Publishers had few qualms about attaching Haydn's name to popular works by lesser composers, an arrangement that effectively robbed the lesser musician of livelihood. Webster notes that Haydn's ruthlessness in business might be viewed more sympathetically in light of his struggles with poverty during his years as a freelancer—and that outside the world of business, in his dealings, for example, with relatives, musicians and servants, and in volunteering his services for charitable concerts, Haydn was a generous man – e.g., offering to teach the two infant sons of Mozart for free after their father's death. When Haydn died he was certainly comfortably off, but by middle class rather than aristocratic standards.

Haydn was short in stature, perhaps as a result of having been underfed throughout most of his youth. Carpani, who knew him personally, wrote that Haydn had an oblong face with a prominent nose, a dark complexion, and large, blackish eyes under bushy eyebrows.

Like many in his day he was a survivor of smallpox; his face was pitted with the scars of this disease. (Note: The date of Haydn's bout with smallpox is not preserved. It was prior to the time he was hired by Countess Thun (i.e. as a young adult; see above), since it is recorded that when she first encountered Haydn she observed his scars as part of the generally poor impression his appearance made on her. See Geiringer 1982, p. 34.) His biographer Dies wrote: "he couldn't understand how it happened that in his life he had been loved by many a pretty woman. 'They couldn't have been led to it by my beauty.'" Although Haydn generally enjoyed good health, he suffered from nasal polyps during much of his adult life, an agonizing and debilitating condition that at times prevented him from writing music.

== Music ==
James Webster summarizes Haydn's role in the history of classical music as follows:

He excelled in every musical genre. [...] He is familiarly known as the "father of the symphony" because he composed 106 symphonies, and could with greater justice be thus regarded for the string quartet; no other composer approaches his combination of productivity, quality and historical importance in these genres.

=== Structure ===
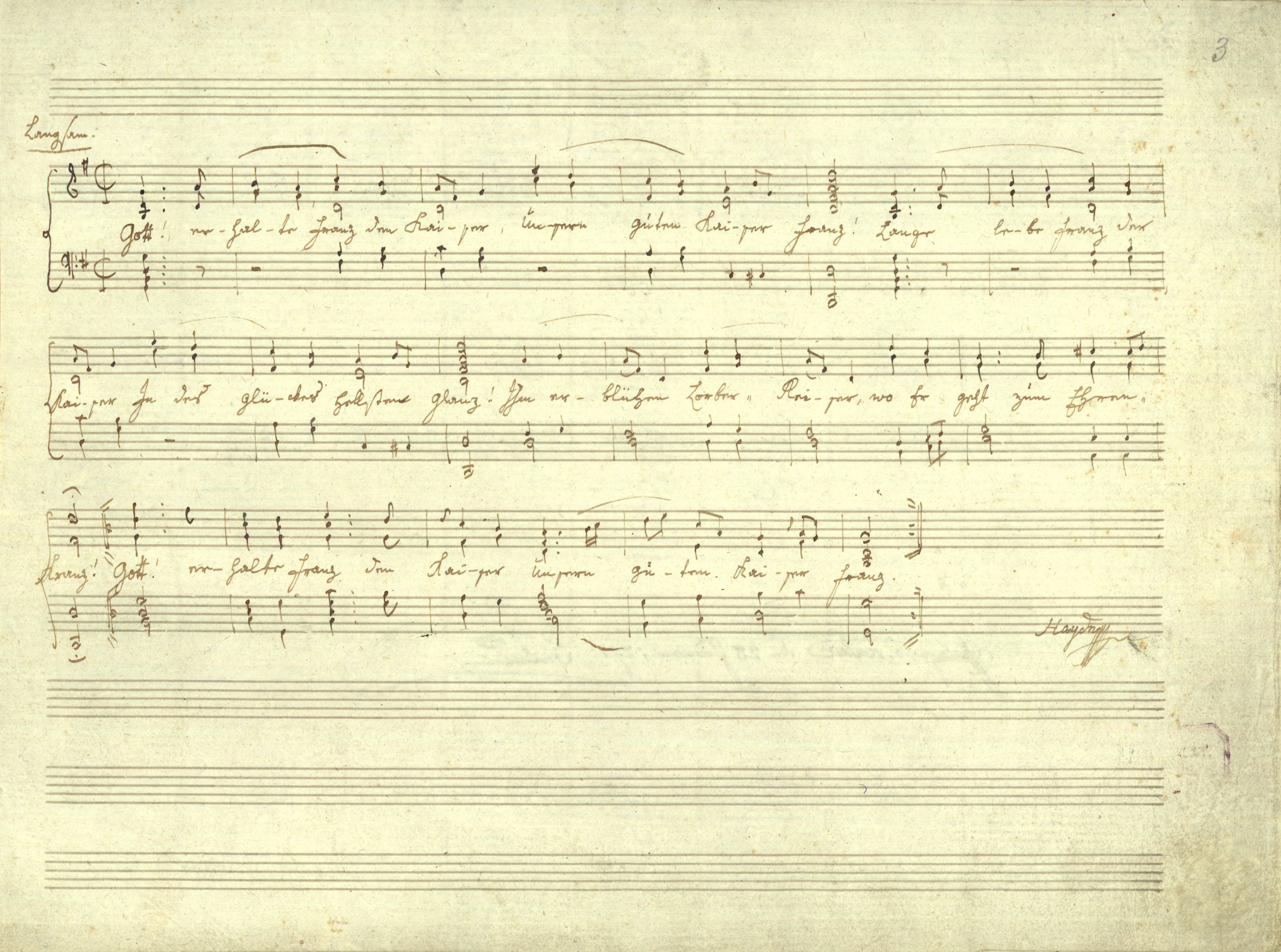
Original copy of "Gott erhalte Franz den Kaiser" in Haydn's hand

A central characteristic of Haydn's music is the development of larger structures out of very short, simple musical motifs, often derived from standard accompanying figures. The music is often quite formally concentrated, and the important musical events of a movement can unfold rather quickly. W. Dean Sutcliffe mentions this in a criticism of contemporary Haydn performance practice:

[Haydn's] music sometime seems to 'live on its nerves' ... It is above all in this respect that Haydn performances often fail, whereby most interpreters lack the mental agility to deal with the ever-changing 'physiognomy' of Haydn's music, subsiding instead into an ease of manner and a concern for broader effects that they have acquired in their playing of Mozart.

Haydn's work was central to the development of what came to be called sonata form. His practice, however, differed in some ways from that of Mozart and Beethoven, his younger contemporaries who likewise excelled in this form of composition. Haydn was particularly fond of the so-called monothematic exposition, in which the music that establishes the dominant key is similar or identical to the opening theme. Haydn also differs from Mozart and Beethoven in his recapitulation sections, where he often rearranges the order of themes compared to the exposition and uses extensive thematic development. Of these "rearranged recapitulations", Rosemary Hughes writes

Having begun to 'develop', he could not stop; his recapitulations begin to take on irregular contours, sometimes sharply condensed, sometimes surprisingly expanded, losing their first tame symmetry to regain a balance of a far higher and more satisfying order.

Haydn's formal inventiveness also led him to integrate the fugue into the classical style and to enrich the rondo form with more cohesive tonal logic (see sonata rondo form). Haydn was also the principal exponent of the double variation form—variations on two alternating themes, which are often major- and minor-mode versions of each other.

=== Character ===
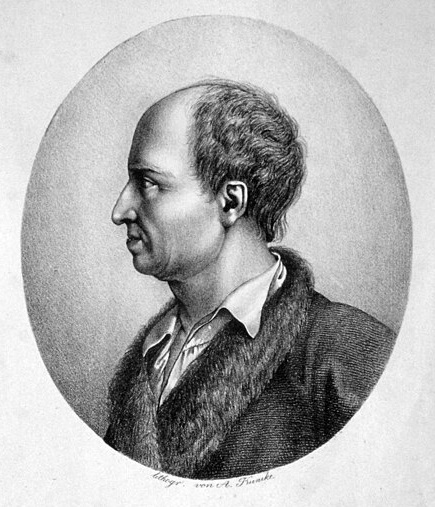
Lithograph of Haydn from about 1830 (posthumous) by Adolph Friedrich Kunike. Landon describes the work as "a good likeness, showing him without his habitual wig (its source is uncertain—possibly the lost plaster bust by Anton Grassi, 1799)".

The Haydn scholar Karl Geiringer has emphasized the sheer joyfulness of much of Haydn's music:

Out of Haydn's love for the beauties of our world grew the gaiety and affirmative spirit apparent throughout all his creative periods ... Even in his advanced age, this gaiety did not entirely desert him. Nurtured by ... a victorious optimism maintained through all the vicissitudes of a long and arduous life, this radiant joyfulness again and again manifested itself, and Haydn considered it his mission to let his fellow beings share in this unique gift.

The sense of bliss often evident in Haydn's music was also noticed by Charles Rosen, who (describing a theme in the piano trio Hob. XV:13), wrote of

Haydn's ability to create an emotion that was completely his own and that no other composer could duplicate – a feeling of ecstasy that is completely unsensual, almost amiable. There is no recipe for producing this effect ...

A modest number of Haydn's works are striking exceptions to this upbeat character. Some excursions into emotional darkness include The Seven Last Words of Christ, the largo movement of the string quartet Op. 76 no. 5, which Haydn marked "mesto" (sorrowful), and the widely admired coda section of his Variations in F minor for piano.

Perhaps more than any other composer's, Haydn's music is known for its humour; specifically, incongruous musical passages heard as jokes. (Note: Steven Isserlis calls him "the funniest of the great composers" (preface to Richard Wigmore, The Faber Pocket Guide to Haydn (Faber, 2011)). Brendel (2001) focuses on the humour of both Haydn and Beethoven. Rosen (1997, p. 111) attributes to Haydn "an aptitude for the facetious that no other composer enjoyed". A book-length study of humour in Haydn is Wheelock 1992.) The most famous example is the sudden loud chord in the slow movement of his "Surprise" symphony; Haydn's many other musical jokes include numerous false endings (e.g., in the quartets Op. 33 No. 2 and Op. 50 No. 3), and the remarkable rhythmic illusion placed in the trio section of the third movement of Op. 50 No. 1. Haydn explained the loud chord in the "Surprise" Symphony: "I was interested in surprising the public with something new, and in making a brilliant debut, so that my student Pleyel, who was at that time engaged by an orchestra in London and whose concerts had opened a week before mine, should not outdo me."

Haydn's fast movements tend to be rhythmically propulsive and often impart a great sense of energy, especially in the finales. Some characteristic examples of Haydn's "rollicking" finale type are found in the "London" Symphony No. 104, the String Quartet Op. 50 No. 1, and the Piano Trio Hob XV: 27. Haydn's early slow movements are usually not too slow in tempo, relaxed, and reflective. Later on, the emotional range of the slow movements increases, notably in the deeply felt slow movements of the quartets Op. 76 Nos. 3 and 5, the Symphonies No. 98 and 102, and the Piano Trio Hob XV: 23. The minuets tend to have a strong downbeat and a clearly popular character. Over time, Haydn turned some of his minuets into "scherzi" which are much faster, at one beat to the bar.

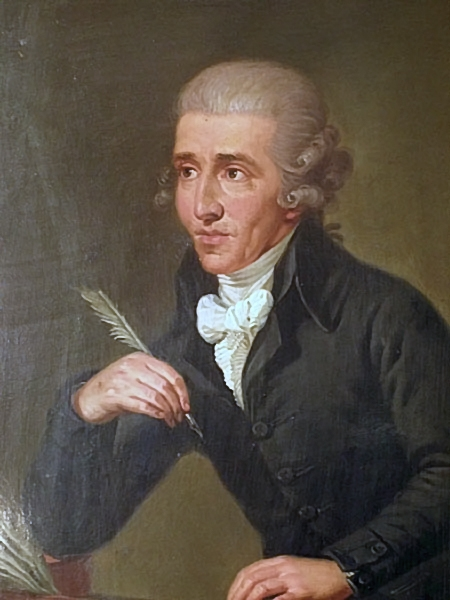
Portrait by Ludwig Guttenbrunn, painted c. 1791–92, depicts Haydn c. 1770

=== Evolution of Haydn's style ===
Haydn's lifetime overlapped substantially with those of the most celebrated masters of Baroque music: he was born 18 years before the death of J. S. Bach and 27 years before that of Handel. Yet the models that influenced him, according to Karl Geiringer, were not at all these composers, but rather the leaders in the earliest development of the emerging Classical style, particularly in Vienna: his employer Johann Georg Reutter, Georg Christoph Wagenseil, and Georg Matthias Monn – none of whom wrote music that is widely played today. This was a period of exploration and uncertainty, and Haydn was himself one of the musical explorers of this time. Fairly early in his career Haydn discovered, and quickly came to revere, the music of a composer from outside Vienna, J. S. Bach's son Carl Philipp Emanuel Bach. Geiringer emphasizes how Haydn was struck by the emotional depth of Bach's work: "Up to then he had been familiar with the gay and superficial idiom of the musical rococo; here he found compositions that deeply stirred and excited him."

Tracing Haydn's subsequent work over the six decades in which it was produced (he composed from about 1749 to 1802), one finds a gradual but steady increase in complexity and musical sophistication, which developed as Haydn learned from his own experience and that of his colleagues. Several important landmarks have been observed in the evolution of Haydn's musical style.

In the late 1760s and early 1770s, Haydn entered a stylistic period known as "Sturm und Drang" ("storm and stress"). This term is taken from a literary movement of about the same time, though it appears that the musical development actually preceded the literary one by a few years. (Note: See Webster (2002, p. 18): "the term has been criticized: taken from the title of a play of 1776 by Maximilian Klinger, it properly pertains to a literary movement of the middle and late 1770s rather than a musical one of about 1768–1772".) The musical language of this period is similar to what went before, but it is deployed in work that is more intensely expressive, especially in the works in minor keys. James Webster describes the works of this period as "longer, more passionate, and more daring". Some of the most famous compositions of this time are the "Trauer" (Mourning) Symphony No. 44, "Farewell" Symphony No. 45, the Piano Sonata in C minor (Hob. XVI/20, L. 33), and the six "Sun" Quartets Op. 20, all from c. 1771–72. It was also around this time that Haydn became interested in writing fugues in the Baroque style, and three of the Op. 20 quartets end with a fugue.

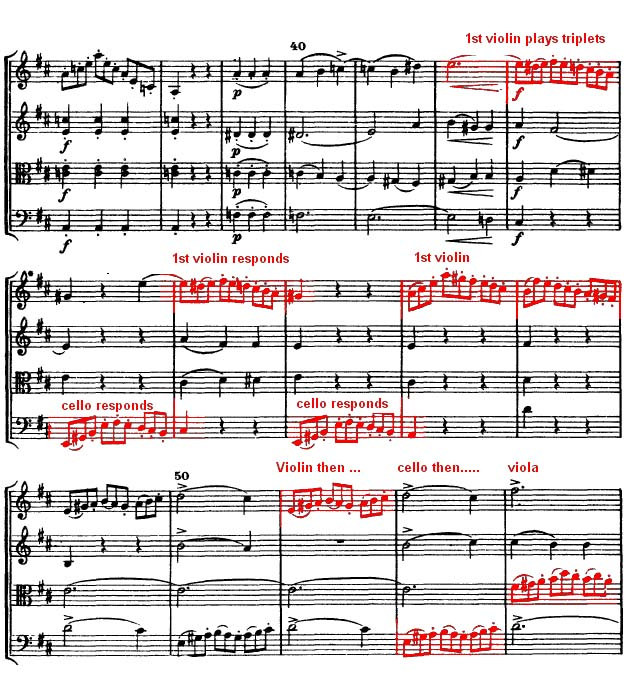
A section of his string quartet, Op. 20 No. 4 showing interplay between the first violin and cello

Following the climax of the "Sturm und Drang", Haydn returned to a lighter, more overtly entertaining style. There are no quartets from this period, and the symphonies take on new features: the scoring often includes trumpets and timpani. These changes are often related to a major shift in Haydn's professional duties, which moved him away from instrumental music and toward the production of comic operas. Several of the operas were Haydn's own work (see List of operas by Joseph Haydn); these are seldom performed today. Haydn sometimes recycled his opera music in symphonic works, which helped him continue his career as a symphonist during this hectic decade.

In 1779, an important change in Haydn's contract permitted him to publish his compositions without prior authorization from his employer. This may have encouraged Haydn to rekindle his career as a composer of instrumental music. The change made itself felt most dramatically in 1781, when Haydn published the six Op. 33 String Quartets, announcing (in a letter to potential purchasers) that they were written in "a new and completely special way". (Note: Original German "Neu, gantz besonderer Art") Charles Rosen has argued that this assertion on Haydn's part was not just sales talk but meant quite seriously, and he points out a number of important advances in Haydn's compositional technique that appear in these quartets, advances that mark the advent of the Classical style in full flower. These include a fluid form of phrasing, in which each motif emerges from the previous one without interruption, the practice of letting accompanying material evolve into melodic material, and a kind of "Classical counterpoint" in which each instrumental part maintains its own integrity. These traits continue in the many quartets that Haydn wrote after Op. 33. (Note: Rosen's case that Opus 33 represents a "revolution in style" (1971 and 1997, 116) can be found in chapter III.1 of Rosen (1997). For dissenting views, see Larsen (1980, p. 102) and Webster (1991). For discussion of the development of the same trend in Haydn's style in the symphonies that preceded the Opus 33 quartets see Rosen (1988, pp. 181–186).)

In the 1790s, stimulated by his England journeys, Haydn developed what Rosen calls his "popular style", a method of composition that, with unprecedented success, created music having great popular appeal but retaining a learned and rigorous musical structure. (Note: Rosen discusses the popular style in ch. VI.1 of Rosen (1997).) An important element of the popular style was the frequent use of folk or folk-like material (see Haydn and folk music). Haydn took care to deploy this material in appropriate locations, such as the endings of sonata expositions or the opening themes of finales. In such locations, the folk material serves as an element of stability, helping to anchor the larger structure. Haydn's popular style can be heard in virtually all of his later work, including the twelve "London" symphonies, the late quartets and piano trios, and the two late oratorios.

The return to Vienna in 1795 marked the last turning point in Haydn's career. Although his musical style evolved little, his intentions as a composer changed. While he had been a servant, and later a busy entrepreneur, Haydn wrote his works quickly and in profusion, with frequent deadlines. As a rich man, Haydn now felt that he had the privilege of taking his time and writing for posterity. This is reflected in the subject matter of The Creation (1798) and The Seasons (1801), which address the meaning of life and the purpose of humankind and represent an attempt to render the sublime in music. Haydn's new intentions also meant that he was willing to spend much time on a single work: both oratorios took him over a year to complete. Haydn once remarked that he had worked on The Creation so long because he wanted it to last.

The change in Haydn's approach was important in the history of classical music, as other composers soon followed his lead. When Beethoven left Bonn for Vienna in 1792, his patron, Count Ferdinand Ernst Gabriel von Waldstein, wrote "You will receive the spirit of Mozart from the hands of Haydn." In 1814 E. T. A. Hoffmann wrote that Haydn, Mozart, and Beethoven "developed a new art." Anthony Tommasini describes Haydn's skill in word painting, as heard in The Creation: "It opens with an orchestral prelude, 'The Representation of Chaos,' an episode that evokes the earth without form and void. Haydn's music is hauntingly elusive and harmonically wayward, with melodic fragments and eerie instrumental effects. During the first halting, tentative choral episode, when the choir relates God's words, 'Let there be light,' at that climactic moment—the word 'light'—the music bursts into a shimmering C-major chord, music so glorious and so bright you almost feel the need to squint."

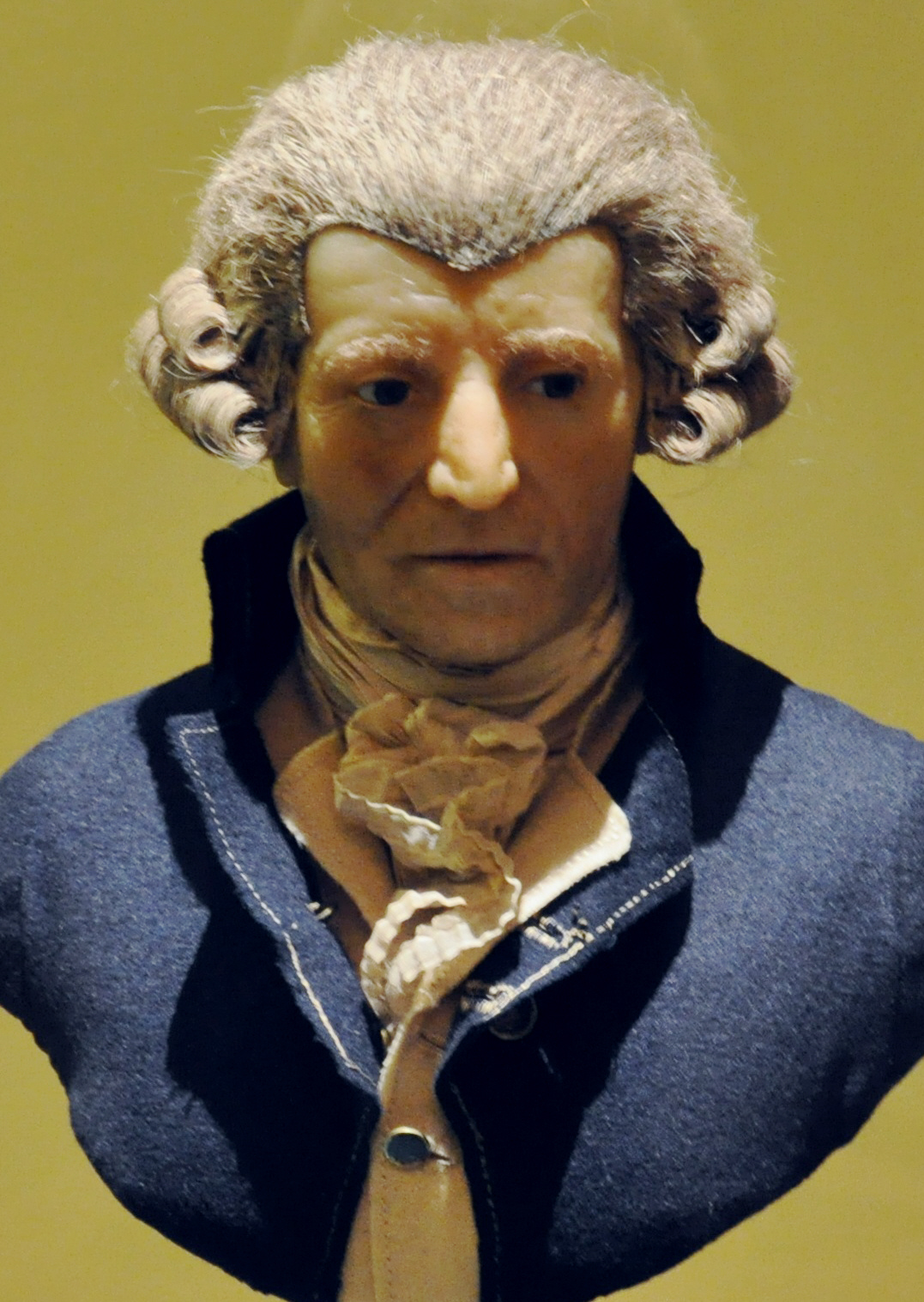
Wax sculpture of Haydn by Franz Thaler, c. 1800

=== Catalogues ===
It was a major task for scholars of the 20th century to locate and publish all of the works that Haydn composed, and also to screen out the great number of compositions by other composers that had circulated (often due to unscrupulous publishers) under Haydn's name. These studies culminated in the great catalog of Haydn's compositions, completed in 1978, by Anthony van Hoboken. His work, usually called the Hoboken catalogue assigns a catalogue number to each work, called its Hoboken number (abbreviated H. or Hob.). These Hoboken numbers are often used in identifying Haydn's compositions.

Haydn's string quartets also have Hoboken numbers, but they are usually identified instead by their opus numbers, which have the advantage of indicating the groups of six quartets that Haydn published together. For example, the string quartet Opus 76, No. 3 is the third of the six quartets published in 1799 as Opus 76.

=== Instruments ===
An "Anton Walter in Wien" fortepiano used by the composer is now on display in the Haydn-Haus Eisenstadt. In Vienna in 1788 Haydn bought himself a fortepiano made by Wenzel Schantz. When the composer was visiting London for the first time, an English piano builder, John Broadwood, supplied him with a concert grand.

== See also ==
- List of compositions by Joseph Haydn
- List of concertos by Joseph Haydn
- List of masses by Joseph Haydn
- List of operas by Joseph Haydn
- List of piano trios by Joseph Haydn
- List of solo piano compositions by Joseph Haydn
- List of string quartets by Joseph Haydn
- List of symphonies by Joseph Haydn
- Joseph Haydn's ethnicity
- Haydn's birthplace
- List of Haydn's residences
