= Morzin Palace =

Building in Prague

Coordinates: 50°05′18″N 14°24′03″E

- Morzinský palác
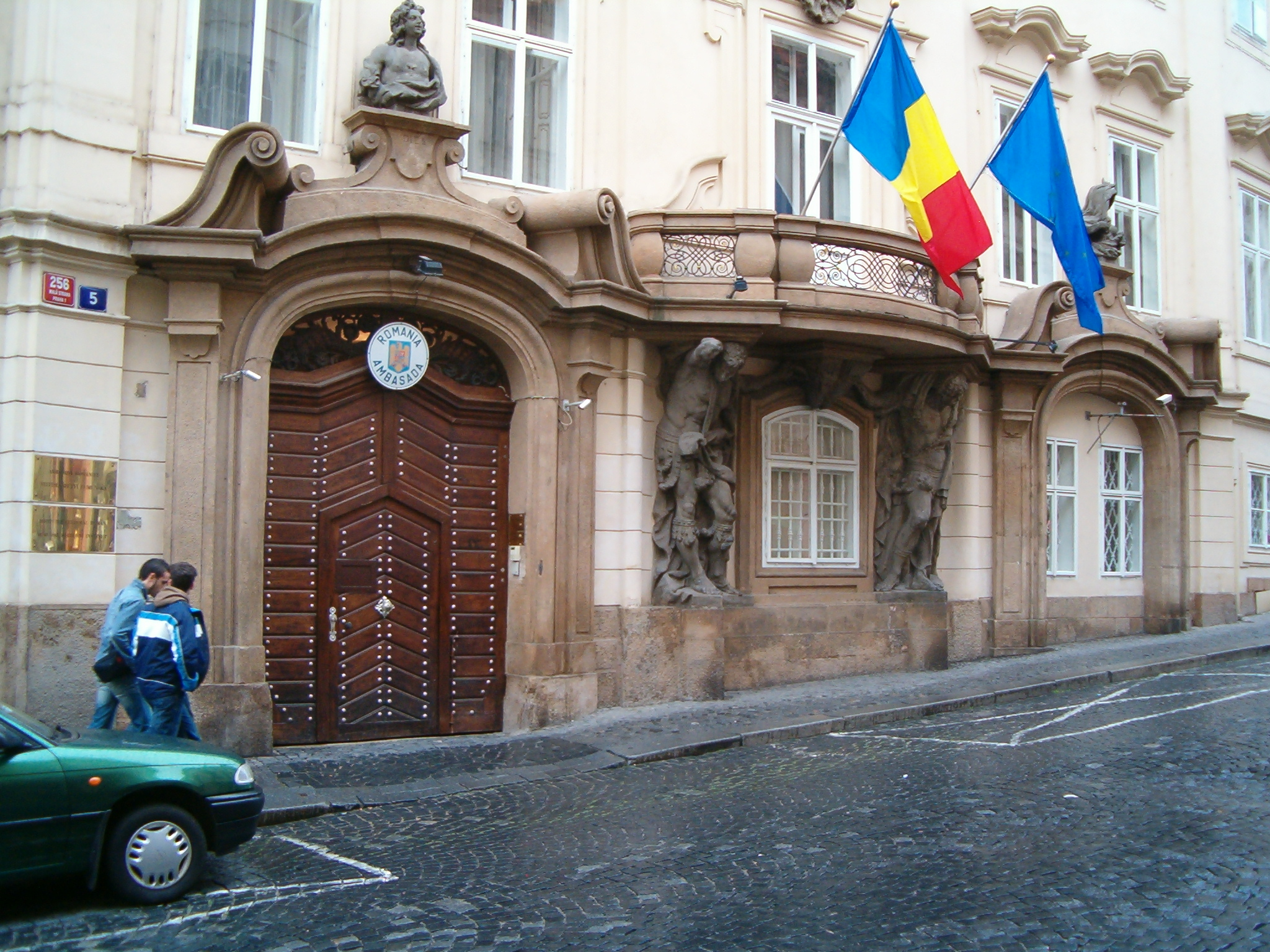
- Front elevation (2007)

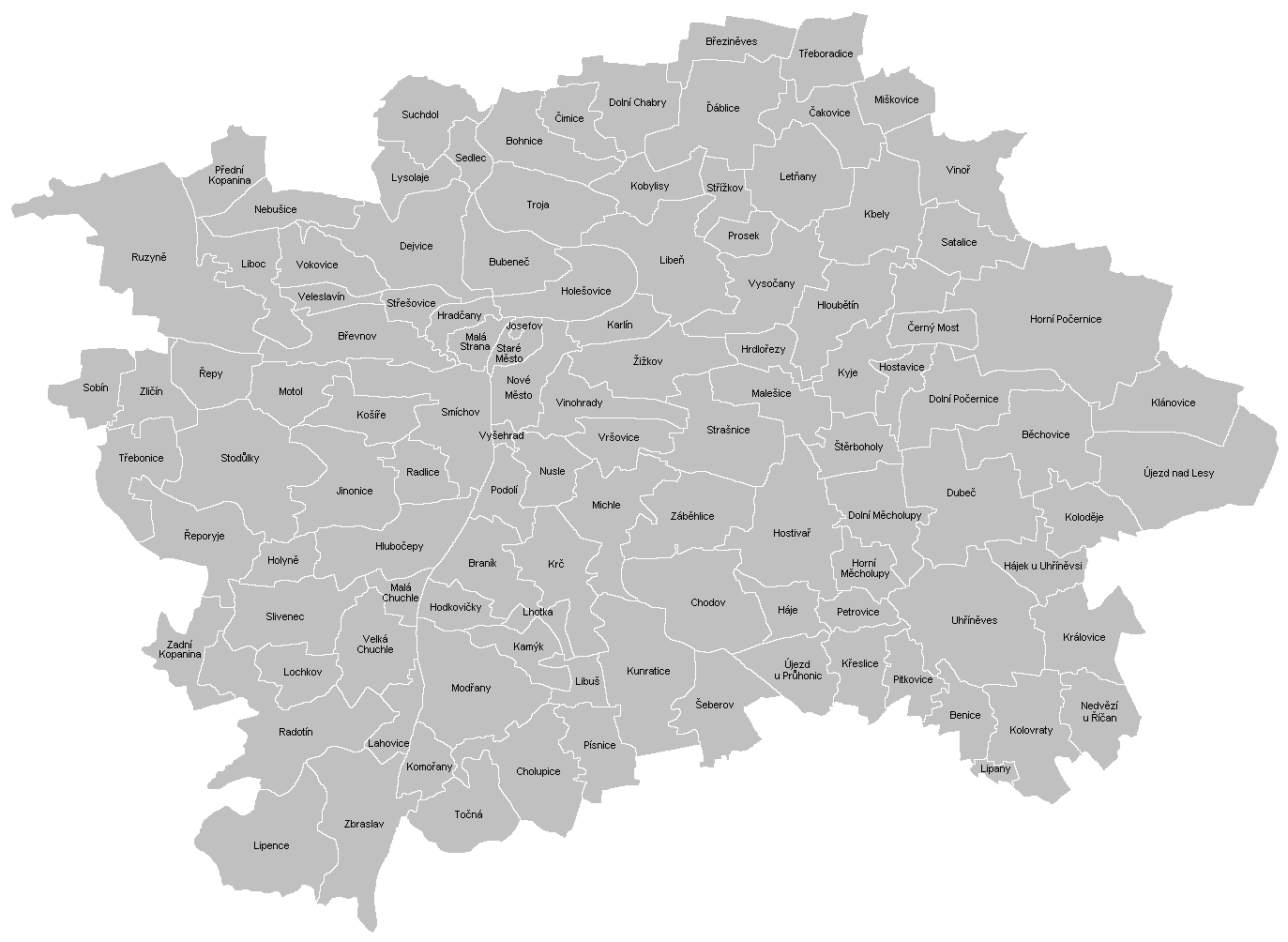
- Location within Greater Prague

General information
- Type: Palace
- Architectural style: Prague High Baroque
- Location: District of Malá Strana, Nerudova Street 5/256, Prague
- Construction started: 1713
- Completed: 1714

Technical details
- Floor count: 2

Design and construction
- Architect: Jan Blažej Santini-Aichel

Morzin Palace (Czech: Morzinský palác, German: Palais Morzin) is a baroque palace in Malá Strana, Prague, named after the Morzin family for whom it was built.

== History ==
The previous town houses on the site were sold by Maximilian von Wallenstein to the Morzin family in 1668. In 1713 Václav Morzin (1676–1737) commissioned Jan Blažej Santini-Aichel to create one palace on the site, and building work was completed the following year. It remained in the Morzin family until 1881.

== Embassy of Romania ==
The Embassy of Romania in Prague is currently located at Morzin Palace, opposite the Italian Embassy. Its facade features two columns in the shape of chained Moors, a pun on the name of the building.

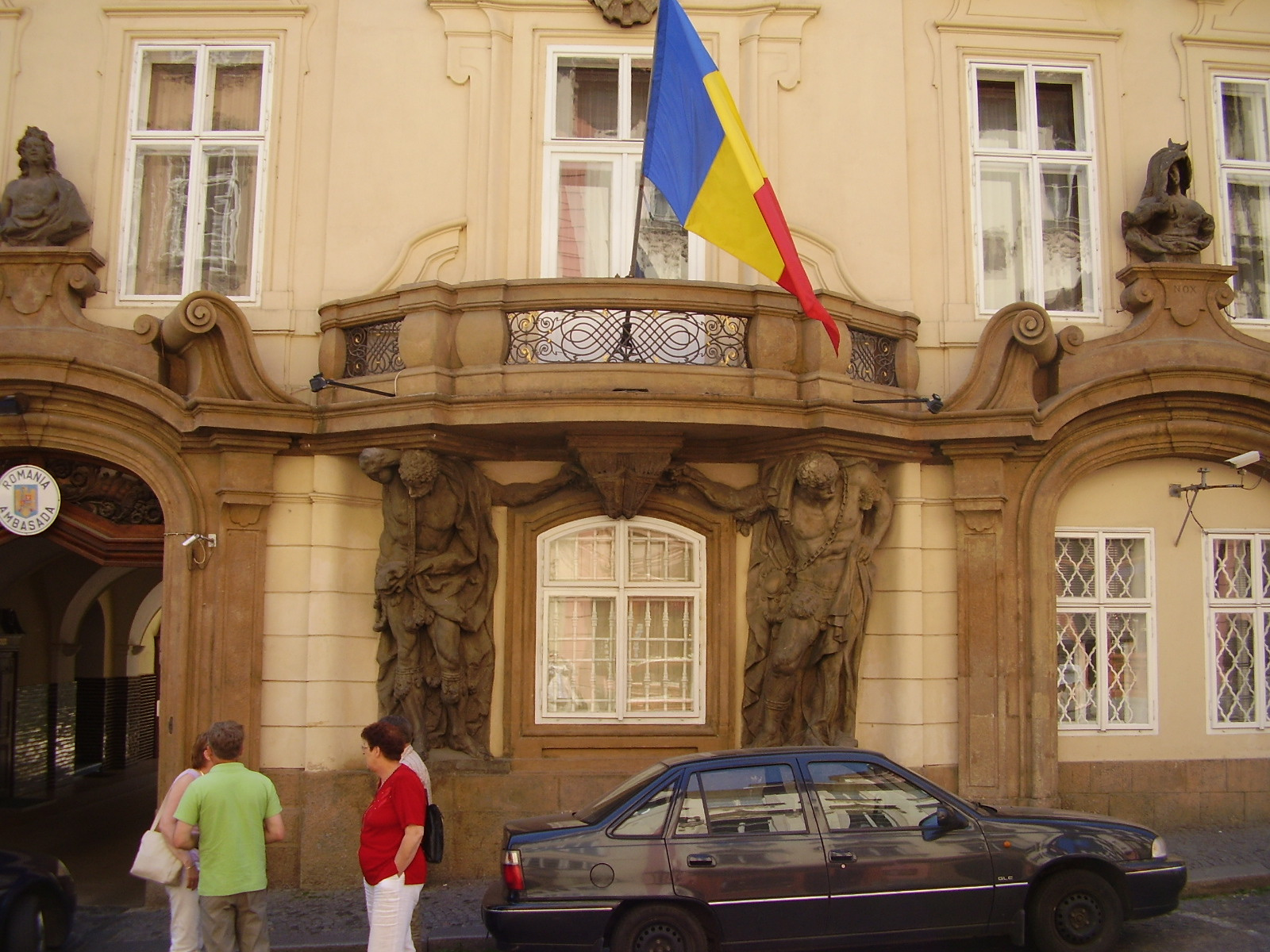
The facade of the Romanian Embassy

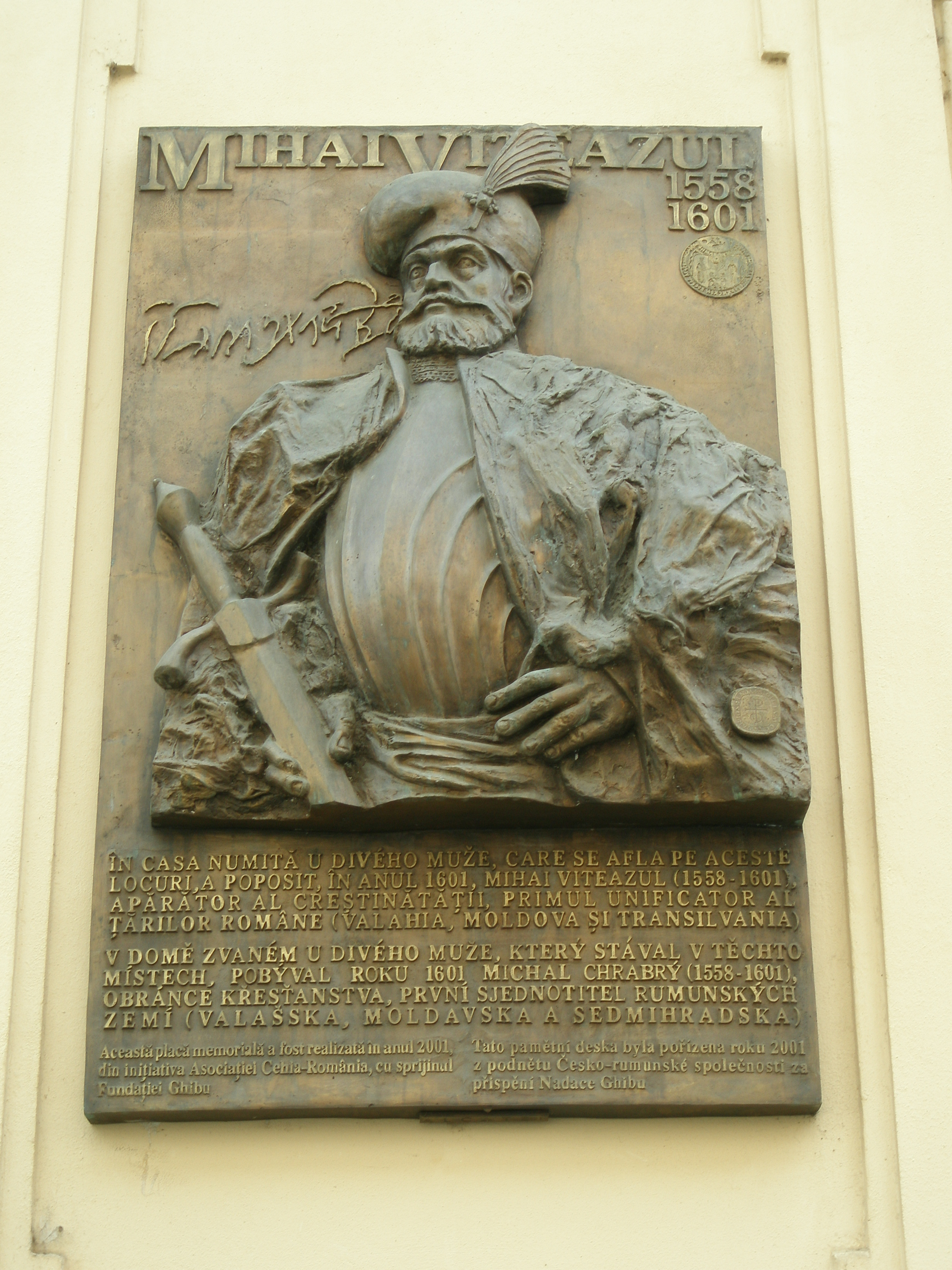
Commemoration of Mihai Viteazu at the facade

== See also ==
- The Morzin palace in Dolní Lukavice
- Romanian diplomatic missions
