= Embassy of Italy, Prague =

Building in Prague, Czech Republic

Coordinates: 50°5′19.07″N 14°24′1.24″E

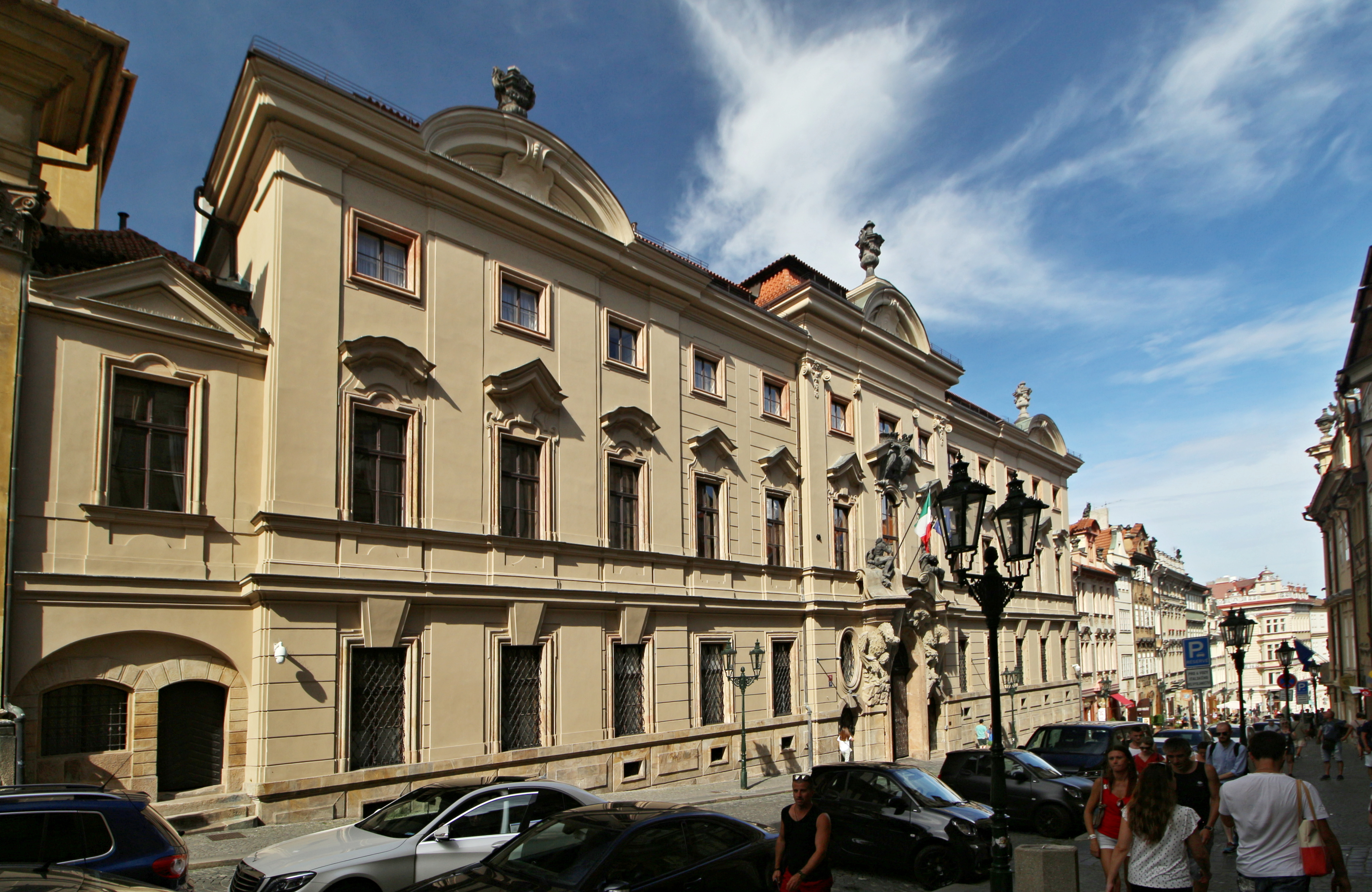
The facade of the Italian Embassy

The Embassy of Italy in Prague (Czech: Italské velvyslanectví v Praze, Italian: Ambasciata d'Italia a Praga) is located on Nerudova street in Mala Strana, Prague, next door to the church of Our Lady of Caetans and opposite the Romanian Embassy.

It occupies the large Thun-Hohenstein Palace, which is named after the Thun und Hohenstein family. The embassy's baroque facade features a doorway guarded by two carved eagles.

== Bibliography ==
- Francesco Saverio Nisio (2021). Ambasciata d'Italia a Praga (PDF) (in Italian). Prague: Fondazione Eleutheria. As described in Stefano Baldi. "Libri fotografici sulle Rappresentanze diplomatiche italiane all'estero".
