= Joseph Haydn's ethnicity =

The ethnicity of the composer Joseph Haydn was a controversial matter in Haydn scholarship during a period lasting from the late 19th to the mid-20th century. The principal contending ethnicities were Croat and German. Mainstream musical scholarship today adopts the second of these two hypotheses.

== Kuhač's Croatian hypothesis ==
During the late 19th century, the Croatian ethnologist Franjo Kuhač gathered a great number of Croat folk tunes in fieldwork. Kuhač was struck by the resemblance of a number of these tunes to themes found in Haydn's works, and suggested that Haydn knew these tunes and incorporated them into his work. Other scholars disagreed, suggesting instead that the Haydn original themes had circulated among the people, evolving gradually into more folk-like forms. For details and examples, see Haydn and folk music.

Haydn never set foot in Croatia, but he almost certainly lived in the vicinity of Croatian speakers. This is because migration in previous centuries had resulted in a considerable number of Croats dwelling far to the north of Croatia in the Austro-Hungarian border region where Haydn was born and spent most of his life. This aspect of Kuhač's claim is considered uncontroversial, though the relative fraction of the population that was Croatian-speaking is in dispute.

Kuhač went on to claim that the reason Haydn used so many Croatian folk tunes in his music is that he was himself a Croat; that is, a member of the Croat diaspora. As such, he would have been a native speaker of Croatian and a participant in Croatian folk culture. Kuhač also claimed that the name "Haydn" is of Croatian origin ("Hajdin"), and likewise for the name of Haydn's mother, Maria Koller.

Kuhač wrote in Croatian, which would have been a barrier to scholarly transmission at the time. However, his works were studied by the English-speaking musicologist Henry Hadow, who promulgated them further in his book Haydn: A Croatian Composer (1897) and in the second and third editions (1904–1910; 1927) of the prestigious Grove Dictionary.

== The "Haydn as German" hypothesis ==
In the 1930s, the German musicologist Ernst Fritz Schmid took up the issue of Haydn's origins, searching in parish records and elsewhere for evidence of Haydn's ancestry. He concluded on the basis of his research that Haydn's ethnic roots were not Croat, but German, and that the names "Haydn" and "Koller" are of German origin.

Schroeder (2009) describes Schmid's work as entirely convincing; "an enormously detailed examination of Haydn's genealogy" that "put all [alternative] theories to rest." He notes further, however, that the "timing of this type of study was unfortunate. Only a few years later similar genealogical studies affirming the German (and Aryan) roots of the Germanic musical giants had become a musicological preoccupation as a propaganda service to the National Socialist government ... Schmid's book pre-dates those sponsored by Propaganda Minister Joseph Goebbels and his chief ideologue Alfred Rosenberg, but it is a matter of regret that his proved to be a model for those which followed."

== The Haydn-as-German hypothesis and modern scholarship ==
Despite its acquired associations with National Socialist musicology, Schmid's work has over the long term convinced not just Schroeder, but all mainstream Haydn scholarship.

Karl Geiringer endorses Schmid's views, both in his Haydn biography and in the fourth edition of the Grove Dictionary. In the 1982 revision of his biography, Geiringer wrote

Schmid undert[oo]k elaborate genealogical research, tracing the family names back to the Middle Ages and producing most valuable data about Haydn's ancestors. According to his final conclusions, there can be no doubt that the Haydn and Koller families were of German origin.

Schmid's views were also endorsed by French scholar Michel Brenet and by Rosemary Hughes in their Haydn biographies. H. C. Robbins Landon devoted the opening pages of his massive work Haydn: Chronicle and Works to a long summary and warm endorsement of Schmid's research.

Danish scholar Jens Peter Larsen, writing in the 1980 New Grove, says of this question:

... the matter must be regarded as settled by [Schmid's work]. It may well be said that 'Schmid was even more intent to prove Haydn a German than Kuhač and Hadow had been to prove him a Slav' [quotation from Scott, in the fifth edition of Grove]. But the weight of the documentary evidence that supports his case is decisive.

In the current version of the Grove Dictionary, the Haydn biography (by James Webster) does not even mention the old controversy, other than to cite Schmid's work in the bibliography. Neither Kuhač nor Hadow is cited.

== Haydn's remark on Croats ==
Curiously, Haydn himself is recorded as having made a somewhat disparaging remark about Croats. His words were remembered by the composer and pianist Friedrich Kalkbrenner, who was Haydn's student in Vienna around the year 1800; he wrote them down in his memoirs, published in 1824. In the memoirs, Kalkbrenner refers to himself in the third person.

He received instruction [from Haydn] during the remainder of his stay at Vienna, which was nearly two years. In the first quartet he attempted to write under this great master - the young artist thought he must put forth all his learning as well as all his imagination, and when he produced it, anticipated that he must inevitably receive no usual quantity of praise. The moment Haydn cast his eyes upon it, he exclaimed - hey day! what have we here! Calmuc, Siberian, Cossack, Croat - all the barbarians of the world jumbled together - he laughed heartily, but tempered his severity with some commendation - telling him that there was by far too much fire, but that it was better to have too much than too little and that time and experience would bring his exertions to more favourable issue.
