= Haydn and folk music =

This article discusses the role of folk music in the career of the composer Joseph Haydn (1732–1809).

== Background: folk music and classical music ==
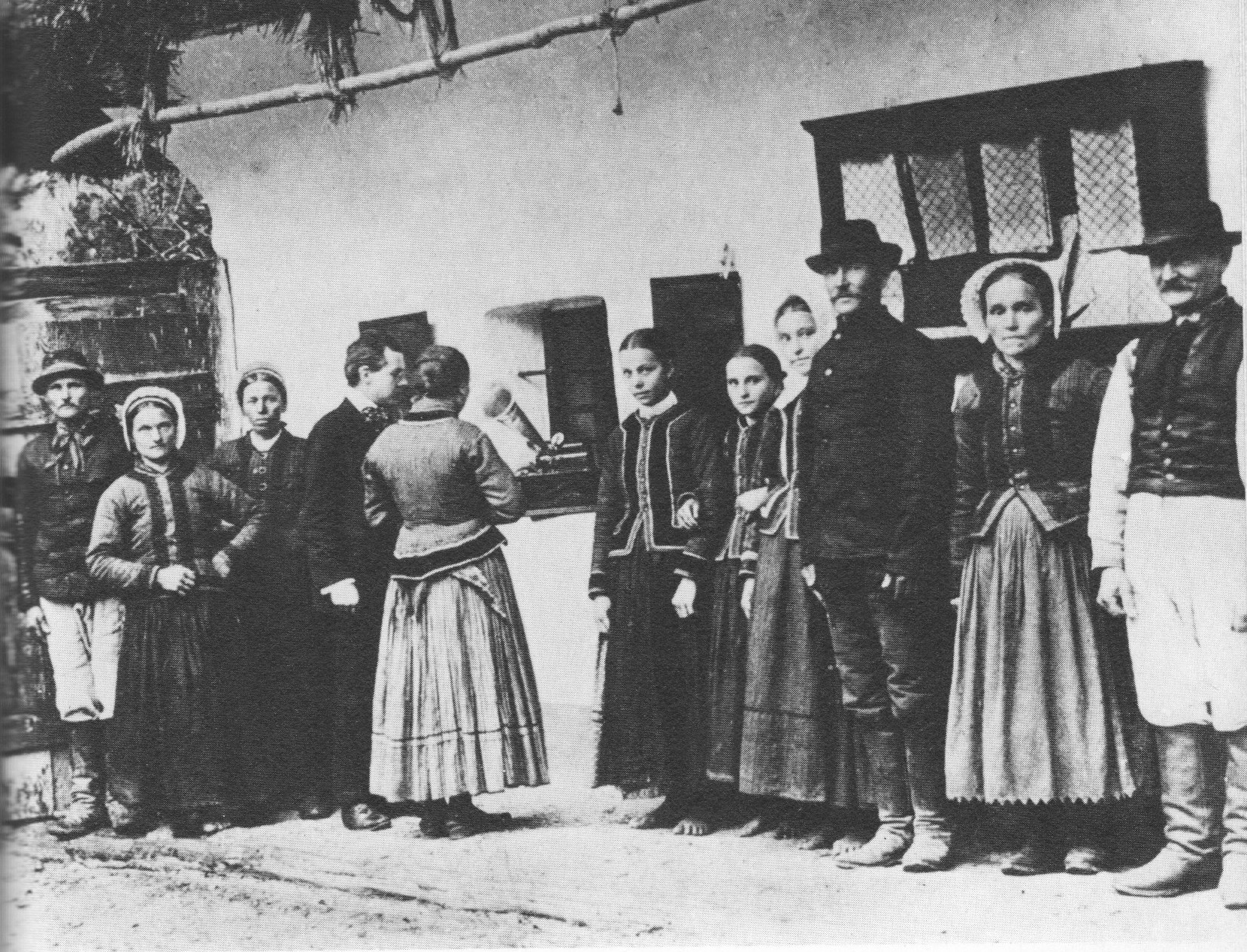
Béla Bartók recording peasant singers in Zobordarázs, Kingdom of Hungary (now Nitra, Slovakia), 1907. The location is about 100 km. from Haydn's birthplace, the time 98 years after Haydn's lifetime.

The term "folk music" is used in different ways; in the present context, the term is employed as in the work of Cecil Sharp (1907) and similarly oriented scholars. For Sharp, "folk music" designates unwritten music, transmitted from person to person within a community and thereby passed down through the generations; for this reason, music of this sort is often called traditional music. The communities that nurtured such a tradition were, at least originally, typically rural and/or preindustrial. As economic development led communities to adopt other forms of music, folk music scholars were motivated to engage in fieldwork, whose purpose was to preserve the old music in published form by eliciting songs and tunes from still-active participants.

Since Sharp's time the concept of "folk music" has become the object of controversy and dissension; for an overview see Pegg (2001). For present purposes it suffices that the fieldworkers, venturing forth from their urban bases into rural areas, were frequently enchanted by the music they encountered and spent years at their task; this was the case, for instance, for Cecil Sharp in both Somerset and Appalachia. The music that Béla Bartók gathered in eastern Europe was regarded by him as possessing "incomparable beauty and perfection."

The music the fieldworkers brought back would sometimes became popular with the urban public; for instances see Scots Musical Museum and Loraine Wyman. A number of composers in the European classical music tradition became interested in folk material and integrated it into their own compositions; several composers spent much of their time doing fieldwork in folk music; in addition to Bartók there was Ralph Vaughan Williams, Percy Grainger, George Butterworth, Zoltán Kodály, and Mily Balakirev.

The composer Joseph Haydn (1732-1809) fits into this picture in three ways. First, he was himself born into a rural community, indeed a particular family, where traditional music was performed with enthusiasm. Second, he is thought to have used a variety of folk material in his own compositions. Lastly, Haydn served a system whereby folk material was promulgated to urban consumers: for publishers he provided musical accompaniments to facilitate the domestic performance of folk songs.

== Haydn's early years ==
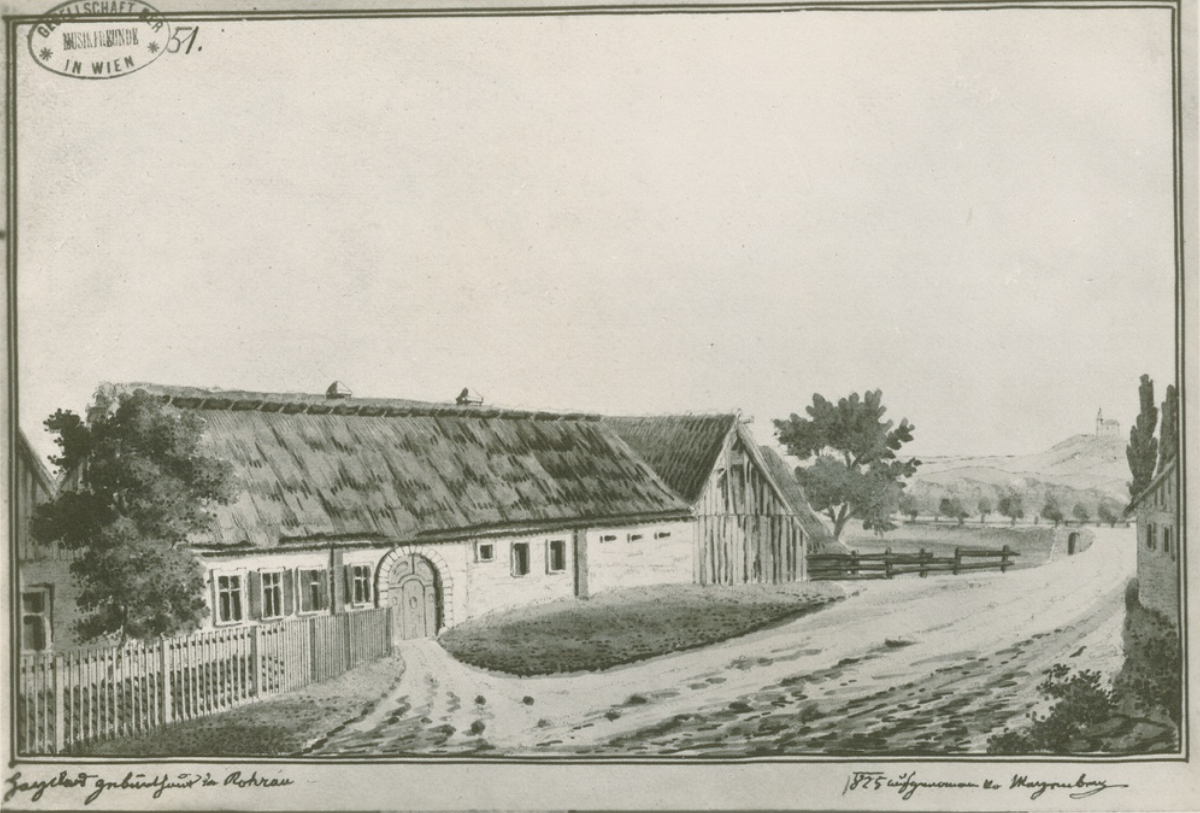
The house in Rohrau, Austria, where Joseph Haydn was born. Unknown artist, 1825

One of the tropes of Haydn biography is his musical emergence, during early childhood, within a community that fostered folk music. His parents were working people (his mother Anna Maria was a former cook, his father Mathias a master wheelwright). They lived in a small village called Rohrau, about a day's journey from the urban hub of Vienna. They had no formal training in music. Thus, Haydn's early upbringing was different from that of Mozart or Beethoven, both of them children of professional musicians who sought to have their sons succeed them in the musical profession.

On the other hand, there is evidence that Haydn's early childhood was quite musical, focusing on the traditional music of his community. The most detailed account comes from the 1810 biography by Albert Christoph Dies, written on the basis of interviews with the elderly Haydn. In the chapter on Haydn's childhood Dies notes the following, which he learned in his first interview on 15 April 1805.

In his youth, [Haydn's father] journeyed about, following the custom of his trade, and reached Frankfurt am Main, where he learned to play the harp a little and, because he liked to sing, to accompany himself on the harp as well as he could. Afterwards, when he was married, he kept the habit of singing a little to amuse himself. All the children had to join in his concerts, to learn the songs, and to develop their singing voices... Haydn still remembers those songs and innocent times with pleasure.

Georg August Griesinger wrote in his own biography (1810; also based on interviews with the composer), that "the melodies of [his father's] songs were so deeply impressed in Joseph Haydn's memory that he could still recall them in advanced old age." One further detail is provided by the composer's own Autobiographical sketch, which he prepared in 1776 for an encyclopedia: that his father played the harp "without knowing a note of music."

This traditional musical context did not last long in Haydn's case. Griesinger's narrative continues as follows:

One day the headmaster from the neighboring town of Hainburg, a distant relative of the Haydn family, came to Rohrau. Meister Mathias and his wife gave their usual little concert, and five-year-old Joseph sat near his parents and sawed at his left arm with a stick, as if he were accompanying on the violin. It astonished the schoolteacher that the boy observed time so correctly. He inferred from this a natural talent for music and advised the parents to send their Sepperl (an Austrian diminutive for Joseph) to Hainburg so that he might be set to the acquisition of an art that in time would unfailingly open to him the prospect "of becoming a clergyman". His parents, ardent admirers of the clergy, joyfully seized this proposal, and in his sixth year Joseph Haydn went to the headmaster in Hainburg. Here, he received instruction in reading and writing, in catechism, in singing, and in almost all wind and string instruments, even the timpani.

From this point on, Haydn lived and learned within the mainstream professional musical tradition of his time. This professional "mainstreaming" only intensified when, three years later, Haydn was recruited to become a choirboy at St. Stephen's Cathedral in Vienna by the music director there, Georg Reutter, and thus found a role at a major center of professional music-making. His training and experience at St. Stephen's was the foundation of what eventually became a very successful career as a professional musician.

== Haydn's possible uses of folk music in his own compositions ==
Scholars have argued that Haydn's childhood connection to folk music remained with him for the rest of his life: throughout his career, he took advantage of folk tunes he knew, deploying them in strategic locations in his music. The tunes may have been remembered from childhood, but they may also have been learned later on: from 1761 to 1790, Haydn spent most of his time in the countryside, either in the small town of Eisenstadt or at the isolated palace of Esterháza in rural Hungary, since these were the preferred residences of the princely Esterházy family for whom Haydn worked. The surroundings were quite ethnically mixed: alongside the German-speaking Austrians, the Hungarians, and the local Gypsies, there were also many Croatians, living in ethnic enclaves far to the north of their Croatian homeland. Hence, in principle, a rich variety of folk music forms was accessible to the composer.

Figuring out what Haydn actually used is a vexed problem, and it is unlikely that any individual proposed attribution can be regarded as a certainty (there is no testimony at all from the composer himself). Moreover, even given a possible folk song borrowing, the attribution of the tune to a particular ethnicity is not straightforward, because (as David Schroeder notes) "folk tunes are frequently transmitted across national boundaries". Schroeder gives the following cautionary tale: "The source for a tune in the opening movement of an early cassation for string quintet (Hob. II:2) is identified by [Franjo] Kuhač as a Croatian drinking song, 'Nikaj na svetu', and by [Ernst Fritz] Schmid as a German folksong, 'Es trieb ein Schaefer den Berg hinan'". With these caveats in place, the following section gives some of the folk sources that have been adduced for Haydn's music.

=== Austrian folk music ===
The "Capriccio in G major on the folksong 'Acht Sauschneider müssen sein'", Hob. XVII:1 (1765), is an example of an Austrian folk tune seen in Haydn's music. This work is a theme and variations on a children's song; for lyrics and discussion see this link. In addition, much of Haydn's dance music is claimed to be based on Austrian folk models.

=== Gypsy music ===
A more important influence on Haydn was the work of the gypsy musicians. These musicians were, in the strictest sense, not folk musicians, but professionals who had a strong folk background. They occasionally wrote down their compositions or had them written down for them.

The gypsy musicians were employed by Haydn's patrons, the wealthy Eszterházy family, for two purposes. They traveled from inn to inn with military recruiters, playing the verbunkos or recruitment dance. They also were retained to play light entertainment music in the palace courtyard. On such occasions, Haydn was virtually certain to have heard their music; and some scholars have suggested that Haydn may have occasionally incorporated Gypsy musicians into his ensemble.

Haydn paid tribute to the gypsy musicians in (at least) three of his compositions.

- His most famous piano trio, Hob XV:25 in G major, concludes with a movement that Haydn called (in the published English version) "Rondo in the Gypsies' Stile".
- The minuet of his String Quartet Opus 20 no. 4 was marked by Haydn as "Alla zingarese", which is Italian for "in the Gypsy style". This minuet has the interesting property of being written in 3/4 time, but sounding to the ear like 2/4.
- The finale of Keyboard Concerto in D is marked Rondo all'ungherese. This is generally taken to refer to gypsy music and not Hungarian folk music—in fact, authentic Hungarian folk music was not widely known until much later, when fieldwork was carried out by Béla Bartók and others.

=== Croatian folk music ===
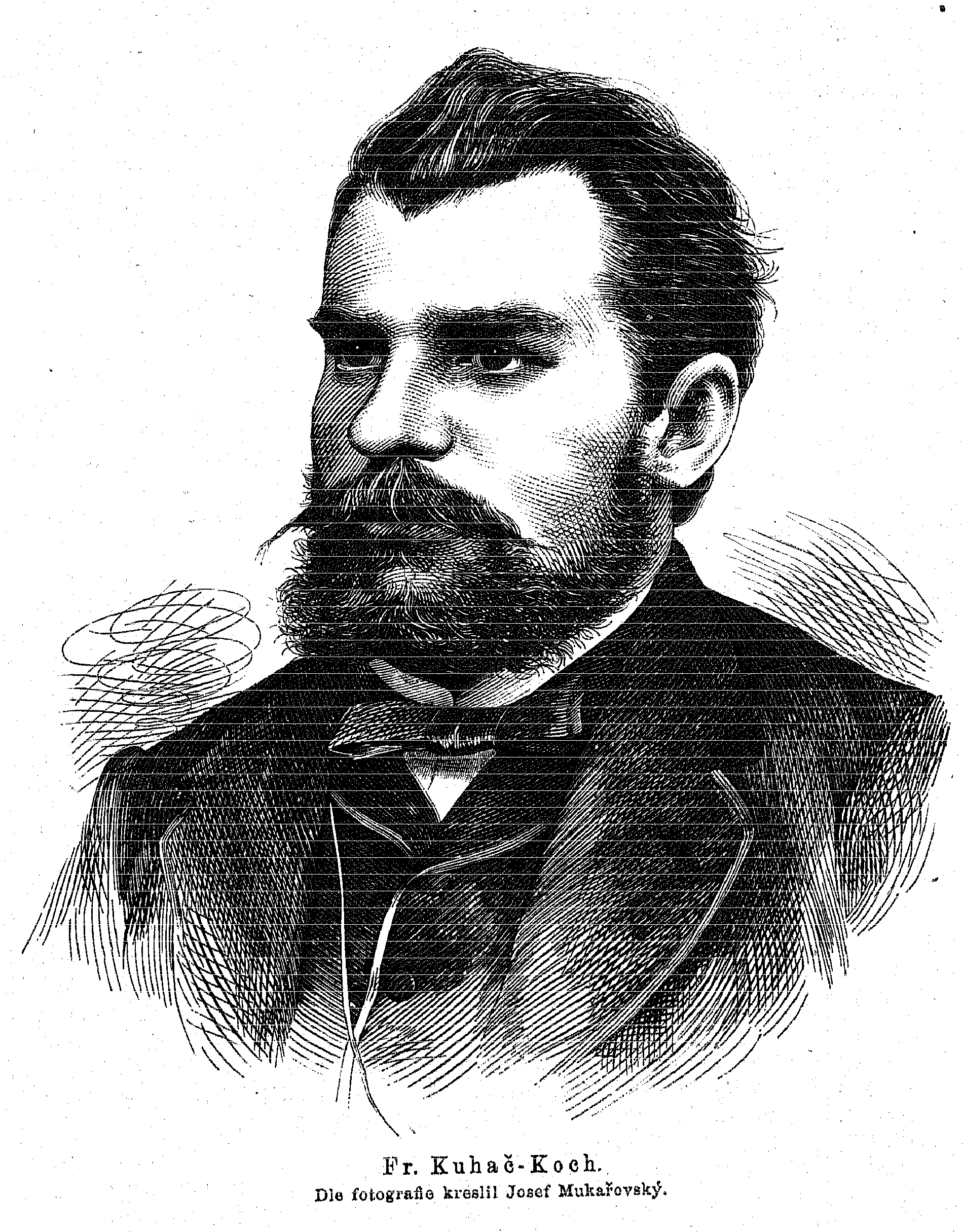
Franjo Kuhač (1874)

The researcher who first propounded the view that Haydn's music abounds in Croatian folk tunes was the Croatian ethnologist Franjo Kuhač, who gathered a great number of Croatian tunes in field work. Kuhač's views, published in Croatian in his Josip Haydn i hrvatske narodne popievke (Zagreb, 1880) were made better known in English speaking countries by the musicologist Henry Hadow in his book A Croatian Composer (1897) and in various editions of the Grove Dictionary. Kuhač and Hadow published a number of cases of Croatian folk tunes gathered in field work judged to have been incorporated into Haydn's compositions.

As noted above, it is no barrier to this theory that Haydn never visited Croatia: the Austro-Hungarian border region in which the composer spent his first years included a large number of people living in Croatian ethnic enclaves.

Here are themes from Haydn's work held to have originated in Croatian folk music.

- The opening theme of the finale of Haydn's Symphony No. 104 (the "London" Symphony) is said to be based on the Croatian traditional song "Oj, Jelena, Jelena, jabuka zelena" ("Oh, Helen, Helen, green apple of mine").
- The "Drumroll" Symphony no. 103, is said to contain four Croatian themes, found in the first, second and fourth movements. For discussion and examples, see Symphony No. 103 (Haydn).
- The tune of what is now the German national anthem was written by Haydn—paradoxically, to serve as a patriotic song for Austria. The tune is held to have its roots in an old folk song known in Medjimurje and northern regions of Croatia under the name "Stal se jesem". For details, see "Gott erhalte Franz den Kaiser".

The Croatian connection played a curious role in the revival of Haydn's critical reputation in the early 20th century, as narrated by the musicologist Bryan Proksch (2014). Kuhač was a Croatian nationalist, who believed that Joseph Haydn was of Croatian extraction (see Joseph Haydn's ethnicity). This hypothesis was ultimately demolished (1934) by research from the German scholar Ernst Fritz Schmidt, but Hadow believed it fully and convinced others as well. Like Kuhač, Hadow was a nationalist (in his case, British), who hoped to inspire a renaissance of British music founded on the nation's folk song, which at the time was being collected assiduously in fieldwork by scholars like Cecil Sharp. Hadow described Haydn as a great composer whose greatness arose in part from his knowledge and use of the folksongs of his own (putative) native Croatian heritage. Hadow intended for British composers to do the same. Remarkably, his scheme was successful, to the extent that composers now included in the classical pantheon, such as Ralph Vaughan Williams and Gustav Holst, did indeed create new compositions that evoked British forms of folk music. According to Proksch, Hadow's invocation of Haydn as a great role model had, as a side effect, a boost in the revival of Haydn's critical reputation, which at the time was at its historical nadir.

=== Differences between folk versions and Haydn's versions ===
Sometimes, a folk tune (as notated by field workers) and the version claimed to occur in Haydn's work are identical. Often, however, there is divergence, with Haydn's version being less symmetrical and musically more interesting and expressive. To give an example, the first variation theme of the second movement of the Drumroll Symphony was said by Kuhac to be taken from a song he recorded called "Na Traviknu"; the two are compared below.

"Na Traviknu"

Haydn 103 2nd mvt.

As Hadow pointed out, when Haydn borrows a folksong theme, the versions typically are closely similar at the beginning, divergent at the end (the example just given follows this pattern.) Under one view, this observation reflects Haydn's creativity as a composer; starting with the kernel of the tune occurring at the beginning, Haydn elaborated it in ways grounded in his own Classical musical language. Another possibility is given below.

=== The reverse-transmission theory ===
There is no guarantee that the direction of transmission was necessarily to, rather than from, Haydn. The alternative hypothesis is that the folk tunes collected by fieldworkers represent folklorically altered versions of tunes originally by Haydn and disseminated in altered form among the people. The musicologist Michel Brenet (pen name of Marie Bobillier) stated the hypothesis in a 1909 book:

Why should not the terms of the proposition be reversed? During the time Haydn lived at Eisenstadt or Esterháza, when his music resounded day and night in the castle and gardens of his Prince, why should not his own airs, or scraps at least of his own melodies, have stolen through the open windows and remained in the memories, first of the people whose duty it was to interpret them, and then of the scattered population of the surrounding country?

The reverse-transmission theory would offer a rather different explanation for why Haydn's versions of the tunes resemble the folk versions more at the beginning than elsewhere – it would be the beginning that would most likely be well remembered by folk singers, and the later passages that, diverging most from folk style, would be most likely to be altered.

The musicologist E. J. Dent made an observation orally at a scholarly meeting that also bears on the reverse transmission theory. He is quoted in Scott (1950), who writes:

At a Royal Musical Association discussion he said that a so-called Croatian drinking-song sounded to him much more like an opera tune by Galuppi, and added: " One can very well believe that the musical comedy tunes of Italy at that period travelled across the Adriatic and became adopted by peasants in Croatia as folk-tunes. This is quite likely, because one has only to look at any collection of Croatian or Dalmatian folk-tunes to recognize at once tunes which have come out of popular comic opera.

Also concerning the possibility of reverse transmission, it is conceivable that there is testimony from Haydn himself. In his oratorio The Seasons, the composer depicted a rural plowman whistling a tune from his own "Surprise" Symphony. There is no way of knowing at this stage whether this was meant as a little joke, or whether Haydn had actually noticed that his catchiest tunes were somehow percolating from the concert hall to the countryside.

=== Folk songs from other nationalities ===
According to a Haydn biography from 1812 written by Giuseppe Carpani, Haydn was curious not just about the folksong he knew from his own background, but also in the folksongs from other countries; Carpani wrote:

Having established his style, Haydn set about continually enriching his imagination, and not content with observing the works of his contemporaries, he early collected and treasured the best and most original songs of every nation, noting the characteristic accents, the rhythm, as well as the singular manner of each one. Ukraine, Hungary, Scotland, Germany, Sicily, Spain, Russia all contributed to Haydn's storehouse.

One possible instance of foreign folksong concerns a theme in the second movement of the Symphony No. 85, "La Reine", which was described by H. C. Robbins Landon as "a set of variations on the old French folk-song 'La gentille et jeune Lisette'". This would be an appropriate choice since the 85th Symphony is one of the "Paris" symphonies, written on commission for a Parisian audience. However, Robbins Landon's attribution is disputed: Heartz (2009:361) notes that there is no independent evidence for the existence of 'La gentille et jeune Lisette' as a folk song; Heartz suggests that the words of the putative folk song were simply made up and added to Haydn's music.

=== Scholarly response ===
Scholars differ in the degree to which they accept claims that Haydn actually had folksongs in mind when he wrote works such as those listed above. An enthusiast was H. C. Robbins Landon, who in his long book on Haydn symphonies generally accepted these claims and went further, suggesting that the cases under discussion are the tip of the iceberg, with the implication that with inspection of the earlier works of Haydn one would find a great number of further folk borrowings (Robbins Landon 1955:270). A skeptic was Karl Geiringer, who mentions multiple other possible sources for "Gott erhalte Franz den Kaiser", and describes the two themes of the second movement of the Drumroll Symphony as being merely of "folk-songlike character"; he does not even mention Kuhač's conjecture in his discussion of this movement.

Charles Rosen (in his book The Classical Style; 1971/1997, 329-350) grudgingly accepts the probable authenticity of at least some of the folk song borrowings, but focuses instead on the use that Haydn made of them. For Rosen, the tunes are not (as with Robbins Landon) the "tip of the iceberg", but are a feature of the later stages of his career. They are important in the creation (ca. 1790) of what Rosen calls Haydn's "popular style," in which the incorporation of catchy tunes gained Haydn a wide appreciation among the public, but his strategic and thoughtful use of them at crucial points in musical form gained him the admiration of professional musicians as well. Rosen writes (p. 329):

There have been composers who were much whistled and sung during their lifetimes, but none who so completely won at the same time the unquestioned and generous respect of the musical community and the ungrudging acclaim of the public.

According to Rosen, the folk and folk-like tunes are used by Haydn in three particular places. First, they tend to come near the end of the exposition section of first movements written in sonata form. Here, the composer seeks to firmly establish the dominant key, to which the music has modulated during the exposition. Rosen notes that this need for stability is satisfied in Mozart's piano concertos by a different means, the stereotyped patterns of virtuosic passages written for the soloist. Second, Haydn uses folk themes for the openings of finales; here they are suitable since the main themes of classical finales are characteristically written in four-bar phrases, matching folk music (or at least the sort of folk music invoked by Haydn). Lastly, folk themes appear in the minuet/scherzo movements, which always were a locus of popular taste in the classical symphony; Haydn's use of folk material "democratizes" the third movements, moving them away from the original aristocratic associations of the minuet.

Rosen describes the brief period in which it was possible for composers to integrate folk material so deeply into their work as a sort of golden age:

Only for one brief historical period in the operas of Mozart, the late symphonies of Haydn, and some of the Schubert songs, has the utmost sophistication and complexity of musical technique existed alongside -- or better, fused with -- the virtues of the street song.

As noted above, Rosen had little interest in the old activity of tracing the originals of Haydn's folk tunes, insisting that musically speaking, the source does matter: "The folk songs that Haydn actually used on occasion are largely indistinguishable from many of the undoubtedly original melodies of his late years." He reinforces his point by telling a joke, perhaps as a dig at the perceived sloppiness of the scholarship that gave rise to the controversy.

A relationship between Haydn's late style and folk music is evident, but the nature of that relationship is questionable and even slippery. There is a story, surely apocryphal but worth telling in this context, about the professor who went to do field research on Haydn among the peasants of that ethnically indecisive region of the Austro-Hungarian Empire where Haydn spent part of his childhood. The professor's method of investigation was to sing some of the better tunes of Haydn to the peasants, and ask if they recognized them. The peasants, with an earthy shrewdness even older and more traditional than folk music, quickly discovered that they were given a bigger tip when they recognized a melody than when they failed to do so, and their memories accordingly became richly accommodating. And to this day, the story ends, the peasants of that little Danubian region sing the songs that the professor taught them.

== Haydn's role in adapting folk music to domestic use ==
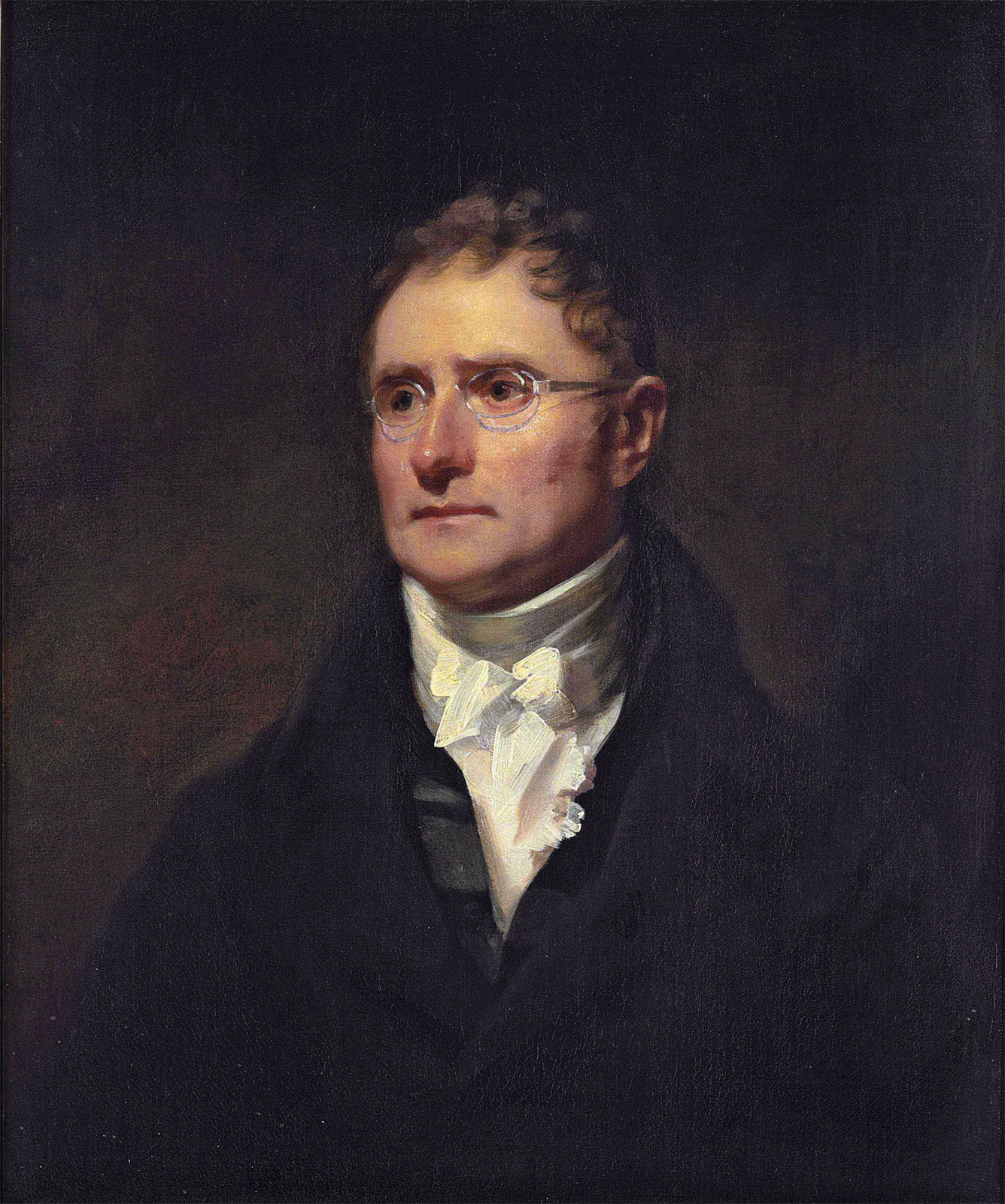
George Thomson by Henry Raeburn

Uncontroversially, Haydn knew a great number of folksongs from the British Isles, in particular Scotland and Wales. This was the result of a series of substantial commissions from British publishers to provide accompaniments for these songs (the same task was taken up by other composers as well, including Koželuch, Beethoven and Weber.) He began with a set of one hundred, done as a favor to save the publisher William Napier from bankruptcy. A greater number of settings were done, at a fee of two ducats each, for the publisher George Thomson, who was himself an early fieldworker in the area of folksong, collecting tunes from Scotland, Wales, and Ireland. Still further settings were prepared for the publisher William Whyte. All of these settings were prepared for the combination of high voice (tenor/soprano), piano, violin, and cello. In the end there were more than 400 of them, though in his old age, his health ruined, Haydn asked his devoted student Sigismund Neukomm to set a number of the songs he had been assigned.

Rosemary Hughes (1950:123) writes of these song settings:

The scientific study of folk melody and its appropriate harmonization was a thing of the future, and for all his enjoyment of these songs, it never occurred to him to adapt his musical idiom to theirs. His settings ... thus give them an alien charm--though the Celtic beauties are often very attractive in their period costume.

== Notes ==
=== Sources ===
- Brenet, Michel (1909). Haydn. Paris.
- Griesinger, Georg August (1968) [1810]. Biographical Notes Concerning Joseph Haydn. Translated by Vernon Gotwals. Madison: University of Milwaukee Press.
- Heartz, Daniel (2009) Mozart, Haydn, and Early Beethoven. New York: Norton
- Hughes, Rosemary (1950). Haydn. New York: Farrar Straus and Giroux.
- Pegg, Carole (2001) Folk music. New Grove Dictionary of Music and Musicians, version in "Oxford Music Online".
- Robbins Landon, H. C. (1963). Joseph Haydn: Critical Edition of the Complete Symphonies. Vienna: Universal Edition.
- Schroeder, David (2009). "Folk music". In David Wyn Jones (ed.). Oxford Composer Companions: Haydn. Oxford: Oxford University Press.
- Scott, Marion M. (April 1950). "Haydn and Folk-Song". Music & Letters. 31 (2): 119–124. doi:10.1093/ml/XXXI.2.119. JSTOR 729111.
- Webster, James (2001). "Joseph Haydn". New Grove.
