= Oj, Jelena, Jelena, jabuka zelena =

Croatian folk song

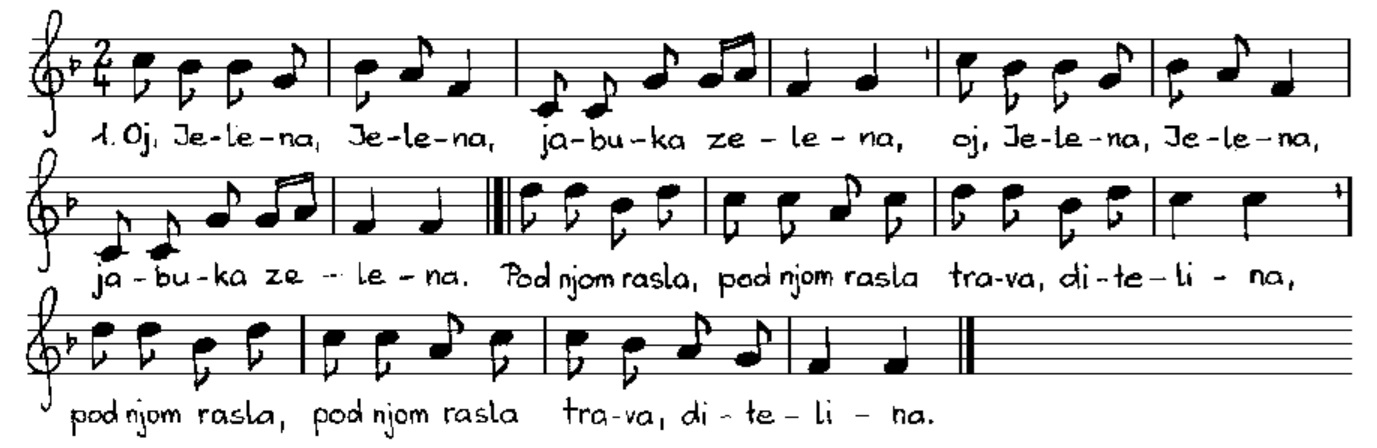
The song with its lyrics; click to enlarge.

"Oj, Jelena, Jelena, jabuka zelena" is a Croatian folk song. In English, the title means "Oh, Helen, Helen, green apple of mine".

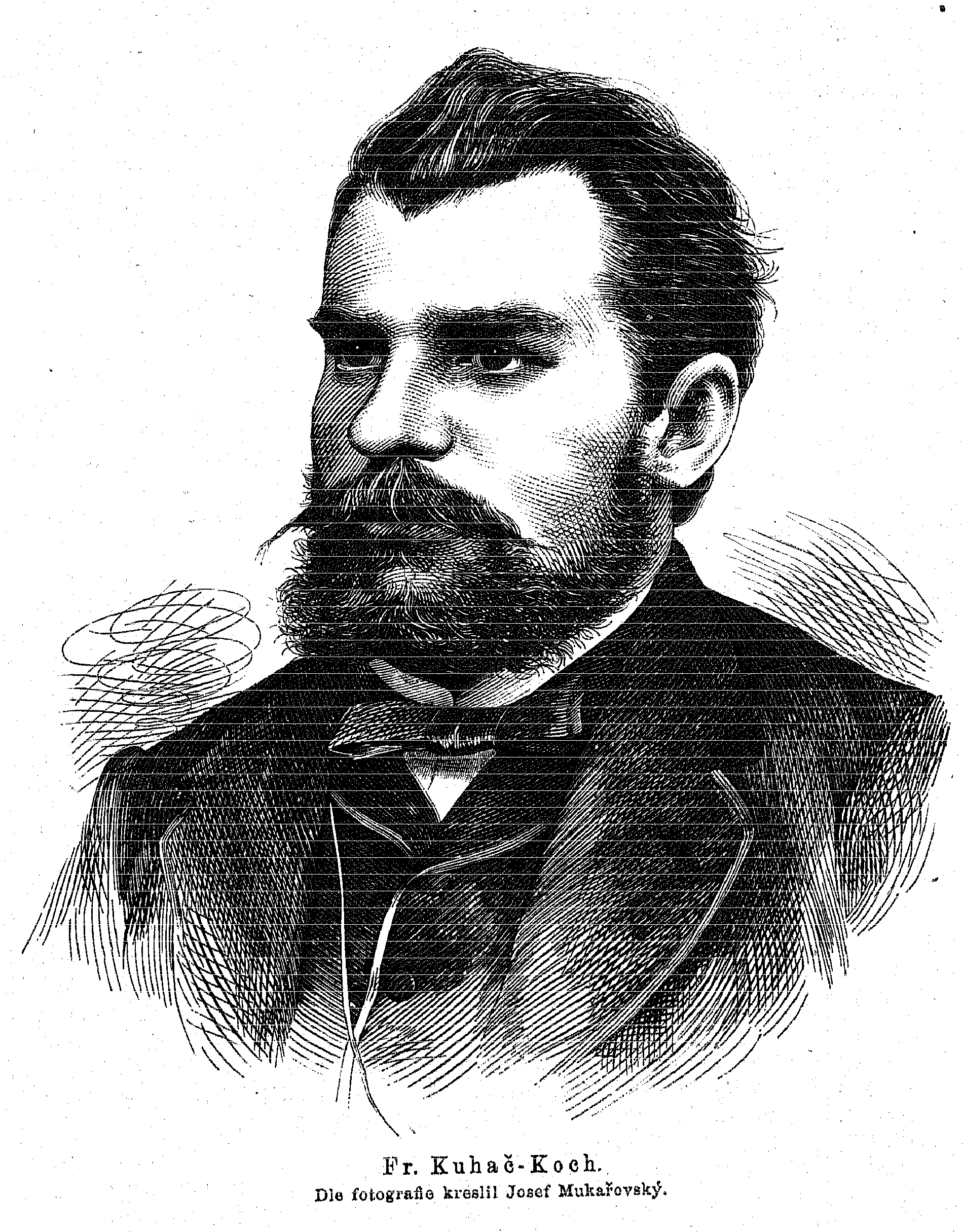
Franjo Kuhač (1874)

The ethnologist Franjo Kuhač (1834-1911), who gathered a great number of Croatian tunes in fieldwork, noticed a resemblance between this song and the main theme of the finale of Joseph Haydn's "London" symphony (No. 104 in D major), and suggested that Haydn knew the song and made it the basis of his symphonic movement. He published this claim (and similar claims about other Haydn works) in his book Josip Haydn i hrvatske narodne popievke (Zagreb, 1880). The English musicologist William Henry Hadow (1859-1937) became an enthusiast for Kuhač's views and promulgated them in his own English-language book (Hadow 1897), and the resemblance is now commonly noted in program notes on the symphony. The folk song and the symphony are compared below.

Folksong:

Symphony:

For general discussion of the appearance of Croatian folk songs in Haydn's music, see Haydn and folk music.
