= London Symphony =

London Symphony may refer to:

- London Symphony Orchestra
- A London Symphony, the 2nd symphony by Ralph Vaughan Williams, so named by him
- Symphony No. 104 (Haydn) by Joseph Haydn, an informal nickname
- London symphonies, a collective title for all twelve of Haydn's last symphonies, i.e. Nos. 93 to 104
