= Manfred Schmidt =

Manfred Schmid(t) may refer to:

- Manfred Schmid (born 1944), Austrian luger
- Manfred Schmid (footballer) (born 1971), Austrian football coach
- Manfred Hermann Schmid (1947–2021), German musicologist
- Manfred G. Schmidt (born 1948), German professor of political science
- Manni Schmidt (born 1964), German guitarist
