= Symphony No. 103 (Haydn) =

Musical work by Joseph Haydn, composed in 1794-1795

- Drumroll
- by Joseph Haydn
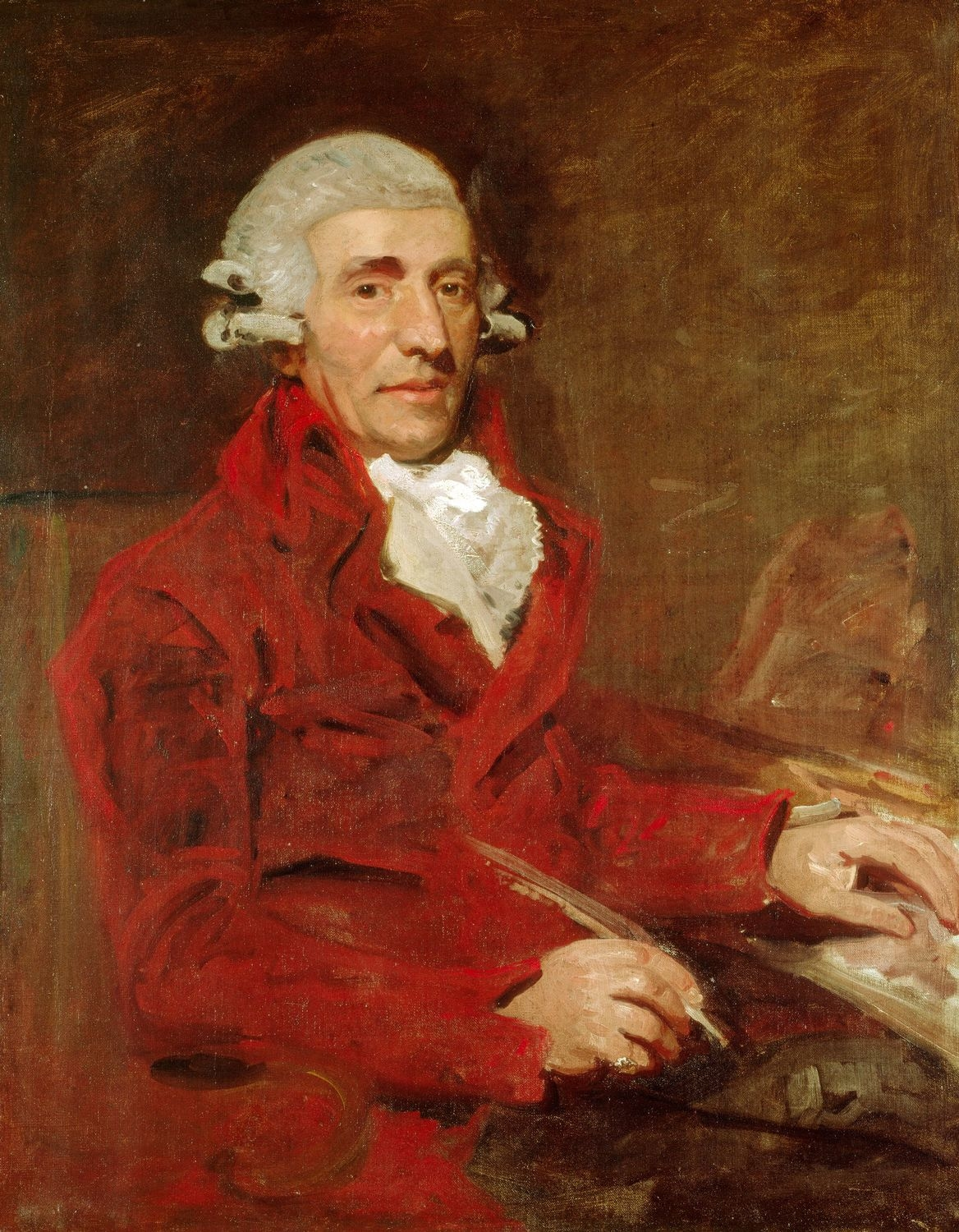
- Haydn in around 1792
- Key: E♭ major
- Catalogue: Hob. I:103
- Composed: 1795
- Duration: c. 30 minutes
- Movements: 4
- Scoring: Orchestra

Premiere
- Date: 2 March 1795
- Location: King's Theatre, London
- Conductor: Joseph Haydn

The Symphony No. 103 in E♭ major, Hob. I:103, was composed in 1795 by Joseph Haydn. It is the eleventh of his twelve London symphonies and the second-to-last that he composed.

The symphony takes about 30 minutes to perform.

== Nickname ==
"Drumroll" is not Haydn's own, like with most of his symphonies with nicknames. It comes from the long roll on the timpani with which the symphony opens.

== History ==
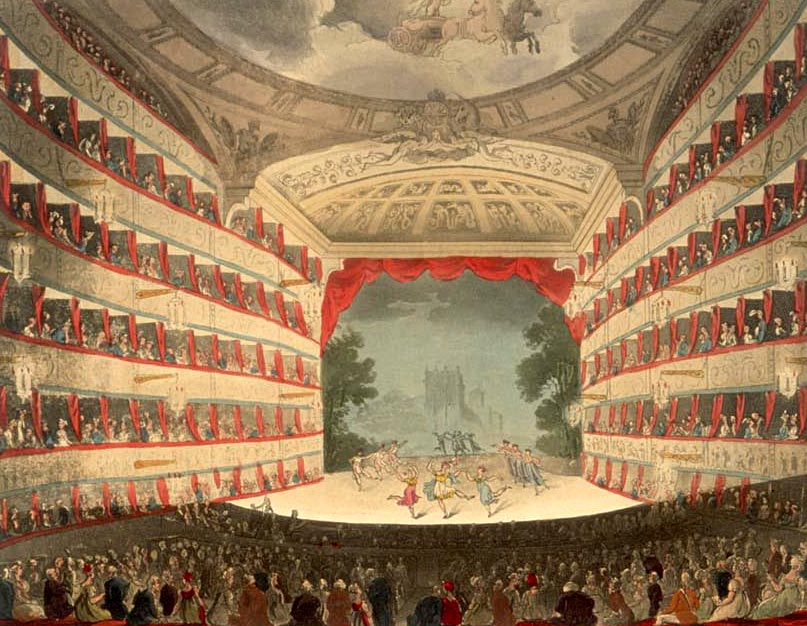
The King's Theatre in London, where the Drumroll Symphony was premiered. The image dates from 1808.

The symphony was the eleventh of twelve that were composed for performance in England during Haydn's two journeys there (1791–1792, 1794–1795), arranged and organized by the impresario Johann Peter Salomon. Haydn's music was well known in England well before the composer traveled there, and members of the British musical public had long expressed the wish that Haydn would visit. The composer's reception in England was in fact very enthusiastic, and the English visits were one of the most fruitful and happy periods of the composer's life. Haydn composed the Drumroll Symphony while living in London during the winter of 1794–1795.

=== Premiere ===
The symphony was premiered on March 2, 1795 as part of a concert series called the "Opera Concerts" at the King's Theatre. The orchestra was unusually large for the time, consisting of about 60 players. The task of directing the work was divided between the concertmaster, the violinist Giovanni Battista Viotti, and Haydn, who sat at the fortepiano. The premiere was evidently a success, and The Morning Chronicle's reviewer wrote:

Another new Overture [i.e., symphony], by the fertile and enchanting Haydn, was performed; which, as usual, had continual strokes of genius, both in air and harmony. The Introduction excited deepest attention, the Allegro charmed, the Andante was encored, the Minuets, especially the trio, were playful and sweet, and the last movement was equal, if not superior to the preceding.

The Sun wrote:

HAYDN's new Overture was much applauded. It is a fine mixture of grandeur and fancy... the second movement was encored.

Haydn later performed the work in Vienna, and for this purpose made a small cut in the final movement, which is usually respected by conductors today.

=== Publication and autograph ms. ===
According to Robbins Landon (1954:52), the first publication of the work was carried out by the London firm of Monzani & Cimador under the supervision of Johann Peter Salomon. In the years that followed, the work was published by multiple firms: Imbault, Pleyel, Sieber, Andre, Hummel, Simrock, Breitkopf & Härtel, and Artaria. Robbins Landon notes: "We have no evidence at all, textual or otherwise, that Haydn had anything to do with [any of these editions]."

Haydn retained the autograph manuscript himself. In 1806, toward the end of his life, he made a gift of the manuscript to the admiring younger composer Luigi Cherubini, who was visiting him at his home in Mariahilf, near Vienna. The manuscript eventually made its way to the collections of the British Library. Robbins Landon suggests that accurate modern editions should rely primarily on the composer's autograph manuscript and not the published versions.

=== Reception ===
Since its premiere, the Drumroll Symphony has been a favorite among Haydn's symphonies, performed even during the long drought of esteem Haydn's work suffered during the 19th century. In 1831, Richard Wagner arranged the work for piano. The work is frequently performed and recorded today.

== Music ==
The symphony is scored for two flutes, two oboes, two clarinets, two bassoons, two horns, two trumpets, timpani, and strings.

It is in standard four-movement form:

1. Adagio – Allegro con spirito, 3/4 then 6/8
2. Andante più tosto allegretto, 2/4 in C minor/major
3. Menuetto, 3/4
4. Finale: Allegro con spirito,

=== I. Adagio – Allegro con spirito ===
After the opening drum roll, the bass instruments play a somber opening theme:

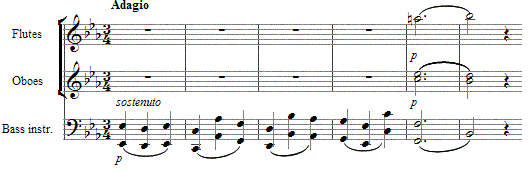

As commentators have pointed out, the first four notes of which match the Dies Irae chant, part of the Latin mass for the dead:

H. C. Robbins Landon has remarked that at the start the theme is ambiguous between duple and triple time and between the keys of C minor and (what ultimately proves the case) E♭ major.

The sprightly Allegro con spirito that follows this introduction is in sonata form and 6/8 time, beginning with this theme:

In a number of places, it restates the theme of the introduction in much faster tempo. Richard Wigmore describes these appearances:

Haydn proceeds to integrate the introduction systematically into the 6/8 Allegro con spirito. A fragment of the Dies Irae theme flits by, speeded up and transmuted into a blithe dance, just before the Ländler-ish second subject. At the heart of the development, after a grand pause, it makes a more theatrical appearance in its original deep bass register, like a spectre at a feast.

Here are the passages to which he refers:

"transmuted fragment":

Ländler-ish second subject":

Yet another quotation of the introduction appears in the coda section. Wigmore writes, "Near the end of the movement, a series of seismic orchestral shocks heralds another dramatic pause and a return of the lugubrious introduction, complete with drumroll, in its original Adagio tempo." The formal procedure of quoting the slow introduction in the coda section had been previously employed by Mozart in his String Quintet K. 593 (1790). When the latter work was new, Haydn learned about it by playing it, along with Mozart and other friends, at a social gathering in Vienna in December 1790. The same procedure was soon to be adopted by Haydn's former pupil Beethoven, who quoted the slow introduction in the coda of the opening movement of his Pathétique piano sonata, published four years after the Drumroll Symphony in 1799.

=== II. Andante più tosto allegretto ===
In double variation form, with alternating themes in C minor and C major.

First, minor theme:

Second, major theme:

The pattern of the movement is: (a) minor theme, (b) major theme, (c) first variation on the minor theme (woodwinds), (d) first variation on the major theme (for violin solo), (e) second variation on the minor theme (trumpets and drums), (f) second variation on the major theme (ditto), (g) a long coda section, based on the major theme.

The double variations had been a favorite musical form of the composer for about 20 years. Along with the Piano Trio, Hob. XV:23 from the same year, this was the last set he wrote.

=== III. Menuetto ===
The minuet is in the home key of E♭ major. James Keller describes the movement thus: "minor-key shadows flicker across a landscape filled with yodeling." Charles Rosen, in The Classical Style, chose this minuet to illustrate the point that Classical-era minuets often have very strong first beats, in contrast to the more flowing rhythm of the Baroque minuet.

=== IV. Finale: Allegro con spirito ===
The finale is in fast tempo, has a monothematic exposition, and is in sonata rondo form. Like the first movement, it begins with a quasi-ritual gesture – in this case, a horn call:

Notated at concert pitch, this is:

The horn call is followed by a pause, then repeated as accompaniment to the main theme, and indeed echoed throughout the movement. The main theme is as follows:

Rather unusually for Haydn, he altered the fourth movement after it was completed, removing 13 bars fairly close to the end. The original autograph score preserves this music; it modulates to the key of B major and includes a two-measure rest; with the dynamic markings p and pp. Robbins Landon suggests that Haydn removed the passage because it "would hold up the course of the movement." The symphony is occasionally performed with the deleted passage included; e.g. in recorded versions by Antal Doráti and Frans Brüggen.

== Critical notes ==
Graham Abbott addresses the question of how the opening timpani solo should be performed:

This bar is traditionally performed as a simple roll on the note E flat, starting loudly and getting softer. However, Haydn's score contains the word "Intrada" next to this timpani bar, suggesting that some sort of improvised drum introduction is required, and not just a single roll. In recent years - with period instrument orchestras and a greater focus on historically informed performance practice - it has become more common to hear the timpani perform some sort of introductory cadenza at the start.

Charles Rosen (1997:333-337), in his book The Classical Style, invokes the so-called "second subject" of the first movement as an illustration of how the mature Haydn integrated simple, folk-like tunes into his works in sonata form. Typically, these appear at the end of the exposition section, where they serve as a source of stability, anchoring in place the accomplished movement of the exposition from the home key to the dominant. Rosen suggest that this is the same function served by virtuoso passagework in the Classical concerto. The theme to which Rosen refers is one already quoted above and repeated here for convenience:

The finale has attracted particular admiration from critics, in building a large and compelling movement from very small ingredients, particularly the opening horn call and the first four notes of the main theme. Herbert Glass writes:

The Finale is a marvel of energy and concision, its main theme an example (the most famous of which, although clearly not the first, is the opening of Beethoven's Fifth Symphony) of what a composer of genius can accomplish with only four notes. Haydn, however, delays his main theme with a startling horn call, which then engages in a contrapuntal tussle with the main theme. That four-note motif is subsequently heard in numerous guises until it is ultimately combined with the horn call - now stated by all the brass and woodwinds - in a riotously brilliant, galloping conclusion.

Robbins Landon notes that this finale is one of the longest in the London Symphonies. He calls it "one of the great tours-de-force, formally speaking, of Haydn's career: the creation of a long movement on a single theme in which our interest never flags; on the contrary, it is a Finale of unusual tension and strength."

=== The folksongs ===
The Croatian ethnomusicologist Franjo Kuhač did extensive fieldwork on the folksongs of the Croatians, and in his publications made the case that Haydn knew many of these songs and adapted them for use in his compositions. The Drumroll Symphony is a notable instance.

Haydn never set foot in Croatia, but lived in a part of Austria that was dotted with Croatian-speaking areas, the result of migration in previous centuries. The language is still spoken in a few Austrian villages even today, mainly by some Burgenland Croats.

Kuhač's hypothesis was accepted by Anglophone scholars, notably by William Henry Hadow, who promulgated it with enthusiasm in his own work, and later on by Robbins Landon. The latter conjectures that Haydn's folk song borrowings were actually very extensive, but it is only in the later symphonies that the identification of Haydn themes with collected folk material has primarily been made. For general discussion see Haydn and folk music.

The putative folk themes of the Drumroll Symphony are as follows: (1) the opening theme of the first movement; (2) both themes of the double-variation slow movement; (3) the opening theme of the finale.

The folk original of the opening theme is not currently available; all that is known is that Kuhac listed Haydn's theme in a sequence of citations for which he claims a folk original exists.

The folksong basis of the first theme of the slow movement is (perhaps) a song recorded by Kuhac called "Na Traviknu". Haydn's theme is repeated below for comparison.

"Na Traviknu"

Haydn 103 2nd mvt.

The major-key theme of the second movement is held to be drawn from a folk song called "Jur Postaje"; the folk material is juxtaposed with Haydn's music below.

"Jur Postaje"

Haydn 103 2nd mvt.

Rosen (1997:331) discusses this material as part of a more general discussion of how Haydn used folk music in his compositions. As he noted, Haydn rendered the folksong note as F sharp; i.e. Haydn's work, but not the original, uses the Lydian mode characteristic of folk music. Rosen suggests, "The F# ... strengthens the popular character of the theme, which, in its original form, was evidently not folk-like enough for Haydn."

The main theme of the finale was claimed by Kuhač to be taken from a tune called "Divojčica potok gazi" ("A little girl treads on a brook").

"Divojčica potok gazi"

Haydn, Symphony 103

== See also ==
- List of symphonies by name
