= Sonata rondo form =

Classical music form

Sonata rondo form is a musical form often used during the Classical and Romantic music eras. As the name implies, it is a blend of sonata and rondo forms.

== Structure ==
=== Sonata and rondo forms ===
Rondo form involves the repeated use of a theme (sometimes called the "refrain") set in the tonic key, alternating with episodes, resulting in forms such as ABACA (the five-part rondo) or ABACADA (the seven-part rondo). In a rondo, the refrain (A) may be varied slightly. The episodes (B, C, D, etc.) are normally in a different key than the tonic.

Sonata form is a classical form composed of three main sections, namely exposition, development, and recapitulation. A sonata may begin with an introduction, which is commonly slower than the remainder of the movement. After that, there is an exposition, whose purpose is to present the movement's main thematic material. This takes the form of one or two themes or theme groups, the second of which is commonly in a related key. The exposition may conclude with a short codetta or closing theme and may be repeated. This is followed by the development section, in which existing thematic material may be presented in new harmonic and textural contexts or entirely new material may be introduced. Next comes the recapitulation, where all themes or theme groups from the exposition are presented again but now in the tonic key. Sonatas may optionally end with a final large section called the coda.

The following shows the structure of sonata form. In the notation, a single prime (') means "in the dominant" and a double prime (") means "in remote keys".

[A B']_{exp} [C"]_{dev} [A B]_{recap}

Occasionally, sonata form includes an "episodic development," which uses mostly new thematic material. Two examples are the first movements of Mozart's Piano Sonata K. 330 and Beethoven's Piano Sonata Op. 14, no. 1. The episodic development is often the kind of development that is used in sonata rondo form, to which we now turn.

=== Sonata rondo form ===
Sonata rondo form combines features of the five-part rondo and sonata form. The simplest kind of sonata rondo form is a sonata form that repeats the opening material in the tonic at the end of the exposition and recapitulation sections.

[A B' A]_{exp} [C"]_{dev} [A B A]_{recap}

By adding in these extra appearances of A, the form reads off as AB'AC"ABA, hence the alternation of A with "other" material that characterizes the rondo. Note that if the development is an episodic development, then C" will be new thematic material—thus increasing the resemblance of sonata rondo form to an actual rondo.

==== "Six-part" variants ====
Mozart sometimes used a variant type of sonata rondo form in which the first "A" section of the recapitulation is omitted. Thus:

[A B' A]_{exp} [C"]_{dev} [B A]_{recap}

Mozart's purpose was perhaps to create a sense of variety by not having the main theme return at such regular intervals. He used the form in the finales of his piano quartets and a number of his piano concertos.

Another six-part sonata rondo form may be written as:

[A B' A]_{exp} [C"]_{dev} [A B]_{recap}

This instance occurs in the fourth movement of Tchaikovsky's Symphony No. 6 in B minor.

== Codas ==
Often, regular sonata form includes a coda:

[A B']_{exp} [C"]_{dev} [A B]_{recap} [D]_{coda}

This longer version of sonata form has a counterpart in sonata rondo form.

[A B' A]_{exp} [C"]_{dev} [A B A]_{recap} [D]_{coda}

Thus: AB'AC"ABAD. An example is the last movement of Beethoven's "Pathetique" Sonata Op. 13.

== Sonata rondo form as a variant of rondo form ==
It is also possible to describe sonata rondo form by starting out with rondo form and describing how it is transformed to be more like sonata form. For this explanation, see rondo.

In Mozart and His Piano Concertos, Cuthbert Girdlestone conjectured that the sonata rondo form derives also in part from the dances en rondeau of Jean-Philippe Rameau, among others, by structural elaboration, possibly an innovation of Mozart's.

== Uses of the sonata rondo form ==
Sonata rondo form is almost exclusively used in the finales of multi-movement works. It is considered a somewhat relaxed and discursive form. Thus, it is unsuited to an opening movement (typically the musically tightest and most intellectually rigorous movement in a Classical work). It is, exceptionally, used in the opening Andante movement of Haydn's Piano Sonata Hob. XVI:51. Here are some movements written in sonata rondo form:

- Wolfgang Amadeus Mozart
  - Piano Sonata No. 13, K. 333 (1783), last movement
  - Piano Concerto No. 20, K. 466 (1785), last movement
  - Piano Concerto No. 23, K. 488 (1786), last movement
  - Divertimento for String Trio, K. 563, last movement
- Joseph Haydn
  - Symphony No. 85 "La Reine", Hoboken 1/85 (1785), last movement
  - Symphony No. 103 "Drumroll", Hoboken 1/103 (1795), last movement
- Joseph Bologne
  - Sonata for Flute and Harp in E♭ major, last movement
- Ludwig van Beethoven
  - Two violin and piano sonatas, Op. 12 (1798), last movements
  - Piano Sonata No. 8 "Pathetique", Op. 13 (1798), last movement
  - Piano Sonata No. 13 "Quasi una fantasia", Op. 27, No. 1 (1800–1801), last movement
  - Piano Sonata No. 27, Op. 90, last movement
  - Violin Concerto, Op. 61 (1806), last movement
  - Symphony No. 4, Op. 60 (1806), second movement
  - Symphony No. 6 "Pastoral", Op. 68 (1808), last movement
  - Symphony No. 8, Op. 93 (1812), last movement
- Franz Schubert
  - String Quartet No. 14 "Death and the Maiden", D. 810 (1824), last movement
  - Piano Sonata No. 21, D. 960 (1828), last movement
- Felix Mendelssohn
  - Violin Concerto, Op. 64 (1844), last movement
- Johannes Brahms
  - Piano Concerto No. 2, Op. 83 (1881), fourth (last) movement
  - Violin Sonata No. 3, Op. 108 (1886–1888), fourth (last) movement

== See also ==
- ABACABA pattern
