= Rivista Musicale Italiana =

- Discipline: Musicology
- Language: Italian

Publication details
- History: 1894–1932; 1936–1943; 1946–1955
- Publisher: Giuseppe Bocca (Italy)
- Frequency: Quarterly

Standard abbreviations
- ISO 4: Riv. Music. Ital.

Links
- Journal homepage

Rivista Musicale Italiana (The Italian Music Magazine) (also referred to as RMI) was a quarterly periodical of musicological subject published by Giuseppe Bocca. The periodical began publishing in Turin in 1894 until 1933 when it was suspended. The publications resumed in 1936 in Milan where, except for the interruption from 1943 to 1945, it was published until 1953, and from 1954 to 1955 in Rome.

== History and contents of the magazine ==
After numerous failures of magazines of the kind in Italy, that occurred in the nineteenth century, RMI had gathered as collaborators first-rate young Italian musicologists and historians, succeeding in giving continuity to the publications for many years.

The editors of RMI promoted studies based on the new historical methodology, namely, the philological analysis of documents. As a result, the magazine devoted special attention in selecting contributions based on primary source materials. Furthermore, attracts the collaboration of qualified foreign scholars, especially from (Germany) and France.

== Contributors ==
Among the contributors of the first period there were: Giovanni Tebaldini, Alberto Gentili, Luigi Torchi, Salomon Jadassohn, Arthur Pougin, Guido Adler, Julien Tiersot, Nicola D'Arienzo, Marie Bobillier, Jules Combarieu, Adolf Sandberger, Carlo Perinello, Jacques-Gabriel Prod’homme.

From 1946 to 1955 essays were published by, among others, Robert-Aloys Mooser, Sebastiano Luciani, Benvenuto Disertori, Nino Pirrotta, Remo Giazotto, Claudio Sartori, Guglielmo Barblan, Luciano Tomelleri.
