= Wilhelm Schmid (scholar) =

German classical scholar

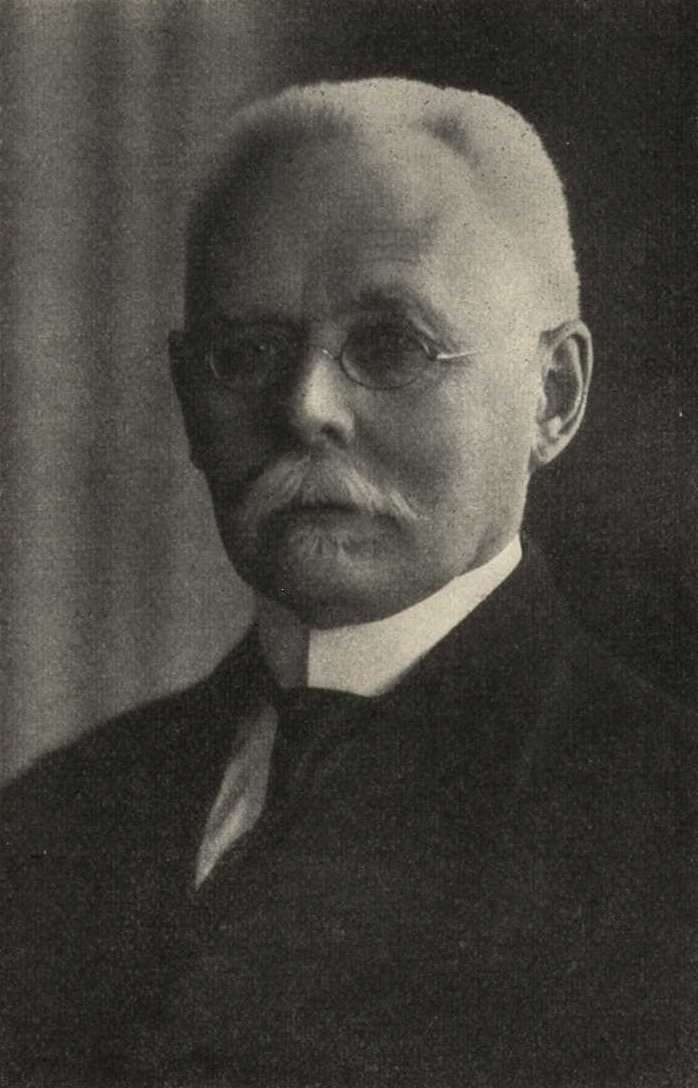
Wilhelm Schmid

Wilhelm Schmid (24 February 1859, in Künzelsau, Kingdom of Württemberg – 6 November 1951) was a German classical scholar.

After studying at the universities of Tübingen and Strassburg, Schmid began teaching at Tübingen in 1887 and was appointed professor in 1893. His publications include:

- Kulturgeschichtliche Zusammenhang und Bedeutung der griechischen Renaissance in der Römerzeit (1898) – On the cultural and historical context, and the importance of the Greek Renaissance in the Roman period.
- Zur Geschichte des griechischen Dithyrambus (1901) – The history of the Greek dithyramb.
- Verzeichniss der griechischen Handschriften der Königlichen Universitäts-Bibliothek Tübingen (1902) – Directory of Greek manuscripts of the Royal University Library in Tübingen.
- Revisions of Wilhelm von Christ; Geschichte der griechischen Litteratur (volume i, fifth edition, Munich, 1908; sixth edition, part i, 1912; volume ii, fifth edition, Munich, 1911–1915).

His son was the musicologist and Mozart scholar, Ernst Fritz Schmid.
