= Piano Sonata No. 9 (Beethoven) =

Piano sonata written by Beethoven

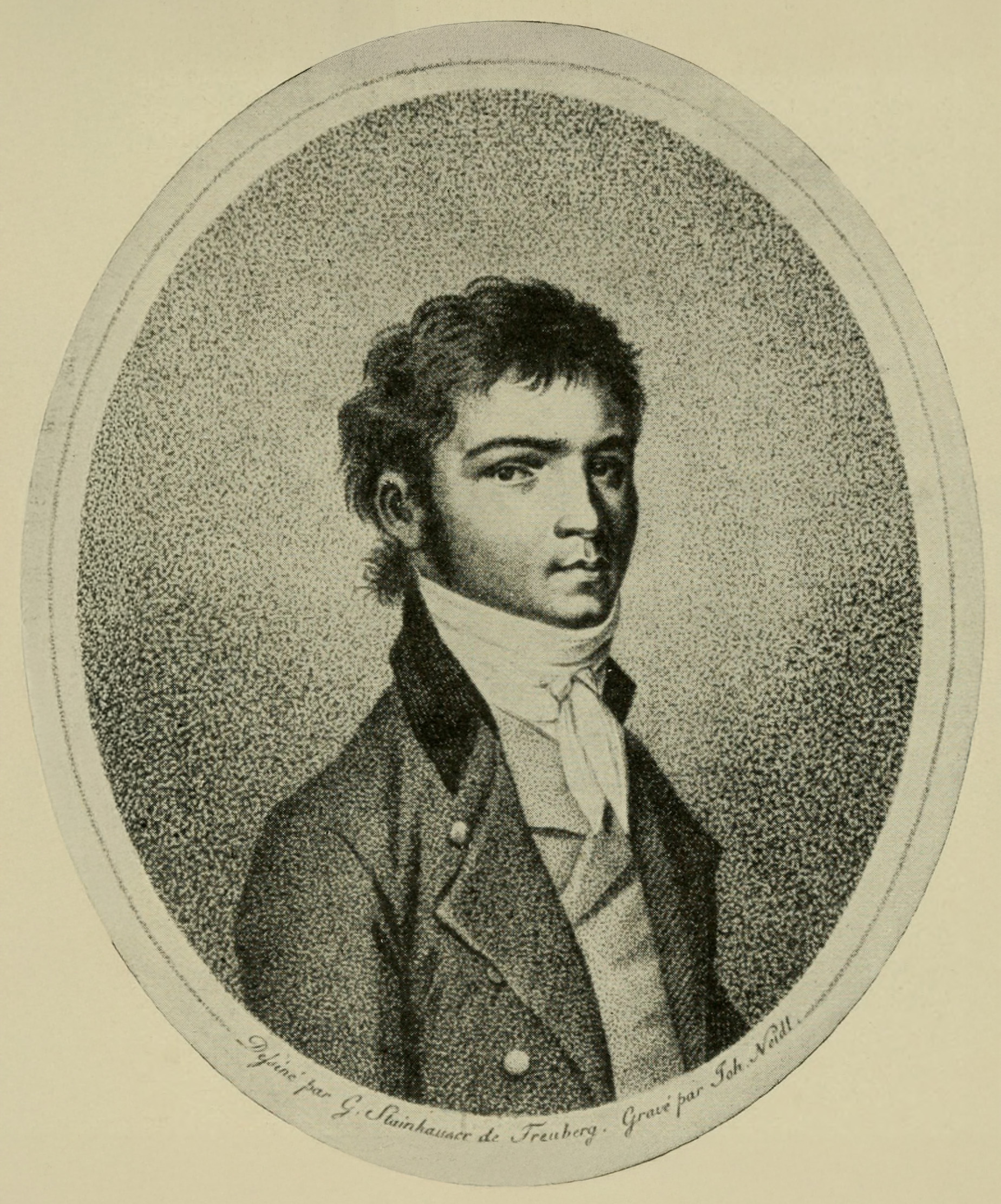
Portrait of Ludwig van Beethoven, aged 29

The Piano Sonata No. 9 in E major, Op. 14, No. 1, is an early-period work by Ludwig van Beethoven, dedicated to Baroness Josefa von Braun, one of his patrons at that time. It was composed in 1798 and arranged for string quartet by the composer in 1801 (Hess 34), the result containing more quartet-like passagework and in the more comfortable key of F major.

== Music ==
I. Allegro

II. Allegretto

III. Rondo – Allegro comodo
Played by Artur Schnabel in 1932

The sonata is in three movements:

1. Allegro, in E major
2. Allegretto, in E minor with a trio in C major (which returns in the coda)
3. Rondo – Allegro comodo, in E major

=== I. Allegro ===
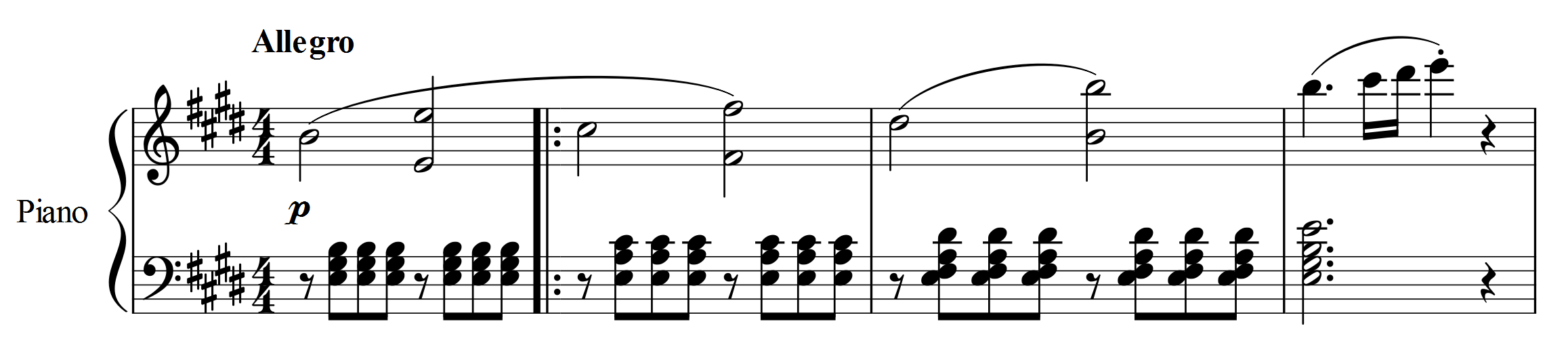

The first movement opens with a series of ascending fourths in the right hand, followed by a quartet-like echoing of a phrase in different octaves. The second theme, in B major, is based on a descending run followed by an ascending chromatic run. The development is full of sixteenth-note arpeggios in the left hand, and sixteenth-note left-hand scales accompany the start of the recapitulation, but the movement ends quietly.

This movement also features a high F♯_{6} in measure 41, which was out of the typical range of the piano at the time, which went from F_{1} to F_{6}. It's possible Beethoven had intentionally wrote it like this anticipating that although the note wasn't playable at the time, it would become playable in the (near) future.

=== II. Allegretto ===
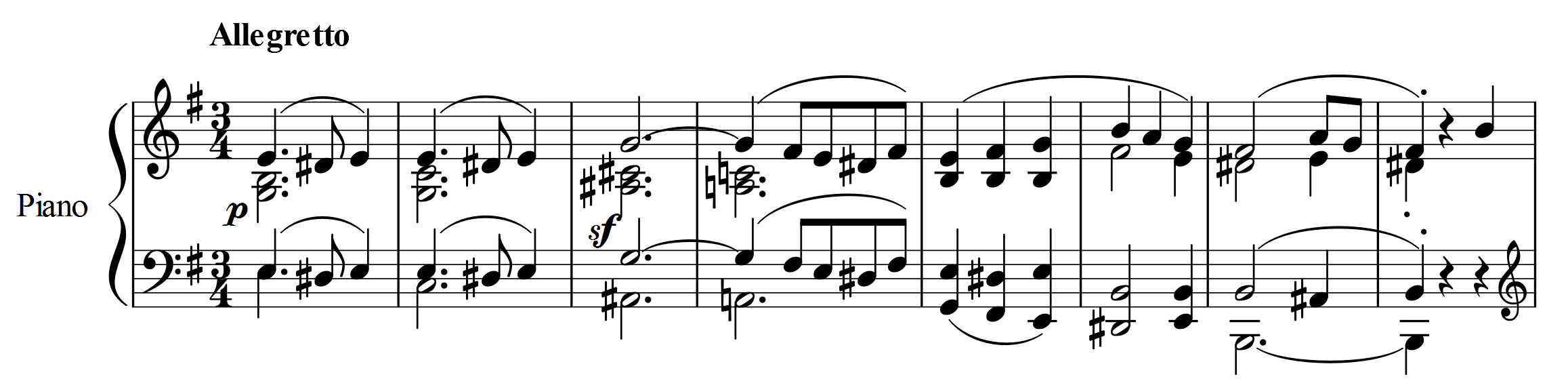

The second movement is minuet-like; the main section ends on the tonic major chord. The first time, this leads without intermediate modulation to the trio, headed Maggiore, in C; after its return, the coda briefly quotes the C major tune before returning to E minor. Anton Schindler recalled that Beethoven would play the E-minor section furiously, before pausing at length on the E-major chord and giving a calmer account of the Maggiore.

=== III. Rondo – Allegro comodo ===
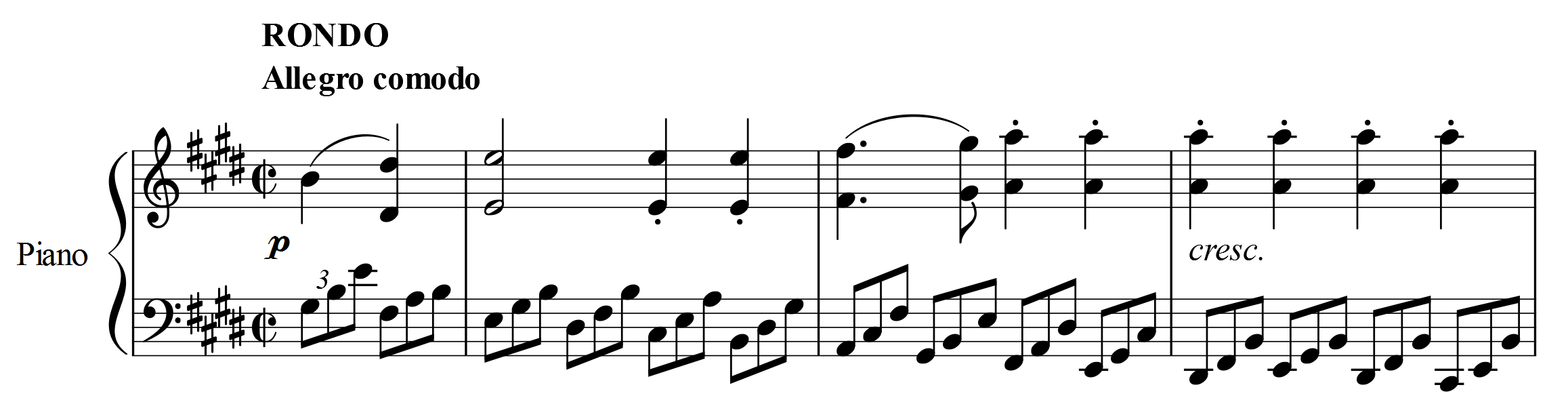

The third movement is in a lively sonata rondo form. On its final return, the main theme is syncopated against triplets.

Not withstanding its seeming simplicity, this sonata introduces the "Sturm und Drang" character that became so commonly identified with Beethoven. He adds drama both in the contrast between the lyrical passages that follow very active, textured thematic sections. Furthermore, the contrasting dynamics and variation between major and minor, between using the parallel minor and the subdominant of its relative major (E minor to C major). These were new techniques that offer a hint of the innovations that Beethoven brought to end the Classical era and begin the Romantic era.

== Critical reception ==
The pianist and musicologist Charles Rosen considers both of the Opus 14 sonatas to be "considerably more modest than their predecessors", "destined for use in the home" and with "few technical difficulties". However, in contrast, pianist András Schiff disagrees with the notion that "the Opus 14 sonatas are lighter or easier" and in his lecture on Opus 14 No. 1 (see below), he states that they are frightfully difficult to play and to interpret.

== Version for string quartet ==
According to Donald Francis Tovey, the instrumentation of this sonata for string quartet is “one of the most interesting documents in the history of Beethoven’s art… There is hardly a bar of the quartet-version that does not shed some light on the nature of the pianoforte, of quartet-writing and of the general structure of music… he takes one of his smallest sonatas and shows [...] that hardly a bar of pianoforte music can be turned into good quartet-writing without quantities of new material besides drastic transformation of the old.” Tovey singles out the opening of the Allegretto second movement as an example not only of what Beethoven adds, but also of what he leaves out in re-imagining the piano sound for strings:

Beethoven, Sonata, Op. 14 No. 1, 2nd movement, bars 1-8, Quartet version

Beethoven, Op. 14 No. 1, 2nd movement, bars 1–8, Quartet version

“Beethoven shows his profoundest insight in not allowing the four stringed instruments to reproduce the thick pianoforte chords, though this would be possible with quite easy double stops.”

== String Quartet in F major ==
String Quartet in F major is an arrangement for string quartet of the Piano Sonata No. 9. The original key of E major was changed to F major in the process, which was done by the composer.

== References and sources ==
=== Sources ===
- Behrend, William (1927). Ludwig Van Beethoven's Pianoforte Sonatas (translated by Ingeborg Lund). London: J. M. Dent & Sons.
- Rosen, Charles (2002). Beethoven's Piano Sonatas: A Short Companion, Volume 1. Yale University Press. ISBN 0300090706.
