= Carlo Perinello =

Carlo Perinello (13 February 1877 – 6 January 1942) was an Italian academic, composer and musicologist.

== Life ==
He was born in Trieste; he studied music there and in Florence, Vienna and Leipzig, where he studied composition with Salomon Jadassohn at Leipzig Conservatory. From 1904 to 1914 he taught composition and music history at Trieste Conservatory.

He moved to Milan in 1914, where he was head of the music department of the publisher Istituto editoriale italiano, and from 1917 to 1919 he taught harmony at Milan Conservatory.

Perinello retired to Abbazia and later moved to Rome; he devoted himself to composition, and studied Italian composers of the 16th to 18th centuries. He died in Rome in 1942.

== Works ==
Compositions include chamber music, piano works, symphonic works and an opera Rosamunde.

In 1900 Perinello published in Berlin the first German-language biography of Giuseppe Verdi; Armonia razionale (2 volumes} was published 1933–36; he also contributed to the magazine Rivista Musicale Italiana.
