= Symphony No. 85 (Haydn) =

Symphony in four movements by Joseph Haydn

- The Queen or La Reine
- by Joseph Haydn
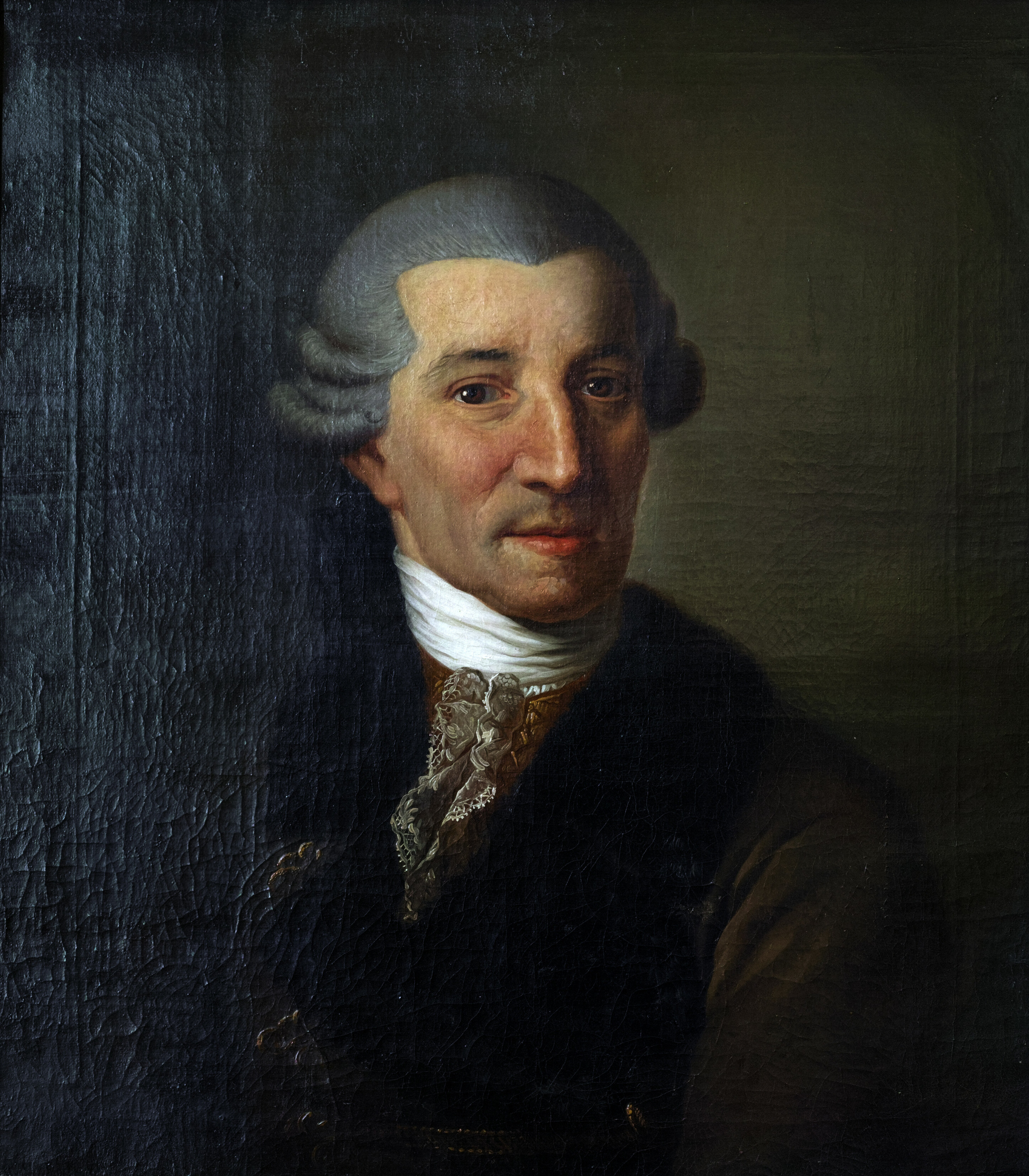
- Haydn at the time he wrote the symphony
- Key: B-flat major
- Catalogue: Hob. I:85
- Composed: 1785/86
- Dedication: Claude-François-Marie Rigoley, Comte d'Ogny
- Published: Vienna, December 1787
- Publisher: Artaria
- Duration: c. 23 minutes
- Movements: 4

Premiere
- Date: 1787
- Location: Paris
- Performers: Concert de la Loge Olympique

The Symphony No. 85 in B♭ major, Hoboken I/85, is the fourth of the six Paris symphonies (numbers 82–87) written by Joseph Haydn. The 85th Symphony was completed in either 1785 or 1786. It made its way to America early on, at first through a keyboard arrangement such as one played by Nelly Custis at the White House.

It is popularly known as La Reine (The Queen); this subtitle originated because the work was a favorite of Marie Antoinette, at the time Queen of France. It is the only one of the Paris symphonies whose subtitles is of 18th-century origin.

A typical performance of the symphony lasts roughly 23 minutes.

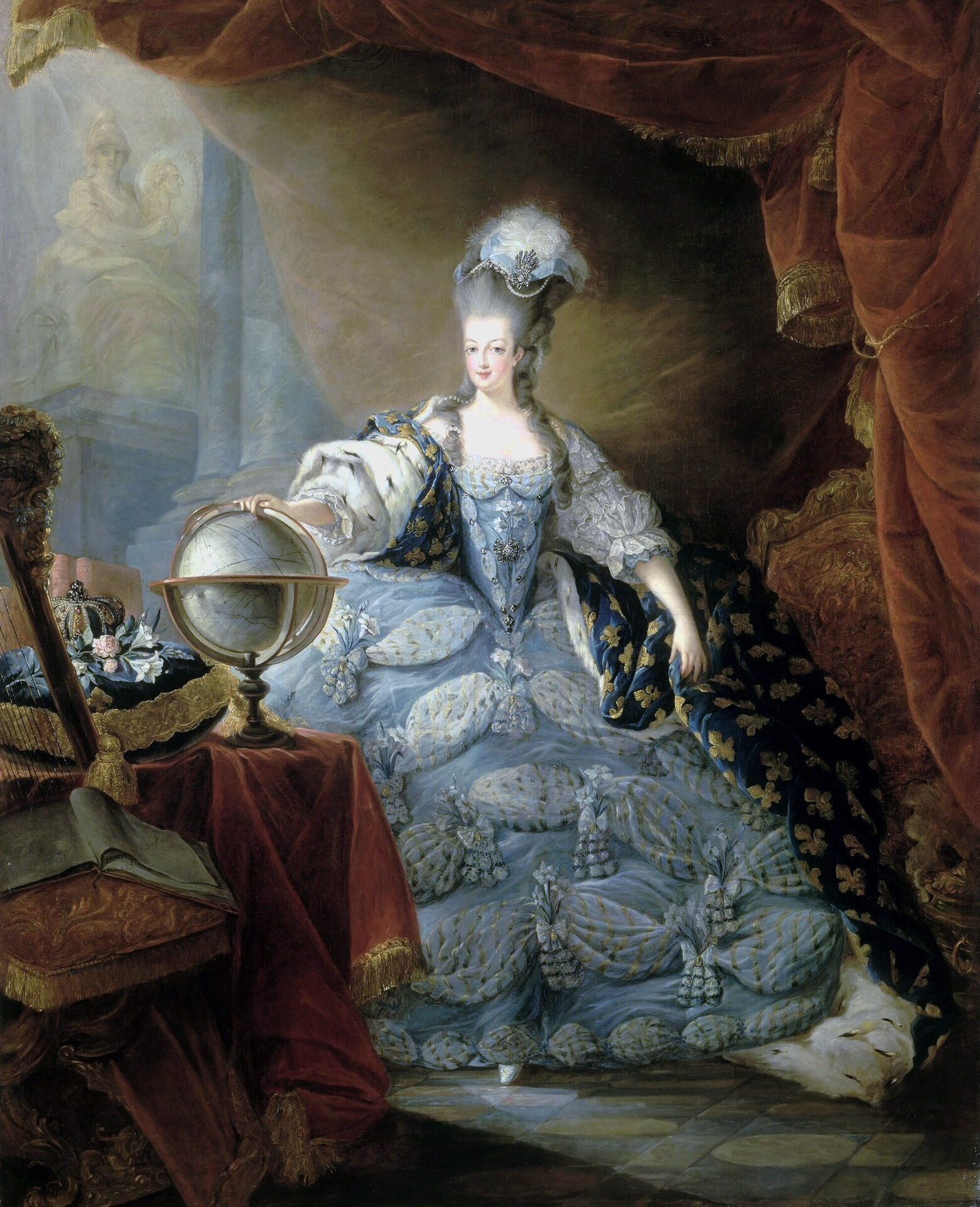
Marie Antoinette, the queen for whom the 85th Symphony is nicknamed

== Music ==
The symphony is scored for flute, two oboes, two bassoons, two horns, and strings.

It is in standard four-movement form

1. Adagio — Vivace
2. Romance: Allegretto
3. Menuetto: Allegretto
4. Finale: Presto

The first movement contains a reference to Symphony No. 45 “Farewell”.

== A source in folk song? ==
The second movement is described by the eminent Haydn scholar H. C. Robbins Landon as "a set of variations on the old French folk-song 'La gentille et jeune Lisette'. This assertion frequently appears in program notes for recordings and symphonic performances. Robbins Landon's own source was the biography of Haydn (1875-1927) written by C. F. Pohl, who provides the text of the putative folk song. The modern musicologist Daniel Heartz disputed Pohl's claim: "Pohl cites no source for this song and none has been found since." Heartz suggests instead that the "folk song" was the result of someone providing words in folk style to a tune original with Haydn. The dispute reflects a wider pattern in the interpretation of folk-like material in Haydn's compositions; see Haydn and folk music.

== See also ==
- List of symphonies by name
