= Manfred Hermann Schmid =

German musicologist and Mozart expert (1947–2021)

Manfred Hermann Schmid (10 August 1947 – 5 October 2021) was a German musicologist and Mozart expert.

== Life ==
Schmid was born in Ottobeuren into a musical family (the father Ernst Fritz Schmid was already Ordinarius for musicology at the University of Tübingen). Schmid decided after his Abitur first to study violin at the Leopold Mozart Centre in Augsburg with the Koeckert-Quartett, before studying musicology, philosophy and history of art at the University of Salzburg, the University of Freiburg, and LMU Munich. He studied musicology with Gerhard Croll, Hans Heinrich Eggebrecht and Thrasybulos Georgiades, whose last doctoral student was Schmid. In 1975, Schmid was awarded a doctorate with a thesis on "Mozart and the Salzburg tradition".

His habilitation was awarded in 1980 on the subject of "Music as an image. Studies on the work of Weber, Schumann and Wagner". Schmid has held various teaching positions at LMU Munich and the University of Bayreuth, the music academies in Munich and Augsburg, as well as a position as director of the Munich Musical Instrument Museum. In 1986, Schmid was appointed full professor of musicology at the University of Tübingen as successor to Georg von Dadelsen. In 1992/93, he was visiting professor at the University of Salzburg. On the occasion of his 60th birthday in 2007, a symposium entitled "Mozart in the Center" was held in Tübingen. Schmid has been retired since October 2012. However, he regularly held teaching positions at LMU Munich and the University of Vienna. Since 2010, he has been chairman of the Academy for Mozart Research at the Mozarteum Foundation Salzburg.

Schmid is considered an internationally renowned Mozart expert, but in his work he devoted himself to the entire European musical tradition from ancient music to new music. However, his main focus lies on the music of the First Viennese School, the German Romantic music and the Renaissance music. Further fields of interest of Schmid were besides the general historical musicology especially the musical instrument, the notation and the Ethnomusicology.

Schmid was editor of the Mozart Studies (ISSN 0942-5217, until 2013, 22nd volume with Schneider, Tutzing, since 2015 with Hollitzer, Vienna) and the Tübinger Beiträge zur Musikwissenschaft.

Manfred Hermann Schmid is buried in the Petersfriedhof in Salzburg, u.z. in the communal crypt, in which Michael Haydn and Mozart's sister Nannerl were also buried.
