= Marie Bobillier =

French musicologist (1858–1918)

Marie Bobillier, real name Antoinette Christine Marie Bobillier (12 April 1858 – 4 November 1918) was a French musicologist, music critic, writing under her pseudonym Michel Brenet.

== Biography ==
Born in Lunéville of a military father, captain and then colonel in the artillery, Marie Bobillier, a single daughter, lived her childhood in several cities, including Strasbourg and Metz, before finally settling in Paris in 1871. She learned to play the piano, but a scarlet fever contracted at the age of thirteen rendered her disabled, influencing her decision to devote her life to research, after having been to the Pasdeloup concerts. She was one of the first French women musicologists.

Her first publication, Histoire de la symphonie à orchestre (1882), won a prize in Brussels (Royal Academy of Science, Letters and Fine Arts of Belgium), engaging her ever-increasing reputation in the French musicological world. With a rigorous method that drew on the most reliable sources and documents, she made a series of publications – several valuable studies devoted to vocal music by Ockeghem, Goudimel, Palestrina (1906), Sébastien de Brossard, Handel, Haydn, Grétry and Berlioz. Bobillier also approached classical and medieval instrumental music and left a precious and independent Dictionnaire pratique et historique de la musique, completed and published by Amédée Gastoué in 1926.

Her book Notes sur l’histoire du luth en France paved the way for further research in this area. Her major works are Les musiciens de la Sainte-Chapelle du Palais("her masterpiece" according to La Laurencie), Les concerts en France sous l’ancien régime and La librairie musicale en France de 1653 à 1790, where she demonstrates her great scholarship and competence as a music historian. Jean-Marie Fauquet summed up Marie Bobillier's work in one sentence: "It is of exceptional quality, both in terms of the variety of subjects dealt with and the method applied".

As a critic or musicologist, she collaborated with magazines such as L'Année musicale (from 1911 to 1913), of which she was one of the founders with Jean Chantavoine (1877–1952), Louis Laloy and Lionel de La Laurencie – she wrote bibliographies of French, German, English and Italian books, in the Revue musicale, the Revue de musicologie, the Archives historiques, artistiques, littéraires, Le Correspondant, the Courrier musical, the Guide du concert, the Journal musical, Le ménestrel and the Tribune de Saint-Gervais (the monthly newsletter of the Schola Cantorum de Paris), etc.; Abroad, she collaborated with the Rivista Musicale Italiana and the Musical Quarterly. She also contributed to Lavignac's Encyclopedia of music. Endowed with a very reserved personality and while "the stage frightened her", she gave a few lectures but declined participating in learned societies.

She left notes, quotations and transcripts, accumulated throughout her research, bound after her death in nineteen volumes, and preserved under the name Documents sur l’histoire de la musique at the Bibliothèque nationale.

Her pseudonym comes from the village of Les Brenets in the Doubs department, where her father's family came from. She died in Paris on 4 November 1918, aged 60.

== Works ==
=== Monographs ===
- Histoire de la symphonie à orchestre : depuis ses origines jusqu'à Beethoven inclusivement (pdf) (in French). Paris: Gauthier-Villars. 1882. p. 168. OCLC 3797930. BnF 352552664. (a work distinguished by the Royal Academy of Science, Letters and Fine Arts of Belgium)
- Grétry : sa vie et ses œuvres (pdf). Royal Academy of Science, Letters and Fine Arts of Belgium (in French). Brussels: F. Hayez. 1884. p. 287. OCLC 606230105. BnF 301165117.
- Deux pages de la vie de Berlioz; les œuvres de Berlioz en Allemagne; le premier opéra de Berlioz (in French). Paris: L. Vanier. 1889. p. 72. OCLC 12737478.
- Jean de Ockeghem; maître de la chapelle des rois Charles VII et Louis XI, étude bio-bibliographique, d'après des documents inédits (in French). Nogent-le-Rotrou: impr. de Daupeley-Gouverneur. 1893. p. 32. OCLC 491487575. BnF 30116513x.
- Sébastien de Brossard; prêtre, compositeur et bibliophile (165.–1730) : d'après ses papiers inédits (in French). Geneva: (Nogent-le-Rotrou, 1896) Éditions Minkoff. 1998. p. 53. ISBN 978-2826609346. OCLC 40551890. BnF 352552753 – via Société de l'histoire de Paris et de l'île-de-France.
- Claude Goudimel; essai bio-bibliographique. Musique, les hommes et les instruments (in French). Paris/Tours: (Besançon, P. Jaquin, 1898) Éditions Coderg / Librairie Ars Musicale. 1982. p. 46. OCLC 11853533.
- La musique dans les couvents de femmes depuis le moyen âge jusqu'à nos jours (conférence, Tribune de Saint-Gervais, iv (1898), 25, 58, 73) (in French). Paris: Bureaux de la Schola cantorum. 1898. p. 18. OCLC 44851066. BnF 318296097.
- Notes sur l'histoire du luth en France (Rivista musicale italiana, v (1898), 637–676; vi (1899), 1–44 – and Turin, 1899) (in French). Geneva: Éditions Minkoff. 1973. p. 83. ISBN 978-2826600572. OCLC 729882.
- La musique sacrée sous Louis XIV (lecture) (in French). Paris: Bureau d'edition de la Schola Cantorum. 1899. p. 17. OCLC 24950631.
- Les concerts en France sous l'ancien régime (pdf) (in French). Paris: Fischbacher. 1900. p. 407.
- La jeunesse de Rameau (Rivista musicale italiana, ix (1902), 658–693, 860–887; x (1903), 62–85, 185–206) (in French). Turin: Fratelli Bocca Editori. 1902. p. 109. OCLC 812640. BnF 31829604h.
- Palestrina (pdf). Maîtres de la musique (in French). Paris: Félix Alcan. 1906. p. 229. OCLC 6150626. BnF 42877100j.
- "La librairie musicale en France de 1653 à 1790, d'après les registres de privilèges (Sammelbände der Internationalen Musikgesellschaft, viii (1906–7), 401–466)". Sammelbände der Internationalen Musikgesellschaft E.v. (in French). Leipzig: 65. 1907. ISSN 1612-0124. OCLC 844123473.
- La plus ancienne méthode française de musique : L'art, science et pratique de plaine musique (Jacques Moderne, ca. 1530) with introduction and appendix (in French). Paris: Bureaux d'édition de la Schola Cantorum. 1907. p. 32. OCLC 458585958. BnF 31829619j.
- Haydn (pdf). Maîtres de la musique (in French). Paris: F. Alcan. 1909. pp. 207. OCLC 9116365. BnF 42877089v.
- Les musiciens de la Sainte-Chapelle du Palais; documents inédits, recueillis et annotés par Michel Brenet (Paris, A. Picard, 1910) (pdf). Publications de la Société internationale de musique (in French). Geneva: Éditions Minkoff. 1973. p. 379. ISBN 978-2826600411. OCLC 1149112.
- Musique et musiciens de la vieille France (pdf) (in French). Paris: F. Alcan. 1911. pp. 249. OCLC 3201267. (contient : Les musiciens de Philippe le Hardi, Jean de Ockeghem, maître de la chapelle des rois Charles VII et Louis XI, et Essai sur les origines de la musique descriptive par Jacques Mauduit)
- Haendel; biographie critique, illustrée de douze planches hors texte (pdf). Les musiciens célèbres (in French). Paris: H. Laurens. 1912. pp. 126. OCLC 2714575. BnF 35254998f.
- Musiciens d’autrefois (Paris, 1912)
- La musique militaire; étude critique, illustrée de douze planches hors texte (pdf). Musiciens célèbres (in French). Paris: H. Laurens. 1917. pp. 126. OCLC 1978378. BnF 31829611s.
- Dictionnaire pratique et historique de la musique (complété par A. Gastoué) (pdf) (in French). Paris: Armand Colin. 1926. p. 487. OCLC 4530106.

=== Articles ===
(chronological order)

- Gounod et la musique sacrée ?, Le Correspondant, 10 December 1893 p. 965–986. BnF 387176603
- Quatre femmes musiciennes : Jacquet de La Guerre, Hélène de Montgeroult, Louise Bertin, Louise Farrenc, L’Art 2nd series, volume 4 (1894), (pp. 107–112, 142–147, 177–183/183–187), Jacquet de La Guerre, Hélène de Montgeroult, Louise Bertin et L. Farrenc.
- Les Opéras féminins, Gazette musicale de la Suisse Romande, 28 February 1895, (pp. 68–72).
- "Jean Mouton", Tribune de Saint-Gervais 5 (1899), (pp. 323–334).
- "Guy d’Arezzo", Ponthus Teutonicus et l’abbé Odon », Tribune de Saint-Gervais 8 (1902), (pp. 121).
- L’amitié de Berlioz et de Liszt, Guide musical 50 (1904), (pp. 595–687).
- "Deux comptes de la chapelle-musique des rois de France". Sammelbände der Internationalen Musikgesellschaft (in French). Vol. 6, no. 1. Leipzig. October–December 1904. pp. 1–31. ISSN 1612-0124. JSTOR 929008. OCLC 6733321354. Brenet1904..
- "Les débuts de l'abonnement de musique". Mercure Musical (in French). Vol. 2, no. 19/20. Paris. 15 October 1906. pp. 256–273. ISSN 1763-7287. OCLC 843350862. Brenet1906.
- Mme de Genlis musicienne, Revue musicale S.I.M. 2 (1912), (pp. 1–14) Read online.
- L'Année musicale (F. Alcan)
  - L'Année musicale 1911 vol. 1 on archive.org, Deux traductions françaises inédites des institutions harmoniques de Zarlino (1911) (pp. 125–144).
  - L'Année musicale 1912 vol. 2 on archive.org, Participe à la bibliographie uniquement
  - L'Année musicale 1913 vol. 3 on archive.org, Bibliographie des bibliographies musicales, Année musicale (1913), (pp. 1–52), BnF 42877079j

=== Publisher ===
Marie Bobillier published music scores by Alexandre-Pierre-François Boëly at M. Senart (before 1909).

- 30 caprices, opus 2 (1816)
- 24 pieces for piano, opus 22 (1858)
- Pieces for piano, opus 34 (1810)
- Pieces for piano, opus 47 (1846)
- Pieces for piano, opus 48 (1848–51)
- Pieces for piano, opus 50 (1816–1854)
- Pieces for piano, opus 51 (1853)
- Pieces for piano, opus 52 (1853)
- Pieces for piano, opus 55 (1855)
