= Ernst Fritz Schmid =

German musicologist

Ernst Fritz Schmid (7 March 1904 – 20 January 1960) was a German musicologist and Mozart scholar.

== Life ==
Born in Tübingen, Schmid was the son of Wilhelm Schmid from Graz and grandson of Karl Emil Kauffmann. Initially, Schmid studied violin, viola and viola d'amore at the Akademie der Tonkunst in Munich from 1924 to 1927 and was also active as a violist in Düsseldorf in 1927. He then studied musicology in Freiburg, Tübingen and Vienna. He received his doctorate in 1929 and his habilitation in 1934. From 1935 to 1937 he was Extraordinarius for Musicology at the University of Tübingen and its university music director. Around 1937 he was robbed of his position by the National Socialists and initially worked as choir director in the southern German communities of Amorbach and Miltenberg as well as in Augsburg until he was enlisted as a soldier in 1940. During the war he married Lotte Köbele from Munich in 1942, with whom he had three sons. Schmid is the father of the Tübingen professor emeritus and Mozart researcher Manfred Hermann Schmid.

Since 1945, at Schmid's suggestion, classical concerts have been held in the Ottobeuren Abbey and in the Kaisersaal there in the series Ottobeurer Konzerte, partly with world-famous conductors such as Herbert von Karajan and Leonard Bernstein. Although Schmid was one of the most important co-founders of the Deutsche Mozart-Gesellschaft in 1951 and was one of the supporting institutions of the Neue Mozart-Ausgabe, there was no employment for him until the 1950s. It was not until 1958 that he was able to buy his own apartment in Augsburg.

Schmid was considered to be an internationally recognized Mozart expert and was one of the most important pioneers and collaborators of the Neue Mozart-Ausgabe and its first edition director from 1954 to 1960. In his work, however, he also devoted himself to numerous other areas of musicology, including in particular Joseph Haydn and his complete edition. On the occasion of his death the brochure In memoriam Ernst Fritz Schmid (1904-1960): ein Gedenkblatt für seine Angehörigen und Freunde was published.

In 1957 Schmid was a founding member of the Gesellschaft für Bayerische Musikgeschichte.

Schmid died in Augsburg at age 55.

== Publications ==
- Carl Philipp Emanuel Bach und seine Kammermusik: With 18 collotype plates and an appendix of notes. Bärenreiter publishing house, 1931, 188 pages.
- Joseph Haydn Werke für das Laufwerk (Flötenuhr) für Klavier zu zwei Händen and first published by Schmid. Special edition of Nagel's music archive. Publisher Adolph Nagel, Hannover 1931.
- Mozart und das geistliche Augsburg, insonderheit das Chorherrnstift Heilig Kreuz. In Zeitschrift des Historischen Vereins für Schwaben, 55/56 (1942/43), pp. 40–202.
- Ein schwäbisches Mozart Buch (1948).
- Leopold Mozart (1719–1787). In Götz von Pöllnitz (edit.): Lebensbilder aus dem Bayerischen Schwaben, 3 (Publications of the Schwäbische Forschungsgemeinschaft at the Commission for Bavarian Regional History 3, 3). Hueber, Munich 1954, pp. 346–368.
