= Symphony No. 104 (Haydn) =

Musical work by Joseph Haydn, composed in 1795

- London
- by Joseph Haydn
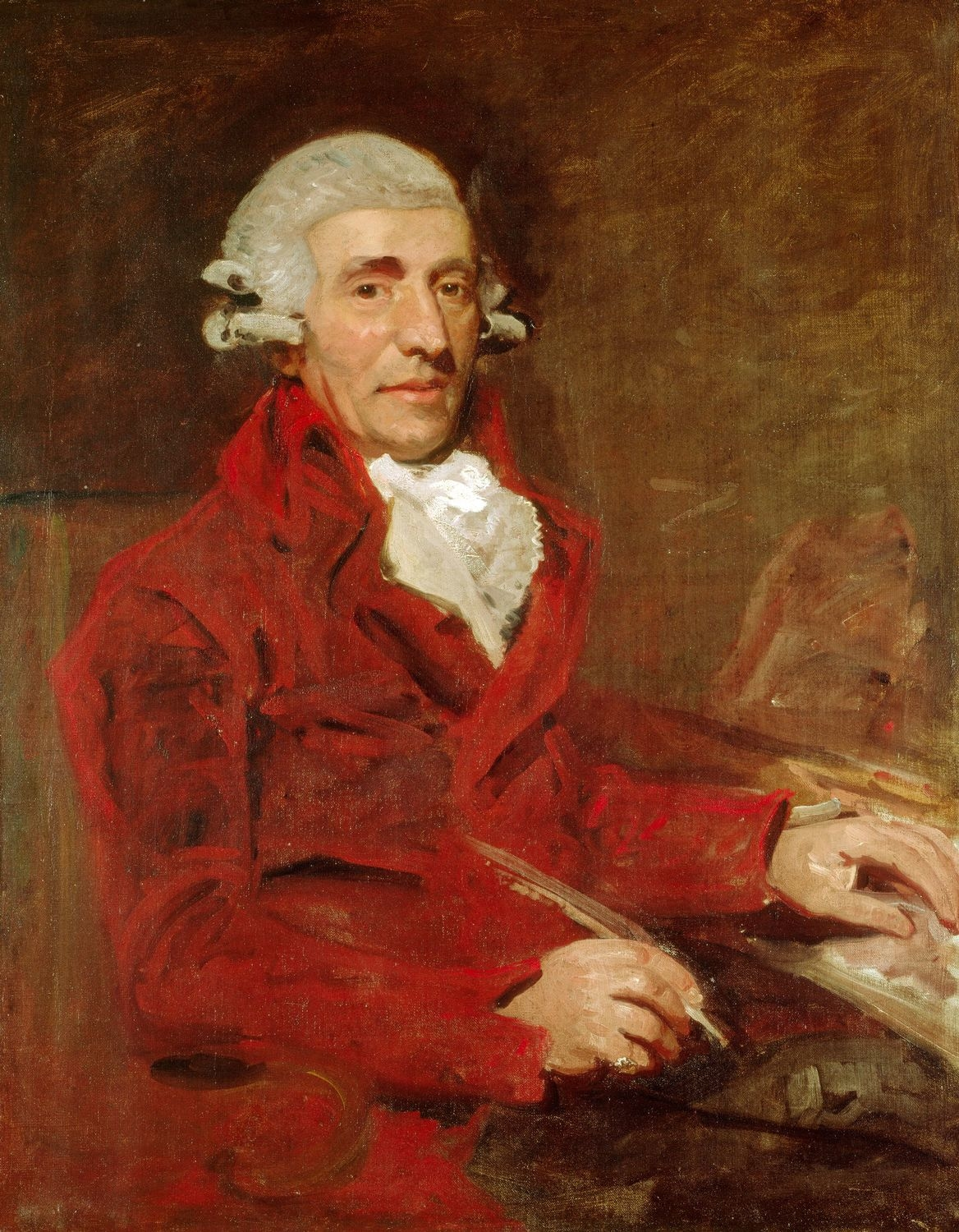
- Haydn in around 1792
- Other name: Salomon
- Key: D major
- Catalogue: Hob. I:104
- Composed: 1795
- Duration: c. 30 minutes
- Movements: 4
- Scoring: Orchestra

Premiere
- Date: 4 May 1795
- Location: King's Theatre, London
- Conductor: Joseph Haydn

The Symphony No. 104 in D major, Hob. I:104, is Joseph Haydn's final symphony, as well as the last of the twelve London symphonies. It is known (somewhat arbitrarily, given the existence of eleven others) as the London Symphony. In Germany, it is commonly known as the Salomon Symphony after Johann Peter Salomon, who arranged Haydn's two tours of London, even though it is one of three of the last twelve symphonies written for Viotti’s Opera Concerts, rather than for Salomon.

The work was composed in 1795 while Haydn was living in London, and premiered there at the King's Theatre on 4 May 1795, in a concert featuring exclusively Haydn's own compositions and directed by the composer. The premiere was a success; Haydn wrote in his diary, "The whole company was thoroughly pleased and so was I. I made 4,000 gulden on this evening: such a thing is possible only in England."

The autograph manuscript of the symphony is preserved in the Berlin State Library.

== Music ==
I. Adagio – Allegro

II. Andante

III. Menuetto and Trio: Allegro

IV. Finale: Spiritoso
Performed by the Evergreen Symphony Orchestra

The symphony is scored for two flutes, two oboes, two clarinets in A, two bassoons, two horns in D and G, two trumpets in D, timpani, violins 1 & 2, violas, cellos, and double basses.

It has four movements:

1. Adagio – Allegro, 4/4 then 2/2
2. Andante, 2/4 in G major
3. Menuetto and Trio: Allegro, 3/4
4. Finale: Spiritoso, 2/2

=== I. Adagio – Allegro ===
The symphony opens with a slow and grand introduction in D minor, whose first two bars are as follows:

Note that since the only notes used are the tonic and dominant, it is not clear whether the movement is in the major or minor key. This heralds a lengthy introduction in the minor key – in performance, the introduction is typically two minutes of the movement's overall nine-minute length. The introduction transitions to the main body of the movement in D major, which is in sonata form. Its opening theme is as follows:

The movement is monothematic: the second theme is simply the first theme transposed to A major. The exposition is in D major, with the strings playing the first theme. The theme goes straight into A major with the woodwinds to form a second theme. The exposition closes with a codetta and is followed by the development which begins in B minor, using the rhythmic pattern of the second half of the theme. The development ends with the full orchestra. In the recapitulation, the first theme is heard again in D major. It uses imitative patterns of the woodwinds in the second theme. The movement closes with a coda, also in D major.

=== II. Andante ===
This movement, in G major, opens with the main theme in the strings. After this, a brief episode highlighting A minor and D minor leads to a modified repeat of the main theme in both strings and bassoon. From here, a second section begins which modulates to various other keys, including G minor and B♭ major, but continues to feature the melody of the main theme. After arriving on the dominant of G major, the music of the first section returns. The rest of the movement consists of a modification of the first section of music, with several changes in rhythm and more prominence to the winds, especially the flute.

=== III. Menuetto and Trio: Allegro ===
The third movement is a minuet and trio in D major. The minuet section consists of a rounded binary (A,B,A') form with an opening section emphasizing the tonic, while the second section visits the relative minor (B minor) and the dominant (A major). The trio is in B♭ major, and uses the oboe and bassoon extensively. Like in the minuet, this trio's B section emphasizes the relative minor (in this case, G minor). The trio ends with a transition back to dominant of the main key in preparation for the return to the minuet.

=== IV. Finale: Spiritoso ===
The exuberant finale, in fast tempo and in sonata form, opens in the mode of folk music, using a drone bass and a theme often claimed to have originated as a Croatian folk song; for details see Haydn and folk music. The development section settles on the dominant of the main key, as is typical, but the recapitulation does not occur immediately. Instead, the development is extended with a section in F♯ minor, after which the recapitulation in D major follows immediately.

== See also ==
- List of symphonies by name
