= Franjo Kuhač =

Austro-Hungarian musicologist

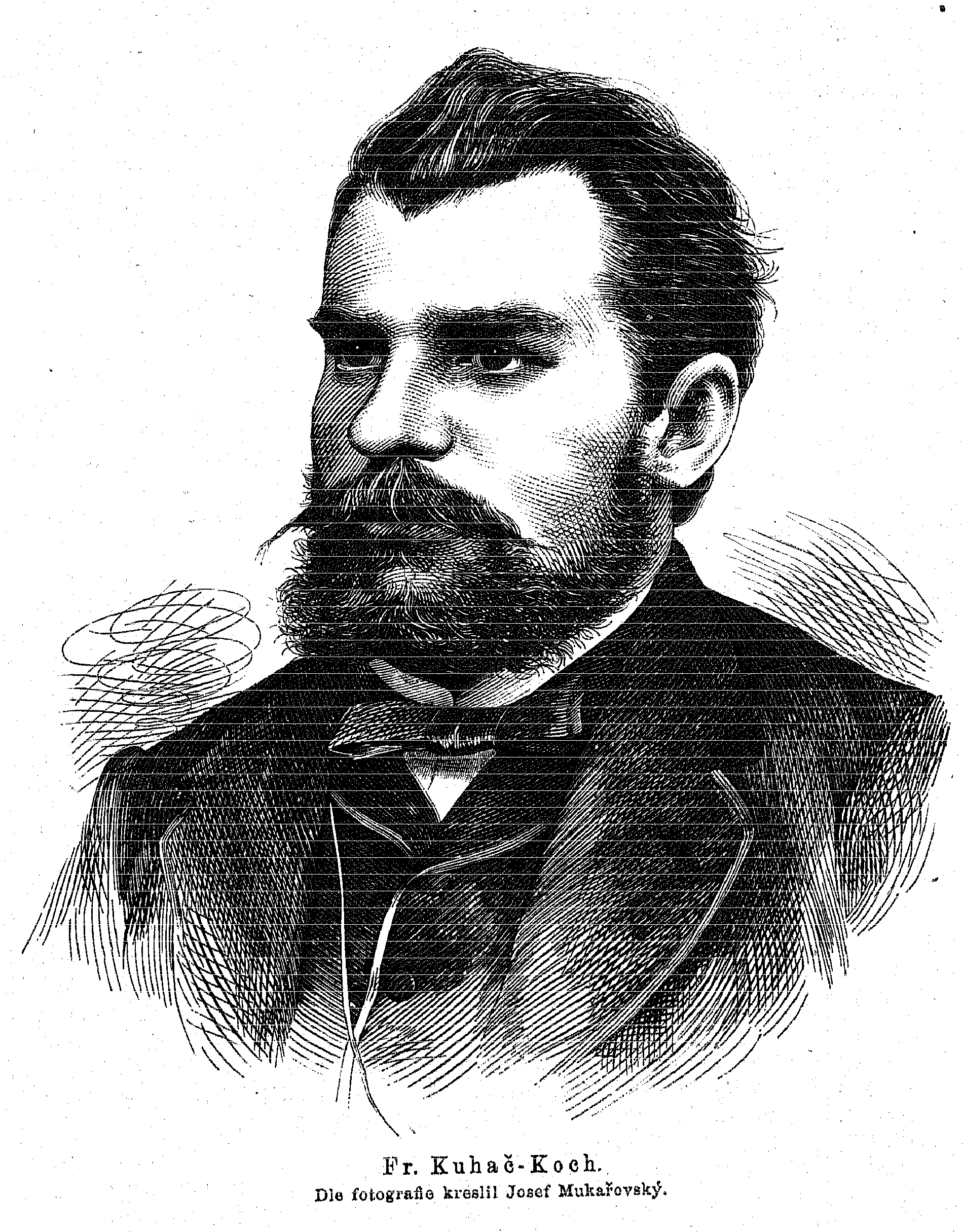
Franjo Kuhač (1874)

Franjo Ksaver Kuhač (November 20, 1834 – June 18, 1911) was a Croatian piano teacher, choral conductor, composer, and comparative musicologist who studied Croatian folk music. Kuhač did a great deal of field work in this area, collecting and publishing 1,600 folk songs. Like Cecil Sharp, who did similar work in Britain and Appalachia, Kuhač published the folk songs with a piano accompaniment.

== Biography ==
Kuhač was born in Osijek on 20 November 1834 in a German family as Franz Xaver Koch. In Osijek he finished elementary school and Gymnasium. From 1848 to 1851 he was training to become a teacher in Donji Miholjac. After becoming a teacher, Kuhač went to study music in Pest, Hungary. Later, he went to Vienna, Leipzig and Weimar where Franz Liszt taught him piano playing. While analyzing different kinds of traditional music and discussing with his teachers about the relationship of folk music and classical music, he found out the value of folk music. From 1858 to 1871 he taught piano playing and singing in Osijek. He also was the chairman of the Osijek singing society where he conducted works of Slavic composers. In that period, he traveled across Europe, from Bulgaria to Germany and from Slovenia to Macedonia. He probably collected over 5000 folk songs in that period. In 1871 he changed his name to Franjo Ksaver Kuhač. In 1871 he moved to Zagreb where he taught piano at the Croatian Musical Institute (HGZ). From 1878 to 1881 he published his magnum opus, Južnoslavenske narodne popjevke (Southslavic folk songs). Most of the Croatian musicological etymology was introduced by Kuhač when he translated Johann Christian Lobe's Katechismus der Musik. He published the following books:

- Južnoslavenske narodne popjevke (South-Slavic Folk Songs), Zagreb, 1871
- Uputa u glasoviranje (Instruction in Piano-Playing), two volumes, 1896 and 1897
- Valpovo i njegovi gospodari (Valpovo And Its Proprietors), Zagreb, 1876
- Ilirski glazbenici (Illyrian Musicians), Zagreb, 1893

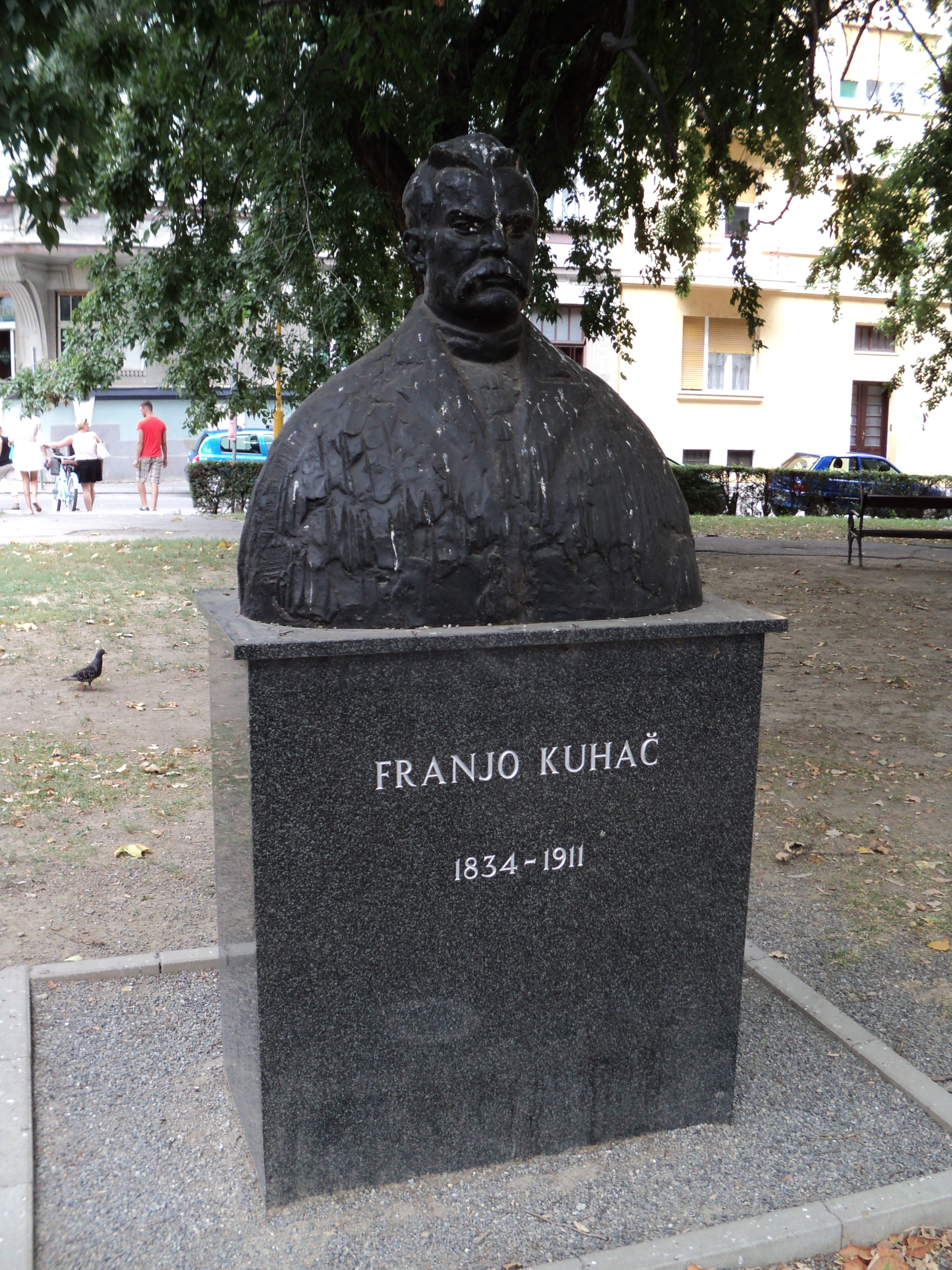
Kuhač's bust in Osijek

Kuhač became well known for tracing similarities between the Croatian folk tunes he collected and various themes in the music of Joseph Haydn. He was also known for his conjecture that Haydn was not Austrian but Croatian, a member of the Croatian ethnic minority resident in the Burgenland region of Austria. For more on both of these aspects of Kuhač's research, see Haydn and folk music.

Franjo Kuhač died on 18 June 1911 in Zagreb and was buried at Mirogoj Cemetery.

== Assessment ==
The composer Béla Bartók, himself a distinguished fieldworker, spent considerable time examining Kuhač's published materials during the 1940s while doing editorial and analytical work on the fieldwork of Milman Parry. Bartók arrived at a rather negative view of Kuhač's work.

He seems to be rather mediocre as a transcriber of melodies and as an observer. In addition, he could not resist the then prevailing fashion of publishing many hundreds of folk melodies with piano accompaniment—sheer waste of time and space, even if the accompaniment were better than it is.

== Sources ==
- Kuhač, Franjo Ksaver (in Croatian)
- Bartók, Béla and Albert Lord (1951) Serbo-Croatian Folk Songs. New York: Columbia University Press.
