= Michael Schade =

Canadian opera singer (born 1965)

Michael Schade OC
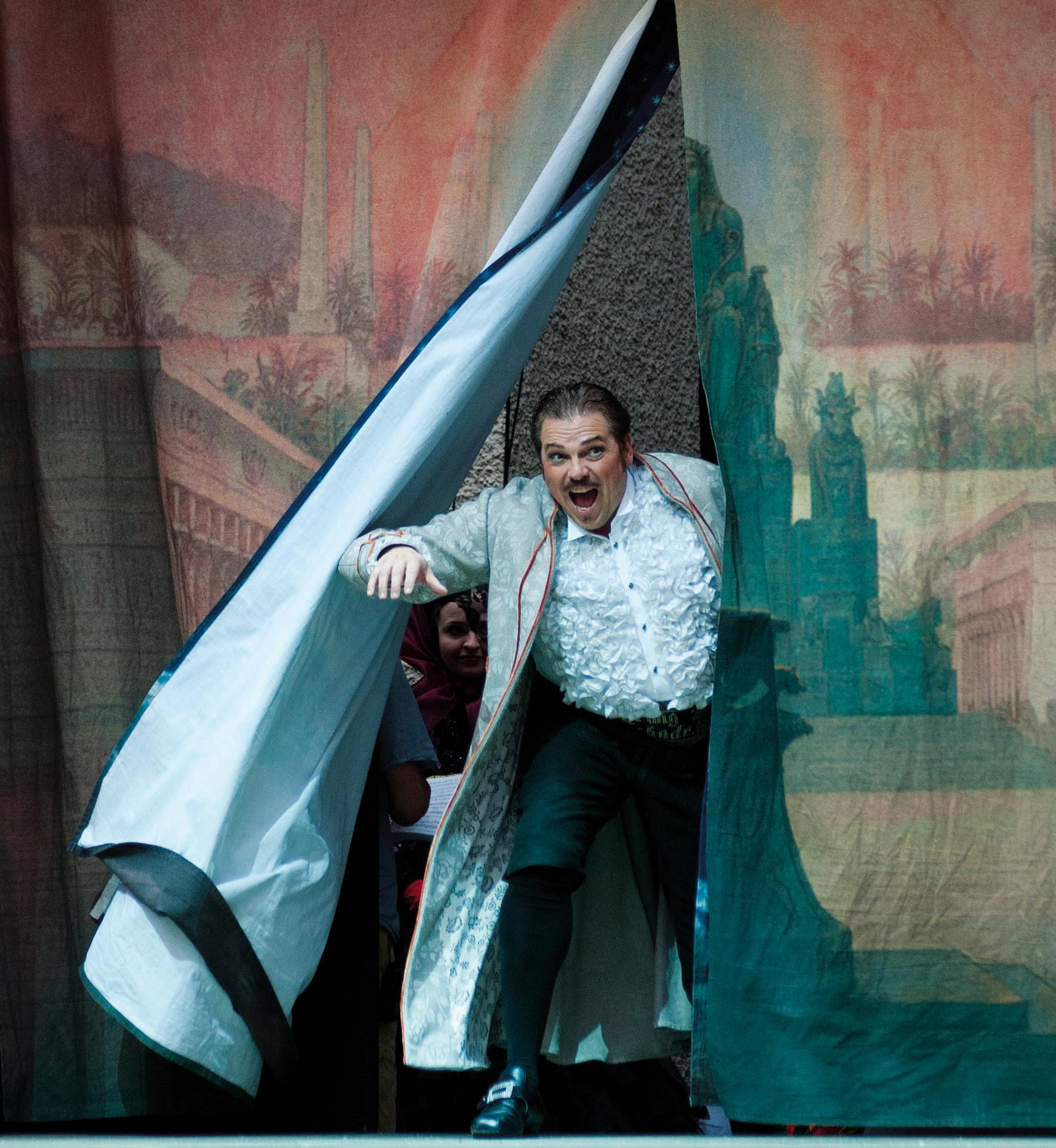
- Michael Schade as Tamino in The Magic Flute's Second Part, Salzburg Festival 2012
- Born: 23 January 1965 (age 61); Geneva, Switzerland
- Occupation: Operatic tenor
- Years active: 1991–present
- Title: Kammersänger

Michael Schade OC (born 23 January 1965) is a Canadian operatic tenor, who was born in Geneva and raised in Germany and Canada. He and his wife Dee McKee, and their youngest child live in Vienna, Austria; the rest of the family lives in Canada.

== Life and career ==
Schade attended St. Michael's Choir School in Toronto, then the Faculty of Music in the University of Western Ontario and on to the Curtis Institute of Music for his master's degree.

Schade has performed at the Canadian Opera Company, Vienna State Opera, Salzburg Festival, Metropolitan Opera, Washington Opera, Opéra National de Paris, San Francisco Opera, Hamburg State Opera, the Lyric Opera of Chicago and the Los Angeles Opera. At the Vienna State Opera, Schade has appeared in Daphne, Don Giovanni, Così fan tutte, Die Entführung aus dem Serail, Die Zauberflöte, Arabella, Il barbiere di Siviglia, L'elisir d'amore, Die schweigsame Frau and Die Meistersinger von Nürnberg. He is a regular guest of the world-famous Lied-festival Schubertiade in Schwarzenberg, Austria.

In 2005, he performed in Carl Nielsen's Maskarade in the Royal Opera, London's premiere of David Pountney's production.

Schade's discography includes a recording of "Die schöne Müllerin" with pianist Malcolm Martineau (CBC Records) which funds and supports leukaemia research, a performance of the role of Ralph Rackstraw in Sir Charles Mackerras's CD of H.M.S. Pinafore, and Daphne (Decca). He made his first solo recording – Of Ladies and Love – Songs of Beethoven, Schubert, Liszt, Ravel, Fauré, and Richard Strauss—for Hyperion; BBC Music Magazine gave it a 5-star review, saying, "He sings Strauss's 'Cäcilie', and a wonderfully hushed 'Zueignung' as though he and Martineau were the first to discover their ecstasy."

From December 2011 until October 2013 Schade was a member of the board of the European Academy of Music Theatre. Since Pentecost 2014, Michael Schade has been the artistic director of The Internationale Barocktage Stift Melk Schade holds professorship in historical performance practice in the faculty of Early Music at the University of Music and Performing Arts Vienna.

== Awards and honours ==
Schade's recording of the St Matthew Passion (Teldec), conducted by Nikolaus Harnoncourt, won the 2002 Grammy Award for Best Choral Performance.

In March 2007, Schade has been awarded the Austrian title of Kammersänger.

In 2016, Schade was appointed as an officer in the Order of Canada. In 2017, he was awarded the Great Golden Decoration of Honour for Service to the State of Lower Austria (Große Goldene Ehrenzeichen für Verdienste um das Bundesland Niederösterreich).

== Selected discography ==
- The Creation (DGG)
- Die Zauberflöte (DGG Archiv)
- Leonore with John Eliot Gardiner
- St John Passion
- St Matthew Passion
- Elijah
- Paulus
- Christus by Anton Rubinstein with Helmuth Rilling (Hännsler)
- Fidelio under Sir Colin Davis (BMG)
- Die Meistersinger von Nürnberg with Wolfgang Sawallisch (EMI)
- Otello with Myung-Whun Chung (DGG)
- Joseph Haydn's Theresien-messe
- Missa Sancti Nicolai with Trevor Pinnock (DGG Archiv)
- Soirée Française with baritone Russell Braun (1997, CBC Records) – winner of the Juno Award and the Gabriel Fauré Award in France
- Serata Italiana, featuring Italian opera arias and duets with Russell Braun (CBC Records)
- Das Lied von der Erde (DGG)
- H.M.S. Pinafore with Sir Charles Mackerras (Telarc)
