= Theresienmesse =

Mass by Joseph Haydn

- Mass by Joseph Haydn
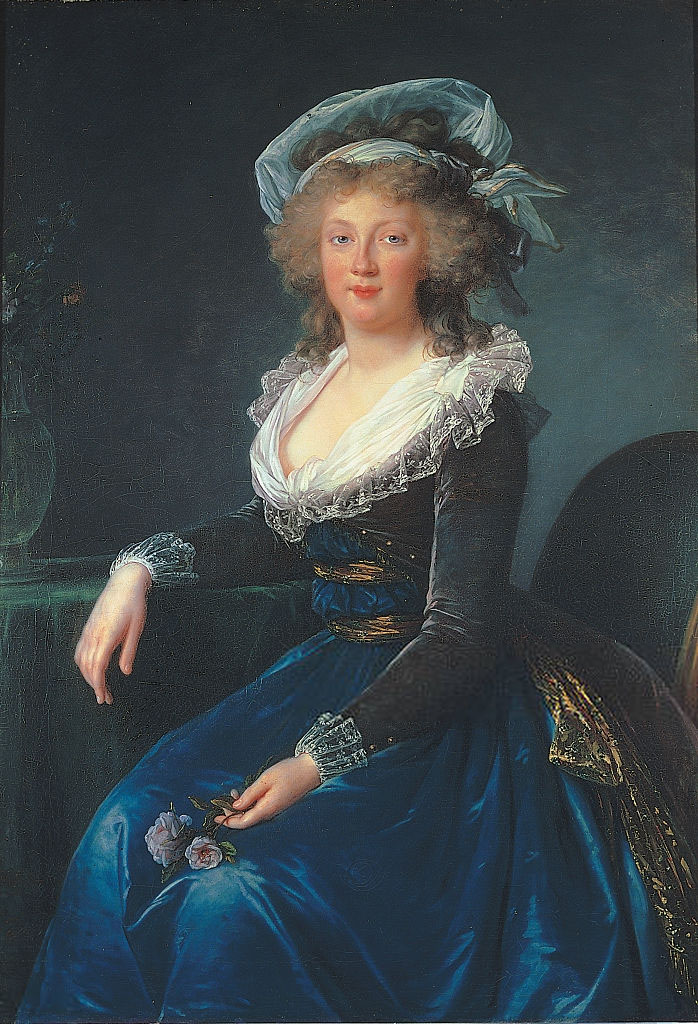
- Maria Theresa of the Two Sicilies, for whom the mass is nicknamed
- Key: B♭ major
- Catalogue: Hob. XXII/12
- Performed: 8 September 1799: Eisenstadt
- Vocal: SATB choir and soloists
- Instrumental: orchestra

Theresienmesse (H. XXII/12) (also known in English as the " 'Maria Theresa' Mass") is a mass in B♭ major written by Joseph Haydn and named after Maria Theresa of the Two Sicilies, empress consort of Francis II. The empress herself was the soprano soloist at private performances of both The Creation and The Seasons in May 1801 at the Viennese Court. The title does not appear on the autograph score, which is labeled simply with the Latin word "Missa".

Between 1796 and 1802, Haydn composed six masses to celebrate the name-day of Princess Maria Josepha Hermenegilde (1768-1845), who was the wife of his patron Prince Nikolaus Esterhazy II. The Theresienmesse, written in 1799, belongs in this series. The work is thought to have been premiered on 8 September 1799. The location was the Bergkirche, near the Esterházy family seat in Eisenstadt, Austria.

The mass is scored for solo quartet, chorus, strings, two clarinets, two trumpets, timpani and organ continuo. Concerning the paucity of winds (no oboes, bassoons, horns, or flutes) John W. Ehrlich has written:

The drastic reduction of the wind choir ... is unusual. We are indebted to [Haydn scholar Carl Maria] Brand for an explanation: a shortage of wind players at Eisenstadt in 1798 and 1799. This is why the Nelsonmesse, in its original version, also lacks winds. But Haydn has turned this lack into a virtue, the ensemble in each case imparting to the work a unique aura or personality that sets it off from its neighbors: in the Nelsonmesse the hard, metallic, fiery brilliance of D trumpets and solo organ; in the Theresienmesse the mellow glow and at times darkish hues of the B-flat instruments.

While probably not as frequently performed as its companions the Nelson Mass or the Missa in tempore belli, the Theresienmesse has attracted critical admiration; Ehrlich for instance refers to it as an "extraordinary work." Another commentator writes, "Haydn's choral writing has all the variety, rhythmic energy and contrapuntal skill of a composer at the height of his powers."

== Scoring and structure ==
The vocal parts of the mass are performed by four soloists (soprano, alto, tenor and bass) and a four-part choir. The soloists often appear as an ensemble, without arias. Haydn scored the mass for a large orchestra.

In the following table of the movements, the markings, keys and time signatures are taken from the choral score, using the symbols for common time and alla breve. The choir is present in all movements, except the Et incarnatus of the Credo.

| No. | Part | Incipit | Solo voices | Marking | Key | Time |
|---|---|---|---|---|---|---|
| 1 | Kyrie | | S A T B S A T B | Adagio; Allegro; Adagio | B♭ major | common time |
| 2 | Gloria | Gloria in excelsis Deo | | Allegro | B♭ major | 3/4 |
| 2 | Gloria | Gratias agimus tibi | S A T B | Moderato | C major C minor | common time |
| 2 | Gloria | Quoniam tu solus Sanctus | S A T B | Vivace | B♭ major | common time |
| 3 | Credo | Credo in unum Deum | | Allegro | B♭ major | common time |
| 3 | Credo | Et incarnatus est | S A T B | Adagio | B♭ minor | common time |
| 3 | Credo | Et resurrexit | S A T B | Allegro | B♭ major | common time |
| 3 | Credo | Et vitam venturi saeculi | S A T B | Allegro | B♭ major | 6/8 |
| 4 | Sanctus | Sanctus Dominus | S A T B | Andante | B♭ major | 3/4 |
| 4 | Sanctus | Pleni sunt coeli et terra | | Allegro | B♭ major | 3/4 |
| 5 | Benedictus | Benedictus qui venit | S A T B | Moderato | G major | cut time |
| 6 | Agnus Dei | Agnus Dei | | Adagio | G minor | 3/4 |
| 6 | Agnus Dei | Dona nobis pacem | S A T B | Allegro | B♭ major | 3/4 |
