= Wallace Long =

American choral conductor

Wallace H. Long, Jr.
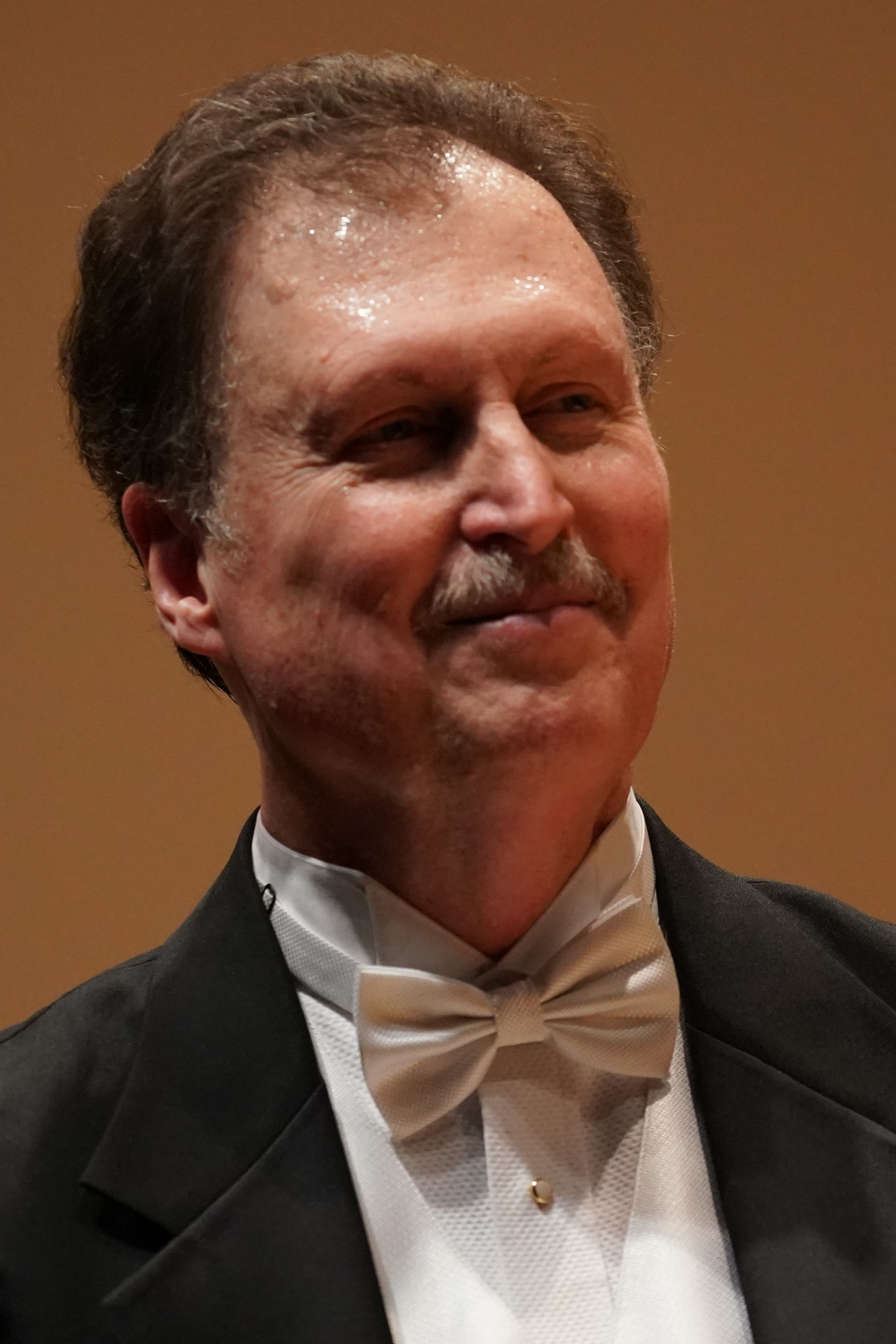
- Long in 2020

Background information
- Born: Wallace Harris Long, Jr. 1952 (age 73–74); Carlsbad, New Mexico
- Genres: Choral music, Vocal jazz
- Occupations: Conductor, Professor

Wallace Harris Long, Jr. is an American choral conductor, educator, and vocalist. He was director of choral activities at Willamette University from 1983 to 2020, founded the Willamette Master Chorus and conducted the group from 1985 to 1998, and was a member of Male Ensemble Northwest. Long has been called "a world-class conductor" and "the ultimate professor, scholar and community-builder".

== Career ==
While Long initially considered going into a career in finance, his experiences singing in choir led him to pursue music instead. He received a Bachelor of music degree from the University of Arizona at Tucson, where he sang under Jean Berger. He would later acquire a Master's and Doctorate in choral conducting. His doctoral thesis examines early conducting techniques.

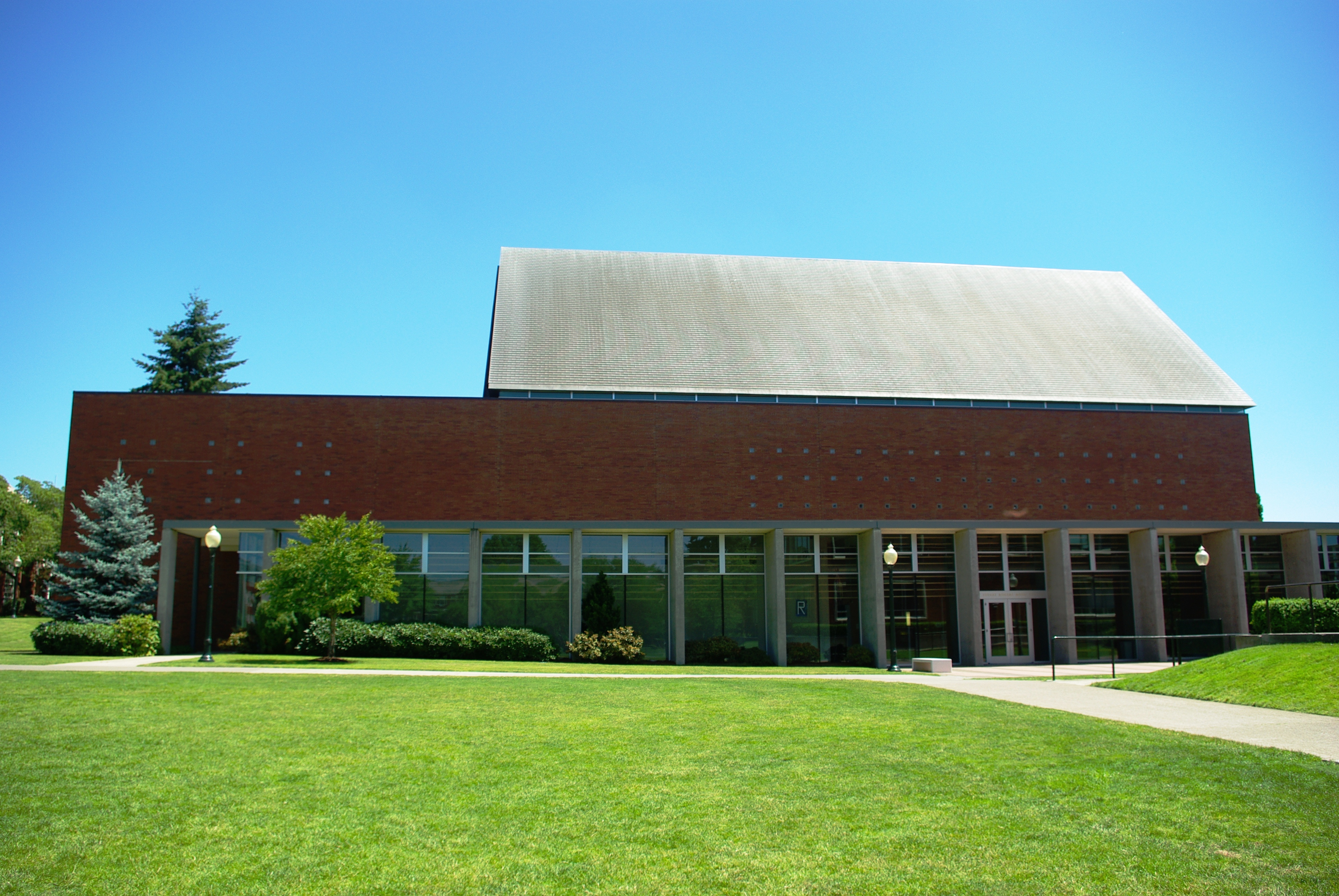
Mary Stuart Rogers Music Center

Long joined the faculty at Willamette University in 1983 and was chair of the Music department from 1994 to 2001. At Willamette, he directed the Chamber Choir and Willamette Singers (A jazz ensemble), as well as teaching conducting and other courses. Long oversaw the construction of the Mary Stuart Rogers Music Center, which houses the University's primary concert and rehearsal halls.

A frequent adjudicator and clinician, Long has served as a guest conductor for the Kansas and Wyoming All-State Choirs as well as the Texas Two-Year College All-State Choir, the Fairbanks Festival of the Arts, and the Bangkok International Choral Festival. He sang as a member of the Robert Shaw Festival Singers from 1993 to 1996. In May 2006, Long conducted Haydn’s Mass in the Time of War in Carnegie Hall. He is a past president of the Oregon chapter of the American Choral Directors Association.

== Awards ==
- Faculty Mentor, Best Large Undergraduate Vocal Jazz Ensemble for Willamette Singers’ CD “I'll Sing For You”, 2014 DownBeat Magazine Student Music Awards, June 2014
- Faculty Mentor, Best Large Undergraduate Vocal Jazz Ensemble for Willamette Singers’ CD “Love, My Old Friend”, 2015 DownBeat Magazine Student Music Awards, June 2015
- Faculty Mentor, Best Large Undergraduate Vocal Jazz Ensemble for Willamette Singers’ CD “Green Garden”, 2017 DownBeat Magazine Student Music Awards, June 2017
- Salem Distinguished Service Award, Salem Area Chamber of Commerce, March 2020
- Faculty Mentor, Best Large Undergraduate Vocal Jazz Ensemble for Willamette Singers’ CD “Black Magic”, 2021 DownBeat Magazine Student Music Awards, June 2021

== Discography ==
=== Willamette Singers ===
- Magic (Salem, Or.: Willamette University, Dept. of Music, [1998]) [Willamette Singers 1997-98]
- Too Close to the Sun [Willamette Singers 2000-2001]
- Dancing on the Sea [Willamette Singers 2000-2001]
- Where Do You Start? [Willamette Singers 2001-2002]
- New York afternoon ([Salem, Or.]: [Willamette University], 2003) [Willamette Singers 2002-2003]
- Witchcraft [Willamette Singers 2003-2004]
- One Touch of Heaven [Willamette Singers 2004-2005]
- Sea Journey [Willamette Singers 2005-2006]
- Smack Dab in the Middle [Willamette Singers 2006-2007]
- Come Rain or Come Shine [Willamette Singers 2008-2009]
- Move On Over [Willamette Singers 2009-2010]
- Radiance [Willamette Singers 2011-2012]
- I’ll Sing for You [Willamette Singers 2012-13]
- Willamette University Willamette Singers & Mansfield University, The Mansfieldians (Huron, Ohio: Soundwaves, LLC, 2013)
- Love, My Old Friend [Willamette Singers 2013-2014]
- Magnolia [Willamette Singers 2014-2015]
- Green Garden [Willamette Singers 2015-2016]
- First Train Home [Willamette Singers 2016-2017]
- Image on Image [Willamette Singers 2017-2018]
- Black Magic [Willamette Singers 2018-2019]

=== Willamette Chamber Choir ===
- Chamber Choir 2001-2002
- Hope for resolution (Salem, Or.: Willamette University, 2003) [Chamber Choir 2002-2003]
- Thula Sizwe [Chamber Choir 2003-2004]
- In the Heart of the World [Chamber Choir 2004-2006]
- The New Moon [Chamber Choir 2006-2010]
- Stars [Chamber Choir 2010-2015]

=== Male Ensemble Northwest ===
- Reflections of Christmas (Puyallup, WA: [Male Ensemble Northwest], 1997)
- A tribute to Norman Luboff (Puyallup, Wash.: Male Ensemble Northwest; Olympia, Wash. : [Recorded by] The Sounds Preservers Co., 1999)

=== Other ===
- Nine concerts, eight days ([Salem, Or.] : Willamette University, 2000) [Multiple ensembles]
- Handel's Messiah ([Yakima, Wash.]: Yakima Symphony Chorus, 2001) [As bass soloist]
- 2018 Texas Music Educators Association Clinic/Convention. TTCCDA All-State Choir (Clarence, NY : Mark Records, 2018) [As guest conductor]
