= Missa Sancti Bernardi von Offida =

Mass by Joseph Haydn

- Mass by Joseph Haydn
- The composer in 1791, Portrait by Thomas Hardy
- Other name: Heiligmesse,
- Key: B♭ major
- Catalogue: Hob. XXII/10
- Performed: 26 December 1796: Vienna
- Vocal: SATB choir and soloists
- Instrumental: orchestra

The Missa Sancti Bernardi von Offida is a mass in B♭ major by Joseph Haydn, Hob. XXII:10, Novello 1, was written the same year as the Missa in tempore belli (1796), and it "may have been the first mass Haydn wrote after his return from England." Yet it may also have been the second. It is usually given as Haydn's ninth setting of the mass, though its Hoboken number is XXII:10. This mass was written in honor of Bl. Bernard of Offida, a Capuchin who devoted himself to helping the poor; a century after the friar's death, he was beatified by Pope Pius VI.

Scored for four soloists, choir, 2 oboes, clarinets (a later revision expanded their part), 2 bassoons, 2 trumpets in B♭, timpani, strings and organ, the latter supplying figured bass for most of the duration.

The setting is divided into six movements.

1. Kyrie Adagio - Allegro moderato, B♭ major, 3/4
2. Gloria Vivace, B♭ major, common time
  "Gratias agimus tibi" Allegretto, G minor, 3/4
  "Qui tollis peccata mundi" Più allegro, G minor, 3/4
  "Quoniam tu solus sanctus" Vivace, common time
3. Credo Allegro, B♭ major, cut time
  "Et incarnatus est" Adagio, E♭ major, 3/4
  "Et resurrexit" Allegro, B♭ major, 3/4
  "Et vitam venturi" Vivace assai, B♭ major, 3/4
4. Sanctus Adagio, B♭ major, cut time
  "Pleni sunt coeli" Allegro, B♭ major, 3/4
5. Benedictus Moderato, E♭ major, 2/4
6. Agnus Dei Adagio, B♭ minor, 3/4
  "Dona nobis pacem" Allegro, B♭ major, 3/4

The Sanctus section of the mass is a setting of a then-popular Austrian tune to the German translation of Sanctus, "Heilig". The Mass takes its popular German title Heiligmesse from this section. The mass includes what are, for the time, unexpected modulations and innovative use of third relations that would influence later mass settings by nineteenth-century composers. The Quoniam in Anton Bruckner's Missa Solemnis in B♭ minor quotes this mass.

== See also ==
- Bernard of Offida
