= Bergkirche (Eisenstadt) =

Church in Eisenstadt, Austria

Coordinates: 47°50′42″N 16°30′43″E

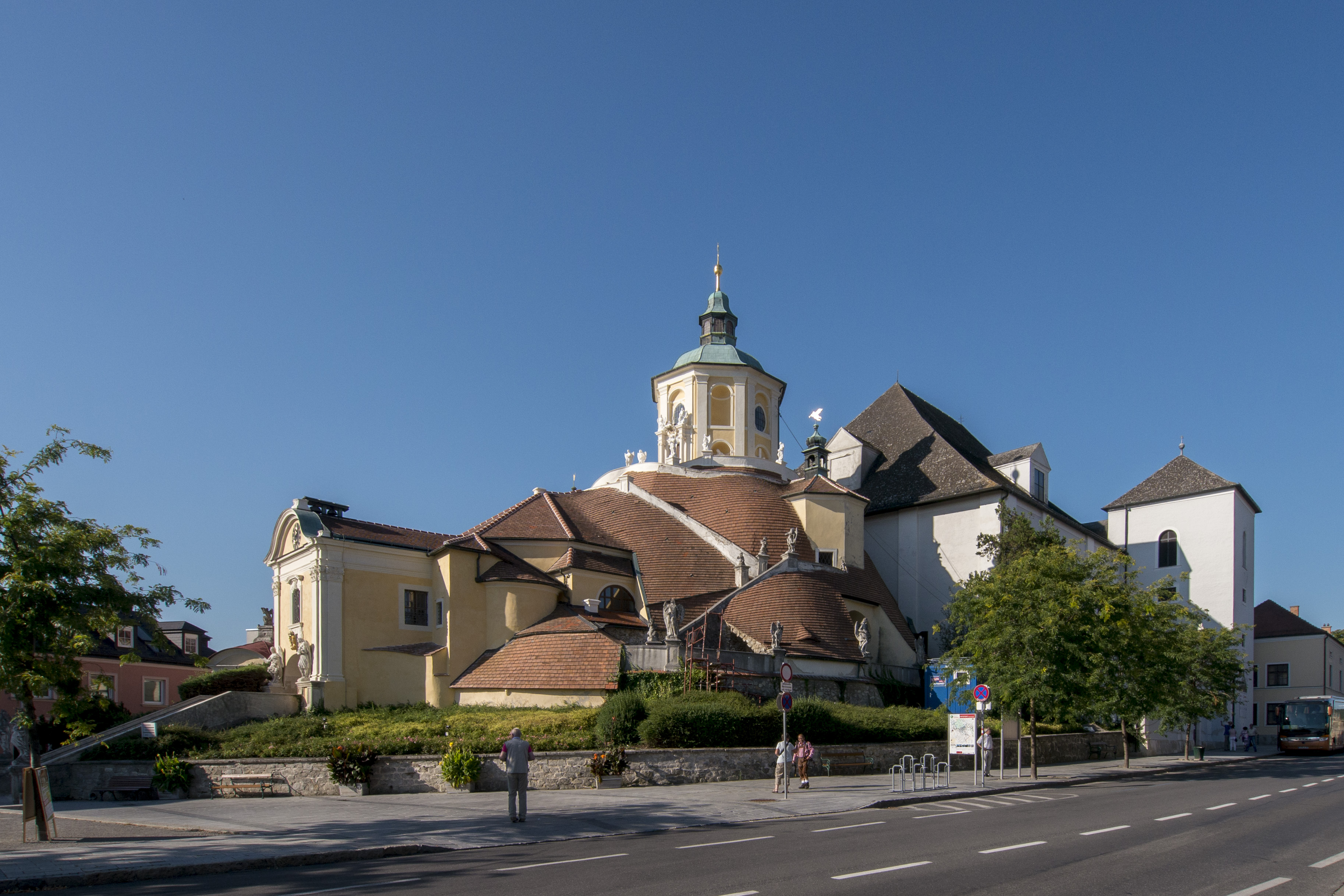
Exterior view with the Kalvarienberg in the foreground

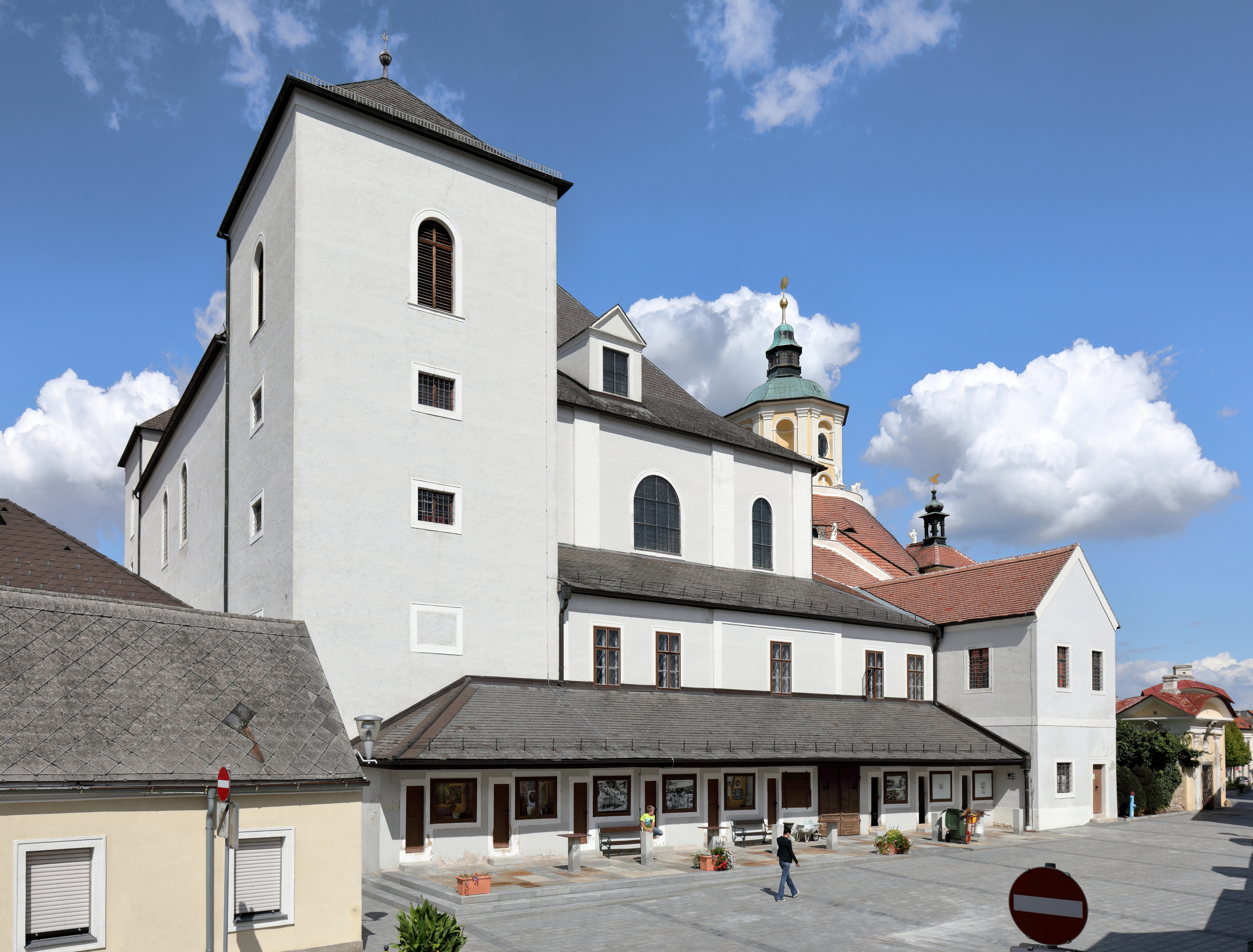
Southside of the church

The Bergkirche ("hill church") is a church in Eisenstadt, the capital of the state of Burgenland in Austria. The church (of Catholic denomination) was built in the early 18th century by Prince Paul Esterházy. Eisenstadt was the seat of the Esterházy family, and the church lies just a short walk to the west of the family's main palace.

== Form ==
The Bergkirche is architecturally unusual and is built in two parts. The main section, the church proper, is approximately a square. The interior is in Baroque style; Humphreys and Bousfield call it "a trompe-l'œil fantasy in pinks and greys". The ceiling takes the form of a dome, which was painted in fresco in the late 18th century by J. W. Baumgartner.

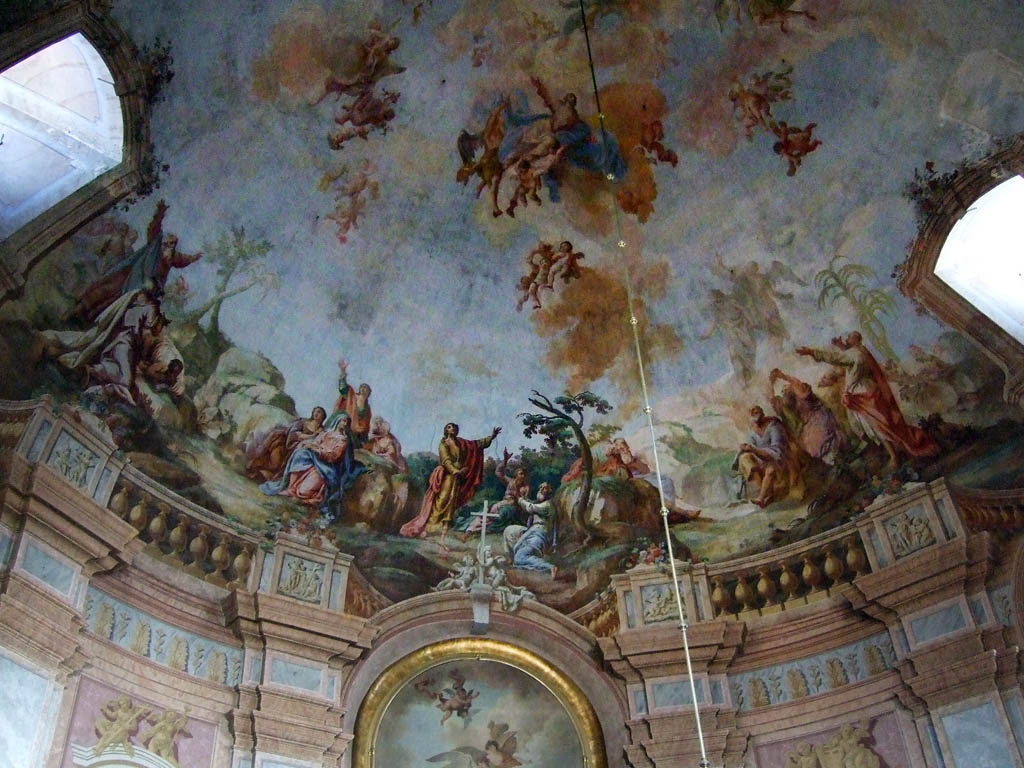
Interior view of the dome of main church building

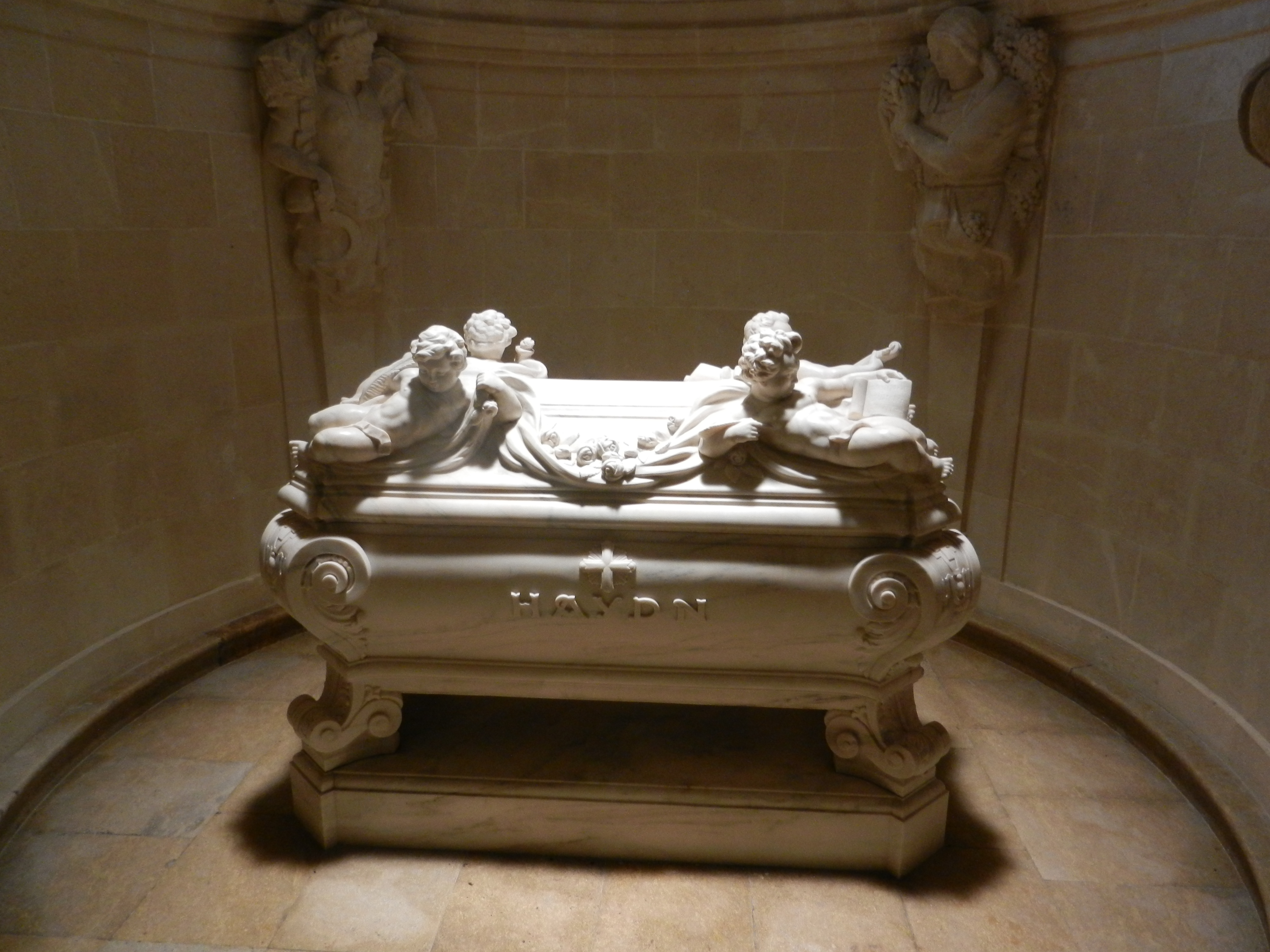
Haydn's tomb

A side chapel is dominated by a large marble sarcophagus, the tomb of the composer Joseph Haydn, who spent much of his career in Eisenstadt working for the Esterházys. The remains of most of Haydn's body have rested here since 1932; the skull was added (with due pomp and ceremony) only in 1954; for the reason for the disparity see Haydn's head.

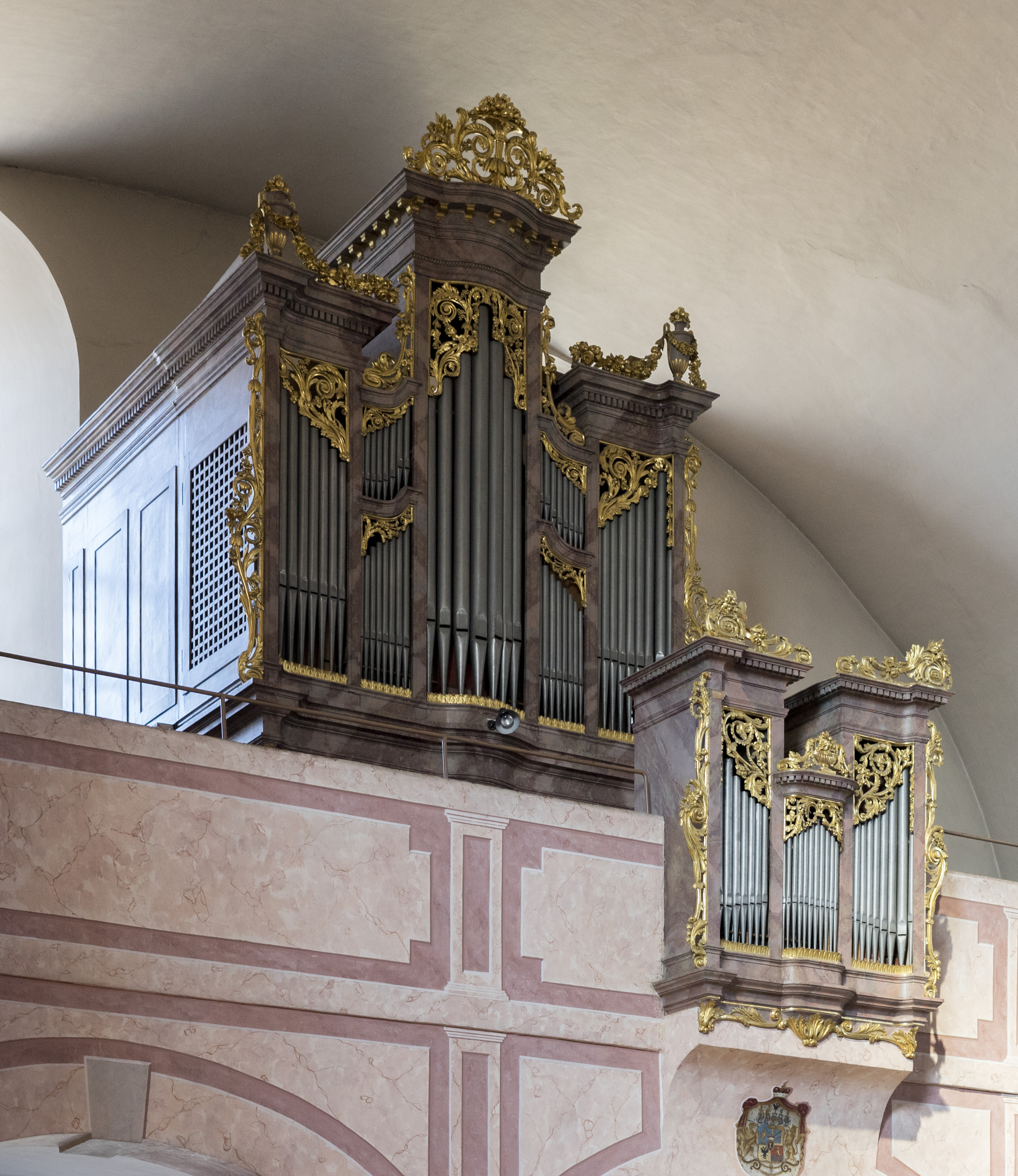
View of the organ

The church still possesses its original organ, built in the 18th century by the Viennese maker Gottfried Malleck; the instrument has been restored to its original state, as it was when it was played by Haydn and Beethoven at the premieres of famous works (see below). The original console, however, is no longer used but resides now in the nearby Haydn Museum.

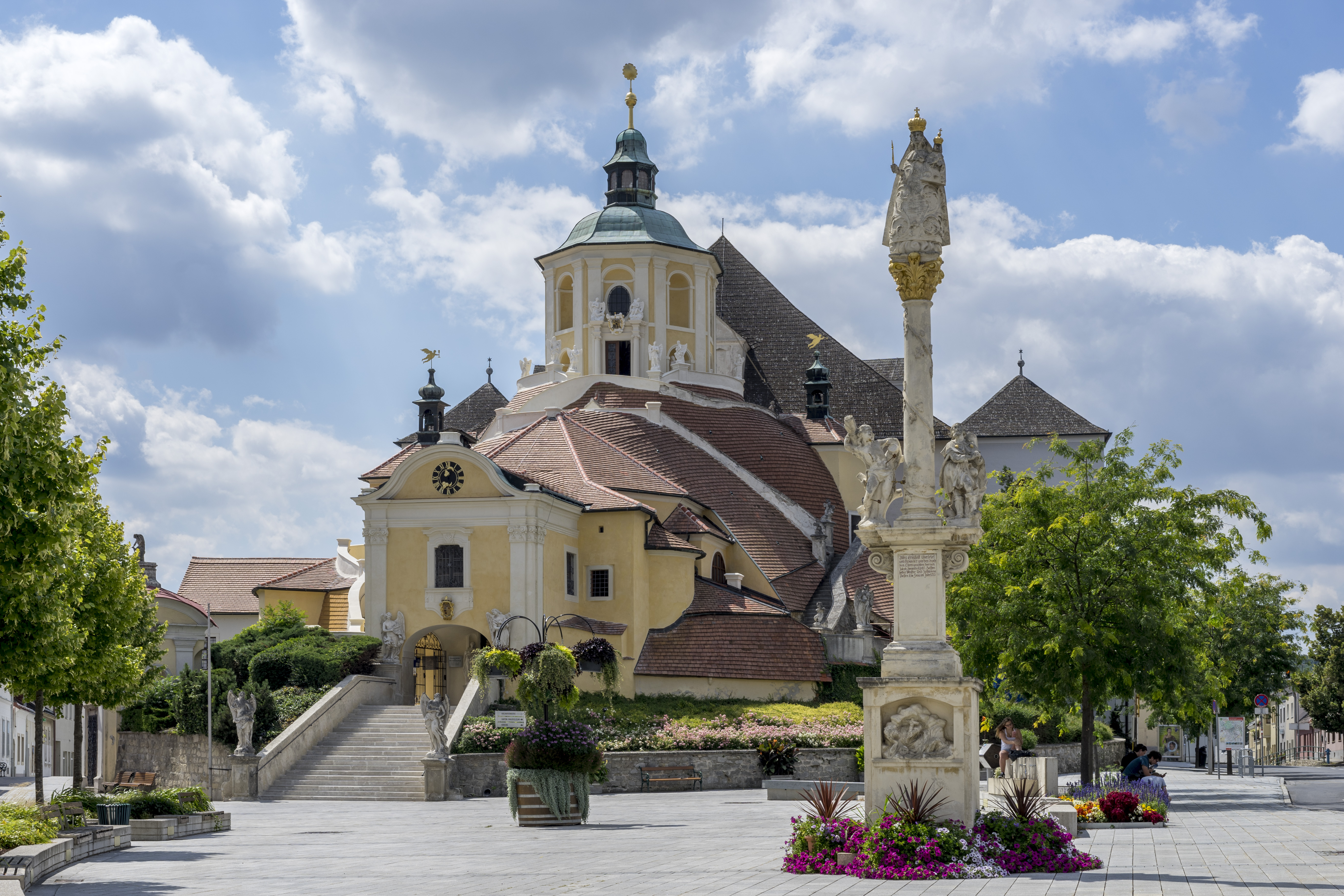
View of the Kalvarienberg entrance and a Saint Mary column

To the east of the main church is a kind of artificial mountain, the "Kalvarienberg" (Calvary Hill), which is filled with passages and grottoes, in which appear statuary depicting the 24 Stations of the Cross. The statues, which are "vividly, even garishly painted" (Jones 2009:51) were the work of Franciscan friars, working over 250 years ago. In historical times the Kalvarienberg was a destination for pilgrimages; according to Jones, in its time the Kalvarienberg "was regarded as the eighth wonder of the world." As in historical times, visitors climb up and down the little mountain and go within it, viewing the stations in succession.

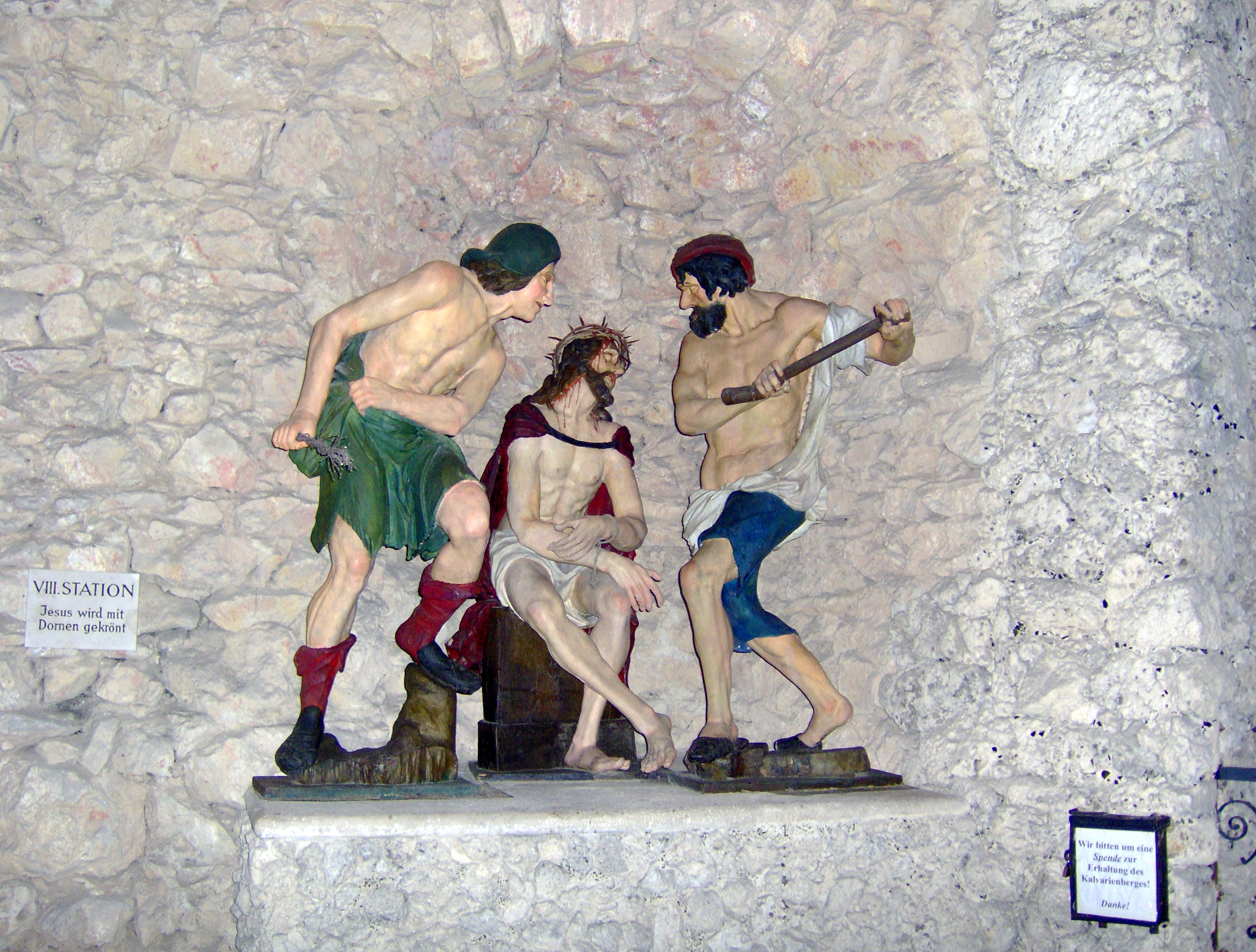
One of the tableaux depicting the Stations of the Cross. The sign on the left reads (in German) "Jesus is crowned with thorns"

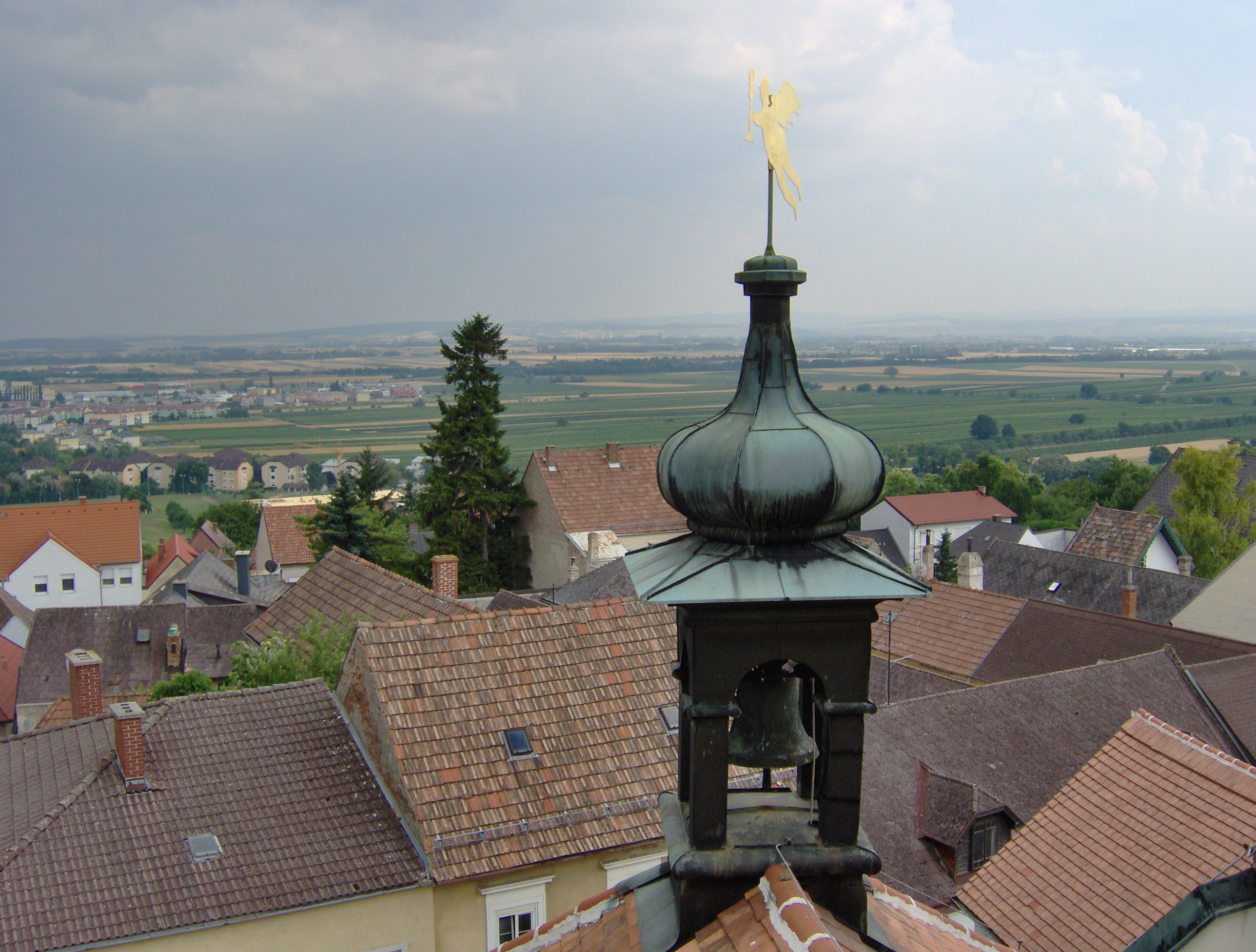
View from the top of the church

The "Berg" of "Bergkirche" could be interpreted in two ways: the church is built on a hill, but made taller by earth added at the time of construction. From the top of the Kalvarienberg route there are scenic views of Eisenstadt and the surrounding countryside.

== Musical history ==
In addition to housing Haydn's tomb, the Bergkirche is notable in the history of music in that it was the scene of the premiere of most of the six late masses that Haydn wrote for his patrons during the final phase of his career. Later, Ludwig van Beethoven led the (unsuccessful) 1807 premiere of his Mass in C (again a commission from the Esterházys) in the church.

According to McGrann, the masses written for performance in the church were only a part of dazzling celebrations put on by the Esterházy family under its head at the time, Nicolaus II:

A typical celebration [would include] a concerted mass, vespers, a lavish banquet and ball, Turkish music on the square for the townsfolk, extensive illuminations, and a fireworks display. ... Even the short journey [0.5 km.] from the palace to the Bergkirche, where Mass was normally held, could be impressive. [Court functionary Joseph Carl] Rosenbaum mentions ten coaches making their way in 1804; and a visitor to Eisenstadt in 1816 reported second-hand stories about the prince's somewhat unusual entrance into the church: "The Prince used to go to church surrounded by his guard. He rode on horseback through the church, to the door of his tribune, where he sat in solitary grandeur. The Princess also sat alone in her tribune opposite. The offices of the guard occupied another, and the visitors had another to themselves." Accompanying many of the events were the roar of cannons ... reflecting the power and strength of this magnate of Hungary.

In light of its importance for music history, Moses et al. size up the acoustic properties of the church: its many hard surfaces and its high dome result in an echo time they estimate at 4 1/2 to 5 1/2 seconds. The authors go on to emphasize performance styles (emphasizing lightness and the detachment of notes) appropriate for Haydn's music, especially in such venues.
