= Missa Cellensis in honorem Beatissimae Virginis Mariae =

Mass by Joseph Haydn

Missa Cellensis
- Mass by Joseph Haydn
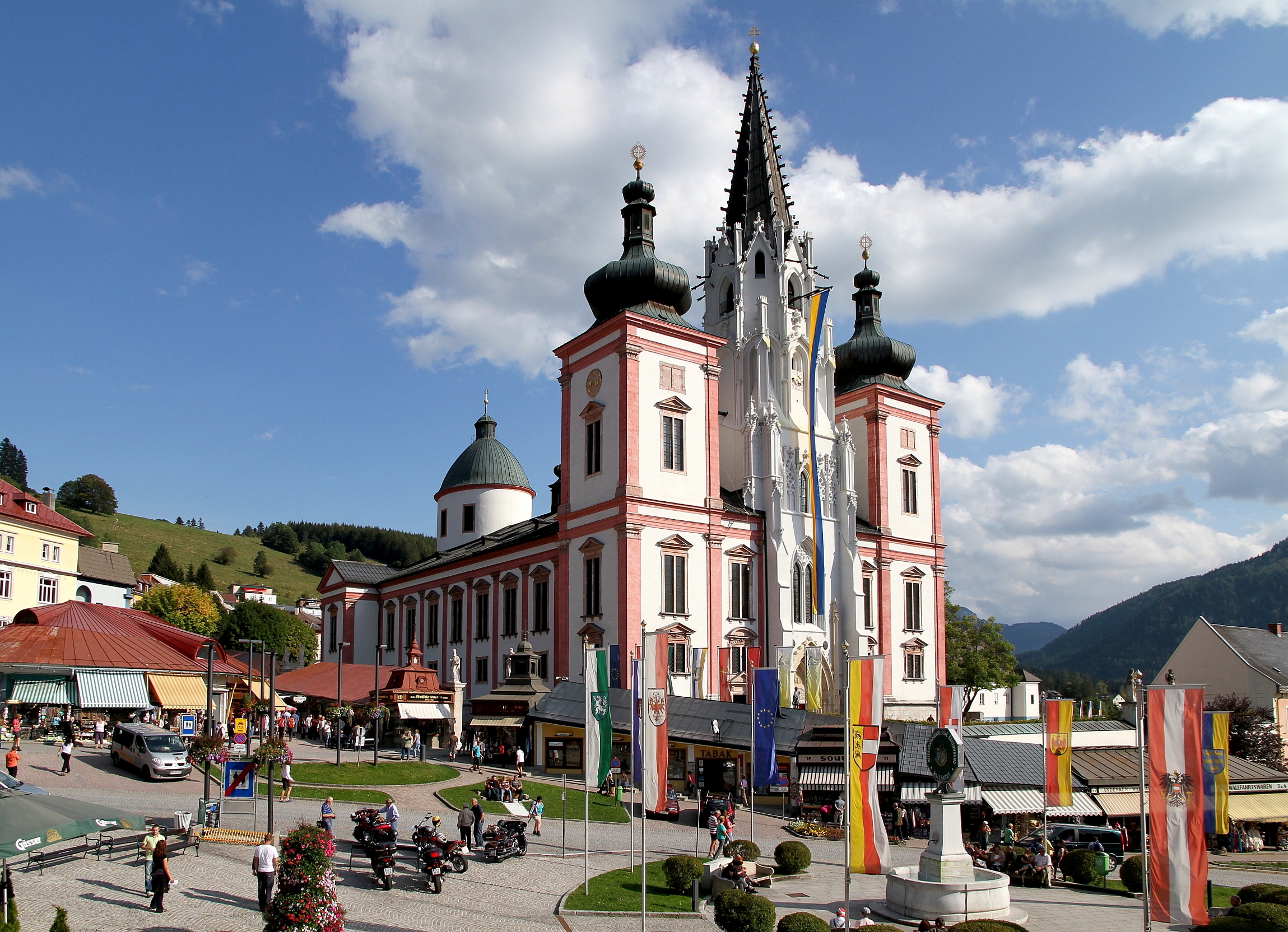
- Mariazell Basilica
- Other name: Missa Cellensis in honorem Beatissimae Virginis Mariae; Cäcilienmesse
- Key: C major
- Catalogue: Hob. XXII:5
- Composed: 1766
- Dedication: Pilgrimage of Mariazell, Styria
- Movements: 6
- Vocal: SATB choir and solo
- Instrumental: orchestra

The Missa Cellensis in honorem Beatissimae Virginis Mariae in C major by Joseph Haydn, Hob. XXII:5, Novello 3, was originally written in 1766, after Haydn was promoted to Kapellmeister at Eszterháza following the death of Gregor Joseph Werner. The original title as it appears on the only surviving fragment of Haydn's autograph score, that has been discovered around 1970 in Budapest, clearly assigns the mass to the pilgrimage cult of Mariazell, Styria. Until that discovery, the work was known as Missa Sanctae Caeciliae, or in German Cäcilienmesse, a title probably attributed to the mass in the 19th century. Whether the alternative title refers to a performance of the piece by the St. Cecilia's Congregation, a Viennese musician's fraternity, on some St. Cecilia's day (22 November), as has been suggested, remains speculation.

It is believed that the original manuscript was lost in the Eisenstadt fire of 1768, and that when Haydn rewrote the piece from memory, he may also have expanded it. It may have originally consisted of only Kyrie and Gloria, with the other parts added later. This Mass was known to Anton Bruckner.

The mass is scored for vocal soloists, SATB choir, 2 oboes, 2 bassoons, 2 trumpets in C, timpani, strings and organ, the latter supplying figured bass for most of the duration.

The setting is divided into six movements.

1. Kyrie Adagio (ossia Largo), C major, common time
  "Kyrie eleison" Allegro con spirito, C major, common time
  "Christe eleison" Allegretto, A minor, 3/4
  "Kyrie eleison" Vivace, C major, common time
2. Gloria Allegro di molto, C major, 3/4
  "Laudamus te, benedicimus te" Moderato, G major, common time
  "Gratias agimus" Alla breve, E minor, cut time
  "Domine Deus, Rex coelestis" Allegro, C major, 3/8
  "Qui tollis peccata mundi" Adagio, C minor, common time
  "Quoniam tu solus sanctus" Allegro di molto, C major, common time
  "Cum Sancto spiritu" Largo, C major, common time
  "In gloria Dei Patris" Allegro con spirito, C major, common time
3. Credo Vivace, C major, common time
  "Et incarnatus est" Largo, C minor, common time
  "Et resurrexit" Allegro, C major, 3/4
4. Sanctus Adagio, C major, common time
5. Benedictus Andante, C minor, cut time
  "Osanna" Allegro, C major, common time
6. Agnus Dei Largo, A minor, common time
  "Dona nobis pacem" Presto, C major, 3/4

While Jonathan Green finds the choral parts to be of medium difficulty, he finds the orchestral parts quite difficult, and recommends seasoned, "technically secure" players.
