= Piarist Church, Vienna =

Church in Vienna, Austria

Piarist Church
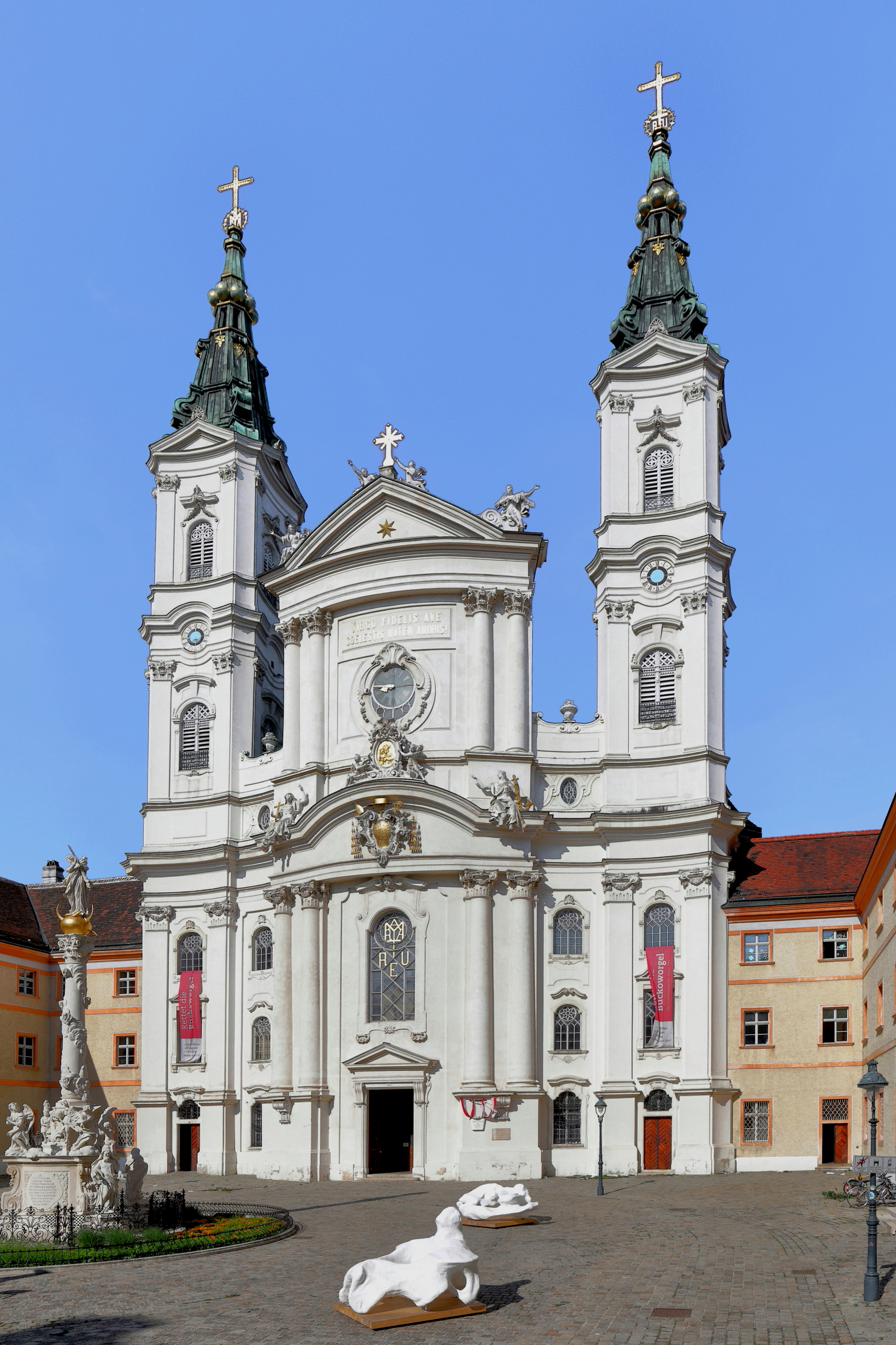
- Piarist Church in Vienna

- Location within Vienna Location within Austria

Religion
- Affiliation: Catholic Church
- Leadership: P. Miroslaw Baranski SP
- Year consecrated: 1719

Location
- Location: Vienna, Austria
- Coordinates: 48.2105°N 16.3492°E

Architecture
- Architects: Johann Lukas von Hildebrandt, Mathias Gerl
- Type: Church
- Style: Baroque
- Groundbreaking: 1698
- Completed: 1753

Specifications
- Direction of façade: NE
- Length: 55 m (180 ft)
- Width: 40 m (130 ft)
- Width (nave): 15 m
- Height (max): 42,8m

Website
- www.mariatreu.at

The Piarist Church, also known as the Church of Maria Treu, is a Baroque parish church of the Order of the Piarists (Patres Scholarum Piarum) in Vienna, Austria. It is located in Vienna's 8th district (Josefstadt). The Piaristenkirche was elevated to the rank of Basilica Minor in 1949.

The right tower has an approximate height of 42.8m as measured and calculated by the 5C class of the Piaristengymnasium in the school year of 2021/2022.

== Interior ==
The church has six chapels and is decorated with frescoes made by Franz Anton Maulbertsch in 1752–53.

== Trivia ==
Commissioned by the Piarists, Haydn's Missa in Tempore Belli (Mass in Time of War, sometimes known as the Paukenmesse or Kettledrum Mass) was first performed on 26 December 1796.
