= Missa brevis Sancti Joannis de Deo =

1775 mass by Joseph Haydn

- Mass by Joseph Haydn
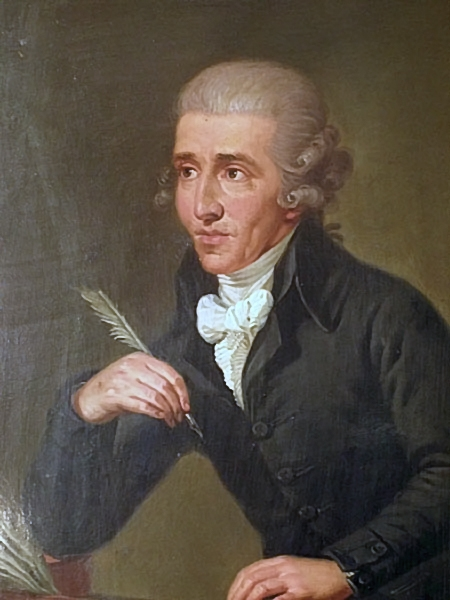
- Haydn c. 1770, Portrait by Ludwig Guttenbrunn
- Other name: Little Organ Mass
- Key: B♭ major
- Catalogue: Hob. XXII:7
- Composed: 1774
- Movements: 6
- Vocal: SATB choir; soprano solo
- Instrumental: 2 violins; organ; bass

The Missa brevis Sancti Joannis de Deo, Hob. XXII:7, Novello 8, is a mass in B♭ major by Joseph Haydn. The missa brevis (short mass) was written around 1775 for the order of the Barmherzige Brüder (Brothers Hospitallers) in Eisenstadt, whose patron saint was John of God. Scored modestly for soprano, four-part mixed choir, two violins, organ and bass, it is known as the Kleine Orgelmesse (Little Organ Mass) due to an extended organ solo in the Benedictus movement which also includes the only featured solo voice - a soprano.

== History ==
Haydn composed four or five short masses, depending on the Missa brevis Rorate coeli desuper being composed by him or not. The Missa brevis Sancti Joannis de Deo is his last missa brevis. All these short masses share a modest orchestra.

The mass was written for the order of the Barmherzige Brüder, also called Brothers of Mercy, in Eisenstadt, Kingdom of Hungary (now Austria), whose founder and patron saint was St. John of God. Haydn lived in Eisenstadt, working for the court of Nikolaus II, Prince Esterházy. The composition was written in 1774. Because of an extensive organ solo in the Benedictus, it is known as the Kleine Orgelmesse (Little Organ Mass), referring to the Große Orgelsolomesse (Great Organ Mass), a colloquial name for the Missa in honorem Beatissimae Virginis Mariae in E♭ major, Haydn's fourth mass. An organ solo in the Benedictus was common practice at the time.

Haydn played the organ in the first performance, in the hospital chapel of the Brethren in Eisenstadt. "Kleine" (little) may refer to the organ as well as to the composition, because the instrument there was a positive with six stops without pedal.

== Scoring and structure ==
The setting of the Latin mass is structured in six movements. It was originally scored for a solo soprano, a four-part choir (SATB), the so-called Wiener Kirchentrio (Vienna church trio) of two violins and bass, with an organ which has a solo function in the Benedictus.

In the following table of the movements, the voices, markings, keys and time signatures are taken from the choral score.

No.	Part	Incipit	Vocal	Marking	Key	Time
1	Kyrie	Kyrie	SATB	Adagio	B♭ major	common time
2	Gloria	Gloria	SATB	Allegro molto	B♭ major	3/4
3	Credo	Credo	SATB	Allegro	B♭ major	common time
3	Credo	Et incarnatus est	SATB	Adagio	B♭ major	3/4
3	Credo	Et resurrexit	SATB	Allegro	B♭ major	3/4
4	Sanctus	Sanctus	SATB	Allegro	B♭ major	6/8
5	Benedictus	Benedictus	Soprano	Moderato	E♭ major	common time
5	Benedictus	Osanna	SATB	Allegro	B♭ major	6/8
6	Agnus Dei	Agnus Dei	SATB	Adagio	B♭ major	3/4

== Music ==
The movements Gloria and Credo are kept extremely short by the technique of polytexture (polytextual music: "several clauses of the text [are set] simultaneously in different voices.") The texts from the order of mass are repeated in every mass and thus well known. The setting of different passages assigned to the different parts, heard simultaneously, does justice to the liturgy but keeps the music short. This setting does, however, take this practice to the extreme, by omitting the words "Et in unum Dominum, Iesum Christum, Filium Dei unigenitum" ("And in one Lord, Jesus Christ, the only-begotten Son of God") from the Credo. The Benedictus is the only movement which is not in B♭ major, and set for a solo voice.

=== Kyrie ===
The Kyrie shows, according to the musicologist John Hsu "brilliant instrumental idioms and choral declamation.

=== Credo ===
The Credo is structured in three parts, the center being formed by an Adagio for the birth, suffering and death of Jesus, delivered by the choir mostly in homophony, accompanied by broken chords in the violins and repetition in the bass. The third section recapitulates music from the Gloria.

=== Sanctus ===
Sanctus is called by the voices in a fast sequence of entries, some as bell-like long notes, other in flowing triplets. For the Osanna, the voices enter from the lowest to the highest, only one measure apart. The instruments play colla parte with the voices, violins with soprano and alto, cello and violone with the bass.

=== Benedictus ===
The Benedictus, the longest movement, is a dialogue of soprano soloist and organ, described as "expressive, elegant, and ornate melodic lines". It is followed by a repeat of the Osanna.

=== Agnus Dei ===
Haydn marked the Agnus Dei carefully for dramatic contrast in dynamics, setting "Agnus Dei" (Lamb of God) as a fortissimo homophonic call versus a pianissimo prayer "Dona nobis pacem" (Give us peace). The end is marked "perdendosi, senza organo" (dying away, without organ), with a pizzicato bass.

A reviewer of the Oxford edition summarized: "The work is accessible to most choirs. The music is not excessively difficult, but the solid musical structure and the many passages requiring expressive singing make the work a rewarding pleasure for any size choir. Renowned Haydn specialist H. C. Robbins Landon, who edited a modern edition of the mass (published by Henle-Verlag in 1958), ascribed to the work a "quiet spirit of devotion, even of mysticism, that is most appealing".

== Versions ==
While the mass was originally scored for choir, strings and organ, later versions include with trumpets and timpani, and clarinets.

The mass was also used in Salzburg where the textual compression was deemed "unacceptable", therefore the composer's brother Michael Haydn expanded the Gloria, from 31 measures to 118. Very few performances however, use this expansion. However, the Oxford edition presents Michael Haydn's prolongation in the main body of the text and Joseph's short original as an appendix. Johann Georg Albrechtsberger wrote an alternate Benedictus.
