= List of Masses by Joseph Haydn =

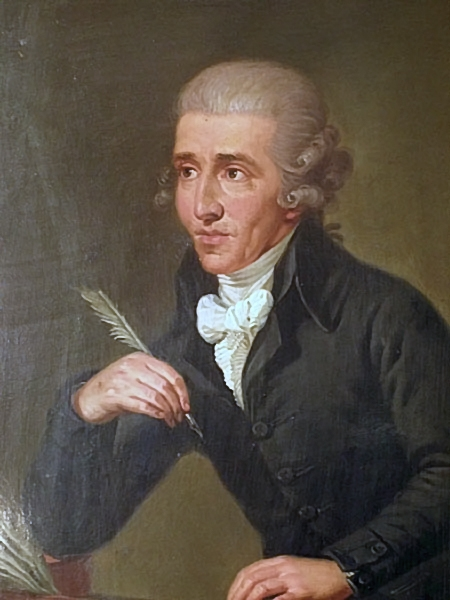
Portrait by Ludwig Guttenbrunn, painted c. 1791–92, depicts Haydn c. 1770

This is a list of masses by Joseph Haydn. Masses are sorted using chronological indices given by New Grove. The Hoboken catalogue had also placed the masses in presumed chronological order, but further research has undermined that sequence.

- No. 1 in G major: 'Missa rorate coeli desuper' (H. 22/3) (c.1750)
- No. 2 in F major: 'Missa brevis' (H. 22/1) (1750)
- No. 3 in C major: 'Missa Cellensis in honorem Beatissimae Virginis Mariae', also spuriously known as 'Cäcilienmesse' (St Cecilia) (H. 22/5) (1766–73)
- No. 4 in D minor: 'Missa sunt bona mixta malis' (H. 22/2) (1768; Fragment)
- No. 5 in E♭ major: 'Missa in honorem Beatissimae Virginis Mariae', also known as the 'Große Orgelmesse' ('Great Organ Mass') (H. 22/4) (1770)
- No. 6 in G major: 'Missa Sancti Nicolai, Nicolaimesse' (H. 22/6) (1772)
- No. 7 in B♭ major: 'Missa brevis Sancti Joannis de Deo', also known as the 'Kleine Orgelmesse' ('Little Organ Mass') (H. 22/7) (c.1775)
- No. 8 in C major: 'Missa Cellensis, Mariazellermesse' (H. 22/8) (1782)

Masses nos. 9–14 form a group: each was composed by Haydn on commission from the Esterházy family; although it is sometimes asserted that all six were written to celebrate the name day (12 September) of Princess Maria Hermenegild, the wife of Prince Nikolaus II and a friend of the composer, there is in fact direct evidence of this only for the last three masses. The composition of these masses was Haydn's principal duty to his old employers at this time of his career.

The Heiligmesse in B♭ major, composed for the Capuchin friar Bernard of Offida, is thought to have been performed at the Feast of the Holy Name of Mary on September 11, 1796. The Paukenmesse in C major was first performed on December 26, 1797. Thirdly, the Missa in Angustiis in D minor was performed on September 23, 1798. Fourthly, the Theresienmesse in B♭ major is from 1799, and was written for Maria Theresa of Naples and Sicily. Fifth, the Schöpfungsmesse in B♭ major was performed on September 13, 1801, and features melodies from the Creation, especially in the "Gloria". Sixth, the Harmoniemesse in B♭ major was performed on September 8, 1802, and is almost certainly his last major work.

- No. 9 in B♭ major: 'Missa Sancti Bernardi von Offida', also known as the 'Heiligmesse' (H. 22/10) (1796)
- No. 10 in C major: 'Missa in tempore belli' ('Mass in Time of War'), also known as the 'Paukenmesse' ('Kettledrum Mass') (H. 22/9) (1796)
- No. 11 in D minor: 'Missa in Angustiis' ('Mass in Troubled Times'), also known as the 'Nelson Mass' (H. 22/11) (1798)
- No. 12 in B♭ major: 'Theresienmesse' (named for Maria Theresa of the Two Sicilies) (H. 22/12) (1799)
- No. 13 in B♭ major: 'Schöpfungsmesse' ('Creation Mass') (H. 22/13) (1801)
- No. 14 in B♭ major: 'Harmoniemesse' ('Wind-band Mass') (H. 22/14) (1802).

The Harmoniemesse 1802 was Haydn's last major work. He shortly afterward sank into debilitating illness and was unable to compose further.
