= Schöpfungsmesse =

Mass by Joseph Haydn

Missa
- Schöpfungsmesse
- Mass by Joseph Haydn
- Portrait, 1791
- Key: B♭ major
- Catalogue: Hob. XXII/13
- Composed: 1801
- Vocal: SATB choir and soloists
- Instrumental: Orchestra

The Mass No. 13 in B♭ major, Hob. XXII/13, was composed by Joseph Haydn in 1801. It is known as the Schöpfungsmesse or Creation Mass because of the words "qui tollis peccata mundi" in the Gloria. He recycled music from Adam and Eve's final duet in The Creation, a fact which scandalized Empress Maria Theresa so much that she ordered Haydn to recompose that passage for her own copy.

The recurrent motif in measure 51 of the Gloria is identical to the solo soprano/tenor motif in measure 13 of "Der Herr ist Groß" from Haydn's "Die Schöpfung".

The work was first performed on 13 September 1801. It consists of six movements:

1. Kyrie, Adagio, B♭ major, 3/4
  Kyrie, Allegro moderato, B♭ major, 6/8
2. Gloria, Allegro, B♭ major, alla breve
  Qui tollis, Adagio, E♭ major, 3/4
  Quoniam tu solus sanctus, Molto vivace, B♭ major, common time
  In gloria Dei Patris, Presto, B♭ major, common time
3. Credo, Vivace, B♭ major, common time
  Et incarnatus est, Adagio, G major, 3/4
  Et resurrexit, Allegro, B♭ major, common time
  Et vitam venturi, Più Allegro, B♭ major, common time
4. Sanctus, Adagio, B♭ major, common time
  Pleni sunt coeli, Allegro, B♭ major, common time
5. Benedictus, Allegretto, E♭ major, 6/8
6. Agnus Dei, Adagio, G major, 3/4
  Dona nobis pacem, Allegro moderato, B♭ major, alla breve

The autograph manuscript of the mass is preserved in the Bavarian State Library.
