= Joseph Carl Rosenbaum =

Austrian official, employee of the Esterházy family

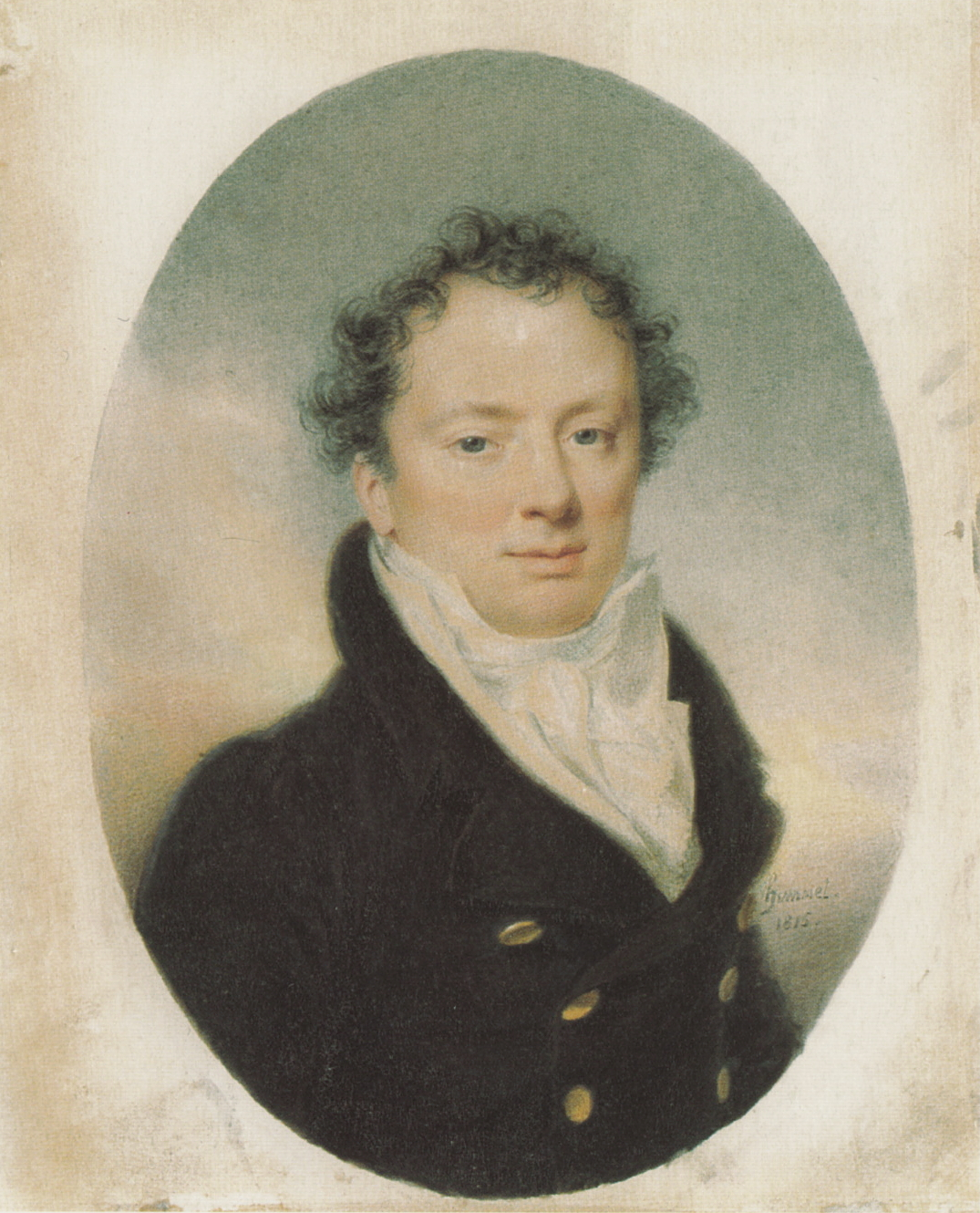
Portrait of Rosenbaum by Carl Ludwig Hummel (1815)

Joseph Carl Rosenbaum (5 July 1770 – 26 December 1829) was an Austrian employee of the Esterházy family, later a private citizen whose house was a centre of Viennese social life.

== Life ==
Rosenbaum was born in Vienna in 1770, son of an official of the Esterházy family. In 1785 he entered the service of Nikolaus II, Prince Esterházy, and in 1797 he came to Vienna as the Prince's stable accountant.

He married in 1800 Therese Gassmann, an opera singer; on his marriage he had to leave his employment, and he then lived in Vienna as a private citizen. In 1816 he purchased a property in the Viennese district of Wieden, and laid out a garden. Through his wife he knew many people in the cultural life of the city, and his house became a centre of Viennese society.

From 1797 until his death he kept a diary, now in the Austrian National Library. It is an important source of information about Joseph Haydn, whom he knew well, and about Viennese theatre and other local affairs.

Rosenbaum was an adherent of Franz Joseph Gall's theory of phrenology, and in 1809 was involved in stealing the head of Joseph Haydn from the composer's grave. It was in his possession until his death.
