= Missa in honorem Beatissimae Virginis Mariae =

Mass written by Joseph Haydn

The Missa in honorem Beatissimae Virginis Mariae (Hob. XXII:4) in E♭ major was written by Joseph Haydn for performance in Esterhaza in 1770. It was part of Haydn's duties to compose musical masses. It contains smaller organ obliggato, in contrast to the Kleine Organ Mass, or Missa brevis Sancti Joannis de Deo. It is known as the Gross Orgelsolo Mass in German speaking lands.

== Description ==
The large-scale, virtuoso organ part that Haydn himself performed during the original performance was remarkable. In this work, the organ not only has an attractively figured obligatory part in Benedictus (as in other organ solo fairs of the era), but at least in sections in all other movements with the exception of the Sanctus.
