= Bernard of Offida =

17th-century Beatified Italian friar

Blessed Bernard of Offida O.F.M.
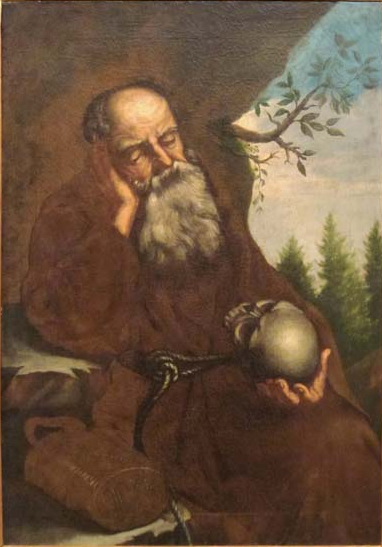
- Blessed Bernard of Offida.

Religious
- Born: 7 November 1604; Appignano, Papal States
- Died: 22 August 1694 (aged 89); Offida, Papal States
- Venerated in: Roman Catholic Church
- Beatified: 25 May 1795, Saint Peter's Basilica, Papal States by Pope Pius VI
- Feast: 22 August; 23 August (Offida & O.F.M.)
- Attributes: Franciscan habit; Skull
- Patronage: Offida

Bernard of Offida (7 November 1604 – 22 August 1694) - born Domenico Peroni - was an Italian Roman Catholic professed religious from the Order of Friars Minor Capuchin from the Marche area. Peroni lived for the most part in servitude to his fellow friars in various capacities and he was noted for his strong Eucharistic dedication and for his holiness.

Peroni was beatified in mid-1795.

== Life ==
Domenico Peroni was born 7 November 1604 to the peasants Domenico Peroni and Elisabetta Puccio as the third of eight children. His mother often held him up as an example to his other siblings. At his baptism he was given the names of "Domenico Francesco".

He served as a shepherd in his childhood. Peroni entered the Order of Friars Minor Capuchin in Corinaldo in 1626. From his entrance until 1633 he worked in the kitchen under the direction of Maximus and he liked to often immerse himself in Sacred Scripture and fostered an ardent devotion to the Eucharist. He often scourged himself as a penitential act.

He was at Fermo from his profession until two decades later and settled in 1650 in Offida for the remainder of his life where he later died on 22 August 1694 mere months before turning 90. He died from a high fever and erysipelas with a Crucifix in his hands. Joseph Haydn wrote a special Mass in his honor dubbed the "Missa sancti Bernardi von Offida".

=== Beatification ===
Pope Pius VI held the beatification celebration for Bernard on 25 May 1795 in Saint Peter's Basilica. The cause for his sainthood was formally opened on 20 September 1797.

== See also ==
- Missa Sancti Bernardi von Offida.

== Sources ==
- Delaney (2005) John. New York Dictionary of Saints Random House
- Heartz (2009) Daniel. New York. Mozart, Haydn and Early Beethoven: 1781 — 1802 W. W. Norton & Co.
- Carmelo Randello, ‘Beato Bernardo da Offida’, Santi, beati e testimoni, 2001.
- Walsh (2007) Michael. New York A New Dictionary of Saints: East and West Liturgical Press
