= Carl Ludwig Hummel =

Austrian painter and lithographer (c. 1769–1840)

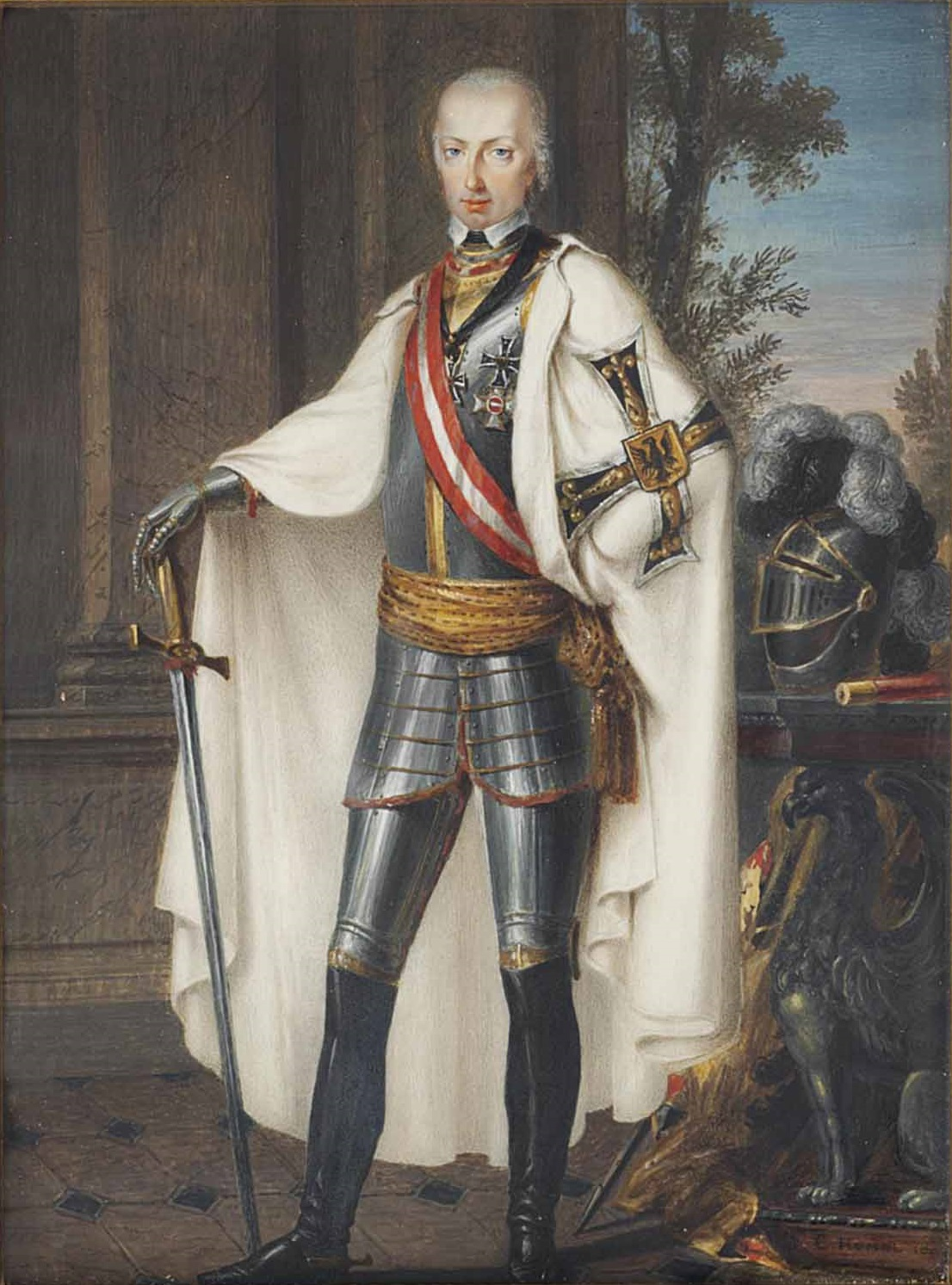
Archduke Charles, Duke of Teschen

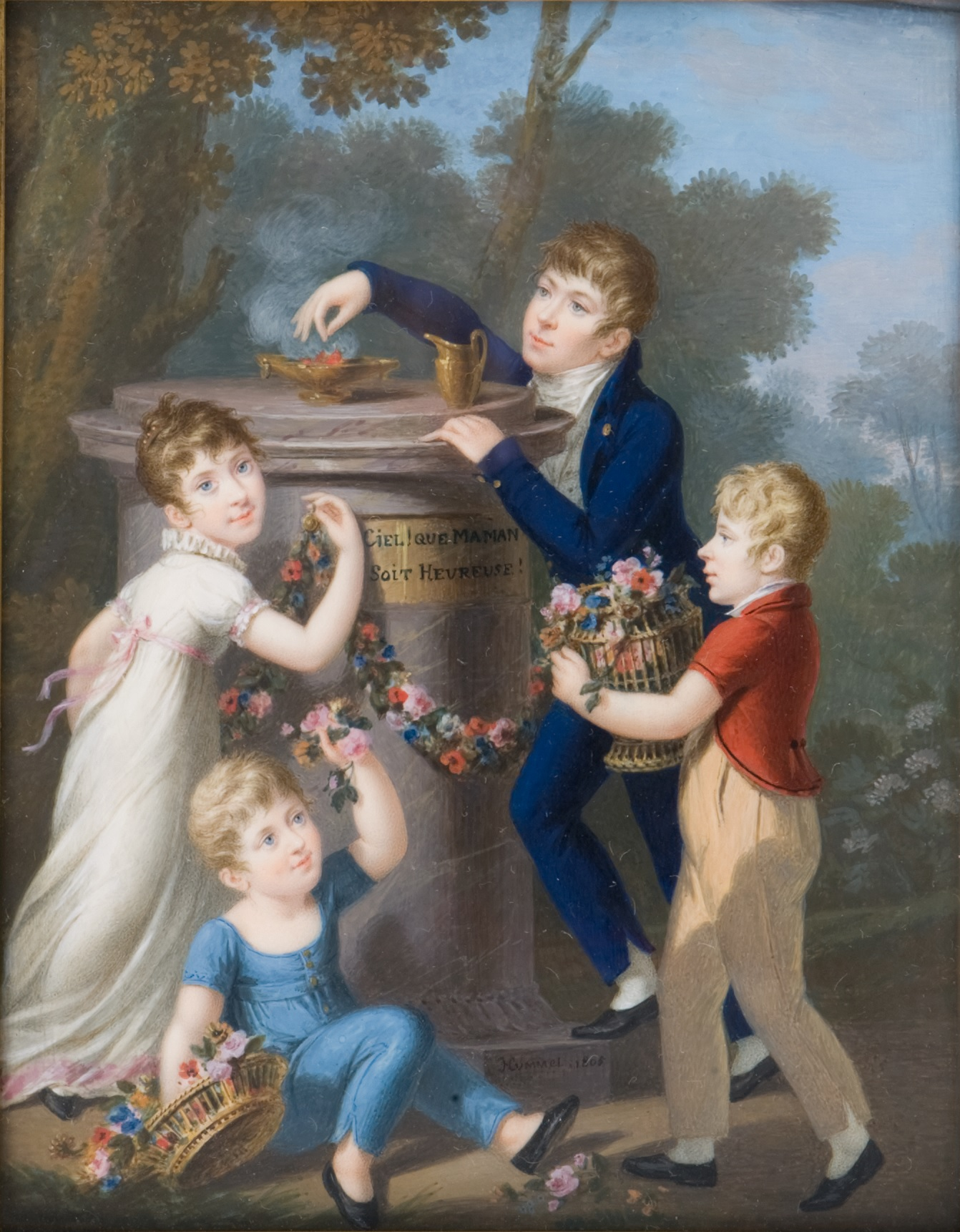
The Children of Count Antoni Józef Lanckoroński

Carl Ludwig Hummel, also known as Carl Ludwig Hummel de Bourdon; born Charles de Bourdon (c. 1769, Besançon – 23 April 1840, Vienna) was a French-born Austrian portrait painter who specialized in miniatures.

== Biography ==
He probably fled France in 1793/94, during the Reign of Terror, and settled in Bern, Switzerland. Later, he entered the service of the Tsar's daughter, Grand Duchess Alexandra Pavlovna, who had married Archduke Joseph of Austria, and relocated to Vienna.

At that time, he changed his name to "Hummel", the German equivalent of "Bourdon" (bumblebee). In 1800, he married Louise Aglaé Quidor de Perez, daughter of a former Parisian police inspector, Étienne-François Quidor, who was under the protection of Count Johann Anton von Pergen.

In 1801 the Grand Duchess died, aged only seventeen. After a few years of increasing financial issues, he joined with the architect, Charles de Moreau, acquired some property in Leopoldstadt, and built the "Dianabad", a bathhouse for the upper classes which, at various times, also served as a hotel. It had its grand opening in 1810. Hummel would live there for the rest of his life, and enjoyed a steady income he could depend on, apart from his painting.

His best known portraits are those of the nobility, including Prince Ferdinand von Kinsky, Count Ferdinánd Pálffy and Count Johann Rudolf Czernin. During the Congress of Vienna, he created miniatures for many of the participants.

In his later years, he became an art appraiser. His signature may be found at the end of the catalog devoted to the art collection of Josephine Brunsvik (1821).

He died at the age of seventy-one and was interred at the Sankt Marxer Friedhof. His son, Eugen also became a portrait painter.
