= Missa Sancti Nicolai =

Mass by Joseph Haydn

- Mass by Joseph Haydn
- Key: G major
- Catalogue: Hob. XXII/6
- Composed: 1772
- Vocal: SATB choir and soloists
- Instrumental: orchestra

Missa Sancti Nicolai, Mass No. 6 in G major, Hob. XXII/6, also known as the Nicolaimesse, is a mass by Joseph Haydn, composed around 1772 and revised in 1802.

The work is scored for SATB soloists and choir, two oboes, two horns, strings, and organ. The revision added trumpets and timpani.

Like most Austrian masses, the work consists of six movements:

1. Kyrie Allegretto, G major, 6/4
2. Gloria Vivace, G major, common time
  "Quoniam tu solus sanctus" Allegro, common time
3. Credo Allegro, G major, 3/4
  "Et incarnatus est" Adagio, G minor, common time
  "Et resurrexit" Allegro, G major, 3/4
4. Sanctus Adagio, G major, common time
  "Pleni sunt coeli" Allegro, G major, 3/4
5. Benedictus Moderato, D major, common time
  "Osanna in excelsis" Allegro, G major, 3/4
6. Agnus Dei Adagio, G minor, 3/4
  "Dona nobis pacem" Allegretto, G major, 6/4
