= Therese Rosenbaum =

Austrian opera singer

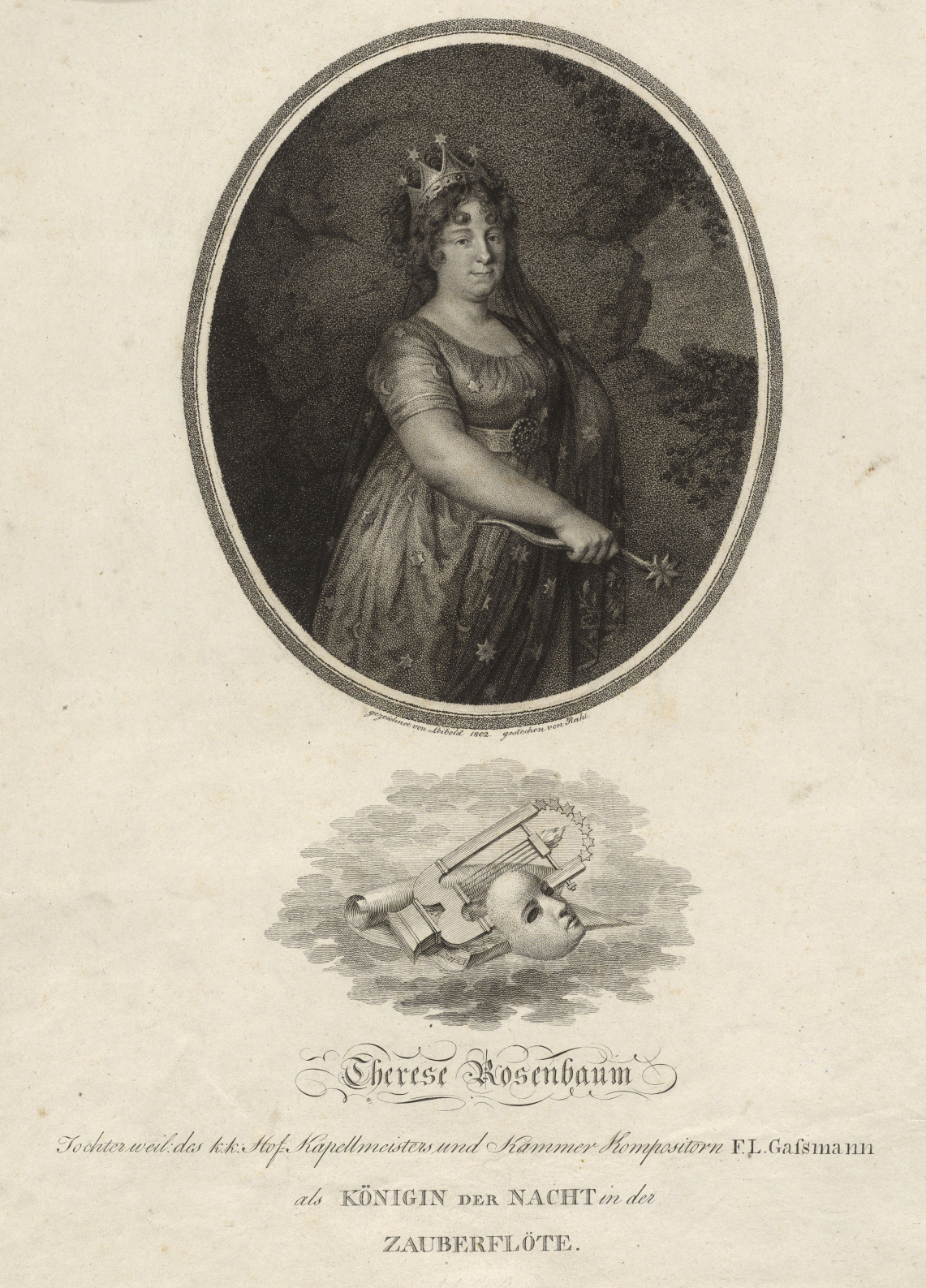
Rosenbaum as the Queen of the Night

Therese Rosenbaum, or Therese Rosenbaum-Gassmann (originally Maria Theresia Josepha Gassmann: 1 April 1774 – 8 September 1837) was an Austrian operatic soprano. Her most famous role was the Queen of the Night in Mozart's The Magic Flute.

== Life ==
She was born in Vienna in 1774, daughter of the composer Florian Leopold Gassmann. Her sister Anna (1771–1852) also became an operatic soprano. Therese studied singing with Antonio Salieri, and from 1790 was engaged at the Theater am Kärntnertor, the theatre of the Vienna Court Opera.

She appeared in 1801 in the first production at the Theater am Kärntnertor of Wolfgang Amadeus Mozart's The Magic Flute, as the Queen of the Night. This was her most famous role, regarded as suiting her coloratura voice. She appeared again in the role from 1812 to 1814. Other roles included Elisetta in Cimarosa's The Secret Marriage, the Countess in Mozart's The Marriage of Figaro, and Donna Elvira in Mozart's Don Giovanni.

In 1800 she married Joseph Carl Rosenbaum, secretary of Nikolaus II, Prince Esterházy. She and Rosenbaum were friends of Joseph Haydn, and she sang in premieres of his church music, in particular the choral version of The Seven Last Words of Christ.

Therese Rosembaum retired from the Vienna Court Opera in 1824. She died in Vienna in 1837.
