= Missa in tempore belli =

1796 musical work by Joseph Haydn

- Mass by Joseph Haydn
- The composer in 1791, portrait by Thomas Hardy
- Other name: Paukenmesse
- Key: C major
- Catalogue: Hob. XXII/9
- Performed: 26 December 1796: Vienna
- Vocal: SATB choir and soloists
- Instrumental: orchestra

Missa in tempore belli (English: Mass in Time of War) is a setting of the mass by Joseph Haydn. It is catalogued Mass No. 10 in C major (Hob. XXII:9). Known also as the Paukenmesse due to the dramatic use of timpani, it is one of the most popular of his fourteen mass settings. The autograph manuscript contains the title "Missa in tempore belli" in Haydn's handwriting.

== Background ==
Haydn composed this mass at Eisenstadt in August 1796, at the time of Austria’s general mobilisation into war. Four years into the European war that followed the French Revolution, Austrian troops were doing badly against the French in Italy and Germany, and Austria feared invasion. Reflecting the troubled mood of his time, Haydn integrated references to battle in the Benedictus and Agnus Dei movements. The Mass was first performed on 26 December 1796, in the Piarist Church of Maria Treu in Vienna.

Haydn was a deeply religious man who appended the words “Praise be to God” at the end of every completed score. As Kapellmeister to Prince Nikolaus II Esterházy, Haydn’s principal duty in the last period of his life, beginning in 1796, was the composition of an annual mass to honour the name day of Prince Nicholas’ wife, Princess Maria Hermenegild, 8 September, the birth of the Blessed Virgin. In a final flowering of his genius, he faithfully completed six magnificent masses (with increasingly larger orchestras) for this occasion. Thus Missa in Tempore Belli was performed at the family church, the Bergkirche, at Eisenstadt on 29 September 1797. Haydn also composed his oratorio The Creation around the same time and the two great works share some of his signature vitality and tone-painting.

This piece has been long thought to express an anti-war sentiment, even though there is no explicit message in the text itself, and no clear indication from Haydn that this was his intention. What is found in the score is a very unsettled nature to the music, not normally associated with Haydn, which has led scholars to the conclusion that it is anti-war in nature. This is especially noticed in the Benedictus and Agnus Dei. During the time of the composition of the Mass, the Austrian government had issued a decree in 1796, that "no Austrian should speak of peace until the enemy is driven back to its customary borders." Whether this is enough to call it anti-war in nature is certainly debatable because most of the mass is of a lyrically joyful nature.

== Scoring and structure ==
The vocal parts of the mass are performed by four soloists (soprano, alto, tenor and bass) and a four-part choir. The soloists often appear as an ensemble, without arias. Haydn scored the mass for a large orchestra, even adding instruments for a performance in Vienna.

In the following table of the movements, the markings, keys and time signatures are taken from the choral score, using the symbols for common time and alla breve. The choir and orchestra are present in all movements.

No.	Part	Incipit	Solo voices	Marking	Key	Time
1	Kyrie		SATB	Largo; Allegro moderato	C major	common time
2	Gloria	Gloria in excelsis Deo		Vivace	C major	3/4
2	Gloria	Qui tollis peccata mundi	B	Adagio	A major	cut time
2	Gloria	Quoniam tu solus Sanctus	S	Allegro	C major	3/4
2	Gloria	Cum sancto Spiritu	S	Più stretto	C major	3/4
3	Credo	Credo in unum Deum		Allegro	C major	common time
3	Credo	Et incarnatus est	SATB	Adagio	C minor	3/4
3	Credo	Et resurrexit	SATB	Allegro	C major	3/4
4	Sanctus	Sanctus Dominus	A	Adagio	C major	common time
4	Sanctus	Pleni sunt coeli et terra	T	Allegro con spirito	C major	common time
5	Benedictus	Benedictus qui venit	SATB	Andante	C minor	6/8
5	Benedictus	Benedictus qui venit	SATB	Andante	C major	6/8
5	Benedictus	Osanna in excelsis	SATB	Andante	C major	6/8
6	Agnus Dei	Agnus Dei		Adagio	F major	3/4
6	Agnus Dei	Dona nobis pacem	SATB	Allegro con spiritu	C major	3/4
6	Agnus Dei	Dona nobis pacem		Più presto	C major	3/4

== Music ==
I. Kyrie

II. Gloria

III. Credo

IV. Sanctus

V. Benedictus

VI. Agnus Dei
Performed by the Orchestra and Chorus of St. Martin Eisenstadt

The Kyrie opens like a symphony in sonata form, with a slow introduction before moving on to the main theme. The "Kyrie Eleison" (Lord have Mercy) part is given more importance—the "Christe Eleison" occupies just four bars.

The Gloria is a little choral symphony in the form Vivace–Adagio–Allegro (Fast–Slow–Fast). The lyrical, and deeply felt cello and baritone part in the middle section, beginning "Qui tollis peccata mundi", is especially beautiful.

The Credo is divided into sections that generally reflect the text, but with Haydn's usual overriding sense of structure. At the opening, as each voice part enters with a joyous and rhythmic theme, it takes a different line of the text. The Crucifixus is set in triple meter. A truncated fugue begins at the last line, but it is interrupted midway by an elaborate coda using the solo quartet, with the chorus joining in antiphonally.

The Sanctus opens slowly, but builds to a rather ominous forte on the text "Pleni sunt coeli" before moving to a brief, more genteel "Hosanna in Excelsis".

The In Tempore Belli first suggests itself in the Benedictus. This is set mostly in short nervous phrases for the solo quartet, with the three lower voices singing detached notes below the soprano melody reminiscent of pizzicato strings.

The sense of anxiety and foreboding continues with ominous drumbeats and wind fanfares in the Agnus Dei, which opens with minor-key timpani strokes (hence the German nickname, Paukenmesse), perhaps fate itself, knocking seemingly from the depths. This foreshadows the timpani-catalysed drama of the Agnus Dei in Beethoven's Missa Solemnis. The music brightens with trumpet fanfares, ending with an almost dance-like entreaty and celebration of peace, "Dona nobis pacem" (Give us peace).
