= List of compositions by Joseph Haydn =

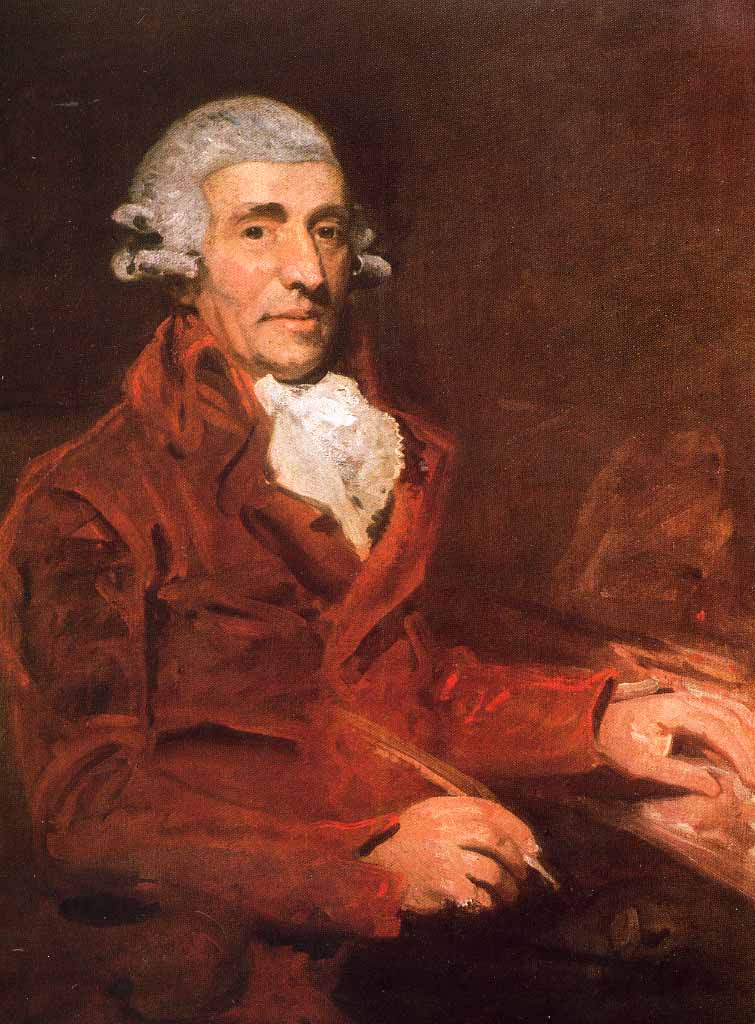
Painting of Haydn by John Hoppner (1791)

Joseph Haydn was a prolific composer of the classical period. He is regarded as the "father of the symphony" and the "father of the string quartet" for his more than 100 symphonies and almost 70 string quartets. Haydn also produced numerous operas, masses, concertos, piano sonatas and other compositions. Haydn's works were catalogued by Anthony van Hoboken in his Hoboken catalogue. Unlike most other catalogues which sort works chronologically, the Hoboken catalogue sorts by musical genre.

== Symphonies ==
Hob. No.	Title	Key	Date	Instrumentation	Notes
I:1	Symphony No. 1 "Lukawitz" (Lukavická)	D major	1759	Orchestra	Dolní Lukavice symphony
I:2	Symphony No. 2	C major	1764	Orchestra	Dolní Lukavice symphony
I:3	Symphony No. 3	G major	1762	Orchestra	Dolní Lukavice symphony
I:4	Symphony No. 4	D major	1762	Orchestra	Dolní Lukavice symphony
I:5	Symphony No. 5	A major	1762	Orchestra	Dolní Lukavice symphony
I:6	Symphony No. 6 "Le matin"	D major	1761	Orchestra	
I:7	Symphony No. 7 "Le midi"	C major	1761	Orchestra	
I:8	Symphony No. 8 "Le soir"	G major	1761	Orchestra	
I:9	Symphony No. 9	C major	1762	Orchestra	
I:10	Symphony No. 10	D major	1760	Orchestra	
I:11	Symphony No. 11	E♭ major	1761	Orchestra	
I:12	Symphony No. 12	E major	1763	Orchestra	
I:13	Symphony No. 13	D major	1763	Orchestra	
I:14	Symphony No. 14	A major	1764	Orchestra	
I:15	Symphony No. 15	D major	1764	Orchestra	
I:16	Symphony No. 16	B♭ major	1763	Orchestra	
I:17	Symphony No. 17	F major	1760–61	Orchestra	
I:18	Symphony No. 18	G major	1757–59	Orchestra	
I:19	Symphony No. 19	D major	1759–60	Orchestra	
I:20	Symphony No. 20	C major	1757–63	Orchestra	
I:21	Symphony No. 21	A major	1764	Orchestra	
I:22	Symphony No. 22 "The Philosopher"	E♭ major	1764, rev. 1773	Orchestra	
I:23	Symphony No. 23	G major	1764	Orchestra	
I:24	Symphony No. 24	D major	1764	Orchestra	
I:25	Symphony No. 25	C major	1760–64	Orchestra	
I:26	Symphony No. 26 "Lamentatione"	D minor	c. 1768	Orchestra	
I:27	Symphony No. 27	G major	1757–60	Orchestra	
I:28	Symphony No. 28	A major	1765	Orchestra	
I:29	Symphony No. 29	E major	1765	Orchestra	
I:30	Symphony No. 30 "Alleluia"	C major	1765	Orchestra	
I:31	Symphony No. 31 "Hornsignal"	D major	1765	Orchestra	
I:32	Symphony No. 32	C major	1757–63	Orchestra	
I:33	Symphony No. 33	C major	1761–62	Orchestra	
I:34	Symphony No. 34	D minor	1763	Orchestra	
I:35	Symphony No. 35	B♭ major	1767	Orchestra	
I:36	Symphony No. 36	E♭ major	1761–62	Orchestra	
I:37	Symphony No. 37	C major	1757–58	Orchestra	
I:38	Symphony No. 38 "The Echo"	C major	1767	Orchestra	
I:39	Symphony No. 39	G minor	1765–68	Orchestra	
I:40	Symphony No. 40	F major	1763	Orchestra	
I:41	Symphony No. 41	C major	1768	Orchestra	
I:42	Symphony No. 42	D major	1771	Orchestra	
I:43	Symphony No. 43 "Mercury"	E♭ major	1770–71	Orchestra	
I:44	Symphony No. 44 "Trauer"	E minor	1772	Orchestra	
I:45	Symphony No. 45 "Farewell"	F♯ minor	1772	Orchestra	
I:46	Symphony No. 46	B major	1772	Orchestra	
I:47	Symphony No. 47 "Palindrome"	G major	1772	Orchestra	
I:48	Symphony No. 48 "Maria Theresia"	C major	1768–69	Orchestra	
I:49	Symphony No. 49 "La Passione"	F minor	1768	Orchestra	
I:50	Symphony No. 50	C major	1773–74	Orchestra	
I:51	Symphony No. 51	B♭ major	1773	Orchestra	
I:52	Symphony No. 52	C minor	1771–72	Orchestra	
I:53	Symphony No. 53 "L'impériale"	D major	1777–79	Orchestra	
I:54	Symphony No. 54	G major	1774	Orchestra	
I:55	Symphony No. 55 "Schoolmaster"	E♭ major	1774	Orchestra	
I:56	Symphony No. 56	C major	1774	Orchestra	
I:57	Symphony No. 57	D major	1774	Orchestra	
I:58	Symphony No. 58	F major	1767	Orchestra	
I:59	Symphony No. 59 "Fire"	A major	1768	Orchestra	
I:60	Symphony No. 60 "Il distratto"	C major	1774	Orchestra	
I:61	Symphony No. 61	D major	1776	Orchestra	
I:62	Symphony No. 62	D major	1780	Orchestra	
I:63	Symphony No. 63 "La Roxelane"	C major	1777, rev. 1779	Orchestra	
I:64	Symphony No. 64 "Tempora mutantur"	A major	1773–75	Orchestra	
I:65	Symphony No. 65	A major	1769	Orchestra	
I:66	Symphony No. 66	B♭ major	1774–76	Orchestra	
I:67	Symphony No. 67	F major	1774–79	Orchestra	
I:68	Symphony No. 68	B♭ major	1774–76	Orchestra	
I:69	Symphony No. 69 Laudon	C major	1775–76	Orchestra	
I:70	Symphony No. 70	D major	1778–79	Orchestra	
I:71	Symphony No. 71	B♭ major	1779–80	Orchestra	
I:72	Symphony No. 72	D major	1763–65	Orchestra	
I:73	Symphony No. 73 "La Chasse"	D major	1781–82	Orchestra	
I:74	Symphony No. 74	E♭ major	1780–81	Orchestra	
I:75	Symphony No. 75	D major	1779	Orchestra	
I:76	Symphony No. 76	E♭ major	1781–82	Orchestra	
I:77	Symphony No. 77	B♭ major	1782	Orchestra	
I:78	Symphony No. 78	C minor	1782	Orchestra	
I:79	Symphony No. 79	F major	1784	Orchestra	
I:80	Symphony No. 80	D minor	1784	Orchestra	
I:81	Symphony No. 81	G major	1784	Orchestra	
I:82	Symphony No. 82 "L'Ours"	C major	1786	Orchestra	Paris symphony
I:83	Symphony No. 83 "La Poule"	G minor	1785	Orchestra	Paris symphony
I:84	Symphony No. 84	E♭ major	1786	Orchestra	Paris symphony
I:85	Symphony No. 85 "La Reine"	B♭ major	1785–86	Orchestra	Paris symphony
I:86	Symphony No. 86	D major	1786	Orchestra	Paris symphony
I:87	Symphony No. 87	A major	1785	Orchestra	Paris symphony
I:88	Symphony No. 88	G major	1787	Orchestra	
I:89	Symphony No. 89	F major	1787	Orchestra	
I:90	Symphony No. 90	C major	1788	Orchestra	
I:91	Symphony No. 91	E♭ major	1788	Orchestra	
I:92	Symphony No. 92 "Oxford"	G major	1789	Orchestra	
I:93	Symphony No. 93	D major	1791	Orchestra	London symphony
I:94	Symphony No. 94 "Surprise"	G major	1791	Orchestra	London symphony
I:95	Symphony No. 95	C minor	1791	Orchestra	London symphony
I:96	Symphony No. 96 "The Miracle"	D major	1791	Orchestra	London symphony
I:97	Symphony No. 97	C major	1792	Orchestra	London symphony
I:98	Symphony No. 98	B♭ major	1792	Orchestra	London symphony
I:99	Symphony No. 99	E♭ major	1793–94	Orchestra	London symphony
I:100	Symphony No. 100 "Military"	G major	1793–94	Orchestra	London symphony
I:101	Symphony No. 101 "The Clock"	D major	1794	Orchestra	London symphony
I:102	Symphony No. 102	B♭ major	1794	Orchestra	London symphony
I:103	Symphony No. 103 "Drum-roll"	E♭ major	1795	Orchestra	London symphony
I:104	Symphony No. 104 "London"	D major	1795	Orchestra	London symphony
I:105	Sinfonia concertante	B♭ major	1792	Orchestra	
I:106		D major		Orchestra	Only first movement (Allegro) is extant; sometimes used as the overture to Le pescatrici
I:107	Symphony A	B♭ major	1756	Orchestra	Arranged as string quartet op. 1, no. 5 Hob. III/5
I:108	Symphony B	B♭ major	1762	Orchestra	
I:C8		C major		Orchestra	Most likely by Johann Baptist Wanhal
I:G1		G major		Orchestra	Actually by Adalbert Gyrowetz

== Overtures ==
Hob. No.	Title	Key	Date	Instrumentation	Notes
Ia:1	L'infedeltà delusa	C major	c. 1769–73	Orchestra	
Ia:2	Il ritorno di Tobia	C major	1774	Orchestra	
Ia:3	L'anima del filosofo	C major	1791	Orchestra	
Ia:4	Overture	D major	1776–85	Orchestra	
Ia:5	Acide e Galatea	D major	1762	Orchestra	
Ia:6	L'incontro improvviso	D major	1774–75	Orchestra	
Ia:7	Overture	D major	1777	Orchestra	Alternate finale to Symphony No. 53
Ia:7bis	Overture	D major	1777	Orchestra	Malapropism of Hob. Ia:7
Ia:8	Philemon und Baucis	D major	1773	Orchestra	
Ia:9	King Lear	E♭ major		Orchestra	Composed by WG Stegmann
Ia:10	Lo speziale	G major	1768	Orchestra	
Ia:11	Overture	G major	1780	Orchestra	Prelude to the entrance choir of the first act of La fedeltà premiata
Ia:12	Overture	G minor	1777	Orchestra	Arrangement of pieces from Il mondo della luna. Uncertain
Ia:13	L'isola disabitata	G minor	1779	Orchestra	
Ia:14	Armida	B♭ major	1783	Orchestra	
Ia:15	La vera costanza	B♭ major	1777	Orchestra	
Ia:16	Orlando paladino	B♭ major	1782	Orchestra	
Ia:17	La fedeltà premiata			Orchestra	

== Divertimentos in 4 and more parts ==
Hob. No.	Title	Key	Date	Instrumentation	Notes
II:1	Cassation	G major	1766	small orchestra	
II:2	Cassation	G major	1754	strings	
II:3	Feldparthie	G major	1760	2 oboes, 2 bassoons, 2 horns	
II:4		F major		2 clarinets, bassoon, 2 horns	lost
II:5		F major	1767–68	2 clarinets, bassoon, 2 horns	lost; arrangement of H. X/10
II:6	String Quartet No. 5	E♭ major	1765	2 violins, viola, cello	Op. 1/0
II:7	Feldparthie	C major	1765	2 oboes, 2 bassoons, 2 horns	
II:8	Cassation	D major	1767	2 flutes, 2 horns, 2 violins, 2 violas, bass	
II:9	Cassation	G major	1764	2 oboes, 2 horns, 2 violins, 2 violas, bass	
II:10	"Der verliebte Schulmeister"	D major	1766	orchestra	lost
II:11	"Mann und Weib / Der Geburtstag"	C major	1765 or before	flute, oboe, 2 violins, cello, bass	
II:12	Feldparthie	B♭ major		small orchestra	lost
II:13		D major		small orchestra	lost
II:14		C major	1761	2 clarinets, 2 horns	
II:15	Feldparthie	F major	1767	2 oboes, 2 bassoons, 2 horns	
II:16	Feldparthie	C major	1766	small orchestra	
II:17	Cassation	C major	1766	small orchestra	
II:18		D major		orchestra	lost
II:19		G major		orchestra	lost
II:20	Cassation	F major	1763	small orchestra	
II:20a	Feldparthie	A major		small orchestra	lost
II:21	"Eine Abendmusik"	E♭ major	1763	2 horns, strings	
II:22	Cassation	D major	1765	2 horns, strings	
II:23	Feldparthie	F major	1765 or before	2 oboes, 2 bassoons, 2 horns	
II:24		E♭ major	1775	flute, 2 cor anglais, bassoon, 2 horns	
II:24a		G major	1775	2 flutes, 2 oboes, 2 horns, strings	lost; arrangement of H. V/15
II:24b		A major	1775	2 flutes, 2 oboes, 2 horns, strings	lost; arrangement of H. V/7
II:25	Notturno No. 1	C major	1788–90, rev. 1792	small orchestra	
II:26	Notturno No. 2	F major	1788–90, rev. 1792	small orchestra	
II:27	Notturno No. 3	G major	1788–90, rev. 1792	small orchestra	
II:28	Notturno No. 4	F major	1788–90, rev. 1792	small orchestra	
II:29	Notturna No. 5	C major	1788–90, rev. 1792	small orchestra	
II:30	Notturno No. 6	G major	1788–90, rev. 1792	small orchestra	
II:31	Notturno No. 7	C major	1788–90, rev. 1792	small orchestra	
II:32	Notturno No. 8	C major	1788–90, rev. 1792	small orchestra	
II:33	Scherzando No. 1	F major	1765 or before	orchestra	
II:34	Scherzando No. 2	C major	1765 or before	orchestra	
II:35	Scherzando No. 3	D major	1765 or before	orchestra	
II:36	Scherzando No. 4	G major	1765 or before	orchestra	
II:37	Scherzando No. 5	E major	1765 or before	orchestra	
II:38	Scherzando No. 6	A major	1765 or before	orchestra	
II:39	"Echo"	E♭ major	c. 1761	4 violins, 2 cellos	uncertain
II:40	Sextet	E♭ major	1781	Oboe, Bassoon, Horn, Violin, Viola, Bass	uncertain
II:41	Feldparthie No. 1	B♭ major	1782 or before	2 oboes, 2 clarinets*, 2 bassoons, 2 horns	uncertain; 2 clarinets added by Pohl
II:42	Feldparthie No. 2	B♭ major	1782 or before	2 oboes, 2 clarinets*, 2 bassoons, 2 horns	uncertain; 2 clarinets added by Pohl
II:43	Feldparthie No. 3	B♭ major	1782 or before	2 oboes, 2 clarinets*, 2 bassoons, 2 horns	uncertain; 2 clarinets added by Pohl
II:44	Feldparthie No. 4	B♭ major	1782 or before	2 Oboes, 3 Bassoons, Contrabassoon, 2 Horns	uncertain
II:45	Feldparthie No. 5	B♭ major	1782 or before	2 Oboes, 3 Bassoons, Contrabassoon, 2 Horns	uncertain
II:46	Feldparthie No. 6 "St. Antonius"	B♭ major	1782 or before	2 Oboes, 3 Bassoons, Contrabassoon, 2 Horns	uncertain; possibly by Ignaz Pleyel; the second movement "Chorale St. Antoni" was used by Johannes Brahms for his "Variations"
II:47	"Toy Symphony"	C major		2 Violins, Bass, 7 Toys and Percussion	spurious; actually "Berchtesgadener Symphonie" composed by Edmund Angerer
II:D9	Flute Quartet	D major		Flute, Violin, Viola, Cello	doubtful
II:D10	Flute Quartet	D major		Flute, Violin, Viola, Cello	doubtful
II:D11	Flute Quartet	D major		Flute, Violin, Viola, Cello	doubtful
II:D18		D major		2 oboes, 2 bassoons, 2 horns	doubtful
II:F7	Partita for winds	F major		2 oboes, 2 clarinets, 2 horns, 2 bassoons	spurious; actually composed by Paul Wranitzky
II:G1		G major	c. 1759–60	2 oboes, 2 horns, strings	doubtful
II:G4	Flute Quartet	G major		Flute, Violin, Viola, Cello	doubtful
II:deest		D major		2 oboes, 2 bassoons, 2 horns	
II:deest		G major		2 oboes, 2 bassoons, 2 horns	

== String quartets ==
Unlike the majority of Haydn's compositions which are known by their Hoboken numbers, his string quartets are best known by their opus number.

Hob. No.	Title	Key	Date	Instrumentation	Notes
III:1	String Quartet No. 1 "La Chasse"	B♭ major	c. 1757–62		Op. 1, No. 1
III:2	String Quartet No. 2	E♭ major	c. 1757–62		Op. 1, No. 2
III:3	String Quartet No. 3	D major	c. 1757–62		Op. 1, No. 3
III:4	String Quartet No. 4	G major	c. 1757–62		Op. 1, No. 4
III:5		B♭ major	c. 1757–62		Op. 1, No. 5. Later found to be the Symphony A
III:6	String Quartet No. 6	C major	c. 1757–62		Op. 1, No. 6
III:7	String Quartet No. 7	A major	c. 1757–62		Op. 2, No. 1
III:8	String Quartet No. 8	E major	c. 1757–62		Op. 2, No. 2
III:9		E♭ major	c. 1757–62		arrangement of Cassation in E♭ major, Hob. II:21, Op. 2, No. 3
III:10	String Quartet No. 9	F major	c. 1757–62		Op. 2, No. 4
III:11		D major	c. 1757–62		arrangement of Cassation in D major, Hob. II:22, Op. 2, No. 5
III:12	String Quartet No. 10	B♭ major	c. 1757–62		Op. 2, No. 6
III:13	String Quartet, Op. 3, No. 1	E major			Spurious, by Roman Hoffstetter
III:14	String Quartet, Op. 3, No. 2	C major			Spurious, by Roman Hoffstetter
III:15	String Quartet, Op. 3, No. 3	G major			Spurious, by Roman Hoffstetter
III:16	String Quartet, Op. 3, No. 4	B♭ major			Spurious, by Roman Hoffstetter
III:17	String Quartet, Op. 3, No. 5	F major			Spurious, by Roman Hoffstetter
III:18	String Quartet, Op. 3, No. 6	A major			Spurious, by Roman Hoffstetter
III:19	String Quartet No. 12	C major	1769		Op. 9, No. 1
III:20	String Quartet No. 14	E♭ major	1769		Op. 9, No. 2
III:21	String Quartet No. 13	G major	1769		Op. 9, No. 3
III:22	String Quartet No. 11	D minor	1769		Op. 9, No. 4
III:23	String Quartet No. 15	B♭ major	1769		Op. 9, No. 5
III:24	String Quartet No. 16	A major	1769		Op. 9, No. 6
III:25	String Quartet No. 18	E major	1771		Op. 17, No. 1
III:26	String Quartet No. 17	F major	1771		Op. 17, No. 2
III:27	String Quartet No. 21	E♭ major	1771		Op. 17, No. 3
III:28	String Quartet No. 19	C minor	1771		Op. 17, No. 4
III:29	String Quartet No. 22	G major	1771		Op. 17, No. 5
III:30	String Quartet No. 20	D major	1771		Op. 17, No. 6
III:31	String Quartet No. 28	E♭ major	1772		Sun Quartets, Op. 20, No. 1
III:32	String Quartet No. 25	C major	1772		Sun Quartets, Op. 20, No. 2
III:33	String Quartet No. 26	G minor	1772		Sun Quartets, Op. 20, No. 3
III:34	String Quartet No. 27	D major	1772		Sun Quartets, Op. 20, No. 4
III:35	String Quartet No. 23	F minor	1772		Sun Quartets, Op. 20, No. 5
III:36	String Quartet No. 24	A major	1772		Sun Quartets, Op. 20, No. 6
III:37	String Quartet No. 31	B minor	1781		Russian Quartets, Op. 33, No. 1
III:38	String Quartet No. 30 Joke	E♭ major	1781		Russian Quartets, Op. 33, No. 2
III:39	String Quartet No. 32 Bird	C major	1781		Russian Quartets, Op. 33, No. 3
III:40	String Quartet No. 34	B♭ major	1781		Russian Quartets, Op. 33, No. 4
III:41	String Quartet No. 29 How do you do	G major	1781		Russian Quartets, Op. 33, No. 5
III:42	String Quartet No. 33	D major	1781		Russian Quartets, Op. 33, No. 6
III:43	String Quartet No. 35	D minor	1785		Op. 42
III:44	String Quartet No. 36	B♭ major	1787		Prussian Quartets, Op. 50, No. 1
III:45	String Quartet No. 37	C major	1787		Prussian Quartets, Op. 50, No. 2
III:46	String Quartet No. 38	E♭ major	1787		Prussian Quartets, Op. 50, No. 3
III:47	String Quartet No. 39	F♯ minor	1787		Prussian Quartets, Op. 50, No. 4
III:48	String Quartet No. 40 Dream	F major	1787		Prussian Quartets, Op. 50, No. 5
III:49	String Quartet No. 41 La grenouille	D major	1787		Prussian Quartets, Op. 50, No. 6
III:50	The Seven Last Words of Christ No. 1	B♭ major	1785–87		
III:51	The Seven Last Words of Christ No. 2	C minor	1785–87		
III:52	The Seven Last Words of Christ No. 3	E major	1785–87		
III:53	The Seven Last Words of Christ No. 4	F major	1785–87		
III:54	The Seven Last Words of Christ No. 5	A major	1785–87		
III:55	The Seven Last Words of Christ No. 6	G minor	1785–87		
III:56	The Seven Last Words of Christ No. 7	E♭ major	1785–87		
III:57	String Quartet No. 42	C major	1788		Tost Quartets, Set 1, Op. 54, No. 2
III:58	String Quartet No. 43	G major	1788		Tost Quartets, Set 1, Op. 54, No. 1
III:59	String Quartet No. 44	E major	1788		Tost Quartets, Set 1, Op. 54, No. 3
III:60	String Quartet No. 45	A major	1788		Tost Quartets, Set 2, Op. 55, No. 1
III:61	String Quartet No. 46 Razor	F minor	1788		Tost Quartets, Set 2, Op. 55, No. 2
III:62	String Quartet No. 47	B♭ major	1788		Tost Quartets, Set 2, Op. 55, No. 3
III:63	String Quartet No. 53 The Lark	D major	1790		Tost Quartets, Set 3, Op. 64, No. 5
III:64	String Quartet No. 52	E♭ major	1790		Tost Quartets, Set 3, Op. 64, No. 6
III:65	String Quartet No. 48	C major	1790		Tost Quartets, Set 3, Op. 64, No. 1
III:66	String Quartet No. 51	G major	1790		Tost Quartets, Set 3 Op. 64, No. 4
III:67	String Quartet No. 50	B♭ major	1790		Tost Quartets, Set 3, Op. 64, No. 3
III:68	String Quartet No. 49	B minor	1790		Tost Quartets, Set 3, Op. 64, No. 2
III:69	String Quartet No. 54	B♭ major	1793		Apponyi Quartets, Op. 71, No. 1
III:70	String Quartet No. 55	D major	1793		Apponyi Quartets, Op. 71, No. 2
III:71	String Quartet No. 56	E♭ major	1793		Apponyi Quartets, Op. 71, No. 3
III:72	String Quartet No. 57	C major	1793		Apponyi Quartets, Op. 74, No. 1
III:73	String Quartet No. 58	F major	1793		Apponyi Quartets, Op. 74, No. 2
III:74	String Quartet No. 59 Rider	G minor	1793		Apponyi Quartets, Op. 74, No. 3
III:75	String Quartet No. 60 Jack-in-the-box	G major	1796–97		Erdödy Quartets, Op. 76, No. 1
III:76	String Quartet No. 61 Fifths	D minor	1796–97		Erdödy Quartets, Op. 76, No. 2
III:77	String Quartet No. 62 Emperor	C major	1796–97		Erdödy Quartets, Op. 76, No. 3
III:78	String Quartet No. 63 Sunrise	B♭ major	1796–97		Erdödy Quartets, Op. 76, No. 4
III:79	String Quartet No. 64	D major	1796–97		Erdödy Quartets, Op. 76, No. 5
III:80	String Quartet No. 65	E♭ major	1796–97		Erdödy Quartets, Op. 76, No. 6
III:81	String Quartet No. 66	G major	1799		Lobkowitz Quartets, Op. 77, No. 1
III:82	String Quartet No. 67	F major	1799		Lobkowitz Quartets, Op. 77, No. 2
III:83	String Quartet No. 68	D minor	1803		Op. 103, incomplete

== Divertimentos in 3 parts ==
Hob. No.	Title	Key	Date	Instrumentation	Notes
IV:1	London Trio No. 1	C major	1794	2 flutes, cello	
IV:2	London Trio No. 2	G major	1794	2 flutes, cello	
IV:3	London Trio No. 3	G major	1794	2 flutes, cello	
IV:4	London Trio No. 4	G major	1794	2 flutes, cello	
IV:5		E♭ major	1767	Horn, violin, cello	
IV:6		D major	1784	2 violins (or flute, violin), cello	
IV:7		G major	1784	2 violins (or flute, violin), cello	
IV:8		C major	1784	2 violins (or flute, violin), cello	
IV:9		G major	1784	2 violins (or flute, violin), cello	
IV:10		A major	1784	2 violins (or flute, violin), cello	
IV:11		D major	1784	2 violins (or flute, violin), cello	

== String trios ==
Hob. No.	Title	Key	Date	Instrumentation	Notes
V:1		E major	1767	2 violins, cello	
V:2		F major	1767	2 violins, cello	
V:3		B minor	1767	2 violins, cello	
V:4		E♭ major	before 1767	2 violins, cello	
V:5		B major	c. 1765	2 violins, cello	lost
V:6		E♭ major	c. 1765	2 violins, cello	
V:7		A major	1766	2 violins, cello	
V:8		B♭ major	1765 or before	violin, viola, cello	
V:9		E♭ major	1767	2 violins, cello	lost
V:10		F major	1767 or before	2 violins, cello	
V:11		E♭ major	1765	2 violins, cello	
V:12		E major	1767 or before	2 violins, cello	
V:13		B♭ major	1765	2 violins, cello	
V:14		B minor	1765	2 violins, cello	lost
V:15		D major	1762	2 violins, cello	
V:16		C major	1766	2 violins, cello	
V:17		E♭ major	1766	2 violins, cello	
V:18		B♭ major	1765	2 violins, cello	
V:19		E major	1765	2 violins, cello	
V:20		G major	1766	2 violins, cello	
V:21		D major	1768 or before	2 violins, cello	
V:D1		D major	c. 1765	2 violins, cello	
V:D2		D major		2 violins, cello	doubtful
V:F1		F major		2 violins, cello	
V:G1		G major	c. 1765	2 violins, cello	
V:G2		G major		2 violins, cello	doubtful
V:G3		G major	c. 1765	2 violins, cello	doubtful
V:A1		A major		2 violins, cello	doubtful
V:B1		B♭ major	c. 1765	2 violins, cello	

== Various duos ==
Hob. No.	Title	Key	Date	Instrumentation	Notes
VI:1	String Duo	F major	c. 1777	violin, viola	
VI:2	String Duo	A major	c. 1777	violin, viola	
VI:3	String Duo	B♭ major	c. 1777	violin, viola	
VI:4	String Duo	D major	c. 1777	violin, viola	
VI:5	String Duo	E♭ major	c. 1777	violin, viola	
VI:6	String Duo	C major	c. 1777	violin, viola	
VI:D1	String Duo	D major	Unknown	violin, cello	Probably to be attributed to Leopold Hofmann
VI:D2	Sonata for 2 Violins	D major	Unknown	2 violins	Op. 6, No. 4; doubtful
VI:Es1	Sonata for 2 Violins	E♭ major	Unknown	2 violins	Op. 6, No. 5; doubtful
VI:F1	Sonata for 2 Violins	F major	Unknown	2 violins	Op. 6, No. 6; doubtful
VI:G1	Sonata for 2 Violins	G major	Unknown	2 violins	Op. 6, No. 1; doubtful
VI:A1	Sonata for 2 Violins	A major	Unknown	2 violins	Op. 6, No. 2; doubtful
VI:B1	Sonata for 2 Violins	B♭ major	Unknown	2 violins	Op. 6, No. 3; doubtful
VI:Anh. 1	Sonata for 2 Violins	B♭ major	Unknown	2 violins	Op. 99, No. 1
VI:Anh. 2	Sonata for 2 Violins	E♭ major	Unknown	2 violins	Op. 99, No. 2
VI:Anh. 3	Sonata for 2 Violins	B♭ major	Unknown	2 violins	Op. 99, No. 3

== Concertos for various instruments ==
Hob. No.	Title	Key	Date	Instrumentation	Notes
VIIa:1	Violin Concerto No. 1	C major	c. 1765	Violin, strings	
VIIa:2	Violin Concerto No. 2	D major	1765 or before	Violin, orchestra	lost
VIIa:3	Violin Concerto No. 3	A major	1770 or before	Violin, 2 oboes?, 2 horns, strings	
VIIa:4	Violin Concerto No. 4	G major	1769 or before	Violin, strings	
VIIa:D1	Violin Concerto	D major		Violin, 2 oboes, 2 horns, strings	doubtful, possibly by Carl Stamitz
VIIa:G1	Violin Concerto	G major	1762	Violin, strings	doubtful, possibly by Michael Haydn
VIIa:A1	Violin Concerto	A major		Violin, strings	doubtful, possibly by Giovanni Mane Giornovichi
VIIa:B1	Violin Concerto	B♭ major	1760	Violin, strings	spurious, actually by Michael Haydn
VIIa:B2	Violin Concerto	B♭ major	1767	Violin, strings	spurious, actually by Christian Cannabich
VIIb:1	Cello Concerto No. 1	C major	1761–65	Cello, 2 oboes, 2 horns, strings	
VIIb:2	Cello Concerto No. 2	D major	1783	Cello, 2 oboes, 2 horns, strings	
VIIb:3	Cello Concerto No. 3	D major	c. 1780 or before	Cello, orchestra	lost
VIIb:4	Cello Concerto No. 4	D major	c. 1750-60	Cello, strings	spurious, attributed to Giovanni Battista Costanzi
VIIb:5	Cello Concerto No. 5	C major	1899	Cello, orchestra	spurious, attributed to David Popper
VIIb:g1	Cello Concerto	G minor	c. 1773	Cello, strings	doubtful, lost
VIIc:1	Double Bass Concerto	D major		Double Bass, strings	lost
VIId:1	Horn Concerto	D major	1765	Horn, orchestra	lost
VIId:2	Concerto for 2 Horns	E♭ major	c. 1760	2 Horns, 2 oboes, 2 horns, strings	lost
VIId:3	Horn Concerto No. 1	D major	1762	Horn, 2 oboes, strings	
VIId:4	Horn Concerto No. 2	D major	1767	Horn, strings	uncertain, possibly by Michael Haydn
VIId:5	Concerto for 2 Horns	E♭ major	1784	2 Horns, strings	uncertain, possibly by Antonio Rosetti; maybe Hob. VIId:2
VIIe:1	Trumpet Concerto	E♭ major	1796	Trumpet, orchestra	
VIIf:1	Flute Concerto	D major	1780 or before	Flute, orchestra	lost
VIIf:D1	Flute Concerto	D major	c. 1760	Flute, strings	spurious, actually by Leopold Hofmann
VIIg:C1	Oboe Concerto	C major	c. 1790	Oboe, orchestra	doubtful, possibly by Ignaz Malzat
VIIh:1	Concerto No. 1 for 2 "Lyra organizzata"	C major	1786	2 Lyra, 2 horns, strings	
VIIh:2	Concerto No. 2 for 2 "Lyra organizzata"	G major	1786	2 Lyra, 2 horns, strings	
VIIh:3	Concerto No. 3 for 2 "Lyra organizzata"	G major	1786	2 Lyra, 2 horns, strings	
VIIh:4	Concerto No. 4 for 2 "Lyra organizzata"	F major	1786	2 Lyra, 2 horns, strings	
VIIh:5	Concerto No. 5 for 2 "Lyra organizzata"	F major	1786	2 Lyra, 2 horns, strings	

== Marches ==
Hob. No.	Title	Key	Date	Instrumentation	Notes
VIII:1	Derbyshire March	E♭ major	1795	2 clarinets, 2 bassoons, contrabassoon, 2 horns, trumpet	
VIII:2	Derbyshire March	C major	1795	2 clarinets, 2 bassoons, contrabassoon, 2 horns, trumpet	
VIII:3	Marsch für den Prinzen von Wales	E♭ major	1792	2 clarinets, 2 bassoons, contrabassoon, 2 horns, trumpet	
VIII:3bis	Marsch für die Royal Society of Musicians	E♭ major	1792	flute, 2 clarinets, 2 bassoons, contrabassoon, 2 horns, 2 trumpets, strings	
VIII:4	Ungarischer National-Marsch	E♭ major	1802	2 oboes, 2 clarinets, 2 bassoons, 2 horns, trumpet	
VIII:5	March from Il mondo della luna	C major	1777	2 oboes, 2 bassoons, timpani, strings	from opera of the same name
VIII:6	Wind Sextet	E♭ major	1793	2 clarinets, 2 bassoons, 2 horns	arrangement of H. XIX:25
VIII:7		E♭ major	c. 1792	2 clarinets, 2 bassoons, contrabassoon, 2 horns, 2 trumpets	
VIII:C1	Marsch Brillande de la 66. Brigad des Chasseurs	C major			doubtful
VIII:C2	Napoleons Marsch	C major			doubtful
VIII:C3		C major			doubtful
VIII:D1	Marsch für das k. k. Infanterie-Regiment Coloredo	D major			doubtful
VIII:Es1	Napoleons Siegesmarsch	E♭ major			doubtful

== Dances ==
Hob. No.	Title	Key	Date	Instrumentation	Notes
IX:1	12 Minuets		1760 or before	2 oboes, 2 horns, strings	
IX:2	6 Minuets		1766 or before	2 horns, strings	uncertain; lost
IX:3	16 Minuets		1767 or before	keyboard	
IX:4	12 Minuets		1766 or before	flute, 2 horns, strings	uncertain
IX:5	6 Minuets		1766	orchestra	
IX:6	12 Minuets		c. 1766	orchestra	uncertain
IX:6a	12 Minuets		1777	orchestra	lost
IX:6b	18 Minuets		1780	orchestra	lost
IX:7	14 Minuets		1784 or before	orchestra	
IX:8	12 Minuets		1785 or before	keyboard	
IX:9	6 German Dances		1787 or before	orchestra	
IX:9a	6 Minuets		c. 1787	keyboard	lost
IX:9b	12 German Dances		1787 or before	orchestra	lost
IX:9c	12 Minuets		1784 or before	orchestra	lost
IX:9d	24 Minuets		1789	orchestra	lost
IX:9e	24 Contredanses		1789	orchestra	lost
IX:10	12 German Dances		before 1793	keyboard	uncertain
IX:11	12 Minuets		1792	orchestra	Also arranged by Haydn for keyboard
IX:12	12 German Dances		1792	orchestra	Also arranged by Haydn for keyboard
IX:13	12 German Dances		c. 1792	keyboard	uncertain
IX:14	13 Minuets			orchestra	uncertain
IX:15	6 Minuets			orchestra	uncertain
IX:16	24 Minuets			orchestra	
IX:17	17 German Dances			orchestra	uncertain; lost
IX:18	9 Minuets			orchestra	uncertain
IX:19	13 Minuets			strings	uncertain
IX:20	18 Minuets			keyboard	uncertain
IX:21	21 Minuets			keyboard	uncertain
IX:22	10 Minuets			keyboard	uncertain
IX:23	Minuet	G major		2 flutes, 2 horns, strings	
IX:24	Minuet	C major	c. 1792	strings	uncertain
IX:25	Minuet	F major	c. 1775	strings	uncertain
IX:26	Minuet	F♯ major		keyboard	
IX:27	Ox minuet	C major	c. 1800	orchestra	uncertain
IX:28	8 Gypsy Dances		c. 1799	keyboard	uncertain
IX:29	5 Contra Dances and 1 Quadrille			keyboard	uncertain
IX:30	English Dance	F major		keyboard	uncertain
IX:31	The Princess of Wales's Favorite Dance			unknown	
IX:Anh.	12 German Dances			keyboard	

== Works for various instruments with baryton ==
Hob. No.	Title	Key	Date	Instrumentation	Notes
X:1	Divertimento	D major	1775	baryton, 2 horns, strings	
X:2	Divertimento	D major	c. 1775	baryton, 2 horns, strings	
X:3	Divertimento	A minor	1775	baryton, 2 horns, strings	
X:4	Divertimento	G major	c. 1775	baryton, 2 horns, strings	
X:5	Divertimento	G major	1775	baryton, 2 horns, strings	
X:6	Divertimento	A major	1775	baryton, 2 horns, strings	
X:7	Divertimento	D major	1767–68	baryton, 2 horns, viola, bass	lost
X:8	Divertimento	G major		baryton, 2 horns, viola, cello	lost
X:9	Divertimento	D major	1770 or before	2 barytons, 2 horns	lost
X:10	Divertimento	D major	1767–68	baryton, 2 horns, viola, bass	
X:11	Divertimento	D major	1770 or before	baryton, cello	
X:12	Divertimento	G major	1775	baryton, flute, 2 horns, strings	

== Trios for baryton, violin (or viola) and cello ==
Hob. No.	Title	Key	Date	Instrumentation	Notes
XI:1	Baryton trio	A major			
XI:2	Baryton trio	A major			
XI:2bis	Baryton trio	G major			uncertain authenticity
XI:3	Baryton trio	A major			
XI:4	Baryton trio	A major			
XI:5	Baryton trio	A major			
XI:6	Baryton trio	A major			
XI:7	Baryton trio	A major			
XI:8	Baryton trio	A major			
XI:9	Baryton trio	A major			
XI:10	Baryton trio	A major			
XI:11	Baryton trio	D major			
XI:12	Baryton trio	A major			
XI:13	Baryton trio	A major			
XI:14	Baryton trio	D major			
XI:15	Baryton trio	A major			
XI:16	Baryton trio	A major			
XI:17	Baryton trio	D major			
XI:18	Baryton trio	A major			lost
XI:19	Baryton trio	A major			
XI:20	Baryton trio	D major			
XI:21	Baryton trio	A major			
XI:22	Baryton trio	A major			Only the first movement (Adagio) survived
XI:23	Baryton trio	D major			fragmentary
XI:24	Baryton trio	D major			
XI:25	Baryton trio	A major			
XI:26	Baryton trio	G major			
XI:27	Baryton trio	D major			
XI:28	Baryton trio	D major			
XI:29	Baryton trio	A major			
XI:30	Baryton trio	G major			
XI:31	Baryton trio	D major			
XI:32	Baryton trio	G major			
XI:33	Baryton trio	A major			
XI:34	Baryton trio	D major			
XI:35	Baryton trio	A major			
XI:36	Baryton trio	D major			
XI:37	Baryton trio	G major			
XI:38	Baryton trio	A major			
XI:39	Baryton trio	D major			
XI:40	Baryton trio	D major	1767		
XI:41	Baryton trio	D major	1767		
XI:42	Baryton trio	D major	1767		
XI:43	Baryton trio	D major			
XI:44	Baryton trio	D major			
XI:45	Baryton trio	D major			
XI:46	Baryton trio	A major			
XI:47	Baryton trio	G major			
XI:48	Baryton trio	D major			
XI:49	Baryton trio	G major			
XI:50	Baryton trio	D major			
XI:51	Baryton trio	A major			
XI:52	Baryton trio	D major			
XI:53	Baryton trio	G major	1767		
XI:54	Baryton trio	D major			
XI:55	Baryton trio	G major			
XI:56	Baryton trio	D major			
XI:57	Baryton trio	A major	1768		
XI:58	Baryton trio	D major			
XI:59	Baryton trio	G major			
XI:60	Baryton trio	A major			
XI:61	Baryton trio	D major			
XI:62	Baryton trio	G major			
XI:63	Baryton trio	D major			
XI:64	Baryton trio	D major			
XI:65	Baryton trio	G major			
XI:66	Baryton trio	A major			
XI:67	Baryton trio	G major			
XI:68	Baryton trio	A major			
XI:69	Baryton trio	D major			
XI:70	Baryton trio	G major			
XI:71	Baryton trio	A major			
XI:72	Baryton trio	D major			
XI:73	Baryton trio	G major			
XI:74	Baryton trio	D major			
XI:75	Baryton trio	A major			
XI:76	Baryton trio	C major	1772		
XI:77	Baryton trio	G major			
XI:78	Baryton trio	D major			
XI:79	Baryton trio	D major	1769		
XI:80	Baryton trio	G major	c. 1769		
XI:81	Baryton trio	D major			
XI:82	Baryton trio	C major			
XI:83	Baryton trio	F major			
XI:84	Baryton trio	G major			
XI:85	Baryton trio	D major			
XI:86	Baryton trio	A major			
XI:87	Baryton trio	A minor			
XI:88	Baryton trio	A major			
XI:89	Baryton trio	G major			
XI:90	Baryton trio	C major			
XI:91	Baryton trio	D major			
XI:92	Baryton trio	G major			
XI:93	Baryton trio	C major			
XI:94	Baryton trio	A major	1771		
XI:95	Baryton trio	D major	1771		
XI:96	Baryton trio	B minor	1771		
XI:97	Baryton trio	D major			
XI:98	Baryton trio	D major			
XI:99	Baryton trio	G major			lost
XI:100	Baryton trio	F major			
XI:101	Baryton trio	C major			
XI:102	Baryton trio	G major			
XI:103	Baryton trio	A major			
XI:104	Baryton trio	D major			
XI:105	Baryton trio	G major	1772		
XI:106	Baryton trio	D major	1772		
XI:107	Baryton trio	D major	1772		
XI:108	Baryton trio	A major			
XI:109	Baryton trio	C major			
XI:110	Baryton trio	C major	1772		
XI:111	Baryton trio	G major	1772		
XI:112	Baryton trio	D major			
XI:113	Baryton trio	D major			
XI:114	Baryton trio	D major	1775 or before		
XI:115	Baryton trio	D major			
XI:116	Baryton trio	G major			
XI:117	Baryton trio	F major			
XI:118	Baryton trio	D major			
XI:119	Baryton trio	G major			Only the baryton part survived
XI:120	Baryton trio	D major			
XI:121	Baryton trio	A major			
XI:122	Baryton trio	A major			
XI:123	Baryton trio	G major	1771		
XI:124	Baryton trio	G major	1771		
XI:125	Baryton trio	G major			
XI:126	Baryton trio	C major	c. 1771		
XI:C2	Baryton trio	C major			doubtful authenticity

== Duos with baryton ==
Hob. No.	Title	Key	Date	Instrumentation	Notes
XII:1	Baryton Duo	A major	1770 or before	baryton, cello	
XII:2	Baryton Duo	G major		baryton, cello	lost
XII:3	Baryton Duo	D major		baryton, cello	lost
XII:4	Baryton Duo	G major	1770 or before	2 barytons	
XII:5	Baryton Duo	D major	1770 or before	2 barytons	
XII:6	Baryton Duo	G major	1770 or before	baryton, unknown	lost
XII:7	Baryton Duo	D major	1770 or before	baryton, cello	lost
XII:8	Baryton Duo	C major	1770 or before	baryton, cello	lost
XII:9	Baryton Duo	G major	1770 or before	baryton, cello	lost
XII:10	Baryton Duo	A major	1770 or before	baryton, cello	lost
XII:11	Baryton Duo	D major	1770 or before	baryton, cello	lost
XII:12	Baryton Duo	G major		baryton, cello	lost
XII:13	Baryton Duo	D major	1770 or before	baryton, unknown	lost
XII:14	Baryton Duo	D major	1770 or before	baryton, unknown	lost
XII:15	Baryton Duo	F major		baryton, cello	lost
XII:16	Baryton Duo	D major		baryton, cello	lost
XII:17	Baryton Duo	D major		baryton, cello	lost
XII:18	Baryton Duo	A major	1770 or before	baryton, cello	lost
XII:19	Baryton Duo	A major	1765 or before	2 barytons, bass	
XII:20	Baryton Duo	G major	1765 or before	baryton, unknown	lost
XII:21	Baryton Duo	D major	1765 or before	baryton, unknown	lost
XII:22	Baryton Duo	A major	1765 or before	baryton, unknown	lost
XII:23	Baryton Duo	G major	1765 or before	baryton, unknown	lost
XII:24	Baryton Duo	D major	1775 or before	baryton, unknown	lost

== Concertos for baryton ==
Hob. No.	Title	Key	Date	Instrumentation	Notes
XIII:1	Concerto for Baryton	D major	1770 or before	Baryton, strings	lost
XIII:2	Concerto for Baryton	D major	1770 or before	Baryton, strings	lost
XIII:3	Concerto for Baryton	D major	1770 or before	2 Baryton, strings	lost

== Divertimentos with keyboard ==
Hob. No.	Title	Key	Date	Instrumentation	Notes
XIV:1		E♭ major	1766 or before	2 horns, violin, cello, keyboard	
XIV:2		F major	1769 or before	baryton, 2 violins, keyboard	rearranged as Piano Trio H. XV:2
XIV:3		C major	1767 or before	2 violins, cello, keyboard	
XIV:4		C major	1764	2 violins, cello, keyboard	
XIV:5		D major	1766	2 violins, cello, keyboard	fragment
XIV:6		G major	1767 or before	2 violins, cello, keyboard	
XIV:7		C major	1766 or before	2 violins, cello, keyboard	
XIV:8		C major	1766 or before	2 violins, cello, keyboard	
XIV:9		F major	1766 or before	2 violins, cello, keyboard	
XIV:10		C major	1764	unknown, keyboard	
XIV:11		C major	1760	2 violins, cello, keyboard	
XIV:12		C major	1766 or before	2 violins, cello, keyboard	
XIV:13		G major	1767	2 violins, cello, keyboard	

== Trios for piano, violin (or flute) and cello ==
Hob. No.	Title	Key	Date	Instrumentation	Notes
XV:1	Piano Trio No. 5	G minor	1766 or before	violin, cello, keyboard	
XV:2	Piano Trio No. 17	F major	c. 1769	violin, cello, keyboard	originally for 2 violins, baryton and piano (Hob. XIV:2)
XV:3	Piano Trio	C major	1784 or before	violin, cello, keyboard	most likely by Ignaz Pleyel
XV:4	Piano Trio	F major	1784 or before	violin, cello, keyboard	most likely by Ignaz Pleyel
XV:5	Piano Trio No. 18	G major	1784 or before	violin, cello, keyboard	
XV:6	Piano Trio No. 19	F major	1784–85	violin, cello, keyboard	
XV:7	Piano Trio No. 20	D major	1784–85	violin, cello, keyboard	
XV:8	Piano Trio No. 21	B♭ major	1784–85	violin, cello, keyboard	
XV:9	Piano Trio No. 22	A major	1785	violin, cello, keyboard	
XV:10	Piano Trio No. 23	E♭ major	1785	violin, cello, keyboard	
XV:11	Piano Trio No. 24	E♭ major	1789 or before	violin, cello, keyboard	
XV:12	Piano Trio No. 25	E minor	1789 or before	violin, cello, keyboard	
XV:13	Piano Trio No. 26	C minor	1789 or before	violin, cello, keyboard	
XV:14	Piano Trio No. 27	A♭ major	1790	violin, cello, keyboard	
XV:15	Piano Trio No. 29	G major	1790	flute, cello, keyboard	
XV:16	Piano Trio No. 28	D major	1790	flute, cello, keyboard	
XV:17	Piano Trio No. 30	F major	1790	flute, cello, keyboard	
XV:18	Piano Trio No. 32	A major	1794	violin, cello, keyboard	
XV:19	Piano Trio No. 33	G minor	1794	violin, cello, keyboard	
XV:20	Piano Trio No. 34	B♭ major	1794	violin, cello, keyboard	
XV:21	Piano Trio No. 35	C major	1794–95	violin, cello, keyboard	
XV:22	Piano Trio No. 36	E♭ major	1794–95	violin, cello, keyboard	
XV:23	Piano Trio No. 37	D minor	1794–95	violin, cello, keyboard	
XV:24	Piano Trio No. 38	D major	1795	violin, cello, keyboard	
XV:25	Piano Trio No. 39	G major	1795	violin, cello, keyboard	
XV:26	Piano Trio No. 40	F♯ minor	1795	violin, cello, keyboard	
XV:27	Piano Trio No. 43	C major	1797 or before	violin, cello, keyboard	
XV:28	Piano Trio No. 44	E major	1797 or before	violin, cello, keyboard	
XV:29	Piano Trio No. 45	E♭ major	1797	violin, cello, keyboard	
XV:30	Piano Trio No. 42	E♭ major	1795	violin, cello, keyboard	
XV:31	Piano Trio No. 41	E♭ minor	1795	violin, cello, keyboard	
XV:32	Piano Trio No. 31	G major	1793–94	violin, cello, keyboard	
XV:33	Piano Trio No. 8	D major	1759 or before	violin, cello, keyboard	lost
XV:34	Piano Trio No. 11	E major	1759 or before	violin, cello, keyboard	
XV:35	Piano Trio No. 10	A major	1759 or before	violin, cello, keyboard	
XV:36	Piano Trio No. 12	E♭ major	c. 1760	violin, cello, keyboard	
XV:37	Piano Trio No. 1	F major	1766 or before	violin, cello, keyboard	
XV:38	Piano Trio No. 13	B♭ major	1766 or before	violin, cello, keyboard	
XV:39	Piano Trio No. 4	F major		violin, cello, keyboard	arrangement of other works
XV:40	Piano Trio No. 6	F major	1760 or before	violin, cello, keyboard	exists with a different slow movement as the piano concerto Hob. XVIII:7
XV:41	Piano Trio No. 7	G major	1767 or before	violin, cello, keyboard	
XV:C1	Piano Trio No. 2	C major		violin, cello, keyboard	doubtful; attributed to Georg Christoph Wagenseil
XV:C2	Piano Trio No. 16	C major		violin, cello, keyboard	doubtful
XV:D1	Piano Trio No. 9	D major		violin, cello, keyboard	doubtful; lost
XV:f1	Piano Trio No. 14	F minor		violin, cello, keyboard	doubtful

== Keyboard duos ==
Hob. No.	Title	Key	Date	Instrumentation	Notes
XVa:1	Sonata for keyboard and obbligato violin	B♭ major		keyboard, obbligato violin	
XVa:2	Sonata for keyboard and obbligato violin	D major		keyboard, obbligato violin	
XVa:3	Sonata for keyboard and obbligato violin	C major		keyboard, obbligato violin	

== Keyboard sonatas ==
Hob. No.	Title	Key	Date	Instrumentation	Notes
XVI:1	Keyboard sonata No. 1	C major	1760 or before		
XVI:2	Keyboard sonata No. 2	B♭ major	c. 1760		
XVI:2a	Divertimento	D minor	1767 or before		lost
XVI:2b	Divertimento	A major			lost
XVI:2c	Divertimento	B major			lost
XVI:2d	Divertimento	B♭ major			lost
XVI:2e	Divertimento	E minor			lost
XVI:2g	Divertimento	C major			lost
XVI:2h	Divertimento	A major			lost
XVI:3	Keyboard sonata No. 3	C major	1760 or before		
XVI:4	Keyboard sonata No. 4	D major	1760 or before		
XVI:5	Keyboard sonata No. 5	A major	1763 or before		authorship uncertain
XVI:6	Keyboard sonata No. 6	G major	1766 or before		
XVI:7	Keyboard sonata No. 7	C major	1766 or before		authorship uncertain
XVI:8	Keyboard sonata No. 8	G major	1766 or before		authorship uncertain
XVI:9	Keyboard sonata No. 9	F major	1766 or before		authorship uncertain
XVI:10	Keyboard sonata No. 10	C major	1767 or before		authorship uncertain
XVI:11	Keyboard sonata No. 11	G major	1767 or before		authorship uncertain
XVI:12	Keyboard sonata No. 12	A major	1767 or before		authorship uncertain
XVI:13	Keyboard sonata No. 13	E major	1767 or before		authorship uncertain
XVI:14	Keyboard sonata No. 14	D major	1767 or before		authorship uncertain
XVI:15	Keyboard sonata No. 15	C major	1765 or before		authorship uncertain, arranged from H. II:11
XVI:16	Keyboard sonata No. 16	E♭ major	1767		authorship uncertain
XVI:17	Keyboard sonata No. 17	B♭ major			spurious, actually by Johann Gottfried Schwanenberger
XVI:18	Keyboard sonata No. 18	B♭ major	c. 1767		
XVI:19	Keyboard sonata No. 19	D major	1767		
XVI:20	Keyboard sonata No. 20	C minor	c. 1771		
XVI:21	Keyboard sonata No. 21	C major	1773		
XVI:22	Keyboard sonata No. 22	E major	1773		
XVI:23	Keyboard sonata No. 23	F major	1773		
XVI:24	Keyboard sonata No. 24	D major	1773		
XVI:25	Keyboard sonata No. 25	E♭ major	1773		
XVI:26	Keyboard sonata No. 26	A major	1773		
XVI:27	Keyboard sonata No. 27	G major	c. 1774–76		
XVI:28	Keyboard sonata No. 28	E♭ major	1774–76		
XVI:29	Keyboard sonata No. 29	F major	c. 1774		
XVI:30	Keyboard sonata No. 30	A major	c. 1774–76		
XVI:31	Keyboard sonata No. 31	E major	c. 1774–76		
XVI:32	Keyboard sonata No. 32	B minor	1774–76		
XVI:33	Keyboard sonata No. 33	D major	c. 1777		
XVI:34	Keyboard sonata No. 34	E minor	1778 or before		
XVI:35	Keyboard sonata No. 35	C major	1780 or before		
XVI:36	Keyboard sonata No. 36	C♯ minor	1780 or before		
XVI:37	Keyboard sonata No. 37	D major	1780 or before		
XVI:38	Keyboard sonata No. 38	E♭ major	1780 or before		
XVI:39	Keyboard sonata No. 39	G major	1780 or before		
XVI:40	Keyboard sonata No. 40	G major	1784		
XVI:41	Keyboard sonata No. 41	B♭ major	1784		
XVI:42	Keyboard sonata No. 42	D major	1784		
XVI:43	Keyboard sonata No. 43	A♭ major	1783 or before		
XVI:44	Keyboard sonata No. 44	G minor	1765–67		
XVI:45	Keyboard sonata No. 45	E♭ major	1765–67		
XVI:46	Keyboard sonata No. 46	A♭ major	1765–67		
XVI:47	Keyboard sonata No. 47	F major	c. 1765–67		authorship uncertain
XVI:48	Keyboard sonata No. 48	C major	1789 or before		
XVI:49	Keyboard sonata No. 49	E♭ major	1789–90		
XVI:50	Keyboard sonata No. 50	C major	1794–95		
XVI:51	Keyboard sonata No. 51	D major	1794		
XVI:52	Keyboard sonata No. 52	E♭ major	1794		
XVI:G1		G major			authorship doubtful
XVI:deest		D major			

== Keyboard pieces ==
Hob. No.	Title	Key	Date	Instrumentation	Notes
XVII:1	Capriccio	G major	1765		
XVII:2	Twenty Variations in G major	G major	1771 or before		
XVII:3	Variations in E♭ major	E♭ major	1774 or before		
XVII:4	Fantasia in C major	C major	1789		
XVII:5	Variations in C major	C major	1790		
XVII:6	Variations in F minor	F minor	1793		
XVII:7	Variations in D major	D major	1766 or before		
XVII:8	Variations in D major	D major			uncertain
XVII:9	Adagio	F major			
XVII:10	Allegretto	G major			Arranged from Hob. XIX:27; uncertain
XVII:11	Nouvelle Andante pour le Clavecin No. 2	B♭ major			uncertain
XVII:12	Variations in B♭ major	B♭ major			uncertain
XVII:Anh.	12 Easy pieces				

== Keyboard for 4 hands ==
Hob. No.	Title	Key	Date	Instrumentation	Notes
XVIIa:1	Il Maestro e lo Scolaro	F major	1778 or before	Keyboard for 4 hands	
XVIIa:2	Partita	F major	Unknown	Keyboard for 4 hands	

== Keyboard concertos ==
Hob. No.	Title	Key	Date	Instrumentation	Notes
XVIII:1	Keyboard Concerto No. 1	C major	1756	Keyboard, orchestra	
XVIII:2	Keyboard Concerto No. 2	D major	1767 or before	Keyboard, orchestra	
XVIII:3	Keyboard Concerto No. 3	F major	c. 1765	Keyboard, strings	
XVIII:4	Keyboard Concerto No. 4	G major	1770	Keyboard, orchestra	
XVIII:5	Keyboard Concerto No. 5	C major	1763 or before	Keyboard, strings	uncertain, perhaps to be attributed to Georg Christoph Wagenseil
XVIII:6	Keyboard and Violin Concerto No. 6	F major	1766 or before	Keyboard, violin, strings	
XVIII:7	Keyboard Concerto No. 7	F major	1766 or before	Keyboard, strings	exists with a different slow movement as the piano trio Hob. XV:40; uncertain, perhaps to be attributed to Georg Christoph Wagenseil
XVIII:8	Keyboard Concerto No. 8	C major	1766 or before	Keyboard, orchestra	uncertain, perhaps to be attributed to Leopold Hofmann
XVIII:9	Keyboard Concerto No. 9	G major	1767 or before	Keyboard, strings	uncertain
XVIII:10	Keyboard Concerto No. 10	C major	1771 or before	Keyboard, strings	
XVIII:11	Keyboard Concerto No. 11	D major	published 1784	Keyboard, orchestra	

== Pieces for mechanical clock ==
Hob. No.	Title	Key	Date	Instrumentation	Notes
XIX:1	Allegretto	F major	1772	Keyboard (organ)	Arranged from Hob. XXVIII:7
XIX:2	Vivace	F major	1772	Keyboard (organ)	uncertain
XIX:3	Andantino	F major	1772	Keyboard (organ)	Arranged from Hob. I:53
XIX:4	Andante cantabile ("Der Dudelsack")	C major	1772	Keyboard (organ)	uncertain
XIX:5	Minuet	F major	1772	Keyboard (organ)	Arranged from Hob. XI:82
XIX:6	Vivace ("Der Kaffeeklatsch")	F major	1772	Keyboard (organ)	Arranged from Hob. XI:76
XIX:7	Minuet	C major	1772–92	Keyboard (organ)	uncertain
XIX:8	Minuet ("Der Wachtelschlag")	C major	1772–92	Keyboard (organ)	
XIX:9	Minuet, Allegretto	C major	1772–92	Keyboard (organ)	Arranged from Hob. III:57
XIX:10	Andante	C major	1772–92	Keyboard (organ)	
XIX:11	Allegretto	C major	1772–93	Keyboard (organ)	
XIX:12	Andante	C major	1772–93	Keyboard (organ)	
XIX:13	Vivace	C major	1772–93	Keyboard (organ)	
XIX:14	Minuet	C major	1772–93	Keyboard (organ)	
XIX:15	Allegro ma non troppo	C major	1772	Keyboard (organ)	
XIX:16	Fugue: Allegro	C major	1772–93	Keyboard (organ)	
XIX:17	Allegro moderato	C major	1792	Keyboard (organ)	
XIX:18	Presto	C major	1792	Keyboard (organ)	
XIX:19	Andante	C major	1792	Keyboard (organ)	Arranged from Hob. XXVIa:13
XIX:20	Minuet	C major	1792	Keyboard (organ)	Arranged from Hob. I:85
XIX:21	Allegretto	G major	1792	Keyboard (organ)	uncertain
XIX:22	Allegro moderato	C major	1792	Keyboard (organ)	uncertain
XIX:23	Vivace	C major	1792	Keyboard (organ)	Arranged from Hob. I:C6; uncertain
XIX:24	Presto	C major	1792	Keyboard (organ)	uncertain
XIX:25	March	D major	1793	Keyboard (organ)	Arranged from Hob. VIII:6
XIX:26	Andante-Allegro	E major	1793	Keyboard (organ)	uncertain
XIX:27	Allegretto	G major	1793	Keyboard (organ)	Later arranged as Hob. XVII:10
XIX:28	Allegro	C major	1793	Keyboard (organ)	Arranged from Hob. III:70
XIX:29	Minuet	C major	1793	Keyboard (organ)	Arranged from Hob. I:101
XIX:30	Presto	G major	1793	Keyboard (organ)	Arranged from Hob. III:63
XIX:31	Presto	C major	1793	Keyboard (organ)	
XIX:32	Allegro	F major	1793	Keyboard (organ)	Arranged from Hob. I:99

== Versions of The Seven Last Words of Christ ==
Hob. No.	Title	Key	Date	Instrumentation	Notes
XX:1	The Seven Last Words of Christ orchestral version		1786	orchestra	7 sonatas with sinfonia and an earthquake
XX:2	The Seven Last Words of Christ string quartet version		1787	string quartet	revised version of H. XX:1
XX:3	The Seven Last Words of Christ piano version		1787	piano	revised version of H. XX:1
XX:4	The Seven Last Words of Christ choral version		1796	SATB soloists, mixed choir, orchestra	revised version of H. XX:1

== Stabat Mater ==
Hob. No.	Title	Key	Date	Instrumentation	Notes
XXa:1	Stabat Mater	G minor	1767	SATB soloists, mixed choir, orchestra	

== Oratorios ==
Hob. No.	Title	Key	Date	Instrumentation	Notes
XXI:1	Il ritorno di Tobia	C minor	1775	SSATB soloists, mixed choir, orchestra	revised in 1784 and 1806 by Sigismund von Neukomm with Haydn's consent
XXI:2	The Creation		1798	STB soloists, mixed choir, orchestra	
XXI:3	The Seasons		1801	STB soloists, mixed choir, orchestra	

== Masses ==
Hob. No.	Title	Key	Date	Instrumentation	Notes
XXII:1	Missa Brevis	F major	c. 1750	2 Sopranos, mixed choir, strings	
XXII:2	Missa sunt bona mixta malis	D minor	1770 or before	mixed choir a capella	fragment
XXII:3	Missa rorate coeli desuper	G major	c. 1750	2 sopranos, mixed choir, strings	
XXII:4	Große Orgelmesse, Missa Cellensis in honorem Beatissimae Virginis Mariae	E♭ major	c. 1766	SATB soloists, mixed choir, orchestra	
XXII:5	Missa Cellensis in honorem Beatissimae Virginis Mariae	C major	1766	SATB soloists, mixed choir, orchestra	
XXII:6	Missa Sancti Nicolai Nicolaimesse	G major	1772	SATB soloists, mixed choir, orchestra	
XXII:7	Missa brevis Sancti Joannis de Deo Kleine Orgelmesse	B♭ major	1778 or before	Soprano, mixed choir, orchestra	
XXII:8	Missa Cellensis Mariazellermesse	C major	1782	SATB soloists, mixed choir, orchestra	
XXII:9	Mass in time of war Paukenmesse	C major	1796	SATB soloists, mixed choir, orchestra	
XXII:10	Missa Sancti Bernardi von Offida Heiligmesse	B♭ major	1796	SSATBB soloists, mixed choir, orchestra	
XXII:11	Missa in Angustiis Nelson Mass	D minor	1798	SATB soloists, mixed choir, orchestra	
XXII:12	Theresienmesse	B♭ major	1799	SATB soloists, mixed choir, orchestra	
XXII:13	Schöpfungsmesse	B♭ major	1801	SATB soloists, mixed choir, orchestra	
XXII:14	Harmoniemesse	B♭ major	1802	SATB soloists, mixed choir, orchestra	

== Requiem ==
Hob. No.	Title	Key	Date	Instrumentation	Notes
XXIIa:Es11	Requiem	E♭ major			doubtful
XXIIa:Es13	Requiem	E♭ major			doubtful
XXIIa:B2	Requiem	B♭ major			doubtful

== Libera me ==
Hob. No.	Title	Key	Date	Instrumentation	Notes
XXIIb:1	Libera me	F major	c. 1790	mixed choir, strings	uncertain

== Other sacred works ==
Hob. No.	Title	Key	Date	Instrumentation	Notes
XXIIIa:1	Motet: Non nobis Domine	D minor	c. 1799	Mixed choir	
XXIIIa:2	Motet: Animae Deo gratae	C major	1776 or before	Soprano, Mixed Choir, Orchestra	
XXIIIa:3	Hymne (Offertorium): Ens aeternum attende votis	G major	1772 or before	Mixed Choir, orchestra	
XXIIIa:4	Motet di Saneta Thecla: Quis stella radius	C major	c. 1762	Soprano, Mixed Choir, Organ, Strings	
XXIIIa:5	Offertorium: Ad aras eonvolate	G major	c. 1780	Mixed choir, orchestra	uncertain
XXIIIa:6	Motet: Salus et Gloria	C major	1779 or before	Mixed choir, orchestra	Uncertain attribution, probably by Leopold Hofmann
XXIIIa:7	Motet de Tempore: Super flumina Babylonis	C major	1772 or before	Solo Alto, Soprano, Tenor, Bass, Orchestra	Uncertain attribution, probably by Johann Baptist Wanhal
XXIIIa:8	Offertorium: Ardentes seraphini	A major	1786 or before	2 Sopranos, Alto, Strings	uncertain
XXIIIa:a1	Ave Maria	B-flat major		SATB	uncertain
XXIIIb:1	Salve Regina	E major	1756	Soprano, Mixed Choir, Strings	
XXIIIb:2	Salve Regina	G minor	1771	SATB Soloists, Mixed Choir, Organ, Strings	
XXIIIb:3	Ave Regina	A major	c. 1763	Soprano, Mixed Choir, Organ, 2 Violins	
XXIIIb:4	Salve Regina	E♭ major	1770 or before	Mixed Choir, Organ, Strings	
XXIIIb:5	Salve Regina	G major	c. 1776	Soprano, Alto, Organ, Strings	Probably to be attributed to J. Heyda
XXIIIb:6	Ave Regina	F major	1782 or before	Mixed Choir, Organ, Orchestra	uncertain
XXIIIc:1	Te Deum	C major	1765 or before	SATB Soloists, Mixed Choir, Organ, Orchestra	
XXIIIc:2	Te Deum	C major	1800 or before	Mixed Choir, Organ, Orchestra	
XXIIIc:3	Alleluia	G major	1768–71	Mixed Choir, Organ, Strings	
XXIIIc:4a-d	4 Responsoria de Venerabili		c. 1768	Mixed Choir, 2 Horns, Organ, Strings	
XXIIIc:5a-d	4 Hymnen de Venerabili		c. 1760	Mixed Choir, Organ, Orchestra	
XXIIIc:6	Aria de Venera: Lauda Sion	F major	c. 1760	Alto, 2 Flutes, Organ, 2 Violins, Viola	
XXIIId:1	Cantilena pro Adventu: Ein' Magd, ein' Dienerin	A major	c. 1770	Soprano, 2 Horns, Organ, Strings	
XXIIId:2	Aria de Adventu: Mutter Gottes mir erlaube	G major	c. 1770	Soprano, Alto, Organ, Strings	
XXIIId:3	Cantilena pro Adventu: Jesu Redemptor	D major		Soprano, 2 Horns, Organ, Strings	
XXIII:suppl.	6 Psalms		c. 1794	SAB Choir	

== Cantatas and arias with orchestra ==
Hob. No.	Title	Key	Date	Instrumentation	Notes
XXIVa:1	Vivan gl'illustri sposi			Mixed Choir, Orchestra	lost
XXIVa:2	Destatevi, o miei fidi	G major	1763	2 Sopranos, Tenor, Mixed Choir (SSTB), Orchestra	to celebrate the name day (December 6) of Prince Nicolaus Esterhazy
XXIVa:3	Al tuo arrivo felice	C major	1764	Soprano, Mixed Choir, Orchestra	to celebrate the return of Prince Nicolaus Esterhazy from Paris and Frankfurt/Main
XXIVa:4	Qual dubbio o(r)mai	A major	1764	Soprano, Mixed Choir, Orchestra	to celebrate the name day (December 6) of Prince Nicolaus Esterhazy
XXIVa:5	Dei clementi			Mixed Choir, Orchestra	lost
XXIVa:6	Applausus	C major	1768	SATBB soloists, mixed choir, orchestra	
XXIVa:7	Miseri noi, misera Patria	E♭ major	1790 or before	Soprano, Orchestra	
XXIVa:8	Der Sturm	D minor	1792	SATB Soloists, Mixed Choir, Orchestra	
XXIVa:9	Unfinished Oratorio	D minor	1794	Bass, Mixed Choir, Orchestra	
XXIVa:10	Berenice, che fai?	D major	1795	Soprano, Orchestra	
XXIVa:11	Die Erwählung eines Kapellmeisters	C major	c. 1796	SAT Soloists, Mixed Choir, Orchestra	uncertain
XXIVa:Anh.2	Denk ich Gott an deine Güte	G major	1794	Mixed Choir, Orchestra	Spurious by Johann Abraham Peter Schulz; Arrangement of movement II from H.I:104
XXIVb:1	Aria: Costretta piangere dolente	E♭ major	1762 or before	Soprano, Orchestra	
XXIVb:2	Aria: D'una sposa meschineIla	C major	c. 1777	Soprano, Orchestra	
XXIVb:3	Aria: Quando la rosa	G major	1779	Soprano, Orchestra	
XXIVb:4	Aria: Il cor nel seno balzarmi sento	C major	1780	Soprano, Orchestra	lost text
XXIVb:5	Aria: Dice benissimo, chi si marita	E♭ major	1780	Bass, 2 Horns, Strings	
XXIVb:6	Recit: Mora l'infido; Aria: Mi sento nel seno	B♭ major	1781	Soprano, Strings	incomplete; uncertain
XXIVb:7	Aria: Signor, voi sapete	B♭ major	1785	Soprano, Orchestra	
XXIVb:8	Aria: Dica pure chi vuol dir	G major	c. 1785	Soprano, Orchestra	
XXIVb:9	Cavatina: Sono Alcina e sono ancora	F major	1786	Soprano, Orchestra	
XXIVb:10	Recit: Ah, tu non senti, amico; Aria: Qual destra omicida	B♭ major	1786	Tenor, Orchestra	
XXIVb:11	Aria: Un cor si tenero	G major	1787	Bass, Orchestra	
XXIVb:12	Aria: Vada adagio, Signorina	B♭ major	1787	Soprano, Orchestra	
XXIVb:13	Aria: Chi vive amante	B♭ major	1787	Soprano, Orchestra	
XXIVb:14	Aria: Se tu mi sprezzi, ingrata	F major	1788	Tenor, Orchestra	
XXIVb:15	Aria: Infelice, sventurata	E♭ major	1789	Soprano, Orchestra	
XXIVb:16	Aria: Da che penso a maritarmi	E♭ major	1790	Tenor, Orchestra	
XXIVb:16a	Entracte:	E♭ major	1790	Tenor, Orchestra	lost text; uncertain
XXIVb:17	Aria: Il meglio mio carattere	E♭ major	1790	Soprano, Orchestra	
XXIVb:18	Aria: La moglie quando è buona	E♭ major	1790	Soprano, Orchestra	
XXIVb:19	Aria: La mia pace, oh Dio	B♭ major	1790	Soprano, Orchestra	
XXIVb:20	Aria: Solo e pensoso	B♭ major	1798	Soprano, Orchestra	
XXIVb:21	Aria:	C major	1788	Soprano, Orchestra	lost text; uncertain
XXIVb:22	Aria: Tornate pur mia bella	E♭ major		Tenor, Orchestra	
XXIVb:23	Aria: Via siate bonino	B♭ major		Soprano, Orchestra	

== Songs with 2, 3, and 4 parts ==
Hob. No.	Title	Key	Date	Instrumentation	Notes
XXVa:1	Guarda qui, che lo vedrai	F major	1796	Soprano, Tenor, Keyboard	
XXVa:2	Saper vorrei se m'ami	G major	1796	Soprano, Tenor, Keyboard	
XXVb:1	An den Vetter	G major	1799 or before	Soprano, Alto, Tenor, Keyboard	
XXVb:2	Daphnens einziger Fehler	C major	1799 or before	2 Tenors, Bass, Keyboard	
XXVb:3	Betrachtung des Todes	C major	1799 or before	Soprano, Tenor, Bass, Keyboard	
XXVb:4	An die Frauen	F major	1799 or before	2 Tenors, Bass, Keyboard	
XXVb:5	Pietà di me, benigni Dei	B♭ major		2 Sopranos, Tenor, Orchestra	uncertain
XXVc:1	Der Augenblick	A major	1796–99	Soprano, Alto, Tenor, Bass, Keyboard	
XXVc:2	Die Harmonie in der Ehe	B♭ major	1796–99	Soprano, Alto, Tenor, Bass, Keyboard	
XXVc:3	Alles hat seine Zeit	F major	1796–99	Soprano, Alto, Tenor, Bass, Keyboard	
XXVc:4	Die Beredsamkeit	B♭ major	1796–99	Soprano, Alto, Tenor, Bass, Keyboard	
XXVc:5	Der Greis	B♭ major	1796–99	Soprano, Alto, Tenor, Bass, Keyboard	
XXVc:6	Die Warnung	B♭ major	1796–99	Soprano, Alto, Tenor, Bass, Keyboard	
XXVc:7	Wider den Übermut	A major	1796–99	Soprano, Alto, Tenor, Bass, Keyboard	
XXVc:8	Aus dem Danklied zu Gott	E♭ major	1796–99	Soprano, Alto, Tenor, Bass, Keyboard	
XXVc:9	Abendlied zu Gott	E major	1796–99	Soprano, Alto, Tenor, Bass, Keyboard	

== Lieder with keyboard and cantatas with instruments ==
Hob. No.	Title	Key	Date	Instrumentation	Notes
XXVIa:1	Das strickende Mädchen	B♭ major	1781	Voice, Keyboard	
XXVIa:2	Cupido	E major	1781	Voice, Keyboard	
XXVIa:3	Der erste Kuß	E♭ major	1781	Voice, Keyboard	
XXVIa:4	Eine sehr gewöhnliche Geschichte	G major	1781	Voice, Keyboard	
XXVIa:5	Der Verlassene	G minor	1781	Voice, Keyboard	
XXVIa:6	Der Gleichsinn	A major	1781	Voice, Keyboard	
XXVIa:7	An Iris	B♭ major	1781	Voice, Keyboard	
XXVIa:8	An Thyrsis	D major	1781	Voice, Keyboard	
XXVIa:9	Trost unglücklicher Liebe	F minor	1781	Voice, Keyboard	
XXVIa:10	Die Landlust	C major	1781	Voice, Keyboard	
XXVIa:11	Liebeslied	D major	1781	Voice, Keyboard	
XXVIa:12	Die zu späte Ankunft der Mutter	E♭ major	1781	Voice, Keyboard	
XXVIa:13	Jeder meint, der Gegenstand	F major	1784	Voice, Keyboard	
XXVIa:14	Lachet nicht, Mädchen	B♭ major	1784	Voice, Keyboard	
XXVIa:15	O liebes Mädchen, höre mich,	G major	1784	Voice, Keyboard	
XXVIa:16	Gegenliebe	G major	1784	Voice, Keyboard	
XXVIa:17	Geistliches Lied	G minor	1784	Voice, Keyboard	
XXVIa:18	Auch die sprödeste der Schönen	F major	1784	Voice, Keyboard	
XXVIa:19	O fließ, ja wallend fließ in Zähren	E major	1784	Voice, Keyboard	
XXVIa:20	Zufriedenheit	C major	1784	Voice, Keyboard	
XXVIa:21	Das Leben ist ein Traum	E♭ major	1784	Voice, Keyboard	
XXVIa:22	Lob der Faulheit	A minor	1784	Voice, Keyboard	
XXVIa:23	Minna	A major	1784	Voice, Keyboard	
XXVIa:24	Auf meines Vaters Grab	E major	1784	Voice, Keyboard	
XXVIa:25	The Mermaid's Song	C major	1794	Voice, Keyboard	
XXVIa:26	Recollection	F major	1794	Voice, Keyboard	
XXVIa:27	A Pastoral Song	A major	1794	Voice, Keyboard	also referred to as Shepherd's Song
XXVIa:28	Despair	E major	1794	Voice, Keyboard	
XXVIa:29	Pleasing Pain	G major	1794	Voice, Keyboard	
XXVIa:30	Fidelity	F minor	1794	Voice, Keyboard	
XXVIa:31	Sailor's Song	A major	1794–95	Voice, Keyboard	
XXVIa:32	The Wanderer	G minor	1794–95	Voice, Keyboard	
XXVIa:33	Sympathy	E major	1794–95	Voice, Keyboard	
XXVIa:34	She never told her love	A♭ major	1794–95	Voice, Keyboard	
XXVIa:35	Piercing eyes	G major	1794–95	Voice, Keyboard	
XXVIa:36	Content	A major	1794–95	Voice, Keyboard	also referred to as The Transport of Pleasure
XXVIa:37	Beim Schmerz der dieses Herz durchwühlt	E major		Voice, Keyboard	
XXVIa:38	Der schlaue Pudel	B♭ major	c. 1780	Voice, Keyboard	
XXVIa:39	Trachten will ich nicht auf Erden	E major	1790	Voice, Keyboard	
XXVIa:40	Der Feldzug	E major	1790	Voice, Keyboard	lost
XXVIa:41	The Spirit's Song	F minor		Voice, Keyboard	
XXVIa:42	O tuneful Voice	E♭ major		Voice, Keyboard	
XXVIa:43	Kaiserlied	G major	1797	Voice, Keyboard	
XXVIa:44	Als einst mit Weibes Schönheit	A major		Voice, Keyboard	
XXVIa:45	Ein kleines Haus	E major	1801	Voice, Keyboard	
XXVIa:46	Vergiß mein nicht	G major	c. 1796	Voice, Keyboard	also referred to as Antwort auf die Frage eines Mädchens
XXVIa:47	Bald wehen uns des Frühlings Lüfte	G major		Voice, Keyboard	
XXVIa:48a	Ich liebe, du liebest, er liebet	E♭ major		Voice, Keyboard	lost
XXVIa:48b	Dürre, Staub, vermorschte Knochen	B♭ major		Voice, Keyboard	lost
XXVIa:48c	Sag'n allweil vom Staatsleb'n	C major		Voice, Keyboard	lost
XXVIa:48d	Kein besseres Leben ist ja auf der Welt	G major		Voice, Keyboard	lost
XXVIa:D1	Liebes Mädchen hör mir zu	D major		Voice, Keyboard	authorship doubtful.
XXVIa:G1	A prey to tender anguish	G major		Voice, Keyboard	authorship doubtful.
XXVIb:1	Deutschlands Klage auf den Tod des grossen; Friedrichs Borussens König	E♭ major	1776	Voice, Baryton	lost
XXVIb:2	Arianna a Naxos	E♭ major	1789 or before	Soprano, Keyboard	
XXVIb:3	Dr. Har(r)ingtons Compliment	A major	c. 1794	Soprano, Mixed Choir (SSTB), Keyboard	
XXVIb:4	Lines from the battle of the Nile	C minor	1800	Soprano, Keyboard	

== Sacred and secular canons ==
Hob. No.	Title	Key	Date	Instrumentation	Notes
XXVIIa:1	Du sollst an einen Gott glauben	C major	1791	3 voices	Die X Gebothe Gottes
XXVIIa:2	Du sollst den Namen Gottes nicht eitel nennen	G major	1791	3 voices	Die X Gebothe Gottes
XXVIIa:3	Du sollst Sonn- und Feiertag heiligen	B♭ major	1791	3 voices	Die X Gebothe Gottes
XXVIIa:4	Du sollst Vater und Mutter verehren	E♭ major	1791	3 voices	Die X Gebothe Gottes
XXVIIa:5	Du sollst nicht töten	B♭ major	1791	3 voices	Die X Gebothe Gottes
XXVIIa:6	Du sollst nicht Unkeuschheit treiben	C major	1791	3 voices	Die X Gebothe Gottes
XXVIIa:7	Du sollst nicht stehlen	A minor	1791	3 voices	Die X Gebothe Gottes
XXVIIa:8	Du sollst kein falsch Zeugnis geben	E major	1791	3 voices	Die X Gebothe Gottes
XXVIIa:9	Du sollst nicht begehren deines Nächsten Weib	C major	1791	3 voices	Die X Gebothe Gottes
XXVIIa:10	Du sollst nicht begehren, deines Nächsten Gut	A♭ major	1791	3 voices	Die X Gebothe Gottes
XXVIIb:1	Hilar an Narziss	G major		3 voices	
XXVIIb:2	Auf einen adeligen Dummkopf	E♭ major		3 voices	
XXVIIb:3	Der Schuster bleib bei seinem Leist	F major		8 voices	
XXVIIb:4	Herr von Gänsewitz zu seinem Kammerdiener	C minor		4 voices	
XXVIIb:5	An den Marull	F major		5 voices	
XXVIIb:6	Die Mutter an ihr Kind in der Wiege	E♭ major		3 voices	
XXVIIb:7	Der Menschenfreund	E♭ major		4 voices	
XXVIIb:8	Gottes Macht und Vorsehung	G major		3 voices	
XXVIIb:9	An Dorilis	F major		4 voices	
XXVIIb:10	Vixi	B♭ major		3 voices	
XXVIIb:11	Der Kobold	E♭ major		4 voices	
XXVIIb:12	Der Fuchs und der Marder	A minor		4 voices	
XXVIIb:13	Abschied	B♭ major		5 voices	
XXVIIb:14	Die Hofstellungen	B minor		3 voices	
XXVIIb:15	Aus Nichts wird Nichts	C major		5 voices	
XXVIIb:16	Cacatum non est pictum	A major		4 voices	
XXVIIb:17	Tre cose	E♭ major		3 voices	
XXVIIb:18	Vergebliches Glück	A major		2 voices	
XXVIIb:19	Grabschrift	G minor		4 voices	
XXVIIb:20	Das Reitpferd	E♭ major		3 voices	
XXVIIb:21	Tod und Schlaf	A♭ major		4 voices	
XXVIIb:22	An einen Geizigen	D major		3 voices	
XXVIIb:23	Das böse Weib	G major		3 voices	
XXVIIb:23bis	Das böse Weib	A minor		3 voices	
XXVIIb:24	Der Verlust	E major		3 voices	
XXVIIb:25	Der Freigeist	G major		3 voices	
XXVIIb:26	Die Liebe der Feinde	A major		2 voices	
XXVIIb:27	Der Furchtsame	C minor		3 voices	
XXVIIb:28	Die Gewissheit	E♭ major		4 voices	
XXVIIb:29	Phoebus und sein Sohn	G major		4 voices	
XXVIIb:30	Die Tulipane	G major		2 voices	
XXVIIb:31	Das größte Gut	A minor		3 voices	
XXVIIb:32	Der Hirsch	D minor		5 voices	
XXVIIb:33	Überschrift eines Weinhauses	E major		4 voices	
XXVIIb:34	Der Esel und die Dohle	C major		8 voices	
XXVIIb:35	Schalksnarren	B♭ major		6 voices	
XXVIIb:36	Zweierlei Feinde	F major		3 voices	
XXVIIb:37	Der Bäcker und die Maus	D minor		5 voices	
XXVIIb:38	Die Flinte und der Hase	G major		4 voices	
XXVIIb:39	Der Nachbar	G minor		4 voices	
XXVIIb:40	Liebe zur Kunst	G major		4 voices	
XXVIIb:41	Frag und Antwort zweier Fuhrleute; die Welt	G minor		5 voices	
XXVIIb:42	Der Fuchs und der Adler	C major		3 voices	
XXVIIb:43	Wunsch	G minor		4 voices	
XXVIIb:44	Gott im Herzen, ein Weib im Arm	F major		3 voices	
XXVIIb:45	Turk was a faithful dog	B♭ major		4 voices	
XXVIIb:46	Thy voice, o Harmony, is divine	C major		3 voices	
XXVIIb:47	no lyrics	G major		7 voices	

== Operas ==
Hob. No.	Title	Key	Date	Instrumentation	Notes
XXVIII:1	Acide e Galatea	C major	1763	SSATB, orchestra	1 act
XXVIII:2	La canterina		1766	SSST, orchestra	2 acts
XXVIII:3	Lo speziale	G major	1768	SSTT, orchestra	3 acts
XXVIII:4	Le pescatrici	D major	1770	SAATTB soloists, mixed choir, orchestra	3 acts
XXVIII:5	L'infedeltà delusa	C major	1773	SSTTB, orchestra	2 acts
XXVIII:6	L'incontro improvviso		1775	SSSTTB Soloists, mixed choir, orchestra	3 acts
XXVIII:7	Il mondo della luna		1777	SSSATTB soloists, mixed choir, orchestra	3 acts
XXVIII:8	La vera costanza		1779	SSSTTTB, orchestra	3 acts
XXVIII:8a	Laurette		1791	SSSTTTB, orchestra	3 acts; French version of La vera costanza
XXVIII:9	L'isola disabitata		1779, rev. 1802	SSTB, orchestra	2 acts
XXVIII:10	La fedeltà premiata	D major	1781	SSSSTTBB, orchestra	3 acts
XXVIII:10bis	L'infedeltà fedele		1779	9 voices, orchestra	3 acts; actually by Domenico Cimarosa
XXVIII:11	Orlando paladino		1782	SSSTTTTBB soloists, mixed choir, orchestra	3 acts
XXVIII:12	Armida		1784	SSTTTB, orchestra	3 acts
XXVIII:13	L'anima del filosofo		1791	SSTBBB soloists, mixed choir, orchestra	4 acts

== Marionette operas and singspiele ==
Hob. No.	Title	Key	Date	Instrumentation	Notes
XXIXa:1	Philemon und Baucis		1773 or before	2 female voices, 2 male voices, 2 speaking parts, mixed choir, orchestra	Revised as Hob. XXIXb:2
XXIXa:1a	Prelude to No. 1 "Der Götterrath"	D major	1773 or before	Soloist, mixed choir, orchestra	Music lost
XXIXa:2	Der Hexenschabbas		1773		Music lost
XXIXa:3	Didone Abbandonata (Dido)		1776	7 people, mixed choir, orchestra	Music lost
XXIXa:4	Das abgebrannten Haus		c. 1779		Music lost
XXIXa:5	Genovevens vierter Theil		1777		Music lost
XXIXb:1a	Der krumme Teufel		c. 1751		Music lost
XXIXb:1b	Der neue krumme Teufel		1758 or before		Music lost
XXIXb:2	Philemon und Baucis	D minor	1776	2 sopranos, 2 tenors, 2 speaking parts, mixed choir, orchestra	After Hob. XXIXa:1
XXIXb:3	Die bestrafte Rachbegierde		1779		Music lost

== Incidental music ==
Hob. No.	Title	Key	Date	Instrumentation	Notes
XXX:1	Comedia la Marchesa Ne(s)pola		1762		Most of the music lost
XXX:2	Musik zum Schauspiel "Die Feuersbrunst"	Unknown	1774	Unknown	Uncertain. Music lost
XXX:3	Zwischenaktmusik zum Schauspiel "Der Zerstreute"	Unknown	1774	Unknown	Music lost
XXX:4	Musik zu einem Schauspiel		1793 or before	Soprano, orchestra	
XXX:5	Musik zum Schauspiel "Alfred oder der patriotische König"		1796		
XXX:5a	Chor der Dänen zu dem Schauspiel	C major		Mixed choir, orchestra	Chorus from Hob. XXX:5
XXX:5b	Arie des Schutzgeistes	E♭ major		Soprano, orchestra	Chorus from Hob. XXX:5
XXX:5c	Duet "Der Morgen graut"	F major		2 tenors, harp, strings	Duet from Hob. XXX:5

== Folksong arrangements ==
Hob. No.	Title	Key	Date	Instrumentation	Notes
XXXIa:1	Mary's Dream	F♯ minor		Voice, Violin, Cello, Keyboard	
XXXIa:1bis	Mary's Dream	F♯ minor		Voice, Keyboard	Alternate version
XXXIa:2	John Anderson, my Jo	G minor		Voice, Violin, Cello, Keyboard	
XXXIa:2bis	John Anderson, my Jo	G minor		Voice, Keyboard	Alternate version
XXXIa:3	I love my love in secret	G major		Voice, Violin, Cello, Keyboard	
XXXIa:4	Willie was a wanton wag	C major		Voice, Violin, Cello, Keyboard	
XXXIa:4bis	There was a lass and she was fair	D minor		Voice, Keyboard	
XXXIa:5	Saw ye my Father	D major		Voice, Violin, Cello, Keyboard	
XXXIa:5bis	Where are the joys I have met	D major		Voice, Keyboard	
XXXIa:5ter	Saw ye my Father	D major		Voice, Keyboard	Alternate version
XXXIa:6	Todlen hame	A major		Voice, Violin, Cello, Keyboard	
XXXIa:6bis	Todlen hame	A major		Voice, Keyboard	Alternate version
XXXIa:7	Fy gar rub her o'er wi' Strae	E minor		Voice, Violin, Cello, Keyboard	
XXXIa:7bis	Fy gar rub her o'er wi' Strae	E minor		2 Voices, Keyboard	Duet version
XXXIa:8	Green grow the Rashes	D minor		Voice, Violin, Cello, Keyboard	
XXXIa:8bis	Green grow the Rashes	B minor		Voice, Keyboard	Alternate version
XXXIa:9	The waefu' heart	F major		Voice, Violin, Cello, Keyboard	
XXXIa:9bis	The waefu' heart	F major		Voice, Keyboard	Alternate version
XXXIa:10	The Ploughman	D major		Voice, Violin, Cello, Keyboard	
XXXIa:11	Barbara Allen	D minor		Voice, Violin, Cello, Keyboard	
XXXIa:11bis	'Twas at the hour dark	C minor		Voice, Keyboard	
XXXIa:12	Thou'rt gane awa'	A major		Voice, Violin, Cello, Keyboard	also referred to as 'Had awa frae me, Donald'
XXXIa:12bis	Thou'rt gane awa'	A major		Voice, Keyboard	Alternate version; also referred to as 'Had awa frae me, Donald'
XXXIa:13	Gramachree	E♭ major		Voice, Violin, Cello, Keyboard	
XXXIa:13bis	One morning very early, one morning in the spring	D major		Voice, Keyboard	
XXXIa:13ter	One morning very early, one morning in the spring	F major		Voice, Keyboard	Alternate version
XXXIa:14	This is no mine ain house	B♭ major		Voice, Violin, Cello, Keyboard	
XXXIa:14bis	This is no mine ain house	B♭ major		Voice, Keyboard	Alternate version
XXXIa:15	Galla water	D major		Voice, Violin, Cello, Keyboard	
XXXIa:15bis	Galla water	D major		Voice, Keyboard	Alternate version
XXXIa:15ter	Galla water	D major		Voice, Keyboard	Alternate version
XXXIa:16	O'er Bogie	G minor		Voice, Violin, Cello, Keyboard	
XXXIa:16bis	Well I agree you'r sure of me	F-♯ minor		Voice, Keyboard	
XXXIa:17	I had a Horse	B minor		Voice, Violin, Cello, Keyboard	
XXXIa:17bis	O poortith cauld and restless love	C minor		Voice, Keyboard	
XXXIa:18	My Boy Tammy	D minor		Voice, Violin, Cello, Keyboard	
XXXIa:19	St. Kilda Song	F major		Voice, Violin, Cello, Keyboard	also referred to as 'By the stream so cool and clear'
XXXIa:20	The blythesome Bridal	D major		Voice, Violin, Cello, Keyboard	also referred to as 'Fy, Let us a' to the Bridal'
XXXIa:20bis	'Tis nae very lang sin syne	D major		Voice, Keyboard	
XXXIa:21	The Shepherd Adonis	G minor		Voice, Violin, Cello, Keyboard	
XXXIa:22	The White Cockade	D major		Voice, Violin, Cello, Keyboard	
XXXIa:22bis	The White Coekade	D major		Voice, Keyboard	Alternate version; attributed to Neukomm
XXXIa:23	The Lass of Livingston	C minor		Voice, Violin, Cello, Keyboard	
XXXIa:24	John of Badenyon	G minor		Voice, Violin, Cello, Keyboard	
XXXIa:24bis	John of Badenyon	G minor		Voice, Keyboard	Alternate version
XXXIa:25	The bonniest Lass in a' the Warld	D major		Voice, Violin, Cello, Keyboard	
XXXIa:26	Duncan Davison	C major		Voice, Violin, Cello, Keyboard	
XXXIa:27	Leader Haughs and Yarrow	F major		Voice, Violin, Cello, Keyboard	
XXXIa:28	Up in the morning early	G minor		Voice, Violin, Cello, Keyboard	
XXXIa:28bis	Up in the morning early	G minor		Voice, Keyboard	Alternate version
XXXIa:28ter	Up in the morning early	G minor		Voice, Keyboard	Alternate version
XXXIa:29	Fife and a' the lands about it	D major		Voice, Violin, Cello, Keyboard	
XXXIa:30	I'm o'er young to marry yet	B♭ major		Voice, Violin, Cello, Keyboard	
XXXIa:31	The lea-rig	F major		Voice, Violin, Cello, Keyboard	also referred to as 'My ain kind Dearie, O'
XXXIa:31bis	The lea-rig	G major		Voice, Keyboard	Alternate version
XXXIa:31ter	The lea-rig	G major		Voice, Keyboard	Alternate version
XXXIa:32	Dainty Davie	D major		Voice, Violin, Cello, Keyboard	
XXXIa:33	Pentland Hills	F major		Voice, Violin, Cello, Keyboard	
XXXIa:34	Duncan Gray	G major		Voice, Violin, Cello, Keyboard	
XXXIa:35	Maggy Lauder	B♭ major		Voice, Violin, Cello, Keyboard	
XXXIa:35bis	Maggy Lauder	A major		Voice, Keyboard	Alternate version
XXXIa:35ter	Maggy Lauder	B♭ major		Voice, Keyboard	Alternate version
XXXIa:36	How can I be sad on my Wedding Day	D major		Voice, Violin, Cello, Keyboard	
XXXIa:37	My Nanny O!	C minor		Voice, Violin, Cello, Keyboard	
XXXIa:37bis	Behind yon hill where Lugar flows	C minor		Voice, Keyboard	
XXXIa:37ter	My Nanny O!	C minor		Voice, Keyboard	Alternate version
XXXIa:37quater	My Nanny O!	C minor		2 Voices, Keyboard	Duet version
XXXIa:38	Woo'd and Married and a'	D minor		Voice, Violin, Cello, Keyboard	
XXXIa:38bis	No house in the village could stow them	F major		Voice, Keyboard	
XXXIa:39	Blue Bonnets	C major		Voice, Violin, Cello, Keyboard	
XXXIa:40	The Wawking of the Fauld	D major		Voice, Violin, Cello, Keyboard	
XXXIa:41	John, come kiss me now	E♭ major		Voice, Violin, Cello, Keyboard	
XXXIa:42	Mount your Baggage	C major		Voice, Violin, Cello, Keyboard	
XXXIa:43	Ye Gods! was Strephon's picture blest	D major		Voice, Violin, Cello, Keyboard	
XXXIa:44	Sleepy Bodie	F major		Voice, Violin, Cello, Keyboard	
XXXIa:45	The Gard'ner wi' his Paidle	A major		Voice, Violin, Cello, Keyboard	
XXXIa:46	The Brisk young Lad	G minor		Voice, Violin, Cello, Keyboard	
XXXIa:46bis	The pawky auld carle came o'er the lea	E minor		Voice, Keyboard	
XXXIa:47	Cumbernauld House	E♭ major		Voice, Violin, Cello, Keyboard	
XXXIa:48	O can you Sew Cushions	G major		Voice, Violin, Cello, Keyboard	
XXXIa:49	Heres a health to my true Love	B minor		Voice, Violin, Cello, Keyboard	
XXXIa:50	Merry may the Maid be	D minor		Voice, Violin, Cello, Keyboard	
XXXIa:50bis	Merry may the Maid be	D minor		2 Voices, Keyboard	Duet version
XXXIa:51	The Mucking of Geordie's Byne	E minor		Voice, Violin, Cello, Keyboard	
XXXIa:51bis	My heart is a breaking dear Titty	E minor		Voice, Keyboard	
XXXIa:52	Tibby Fowler	B minor		Voice, Violin, Cello, Keyboard	
XXXIa:52bis	Tibby Fowler	B minor		Voice, Keyboard	Alternate version; attributed to Neukomm
XXXIa:53	Love will find out the way	A major		Voice, Violin, Cello, Keyboard	
XXXIa:54	Be kind to the Young thing	B♭ major		Voice, Violin, Cello, Keyboard	
XXXIa:55	Cauld Kail in Aberdeen	D major		Voice, Violin, Cello, Keyboard	
XXXIa:55bis	How long and dreary is the night	D major		2 Voices, Keyboard	Duet
XXXIa:56	Saw ye my Peggy	D minor		Voice, Violin, Cello, Keyboard	
XXXIa:57	The banks of Spey	C major		Voice, Violin, Cello, Keyboard	
XXXIa:58	The birks of Abergeldie	D major		Voice, Violin, Cello, Keyboard	
XXXIa:58bis	The birks of Abergeldie	D major		Voice, Keyboard	Alternate version
XXXIa:59	The bonny brucket Lassie	D major		Voice, Violin, Cello, Keyboard	
XXXIa:60	The Soger Laddie	E♭ major		Voice, Violin, Cello, Keyboard	
XXXIa:60bis	Come rest ye here Johnie	E♭ major		Voice, Keyboard	
XXXIa:61	O let me in this ae night	D minor		Voice, Violin, Cello, Keyboard	
XXXIa:61bis	O let me in this ae night	D minor		Voice, Keyboard	Alternate version
XXXIa:62	When she came ben she bobet	E minor		Voice, Violin, Cello, Keyboard	
XXXIa:62bis	O was I to blame to love him	E minor		Voice, Keyboard	
XXXIa:63	Hallow ev'n	D major		Voice, Violin, Cello, Keyboard	
XXXIa:63bis	Hallow ev'n	D major		Voice, Keyboard	Alternate version; attributed to Neukomm
XXXIa:64	Young Jockey was the blythest Lad	A minor		Voice, Violin, Cello, Keyboard	
XXXIa:64bis	Young Jockey was the blythest Lad	A minor		Voice, Keyboard	Alternate version
XXXIa:65	Margret's Ghost	D major		Voice, Violin, Cello, Keyboard	
XXXIa:66	The Black Eagle	A major		Voice, Violin, Cello, Keyboard	
XXXIa:67	How long and dreary is the Night	D major		Voice, Violin, Cello, Keyboard	
XXXIa:68	Blink o'er the Burn, sweet Betty	B♭ major		Voice, Violin, Cello, Keyboard	
XXXIa:69	What ye wha I met yestreen	E♭ major		Voice, Violin, Cello, Keyboard	
XXXIa:69bis	What ye wha I met yestreen	E minor		Voice, Keyboard	Alternate version
XXXIa:70	My Mithers ay glowran o'er me	E minor		Voice, Violin, Cello, Keyboard	
XXXIa:70bis	My Mithers ay glowran o'er me	E minor		Voice, Keyboard	Alternate version
XXXIa:71	Young Damon	B♭ major		Voice, Violin, Cello, Keyboard	
XXXIa:72	Robin quo' she	G major		Voice, Violin, Cello, Keyboard	
XXXIa:72bis	Robin quo' she	G major		Voice, Keyboard	Alternate version
XXXIa:73	Logie of Buchan	G minor		Voice, Violin, Cello, Keyboard	
XXXIa:74	Eppie Adair	E minor		Voice, Violin, Cello, Keyboard	
XXXIa:75	Widow, are ye waking	E♭ major		Voice, Violin, Cello, Keyboard	
XXXIa:75bis	Widow, are ye waking	E♭ major		Voice, Keyboard	Alternate version
XXXIa:76	Whistle o'er the lave o't	F major		Voice, Violin, Cello, Keyboard	
XXXIa:76bis	Whistle o'er the lave o't	F major		Voice, Keyboard	Alternate version
XXXIa:77	My heart's in the Highlands	B♭ major		Voice, Violin, Cello, Keyboard	
XXXIa:78	Steer her up and had her gawin	B♭ major		Voice, Violin, Cello, Keyboard	
XXXIa:79	Jamie come try me	D major		Voice, Violin, Cello, Keyboard	
XXXIa:80	If a body meet a body	G major		Voice, Violin, Cello, Keyboard	also referred to as 'The Miller's Daughter'
XXXIa:80bis	If a body meet a body	G major		Voice, Keyboard	Alternate version; also referred to as 'The Miller's Daughter'
XXXIa:81	McGregor of Ruara's Lament	C major		Voice, Violin, Cello, Keyboard	also referred to as McGregor of Roro's Lament; Raving Winds around her blowing
XXXIa:81bis	My sorrow deep sorrow	C major		Voice, Keyboard	Attributed to Neukomm
XXXIa:82	Willy's Rare	B♭ major		Voice, Violin, Cello, Keyboard	
XXXIa:83	Lizae Baillie	F major		Voice, Violin, Cello, Keyboard	
XXXIa:84	The maid's Complaint	B minor		Voice, Violin, Cello, Keyboard	
XXXIa:85	Oh Onochrie	F major		Voice, Violin, Cello, Keyboard	
XXXIa:86	Maggie's Tocher	E minor		Voice, Violin, Cello, Keyboard	
XXXIa:87	I dream'd I lay	D minor		Voice, Violin, Cello, Keyboard	
XXXIa:88	The Glancing of her Apron	D major		Voice, Violin, Cello, Keyboard	
XXXIa:89	O bonny lass	E minor		Voice, Violin, Cello, Keyboard	
XXXIa:89bis	O say, my sweet Nan	E♭ major		Voice, Keyboard	
XXXIa:90	The Flowers of Edinburgh	E♭ major		Voice, Violin, Cello, Keyboard	
XXXIa:90bis	The Flowers of Edinburgh	F major		Voice, Keyboard	Alternate version
XXXIa:91	Jockie and Sandie	G major		Voice, Violin, Cello, Keyboard	
XXXIa:92	The mill, mill O	B♭ major		Voice, Violin, Cello, Keyboard	
XXXIa:92bis	When wild war's deadly blast was blown	B♭ major		Voice, Keyboard	
XXXIa:93	Shepherds, I have lost my love	D major		Voice, Violin, Cello, Keyboard	
XXXIa:93bis	Shepherds, I have lost my love	D major		Voice, Keyboard	Alternate version
XXXIa:94	Bonny Kate of Edinburgh	G major		Voice, Violin, Cello, Keyboard	
XXXIa:95	If e'er ye do well it's a Wonder	D major		Voice, Violin, Cello, Keyboard	
XXXIa:96	Peggy in Devotion	C major		Voice, Violin, Cello, Keyboard	
XXXIa:97	Colonel Gardner	B♭ major		Voice, Violin, Cello, Keyboard	
XXXIa:98	To Daunton me	D minor		Voice, Violin, Cello, Keyboard	
XXXIa:99	Jenny was Fair and unkind	E♭ major		Voice, Violin, Cello, Keyboard	
XXXIa:100	Her absence will not alter me	D major		Voice, Violin, Cello, Keyboard	
XXXIa:101	The Bonnie Grey ey'd Morn	B♭ major		Voice, Violin, Cello, Keyboard	
XXXIa:101bis	A soldier am I, all the world o'er I range	G major		Voice, Keyboard	
XXXIa:102	Bonnie Wee thing	A major		Voice, Violin, Cello, Keyboard	
XXXIa:102bis	Bonnie Wee thing	A major		Voice, Keyboard	Alternate version
XXXIa:102ter	Bonnie Wee thing	A major		Voice, Keyboard	Alternate version
XXXIa:102quater	Bonnie Wee thing	A major		Mixed choir (STB)	3 part version; uncertain
XXXIa:103	Roy's Wife of Alldivaloch	A minor		Voice, Violin, Cello, Keyboard	
XXXIa:104	While hopeless	E minor		Voice, Violin, Cello, Keyboard	
XXXIa:105	Frae the Friends and Land I love	E♭ major		Voice, Violin, Cello, Keyboard	
XXXIa:106	The Shepherd's son	G major		Voice, Violin, Cello, Keyboard	
XXXIa:106bis	The Shepherd's son	G major		Voice, Keyboard	Alternate version
XXXIa:106ter	The gowan glitters on the sword	A major		Voice, Keyboard	
XXXIa:107	A Cold Frosty Morning	F major		Voice, Violin, Cello, Keyboard	
XXXIa:108	O, For ane and twenty Tam!	C minor		Voice, Violin, Cello, Keyboard	
XXXIa:109	Johnie Armstrong	G major		Voice, Violin, Cello, Keyboard	
XXXIa:110	I do confess thou art sae fair	D minor		Voice, Violin, Cello, Keyboard	
XXXIa:111	Now Westlin Winds	C minor		Voice, Violin, Cello, Keyboard	
XXXIa:112	Green Sleeves	E minor		Voice, Violin, Cello, Keyboard	
XXXIa:112bis	It was the charming month of May	E minor		Voice, Keyboard	
XXXIa:113	The Posie	C minor		Voice, Violin, Cello, Keyboard	
XXXIa:114	As I cam down by yon Castle Wa'	E minor		Voice, Violin, Cello, Keyboard	
XXXIa:115	The Minstrel	C minor		Voice, Violin, Cello, Keyboard	Also referred to as Donocht head
XXXIa:115bis	The Minstrel	C minor		Voice, Keyboard	Alternate version
XXXIa:116	The Ewy wi' the crooked Horn	F major		Voice, Violin, Cello, Keyboard	
XXXIa:116bis	The Ewy wi' the crooked Horn	G major		Voice, Keyboard	Alternate version
XXXIa:117	Fair Eliza	E minor		Voice, Violin, Cello, Keyboard	
XXXIa:118	The Widow	E♭ major		Voice, Violin, Cello, Keyboard	
XXXIa:119	Yon Wild Mossy Mountains	G minor		Voice, Violin, Cello, Keyboard	
XXXIa:120	My Goddess Woman	C minor		Voice, Violin, Cello, Keyboard	
XXXIa:121	She's fair and fause	E minor		Voice, Violin, Cello, Keyboard	
XXXIa:122	O'er the Moor amang the Heather	E♭ major		Voice, Violin, Cello, Keyboard	
XXXIa:122bis	O'er the Moor amang the Heather	E♭ major		Voice, Keyboard	Alternate version; attributed to Neukomm
XXXIa:122ter	O'er the Moor amang the Heather	E♭ major		Voice, Keyboard	Alternate version
XXXIa:123	The Tears I shed	E minor		Voice, Violin, Cello, Keyboard	
XXXIa:124	The Wee Wee Man	E♭ major		Voice, Violin, Cello, Keyboard	
XXXIa:124bis	O bonny was yon rosy	E♭ major		Voice, Keyboard	
XXXIa:125	Nithsdall's Welcome home	D major		Voice, Violin, Cello, Keyboard	
XXXIa:126	Bid me not forget	G major		Voice, Violin, Cello, Keyboard	
XXXIa:127	Lady Randolph's Complaint	G major		Voice, Violin, Cello, Keyboard	
XXXIa:128	The Shepherd's Wife	E♭ major		Voice, Violin, Cello, Keyboard	
XXXIa:128bis	A! rosebud by my early walk	E♭ major		Voice, Keyboard	
XXXIa:129	The weary Pund o'Tow	G major		Voice, Violin, Cello, Keyboard	
XXXIa:129bis	The weary Pund o'Tow	F major		Voice, Keyboard	Alternate version
XXXIa:130	The tither morn	F major		Voice, Violin, Cello, Keyboard	
XXXIa:131	Ae fond Kiss	E minor		Voice, Violin, Cello, Keyboard	
XXXIa:132	Jenny drinks nae water	B♭ major		Voice, Violin, Cello, Keyboard	
XXXIa:133	The Vain Pursuit	C major		Voice, Violin, Cello, Keyboard	
XXXIa:134	What can a young Lassie do	B minor		Voice, Violin, Cello, Keyboard	
XXXIa:134bis	What can a young Lassie do	B minor		Voice, Keyboard	Alternate version
XXXIa:135	The Rose Bud	G minor		Voice, Violin, Cello, Keyboard	
XXXIa:136	Dear Silvia	E♭ major		Voice, Violin, Cello, Keyboard	
XXXIa:137	The Slave's Lament	D minor		Voice, Violin, Cello, Keyboard	
XXXIa:138	The Death of the Linnet	E♭ major		Voice, Violin, Cello, Keyboard	
XXXIa:138bis	The Death of the Linnet	E♭ major		2 Voices, Keyboard	Duet version
XXXIa:139	Donald and Flora	D major		Voice, Violin, Cello, Keyboard	
XXXIa:139bis	Donald and Flora	E♭ major		Voice, Keyboard	Alternate version
XXXIa:140	I canna come ilke day to woo	A major		Voice, Violin, Cello, Keyboard	also referred to as 'Lass, gin ye lo'e me, tell me now'
XXXIa:140bis	Now bank and brae are cloth'd in green	A major		Voice, Keyboard	
XXXIa:141	Hughie Graham	G minor		Voice, Violin, Cello, Keyboard	
XXXIa:142	On a Bank of Flowers	C minor		Voice, Violin, Cello, Keyboard	
XXXIa:143	Morag	D minor		Voice, Violin, Cello, Keyboard	also referred to as 'The young Highland Rover'
XXXIa:143bis	Morag	C minor		Voice, Keyboard	Alternate version
XXXIa:144	A Country Lassie	D major		Voice, Violin, Cello, Keyboard	
XXXIa:145	Strathallan's Lament	D major		Voice, Violin, Cello, Keyboard	
XXXIa:145bis	Strathallan's Lament	D major		Voice, Keyboard	Alternate version
XXXIa:146	Tho' for sev'n years and mair	F major		Voice, Violin, Cello, Keyboard	
XXXIa:147	Bess and her Spinning Wheel	E minor		Voice, Violin, Cello, Keyboard	
XXXIa:148	Kellyburn Braes	E♭ major		Voice, Violin, Cello, Keyboard	
XXXIa:148bis	Kellyburn Braes	D major		Voice, Keyboard	Alternate version
XXXIa:149	O'er the Hills and far away	F♯ minor		Voice, Violin, Cello, Keyboard	
XXXIa:149bis	O how can my poor hear be glad	G minor		Voice, Keyboard	
XXXIa:150	Strephon and Lydia	E♭ major		Voice, Violin, Cello, Keyboard	
XXXIa:151	On Ettrick banks	D major		Voice, Keyboard	
XXXIa:152	Down the burn Davie	F major		2 Voices, Keyboard	
XXXIa:153	William and Margret	B♭ major		Voice, Keyboard	also referred to as Margret's Ghost
XXXIa:154	Johnny's gray breeks	B♭ major		Voice, Keyboard	
XXXIa:155	Woes my heart that we shou'd sunder	F major		2 Voices, Keyboard	
XXXIa:156	Fee him, father	F major		Voice, Keyboard	
XXXIa:157	A Waking, O!	E♭ major		2 Voices, Keyboard	
XXXIa:158	The looking glass	G major		Voice, Keyboard	
XXXIa:159	Highland Mary	E♭ major		Voice, Keyboard	
XXXIa:160	The lass of Patie's Mill	C major		Voice, Keyboard	
XXXIa:160bis	The lass of Patie's Mill	C major		2 Voices, Keyboard	Duet version
XXXIa:161	Queen Mary's lamentation	E♭ major		Voice, Keyboard	
XXXIa:162	The blathrie o't	D major		Voice, Keyboard	
XXXIa:163	Logan water	G minor		Voice, Keyboard	
XXXIa:164	An thou wert mine ain thing	A major		Voice, Keyboard	
XXXIa:164bis	An thou wert mine ain thing	A major		Voice, Keyboard	Alternate version
XXXIa:165	Rothie murcus Rant	C major		Voice, Keyboard	
XXXIa:166	My dearie if thou die	G major		Voice, Keyboard	
XXXIa:167	Peggy, I must love thee	G major		2 Voices, Keyboard	
XXXIa:168	Auld Robin Gray	D major		Voice, Keyboard	
XXXIa:169	Killicrankie	C major		Voice, Keyboard	
XXXIa:170	The broom of Cowdenknows	E♭ major		Voice, Keyboard	
XXXIa:171	Bannocks o'Barley meal	G major		Voice, Keyboard	
XXXIa:172	Bonny Jean	D major		Voice, Keyboard	
XXXIa:173	Sensibility	E♭ major		Voice, Keyboard	
XXXIa:174	Hey tutti taiti	G major		Voice, Keyboard	
XXXIa:175	The lone vale	B♭ major		Voice, Keyboard	
XXXIa:176	The blue bell(s) of Scotland	D major		Voice, Keyboard	
XXXIa:177	I wish my Love were in a Myre	B♭ major		Voice, Keyboard	
XXXIa:178	Bessy Bell and Mary Gray	C major		Voice, Keyboard	
XXXIa:178bis	Bessy Bell and Mary Gray	C major		Voice, Keyboard	Alternate version
XXXIa:179	Galashiels	E♭ major		Voice, Keyboard	
XXXIa:180	Tak' your auld cloak about ye	G minor		Voice, Keyboard	
XXXIa:180bis	Tak' your auld cloak about ye	G minor		Voice, Keyboard	Alternate version
XXXIa:181	Thro' the wood, Laddie	F major		Voice, Keyboard	
XXXIa:182	Macpherson's Farewell	A major		Voice, Keyboard	
XXXIa:183	Pinkie House	D major		Voice, Keyboard	
XXXIa:184	The auld Gudeman	B♭ major		Voice, Keyboard	
XXXIa:185	Scornfu' Nancy	B♭ major		Voice, Keyboard	
XXXIa:185bis	Nancy's to the greenwood	B♭ major		Voice, Keyboard	
XXXIa:186	Tears that must ever fall	D major		Voice, Keyboard	
XXXIa:187	The Birks of Invermay	G major		Voice, Keyboard	
XXXIa:187bis	The Birks of Invermay	G major		Voice, Keyboard	Alternate version
XXXIa:188	The Ewe-bughts	G major		2 Voices, Keyboard	
XXXIa:189	My apron deary	G major		Voice, Keyboard	
XXXIa:189bis	My apron deary	A major		Voice, Keyboard	Alternate version
XXXIa:190	Lochaber	F major		Voice, Keyboard	Probable attribution to Neukomm
XXXIa:190bis	Lochaber	F major		Voice, Keyboard	Alternate version
XXXIa:191	Roslin Castle	C minor		Voice, Keyboard	
XXXIa:191bis	Roslin Castle	C minor		Voice, Keyboard	Alternate version
XXXIa:192	Auld Rob Morris	E♭ major		2 Voices, Keyboard	
XXXIa:193	Craigiebum Wood	D major		Voice, Keyboard	
XXXIa:194	My Love she's but a lassie yet	C major		Voice, Keyboard	
XXXIa:195	The auld wife ayont the fire	E♭ major		Voice, Keyboard	
XXXIa:196	Gil Morris	E♭ major		Voice, Keyboard	also referred to as Morrice
XXXIa:197	Rise up and bar the door	F major		Voice, Keyboard	also referred to as Get up and bar the door; attributed to Neukomm
XXXIa:198	The Sutor's Daughter	G major		2 Voices, Keyboard	
XXXIa:199	The last time I came o'er the muir	D major		Voice, Keyboard	
XXXIa:199bis	The last time I came o'er the muir	D major		Voice, Keyboard	Alternate version
XXXIa:200	The braes of Ballenden	G major		Voice, Keyboard	
XXXIa:200bis	The braes of Ballenden	G major		Voice, Keyboard	Alternate version
XXXIa:201	The Tears of Caledonia	D minor		Voice, Keyboard	
XXXIa:202	Robin Adair	C major		2 Voices, Keyboard	
XXXIa:203	Erin-go-bragh	C major		Voice, Keyboard	Irish aria attributed to Neukomm
XXXIa:203bis	Savourna deligh	C major		Voice, Keyboard	
XXXIa:204	The bush aboon Traquair	B♭ major		2 Voices, Keyboard	
XXXIa:205	I'll never leave thee	D major		Voice, Keyboard	
XXXIa:206	Tweedside	G major		2 Voices, Keyboard	
XXXIa:207	The braes of Yarrow	A major		Voice, Keyboard	
XXXIa:208	The silken snood	E♭ major		Voice, Keyboard	
XXXIa:209	The lass of Lochroyan	A minor		Voice, Keyboard	
XXXIa:210	Low down in the broom	C major		Voice, Keyboard	
XXXIa:211	The yellow hair'd laddie	D major		2 Voices, Keyboard	
XXXIa:212	The flowers of the forest	B♭ major		Voice, Keyboard	
XXXIa:213	The Collier's bonny Lassie	F major		Voice, Keyboard	
XXXIa:214	Waly, Waly	D major		Voice, Keyboard	
XXXIa:214bis	Waly, Waly	D major		Voice, Keyboard	Alternate version
XXXIa:214ter	Waly, Waly	D major		2 Voices, Keyboard	Duet version; uncertain
XXXIa:215	Lewie Gordon	G major		Voice, Keyboard	
XXXIa:216	Corn riggs	A major		2 Voices, Keyboard	
XXXIa:217	Donald	B♭ major		Voice, Keyboard	
XXXIa:218	Auld lang syne	F major		Voice, Keyboard	
XXXIa:219	She rose and loot me in	D minor		Voice, Keyboard	
XXXIa:219bis	She rose and loot me in	D minor		Voice, Keyboard	Alternate version
XXXIa:220	Katherine Ogie	G minor		Voice, Keyboard	
XXXIa:221	The Maid that tends the goats	C major		Voice, Keyboard	
XXXIa:221bis	Hark the mavis' ev'ning sang	C major		Voice, Keyboard	
XXXIa:222	For the lack of Gold	B♭ major		Voice, Keyboard	
XXXIa:223	Sae merry as we ha'e been	C major		Voice, Keyboard	
XXXIa:224	Captain O'Kain	E minor		Voice, Keyboard	
XXXIa:224bis	Captain O'Kain	E minor		Voice, Keyboard	Alternate version; probably Irish aria attributed to Neukomm
XXXIa:225	Gilderoy	G minor		2 Voices, Keyboard	
XXXIa:226	The braes of Ballochmyle	E♭ major		Voice, Keyboard	
XXXIa:227	Rattling roaring Willy	F major		Voice, Keyboard	
XXXIa:228	Oran Gaoil	D minor		2 Voices, Keyboard	
XXXIa:229	Deil tak the wars	B♭ major		Voice, Keyboard	
XXXIa:230	The Poet's ain Jean	G major		Voice, Keyboard	
XXXIa:230bis	The Poet's ain Jean	A major		2 Voicea, Keyboard	Duet version
XXXIa:231	A Jacobite Air	B♭ major		Voice, Keyboard	
XXXIa:232	The border widow's lament	A major		Voice, Keyboard	
XXXIa:233	Up and war them a'Willie	F major		Voice, Keyboard	
XXXIa:234	The east Neuk o'Fife	F major		Voice, Keyboard	
XXXIa:235	Langolee	G major		Voice, Keyboard	
XXXIa:236	Fair Helen of Kirkconnell	B♭ major		Voice, Keyboard	
XXXIa:237	Hooly and fairly	D major		Voice, Keyboard	
XXXIa:238	Johny Macgill	E♭ major		Voice, Keyboard	Probably Irish air attributed to Neukomm
XXXIa:239	Shelah O'Neal	F major		Voice, Keyboard	Attributed to Neukomm
XXXIa:240	Jenny dang the weaver	B♭ major		Voice, Keyboard	Attributed to Neukomm
XXXIa:241	Pat & Kate	B♭ major		2 Voices, Keyboard	
XXXIa:242	Muirland Willy	D minor		Voice, Keyboard	
XXXIa:243	The happy Topers	C major		Voice, Keyboard	
XXXIa:244	What ails this heart of mine	B♭ major		2 Voices, Keyboard	
XXXIa:245	The wish	G minor		Voice, Keyboard	
XXXIa:246	The Boatman	C major		Voice, Keyboard	
XXXIa:247	Happy Dick Dawson	D major		Voice, Keyboard	
XXXIa:248	The old highland laddie	D major		Voice, Keyboard	
XXXIa:249	Oonagh	D minor		Voice, Keyboard	
XXXIa:250	Sir Patrick Spence	A major		Voice, Keyboard	
XXXIa:251	Johny Faw	B♭ major		Voice, Keyboard	Probably to be attributed to Neukomm
XXXIa:252	Jenny's Bawbee	G major		Voice, Keyboard	
XXXIa:253A	Cro Challin	F major		Voice, Keyboard	
XXXIa:253B	The rock and a wee pickle Tow	F major		Voice, Keyboard	Attributed to Neukomm
XXXIa:254	Good night and joy be wi'ye	G major		Voice, Keyboard	Attributed to Neukomm
XXXIa:255	Open the door	E♭ major		Voice, Keyboard	
XXXIa:256	The Humours o'Glen	A minor		Voice, Keyboard	
XXXIa:257	Here awa', there awa'	F major		Voice, Keyboard	
XXXIa:257bis	Wandering Willie	F major		Voice, Keyboard	Perhaps to be attributed to Neukomm
XXXIa:258	My Jo Janet	C major		Voice, Keyboard	
XXXIa:259	The Day returns	E♭ major		2 Voices, Keyboard	
XXXIa:260	The siller crown	F major		Voice, Keyboard	
XXXIa:261	Sweet Annie	G minor		Voice, Keyboard	
XXXIa:262	My lodging is on the cold ground	F major		Voice, Keyboard	Same tune as "Believe me, if all those endearing young charms"
XXXIa:263	Jingling Jonnie	E♭ major		Voice, Keyboard	
XXXIa:264	The three Captains	E♭ major		Voice, Keyboard	
XXXIa:265	Polwarth on the Green	B♭ major		2 Voices, Keyboard	
XXXIa:266	The sailor's lady	A major		Voice, Keyboard	
XXXIa:267	Over the water to Charlie	D major		Voice, Keyboard	
XXXIa:268	My love's a wanton wee thing	D major		Voice, Keyboard	Attributed to Neukomm
XXXIa:269	Kelvin Grove	G major		Voice, Keyboard	uncertain
XXXIa:270	Tullochgorum	D major		Voice, Keyboard	Attributed to Neukomm
XXXIa:271	O were my Love yon Lilac fair	C major		Voice, Keyboard	uncertain
XXXIa:272	Lassie wi' the gowden hair	D minor		Voice, Keyboard	
XXXIa:273	O gin my love were yon red rose	A minor		Voice, Keyboard	
XXXIb:1	Codiad yr Hedydd	B♭ major		Voice, Keyboard	(The rising of the Lark)
XXXIb:2	Gorhoffedd gwyr Harlech	G major		Voice, Keyboard	(The March of the Men of Harlech)
XXXIb:3	Torriad y Dydd	B minor		Voice, Keyboard	(The dawn of Day)
XXXIb:4	Daffydd y Garreg-Wen	G minor		Voice, Keyboard	(David on the White Rock)
XXXIb:5	Mantell Siani	G major		Voice, Keyboard	(Jenny's mantle)
XXXIb:6	Mentra Gwen	A major		2 Voices, Keyboard	(Venture Gwen)
XXXIb:7	Llwyn Onn	G major		Voice, Keyboard	(The Ash Grove)
XXXIb:8	Rhyfelgyrch Cadpen Morgan	B♭ major		Voice, Keyboard	(Captain Morgan's March)
XXXIb:9	Ar hyd y Nos	A major		2 Voices, Keyboard	(The live long night)
XXXIb:10	Twll yn ei Boch	C major		Voice, Keyboard	(The dimpled cheek)
XXXIb:11	Hob y deri dando	G major		Voice, Keyboard	(Away, my herd, under the green oak)
XXXIb:12	Codiad yr Haul	B♭ major		2 Voices, Keyboard	(The rising sun)
XXXIb:13	Ffarwel Ffranses	E♭ major		Voice, Keyboard	(Farewell Frances)
XXXIb:14	Dowck i'r Frwydr	B♭ major		2 Voices, Keyboard	(Come to battle)
XXXIb:15	Grisiel Ground	B♭ major		2 Voices, Keyboard	(The crystal Ground)
XXXIb:16	Hob y deri danno	G major		Voice, Keyboard	(Away to the oaken grove)
XXXIb:17	Tros y Garreg	G minor		Voice, Keyboard	(Over the Stone)
XXXIb:18	Ton y Ceiliog Du	B♭ major		2 Voices, Keyboard	(The Note of the black Cock)
XXXIb:19	Wyres Ned Puw	G minor		Voice, Keyboard	(Ned Pugh's Grand Daughter)
XXXIb:20	Eryri Wen	B minor		Voice, Keyboard	(The white Mountains of Snowdon)
XXXIb:21	The Cornish May song	E♭ major		Voice, Keyboard	
XXXIb:22	Pant corlant yr wyn/Dafydd or Garreg-Ias	B♭ major		2 Voices, Keyboard	(The lambs'fold vale/David of the blue stone)
XXXIb:23	Blodau LIundain	C major		2 Voices, Keyboard	(The flowers of London)
XXXIb:24	Y Gadly's	E♭ major		Voice, Keyboard	(The Camp-Palace or Leaders Tent)
XXXIb:25	Y Bardd yn ei Awen	C major		Voice, Keyboard	(The inspired Bard)
XXXIb:26	Castell Towyn	E♭ major		Voice, Keyboard	(Towyn castle)
XXXIb:27	Erddigan Caer y Waun	G major		Voice, Keyboard	(The Minstrelsy of Chirk Castle)
XXXIb:28	Hoffedd Hywel ab Owen Gwynedd	C minor		Voice, Keyboard	(The delight of Prince Hoel, son of Owen Gwyned)
XXXIb:29	Nos galan	G major		Voice, Keyboard	(New Year's night)
XXXIb:30	Blodaur's Grug	C major		Voice, Keyboard	(The flowers of the heath)
XXXIb:31	Mwynen Cynwyd	E♭ major		Voice, Keyboard	(The melody of Cynwyd)
XXXIb:32	Y Cymry Dedwydd			Voice, Keyboard	(The happy Cambrians)
XXXIb:33	Hela'r Ysgyfamog	C major		Voice, Keyboard	(Hunting the Hare)
XXXIb:34	Digan y Pibydd Cock	C minor		Voice, Keyboard	(The red piper's melody)
XXXIb:35	Blodau'r Drain	G minor		Voice, Keyboard	(The Blossom of the Thorns)
XXXIb:36	Maltreath	G major		Voice, Keyboard	
XXXIb:37	Yr hen Erddigan	C minor		Voice, Keyboard	(The ancient harmony)
XXXIb:38	Reged	G major		Voice, Keyboard	
XXXIb:39	Cerdd yr hen-wr or Coed	F major		Voice, Keyboard	(The Song of the old man of the Wood)
XXXIb:40	Ffarwell Jenengetid	E♭ major		Voice, Keyboard	(Adieu to my juvenile days)
XXXIb:41	Troiad y Droell	B♭ major		Voice, Keyboard	(The Whirling of the spinning wheel)
XXXIb:42	Happiness lost	D major		Voice, Keyboard	
XXXIb:43a	The lamentation of Britain	G minor		2 Voices, Keyboard	
XXXIb:43b	The lamentation of Cambria	G minor		2 Voices, Keyboard	
XXXIb:44	The sweet melody of North Wales	B♭ major		Voice, Keyboard	
XXXIb:45	Lady Owen's delight	F major		Voice, Keyboard	
XXXIb:46	Winifreda	E♭ major		2 Voices, Keyboard	
XXXIb:47	The Willow hymn	D minor		Voice, Keyboard	
XXXIb:48	The allurement of love	D major		2 Voices, Keyboard	
XXXIb:49	The marsh of Rhuddlan	G minor		Voice, Keyboard	
XXXIb:50	The door clapper	G major		2 Voices, Keyboard	
XXXIb:51	The Britons	C minor		Voice, Keyboard	
XXXIb:52	The pursuit of Love	D major		Voice, Keyboard	
XXXIb:53	The poor pedlar	B♭ major		Voice, Keyboard	
XXXIb:54	The Blossom of the honey suckle	A minor		Voice, Keyboard	
XXXIb:55	Aria di guerra e Vittoria	D major		Voice, Keyboard	
XXXIb:56	The Bend of the Horse-shoe	B♭ major		Voice, Keyboard	
XXXIb:57	La Partenza dal Paese e dalli Amici	A minor		Voice, Keyboard	
XXXIb:58	The flower of North Wales	C major		Voice, Keyboard	
XXXIb:59	The departure of the King	E minor		Voice, Keyboard	
XXXIb:60	The New Year's Gift	A minor		Voice, Keyboard	
XXXIb:61	The Parson boasts of mild ale	G minor	1803	Voice, Keyboard	Irish song attributed to Neukomm
XXXIc:1	Graduale: Vias tuas Domine demonstra mihi et semitas tuas edoce me	C major		3 Voices (SSA)	Gradual composed in 1576, deciphered by Joseph Haydn
XXXIc:2	L'idol mio fu questi un giorno	C major		Oboe, Strings	arrangement from the opera II finto pazzo by Carl Ditters von Dittersdorf
XXXIc:3	Vi miro fiso	A major		2 Oboes, 2 Horns	arrangement from the opera Arcifanfano Re de'Matti by Carl Ditters von Dittersdorf
XXXIc:4	Se provasse un pocolino	B♭ major		2 Oboes, 2 Horns	arrangement from the opera La forza delle donne by Pasquale Anfossi
XXXIc:5	Ah crudel poi chè lo brami	F major		Voice, Keyboard	arrangement from the opera La vendemmia by Giuseppe Gazzaniga
XXXIc:6	Gelosi d'amore è figlia	F major		Voice, Keyboard	arrangement from the opera La scuola de' gelosi by Antonio Salieri
XXXIc:7	Si promette facilmente	B minor		Voice, Keyboard	arrangement from the opera La finta giardiniera by Pasquale Anfossi
XXXIc:8	Vorrei punirti indegno	B♭ major		Voice, Keyboard	arrangement from the opera La finta giardiniera by Pasquale Anfossi
XXXIc:9	Non ama la vita chi fugge il diletto			Voice, Keyboard	arrangement from the opera Isabella e Rodrigo by Pasquale Anfossi
XXXIc:10	Che tortura io sono lontano	F major		Voice, Keyboard	arrangement from the opera Gli stravaganti by Niccolò Piccinni
XXXIc:11	Una semplice angelletta	G major		Voice, Keyboard	arrangement from the opera Gli stravaganti by Niccolò Piccinni
XXXIc:12	Deh' frenati i mesti accento	A major		Voice, Keyboard	arrangement from the opera Il curioso indiscreto by Pasquale Anfossi
XXXIc:13	Se voi foste un cavaliere	G major		Voice, Keyboard	arrangement from the opera I due supposti conti by Domenico Cimarosa
XXXIc:14	Silenzio miei Signori			Voice, Keyboard	arrangement from the opera L'impresario in angustie by Domenico Cimarosa
XXXIc:15	Se palpitar degg'io con cento larve	B♭ major		Voice, Keyboard	arrangement from the opera La vendetta di Nino by Alessio Prati
XXXIc:16	12 Catches and Glees			3 Voices, Keyboard	accompaniment by Haydn
XXXIc:17a	The Ladies Looking-Glass	D major		Voice, Keyboard	
XXXIc:17b	The Ladies Looking-Glass	D major		Voice, Keyboard	

== Pasticcios ==
Hob. No.	Title	Key	Date	Instrumentation	Notes
XXXII:1	La Circe, ossia l'isola incantata		1789	2 Sopranos, 3 Tenors, Bass, Orchestra	Arranged from "Ipocondriaco" by Johann Gottlieb Naumann and an unknown opera, edited by Haydn.
XXXII:2	Der Freybrief		1788		Arranged by Fridolin von Weber using works by Haydn and other composers. Music lost
XXXII:3	Alessandro il Grande		1790		
XXXII:4	Der Äpfeldieb		1781		Music lost
