= Piano Sonata in B-flat major =

Piano Sonata in B-flat major may refer to:

- Piano Sonata No. 11 (Beethoven)
- Piano Sonata No. 29 (Beethoven)
- Piano Sonata Hob. XVI/17 (Haydn)
- Piano Sonata Hob. XVI/18 (Haydn)
- Piano Sonata No. 3 (Mozart)
- Piano Sonata No. 13 (Mozart)
- Piano Sonata No. 17 (Mozart)
- Piano Sonata K. 498a (Mozart)
- Piano Sonata No. 7 (Prokofiev)
- Piano Sonata No. 8 (Prokofiev)
- Piano Sonata D. 960 (Schubert)
- Sonata for piano four-hands, D 617 (Schubert)
