= Keyboard Sonata No. 20 =

Keyboard Sonata No. 20 may refer to:

- Piano Sonata Hob. XVI/18, L. 20, in B-flat major, by Haydn
- Piano Sonata Hob. XVI/20, L. 33, in C minor, by Haydn
