= L'Impériale =

L'Impériale can refer to:

- Imperial Oil, Canadian oil company
- Symphony No. 53 (Haydn), nicknamed "L'Impériale"
