= Symphony No. 57 (Haydn) =

Symphony in four movements by Joseph Haydn

Joseph Haydn

The Symphony No. 57 in D major, Hoboken I/57, is a symphony by Joseph Haydn. The symphony was composed in 1774, under the auspices of Nikolaus Esterhazy, for whom he would compose symphonies until 1789. It is scored for two oboes, two bassoons, two horns, and strings.

== Movements ==
It has four movements:

1. Adagio – (Allegro)
2. Adagio
3. Menuet & trio: Allegretto
4. Finale: Prestissimo

Daniel Heartz has noted Haydn's use of a "repeated D motif", from the very beginning of the symphony throughout the work. The second movement is structured as a theme with four variations. The finale is based on a traditional melody which was also used by Baroque composer Alessandro Poglietti in his composition "Canzona and Capriccio on the Racket of Hen and Rooster". Here, the melody is adapted to a tarantella/saltarello dance rhythm similar to the previous Symphony No. 56.
