= Symphony No. 62 (Haydn) =

Symphony in four movements by Joseph Haydn

Joseph Haydn

The Symphony No. 62 in D major, Hoboken I/62, is a symphony written by Joseph Haydn for the orchestra at Esterháza in 1780 or 1781, a good length of time after the writing of Symphony No. 61.

== Movements ==
The symphony is scored for flute, two oboes, bassoon, two French horns, and strings.

There are four movements:

1. Allegro
2. Allegretto
3. Menuetto and Trio: Allegretto, 3/4
4. Finale: Allegro

The first movement contains material which Haydn reworked from an earlier Sinfonia (Overtura) in D, Hob. Ia/7. This movement appears to be remarkably aligned with the harmonies of the Finale of his 53rd symphony, except that the latter symphony has a Finale present in many versions. They were both written at a time when Haydn was integrating his symphonic works with the operas he was writing for the theater at Esterhaza, with the result that many of the symphonies written from 1774 to 1781, have the mood of stage works he wrote during the period.

The slow movement has a barcarole-like accompaniment, but instead of the typical Venetian gondolier melody over the top, Haydn presents only melodic fragments, teasing the listener into thinking a melody is near always interrupting before one takes shape.

The trio of the minuet features violins and bassoons and frequently loses the downbeat, a trick Haydn would later play to greater effect in the corresponding trio of his Oxford Symphony.

The finale opens piano with ambiguous tonality for the first six measures before the full tutti firmly establishes D major forte in the seventh bar. The finale proceeds in Italian style. The second theme group contains Lombard rhythms which are worked extensively in the development. The ambiguous tonality returns for the six measures of the recapitulation, this time accentuated by counterpoint, before D major returns and symphony drives towards its conclusion.

L.P. Burstein has noted Haydn's use of the ♯VII chord and the ♯VII → V progression in the fourth movement.
