= String Quartets, Op. 64 (Haydn) =

Six string quartets by Joseph Haydn

Joseph Haydn's String Quartets, Op. 64, is a set of six string quartets composed in 1790. Along with six earlier quartets published under the opus numbers 54 and 55, they are known as the Tost quartets, after the Hungarian violinist and later merchant Johann Tost who helped Haydn find a publisher for the works. Unlike the earlier quartets, Haydn actually dedicated the Op. 64 set to Tost in gratitude for his efforts. (Note: This dedication, which may have been made without authorization by Tost, was later removed from some printings of the quartets, apparently at the request of Haydn.)

== List of Opus 64 quartets ==
- Quartet No. 48 in C major, Op. 64, No. 1, FHE No. 31, Hoboken No. III:65
  1. Allegro moderato
  2. Menuetto: Allegretto ma non troppo
  3. Allegretto scherzando quasi andante
  4. Finale: Presto
- Quartet No. 49 in B minor, Op. 64, No. 2, FHE No. 32, Hoboken No. III:68
  1. Allegro spiritoso
  2. Adagio ma non troppo
  3. Menuetto: Allegretto
  4. Finale: Presto
- Quartet No. 50 in B♭ major, Op. 64, No. 3, FHE No. 33, Hoboken No. III:67
  1. Vivace assai
  2. Adagio
  3. Menuetto: Allegretto
  4. Finale: Allegro con spirito
- Quartet No. 51 in G major, Op. 64, No. 4, FHE No. 34, Hoboken No. III:66
  1. Allegro con brio
  2. Menuetto: Allegretto
  3. Adagio: Cantabile e sostenuto
  4. Finale: Presto
- Quartet No. 52 in E♭ major, Op. 64, No. 6, FHE No. 36, Hoboken No. III:64
  1. Allegretto
  2. Andante
  3. Menuetto: Allegretto
  4. Finale: Presto
- Quartet No. 53 in D major ("The Lark"), Op. 64, No. 5, FHE No. 35, Hoboken No. III:63

I. Allegro moderato

II. Adagio cantabile

III. Menuetto allegretto

IV. Finale vivace
Performed by the Musopen String Quartet

1. Allegro moderato
2. Adagio cantabile
3. Menuetto: Allegretto
4. Finale: Vivace
