= Roman Hoffstetter =

German monk and composer (b1742)

Roman Hoffstetter (born 24 April 1742, in Laudenbach, near Bad Mergentheim, Holy Roman Empire; died: 21 May (Baker's) or June (New Grove 2nd) 1815, in Miltenberg-am-Main, Germany; alternative spelling Romanus Hoffstetter) was a classical composer and Benedictine monk who also admired Joseph Haydn almost to the point of imitation. Hoffstetter wrote "everything that flows from Haydn's pen seems to me so beautiful and remains so imprinted on my memory that I cannot prevent myself now and again from imitating something as well as I can."

In 1965, the musicologist Alan Tyson (with H.C. Robbins Landon) published the finding that the entire set of six String Quartets long-admired as Haydn's Op. 3, including the Andante cantabile of No. 5 in F Major known as Haydn's Serenade, were actually by Roman Hoffstetter. Further discoveries have purported to establish Hoffstetter's authorship of the first two of the six quartets, but not the other four.

Haydn (Hoffstetter) String Quartet No. 5 in F Major Op. 3, 2nd Movement - aka "Serenade": Andante Cantabile. Written by Roman Hoffstetter but commonly attributed to Joseph Haydn

Little is known about his early training or life, though it is likely that he came from a musical family. He was a twin; the other was Johann Urban Alois Hoffstetter, who became director of the Franconian province of the Teutonic Order and also a small-time composer. Hoffstetter took his vows as Pater Romanus at Amorbach Abbey on 5 June 1763, and was ordained a priest on 10 September 1766. He succeeded in due time to the position of Regens chori (choir director), also functioning as an organist and on-call parish priest for smaller churches in the Odenwald region, although his principal position at the abbey was as culinary overseer (Küchenmeister). The majority of works written for Amorbach were lost in the dissolution of the monastery library by French forces in 1803. Following the secularization of Amorbach in 1803, Hoffstetter retired – almost completely deaf and blind – to Miltenberg-am-Main with his abbot, Benedikt Kuelsheimer. He died there 12 years later.

Hoffstetter's music has the virtue of being memorable, with clear-cut themes that stay in the memory and make it easy to follow the musical development. Besides his string quartets (which have had to be carefully researched for stylistic earmarks that distinguish them clearly from Haydn), Hoffstetter composed at least ten Masses (several of which are preserved at the Archdiocesian Archives in Würzburg), as well as a number of smaller church works, including a lost Miserere on which he collaborated with Swedish-German composer Joseph Martin Kraus (1756–1792). The three viola concertos, one of which is actually a double concerto for viola and violoncello, were once offered for sale by the German firm of Breitkopf, but recent research has determined that these were actually composed by Kraus, not Hoffstetter, as the autograph of one of them in the Deutsche Staatsbibliothek clearly shows.

Hoffstetter is best known for his friendship with Kraus, who was born in nearby Miltenberg-am-Main. Their friendship began as early as 1774 and continued through Kraus's appointment as court composer to Swedish King Gustav III, and on through to Kraus's death. Hoffstetter corresponded with both Kraus, and his early biographer, Swedish diplomat Fredrik Samuel Silverstolpe, who put him in touch with his idol, Haydn. Nine of these letters, written in 1800 to 1802, have been preserved in Silverstolpe's collection at Uppsala University Library. [Unverricht, H. "Die Beide Hoffstetter," 1968]

== Literature ==
- Marshall J. Fine: The viola concertos of Fr. Roman Hofstetter, OSB. A new edition based on the manuscripts found at the University of Lund. UMI Publications, Ann Arbor, Mich., 1990
- Hubert Unverricht: Beiträge zur Mittelrheinischen Musikgeschichte. Bd 10. Die beiden Hoffstetter. Zwei Komponistenporträts mit Werkverzeichnissen. Schott, Mainz 1968, ISBN 3-7957-1310-2
- L. Somfai: Zur Echtheitsfrage des Haydnschen op. 3. Haydn-Jahrbuch III, 1965.

== See also ==
- List of Austrians in music
