= String Quartets, Op. 3 (attributed to Haydn) =

String quartets attributed to Joseph Haydn

The String Quartets, Op. 3 are a set of six string quartets published under Joseph Haydn's name by the French music publisher Bailleux in 1777 and subsequently reprinted in 1801 by Maison Pleyel as part of a series of the complete Haydn string quartets.

Long held to be by Haydn, the works had troubled musicologists as they seemed out of place in the developmental sequence of string quartets composed by Haydn. The lack, however, of surviving manuscripts made confirming that these works were by Haydn or another composer difficult, compounded by the fact that Haydn had included them in his 1805 catalog of works.

In 1964, musicologists Alan Tyson and H. C. Robbins Landon, proposed from their research that Bailleux had substituted Haydn's name for that of Romanus Hoffstetter, a minor composer later known for his admiration of Haydn, a move clearly intended by the publisher to increase sales.

The Opus 3 quartets are now commonly attributed to Hoffstetter, though there is no universal agreement on this. According to the scholar Allan Badley, "The works were omitted from the Entwurf-Katalog, the running catalogue of his works he (Haydn) kept from 1765 until after the London visits, but found their way into the Haydn-Verzeichnis prepared in 1805 under the composer's direct supervision by his faithful servant Joseph Elssler. Haydn also accepted the six works as genuine in the edition of his complete string quartets published by Ignaz Pleyel. This evidence is not beyond questioning." Badley goes on to say "The meagre bibliographical evidence has been painstakingly sifted and the works themselves subjected to every kind of analytical technique known to musicology. Haydn's authorship still remains doubtful but so too does that of Pater Romanus Hoffstetter the most commonly favoured alternative."

In the 1980s, Scott Fruehwald claimed to "show conclusively" that the quartets were not by Haydn, based on stylistic analysis. The study also asserted that only the first two quartets were by Hoffstetter.

== List of Opus 3 quartets ==
- Quartet in E major, Op. 3, No. 1, Hoboken No. III:13
- Quartet in C major, Op. 3, No. 2, Hoboken No. III:14
- Quartet in G major, Op. 3, No. 3, Hoboken No. III:15
- Quartet in B♭ major, Op. 3, No. 4, Hoboken No. III:16
- Quartet in F major ("Serenade"), Op. 3, No. 5, Hoboken No. III:17
- Quartet in A major, Op. 3, No. 6, Hoboken No. III:18

== See also ==
- Violin Sonata in D major (attributed to Mozart) - Another case of a music publisher using a well known composer's name to boost sales.
