= Symphony No. 66 (Haydn) =

Symphony in four movements by Joseph Haydn

Joseph Haydn

The Symphony No. 66 in B♭ major (Hoboken I/66) is a symphony by Joseph Haydn. The time of composition is uncertain, with one speculation from around 1775–76.

The symphony is scored for two oboes, two bassoons, two horns and strings.

== Movements ==
The work is in four movements:

1. Allegro con brio
2. Adagio
3. Menuetto & Trio
4. Finale: Scherzando e presto

L.P. Burstein has noted Haydn's use of the VII♯ chord and the VII♯ → V progression in the first movement. A.P. Brown has noted how Haydn reworked material from the symphony's first movement into other compositions, including an overture in D and two other symphonies.
