= Symphony No. 56 (Haydn) =

Symphony in four movements by Joseph Haydn

Joseph Haydn

The Symphony No. 56 in C major, Hoboken I/56, is a symphony by Joseph Haydn, composed by 1774. It is scored for two oboes, bassoon, two horns (C alto and F), two trumpets, timpani and strings. This is the only symphony by Joseph Haydn where he calls for the usage of both C alto horns and trumpets.

It is in four movements:

1. Allegro di molto, 3/4
2. Adagio, 2/4
3. Menuet & trio, 3/4
4. Finale: Prestissimo, 4/4

Daniel Heartz has noted the similarity of the first movement in its character to the first movement of Haydn's Symphony No. 55. The slow movement, in F, contains notable concertante work in the bassoon and two oboe parts. The finale is a frenetic tarantella/saltarello dance movement with several pauses and fermatas as interruptions.

== Sources ==
- Robbins Landon, H. C. (1963) Joseph Haydn: Critical Edition of the Complete Symphonies, Universal Edition, Vienna.
