= Symphony No. 55 (Haydn) =

1774 composition by Joseph Haydn

- The Schoolmaster
- by Joseph Haydn
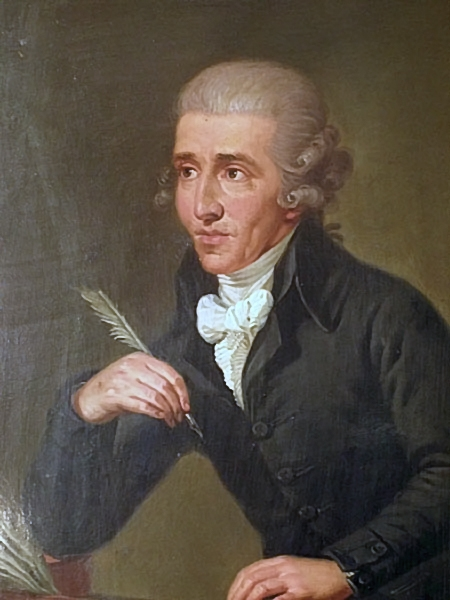
- Portrait of Joseph Haydn, ca. 1770
- Key: E♭ major
- Catalogue: Hob. I:55
- Composed: 1774
- Duration: About 25 minutes
- Movements: Four
- Scoring: Orchestra

The Symphony No. 55 in E♭ major, Hob. I:55, is a symphony by Joseph Haydn, composed by 1774. It is scored for two oboes, bassoon, two horns, and strings.

It is in four movements:

1. Allegro di molto, 3/4
2. Adagio ma semplicemente, 2/4 in B♭ major
3. Menuetto and trio, 3/4
4. Finale: Presto, 2/4

The second movement is a theme with seven variations. Keeping with the semplicemente marking, the theme is quite simple and is in two halves.

A recurring contrast amongst the variations is between those that are staccato (theme, 2 & 3) and those that are more legato (1, 4, 5). The variations overlap twice (theme with variation 1, variation 3 with variation 4) in that the first half for the two variations in sequence followed by the second half for each. Both times this is done to contrast a staccato variation with a legato one. For the most part, the movement is for muted strings only, with notable wind outbursts in the second variation as well as the use of full tutti in the seventh variation which serves to recapitulate the movement.

The trio of the Menuetto is scored for solo cello and two solo violins.

The finale is a mixture of variation and rondo form.

== Nickname (The Schoolmaster) ==
H. C. Robbins Landon notes that while Haydn's autograph manuscript of the symphony contains no reference to this title, the work has been known by this name since the early nineteenth century. Landon suggests that the dotted rhythm of the second movement calls to mind the wagging finger of a schoolmaster, and points out that in the catalog of his works that Haydn helped prepare in the final years of his life, there is a fragment of a lost Divertimento in D containing a similar dotted rhythm entitled Der verliebte Schulmeister (the schoolmaster in love). Landon goes on to propose a program for the symphony's second movement in which the sections marked semplice represent the "strict, pedantic" teacher and the dolce sections depict the same teacher overwhelmed by love.

== See also ==
- List of symphonies with names
