= Piano Sonata Hob. XVI/17 =

The Piano Sonata in B♭ major, Hob. XVI/17, is a composition that was originally attributed to Joseph Haydn, but was later considered to have been written by an unknown composer, subsequently identified as Johann Gottfried Schwanenberger.

== History ==
The composition was discovered in Raigern Abbey, located in Brno, Czech Republic, by G. Feder. The work appears to be the product of Johann Gottfried Schwanenberger and not Joseph Haydn. The manuscript containing the composition is now housed in the Leoš Janáček Museum in Brno, Czech Republic.

== Structure ==
The sonata is in three movements:

1. Allegro
2. Andante
3. Allegro
