= Piano Sonata Hob. XVI/18 =

Sonata by Joseph Haydn

The Piano Sonata in B♭ major, Hob. XVI/18, L. 20, was written in 1767 by Joseph Haydn.

== History ==
Haydn's keyboard composition style changed in 1766. He had just been appointed full Kapellmeister in the service of the Esterházy family, after the death of Gregor Werner, the previous Kapellmeister. He had new responsibilities overseeing church music and the production of opera. While he was still writing keyboard sonatas for the court, he decided to keep a group of sonatas aside for himself, including Hob. XVI/18, along with XVI/20, XVI/45 and XVI/46, perhaps because they were experimental. The style in these sonatas signify Haydn's move away from the galant style, and towards more expressive themes.

== Structure ==
The work has two movements:

1. Allegro moderato
2. Moderato

The piece is scored for harpsichord and has a charged emotionality and imposing manner, a departure from his previous works. The first movement is in 2/4 time and is 117 measures long. The movement features much ornamentation. It is in sonata form, and is described as harmonically inventive. The rhythm in this movement is constantly shifting between 32nd notes and 16th notes, making the performance aspect challenging.

The second movement is in 3/4 time and is 110 measures long. It has a minuet-like character and features double thirds, broken thirds, scales, ornaments, contrapuntal textures, and voicing.
