= List of symphonies by Joseph Haydn =

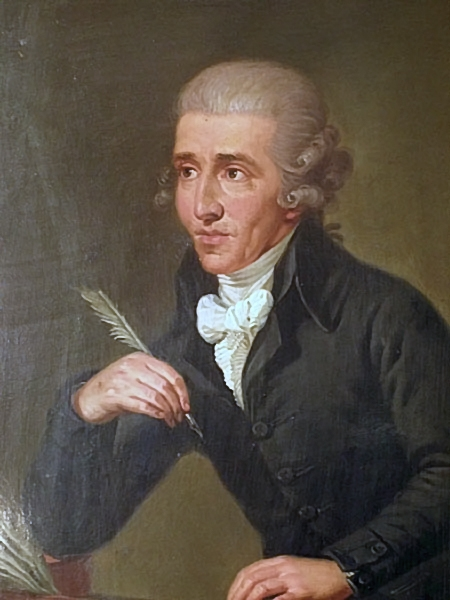
Portrait of Joseph Haydn by Ludwig Guttenbrunn, from c. 1770

There are 106 symphonies by Joseph Haydn (1732–1809). Of these, 104 have numbers associated with them which were originally assigned by Eusebius Mandyczewski in 1908 in the chronological order that was known at the time. In the subsequent decades, numerous inaccuracies in the chronology (especially in the lower numbers) were found, but the Mandyczewski numbers were so widely used that when Anthony van Hoboken compiled his catalogue of Haydn's works, he incorporated the Mandyczewski number into Catalogue I (e.g., Symphony No. 34 is listed as Hob. I/34). Also in that time period, two additional symphonies were discovered (which were assigned non-Mandyczewskian letters "A" and "B"), bringing the total to 106.

== The symphonies ==
- Symphony No. 1 in D major (composed by 1759)
- Symphony No. 2 in C major (between 1757 and 1761)
- Symphony No. 3 in G major (between 1760 and 1762)
- Symphony No. 4 in D major (between 1757 and 1761)
- Symphony No. 5 in A major (between 1760 and 1762)
- Symphony No. 6 in D major, Le matin (1761)
- Symphony No. 7 in C major, Le midi (1761)
- Symphony No. 8 in G major, Le soir (1761)
- Symphony No. 9 in C major (1762)
- Symphony No. 10 in D major (between 1757 and 1761)
- Symphony No. 11 in E♭ major (between 1760 and 1762)
- Symphony No. 12 in E major (1763)
- Symphony No. 13 in D major (1763)
- Symphony No. 14 in A major (between 1761 and 1763)
- Symphony No. 15 in D major (between 1760 and 1763)
- Symphony No. 16 in B♭ major (between 1757 and 1761)
- Symphony No. 17 in F major (between 1757 and 1763)
- Symphony No. 18 in G major (between 1757 and 1764)
- Symphony No. 19 in D major (between 1757 and 1761)
- Symphony No. 20 in C major (by 1762)
- Symphony No. 21 in A major (1764)
- Symphony No. 22 in E♭ major, Philosopher (1764)
- Symphony No. 23 in G major (1764)
- Symphony No. 24 in D major (1764)
- Symphony No. 25 in C major (between 1761 and, most likely, in 1763)
- Symphony No. 26 in D minor, Lamentatione (1768, maybe 1769)
- Symphony No. 27 in G major, Hermannstädter (probably before 1760)
- Symphony No. 28 in A major (1765)
- Symphony No. 29 in E major (1765)
- Symphony No. 30 in C major, Alleluia (1765)
- Symphony No. 31 in D major, Hornsignal (1765)
- Symphony No. 32 in C major (between 1757 and 1763, probably 1760/1761)
- Symphony No. 33 in C major (1760/1761, or 1763–65)
- Symphony No. 34 in D minor (1763)
- Symphony No. 35 in B♭ major (1767)
- Symphony No. 36 in E♭ major (first half of the 1760s)
- Symphony No. 37 in C major (by 1758)
- Symphony No. 38 in C major, Echo (between 1765 and 1769, perhaps 1768)
- Symphony No. 39 in G minor (thought to be 1765)
- Symphony No. 40 in F major (by 1763)
- Symphony No. 41 in C major (by 1769)
- Symphony No. 42 in D major (by 1771)
- Symphony No. 43 in E♭ major, Mercury (by 1771)
- Symphony No. 44 in E minor, Trauer (1772)
- Symphony No. 45 in F♯ minor, Farewell (1772)
- Symphony No. 46 in B major (1772)
- Symphony No. 47 in G major, The Palindrome (1772)
- Symphony No. 48 in C major, Maria Theresia (1768/1769)
- Symphony No. 49 in F minor, La passione (1768)
- Symphony No. 50 in C major (1773 and 1774)
- Symphony No. 51 in B♭ major (1773/1774)
- Symphony No. 52 in C minor (1771/1772)
- Symphony No. 53 in D major, L'impériale (1778)/(1779)
- Symphony No. 54 in G major (1774)
- Symphony No. 55 in E♭ major, The Schoolmaster (by 1774)
- Symphony No. 56 in C major (by 1774)
- Symphony No. 57 in D major (1774)
- Symphony No. 58 in F major (between 1767 and 1774)
- Symphony No. 59 in A major, Feuer (by 1769)
- Symphony No. 60 in C major, Il distratto (by 1775, probably 1774)
- Symphony No. 61 in D major (1776)
- Symphony No. 62 in D major (1780/1781)
- Symphony No. 63 in C major, La Roxelane (between 1779 and 1781)
- Symphony No. 64 in A major, Tempora mutantur (between 1773 and 1775)
- Symphony No. 65 in A major (by 1778)
- Symphony No. 66 in B♭ major (1775–1776?)
- Symphony No. 67 in F major (by 1779)
- Symphony No. 68 in B♭ major (by 1779)
- Symphony No. 69 in C major, Laudon (1775-1776)
- Symphony No. 70 in D major (by 1779)
- Symphony No. 71 in B♭ major (by 1780)
- Symphony No. 72 in D major (between 1763 and 1765)
- Symphony No. 73 in D major, La chasse (1782)
- Symphony No. 74 in E♭ major (1780/1781)
- Symphony No. 75 in D major (between 1779 and 1781)
- Symphony No. 76 in E♭ major (1782)
- Symphony No. 77 in B♭ major (1782)
- Symphony No. 78 in C minor (1782)
- Symphony No. 79 in F major (1784)
- Symphony No. 80 in D minor (1784)
- Symphony No. 81 in G major (1784)
- The "Paris symphonies":
  - Symphony No. 82 in C major, The Bear (1786)
  - Symphony No. 83 in G minor, The Hen (1785)
  - Symphony No. 84 in E♭ major, In nomine Domini (1786)
  - Symphony No. 85 in B♭ major, La Reine ("The Queen") (1785/1786)
  - Symphony No. 86 in D major (1786)
  - Symphony No. 87 in A major (1786)
- Symphony No. 88 in G major (1787)
- Symphony No. 89 in F major (1787)
- Symphony No. 90 in C major (1788)
- Symphony No. 91 in E♭ major (1788)
- Symphony No. 92 in G major, Oxford (1789)
- The "London symphonies":
  - Symphony No. 93 in D major (1791)
  - Symphony No. 94 in G major, The Surprise (1791)
  - Symphony No. 95 in C minor (1791)
  - Symphony No. 96 in D major, The Miracle (1791)
  - Symphony No. 97 in C major (1792)
  - Symphony No. 98 in B♭ major (1792)
  - Symphony No. 99 in E♭ major (1793)
  - Symphony No. 100 in G major, Military (1793/1794)
  - Symphony No. 101 in D major, The Clock (1793/1794)
  - Symphony No. 102 in B♭ major (1794)
  - Symphony No. 103 in E♭ major, Drumroll (1795)
  - Symphony No. 104 in D major, London (1795)

Hoboken also includes four other works in his "Symphony" category (Hob. I):

- Hob. I/105 in B♭ major, better known as the Sinfonia Concertante for violin, cello, oboe and bassoon (1792)
- Hob. I/106 in D major, for which only one part has survived (1769?); sometimes used as the overture to Le pescatrici
- Hob. I/107 in B♭ major, often known not by a number but as Symphony A (between 1757 and 1760); arranged as string quartet op. 1, no. 5 Hob. III/5
- Hob. I/108 in B♭ major, often known not by a number but as Symphony B (between 1757 and 1760)

Despite this, the number of "symphonies" by Haydn is usually given as 106.

== Extensive and complete recordings ==
Several conductors recorded incomplete runs of the symphonies on LP, including two, Hermann Scherchen and Max Goberman, whose efforts have been reissued in all or part on CD. During the 1960s, Leslie Jones conducted some fifty of Haydn's symphonies together with The Little Orchestra of London. Although not using period instruments, Jones may have been one of the first conductors to use small scale forces. From the mid-1970s to early 1990s, Neville Marriner recorded the "name" symphonies (29 symphonies) with the Academy of St Martin in the Fields for Philips Classics. These include Nos. 6-8, 22, 26, 31, 43-45, 47-49, 53, 55, 59, 60, 63, 69, 73, 82, 83, 85, 92, 94, 96, 100, 101, 103, 104. They were originally released separately, then as a box set. Four conductors have recorded the complete symphonies of Joseph Haydn:

- Ernst Märzendorfer recorded a complete set between 1969 and 1972 with the Vienna Chamber Orchestra, but it was little known at the time due to limited US-only distribution.
- The first to make a complete recording that was widely available was the Hungarian-American conductor Antal Doráti, with the Philharmonia Hungarica for Decca between 1970 and 1974, issued first on LP and subsequently on CD.
- Hungarian conductor Ádám Fischer recorded a complete CD cycle between 1987 and 2001 with the Austro-Hungarian Haydn Orchestra.
- Between 1998 and 2009, American conductor Dennis Russell Davies recorded a complete CD cycle with the Stuttgart Chamber Orchestra for Sony Classical.

Christopher Hogwood was to have recorded on period instruments a complete cycle of Haydn symphonies with the Academy of Ancient Music (AAM) for Decca's L'Oiseau Lyre imprint in a total of 15 volumes, each containing 3 CDs. Between 1990 and 2000, a total of 10 of these volumes were commercially released on CD; these volumes contain Nos. 1–75, plus the two early symphonies numbered 107 and 108, and are presented in a theoretical chronological rather than numerical order. The program booklets contained in each of these 10 volumes keep a concordance to the complete contents of the 15 volumes. Prior to the commencement of this project, Hogwood and the AAM had recorded four of Haydn's later symphonies (94, 96, 100, and 104) for L'Oiseau Lyre, which were released first on LP and later on CD. The last five of the 15-volume series were never released, although at least Nos. 76 and 77 were recorded and had a limited release on CD through BBC Music Magazine.

Between 1980 and 1986, the violinist Derek Solomons recorded on period instruments 49 symphonies with L'Estro Armonico for CBS Masterworks. These include Nos. 1-5, 10, 11, 15-20, 26, 27, 32, 33, 35, 37-39, 41-52, 54-60, 63-69, 107, 108.

Between 1989 and 1990, Trevor Pinnock recorded on period instruments the Sturm und Drang symphonies (19 symphonies) with The English Concert for Deutsche Grammophon's Archiv Produktion. These include Nos. 26, 35, 38, 39, 41-52, 58, 59, 65. In 1987, Pinnock had already recorded Nos. 6-8.

Also, in 1990, another attempt at a complete Haydn cycle on period instruments began with the Hanover Band led from the keyboard by Roy Goodman for Hyperion Records. Unfortunately, after releasing 57 symphonies on 17 CDs, this project ran out of funds in 1994.

A hybrid attempt to record the complete cycle on both period and modern instruments has been made by Thomas Fey and Johannes Klumpp. As of October 2014 Fey, before suffering a "severe traumatic brain injury", has passed the halfway point of recording all the symphonies – 57 plus the Sinfonia Concertante in 22 volumes so far – with the Heidelberger Sinfoniker (one volume with the Schlierbacher Kammerorchester) for Hänssler. The project was continued and finished by Klumpp. The first volumes were released in 2000 and the last in 2025.

There is an active attempt to record the complete cycle on period instruments by Giovanni Antonini. In 2014, Antonini commenced a cycle for Alpha Records with Il Giardino Armonico (Vols. 1–4) and Kammerorchester Basel (Vols. 5 & 6, to date), aiming to perform and record all of Haydn's symphonies by 2032 (the 300th anniversary of the composer's birth).

Conductor Michael Fendre has developed a website which contains for all symphonies, whenever available, links to the recordings by Antal Doráti, Ádám Fischer and Christopher Hogwood. The site also contains facts, analyses and a score of each symphony.

== See also ==
- List of compositions by Joseph Haydn
- List of concertos by Joseph Haydn
- List of Masses by Joseph Haydn
- List of operas by Joseph Haydn
- List of piano trios by Joseph Haydn
- List of solo piano compositions by Joseph Haydn
- List of string quartets by Joseph Haydn
