= Karl Joseph of Morzin =

Bohemian aristocrat (1717–1783)

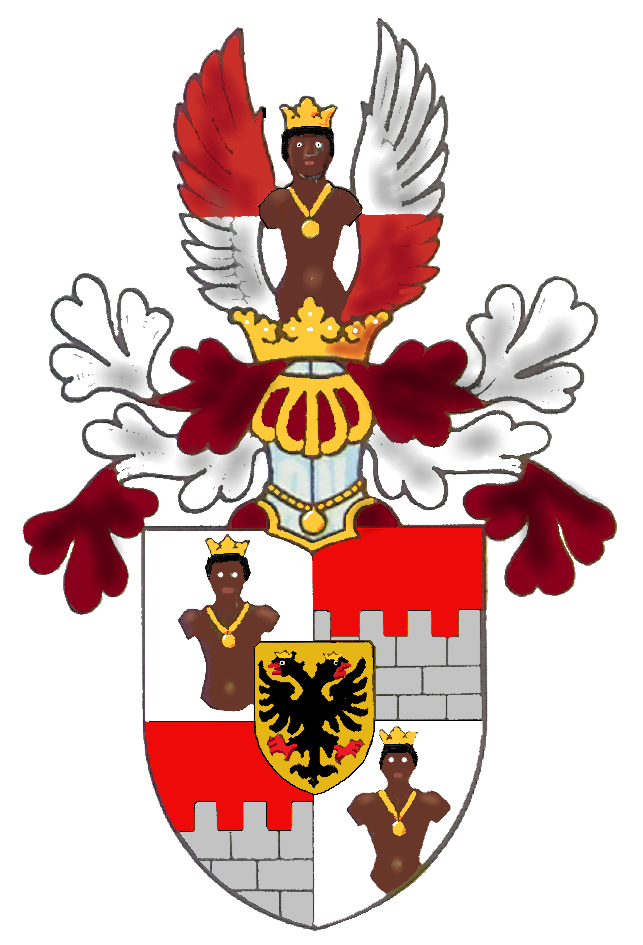
Coat of Arms of Count Karl Joseph of Morzin

Count Karl Joseph of Morzin (1717–1783) was a Bohemian aristocrat from the Morzin family (originally from northeastern Italian region of Friuli), remembered today as the first person to employ the composer Joseph Haydn as his Kapellmeister, or music director. The first few of Haydn's many symphonies were written for the Count.

== Life ==
Authorities provide varying hypotheses for the identity of the Count Morzin who initially hired Haydn, as early biographies identified the man solely by his hereditary title. The New Grove (article by James Webster) asserts that the count was Karl Joseph Franz Morzin (1717–1783), whereas a biography by leading Haydn scholar H. C. Robbins Landon states that it was his father, Ferdinand Maximilan Franz Morzin (1693–1763).

=== Patron of Joseph Haydn ===
The exact date of Haydn's appointment is also uncertain; however, it was in 1757. The appointment ended a period of economic insecurity for the composer, during which time he had worked as a freelancer, gradually building up his reputation and expanding his connections with the aristocracy. Haydn's biographer Georg August Griesinger (1810), who interviewed the composer in his old age, wrote:

In the year 1759 Haydn was appointed in Vienna to be music director to Count Morzin with a salary of two hundred gulden, free room, and board at the staff table. Here he enjoyed at last the good fortune of a care-free existence; it suited him thoroughly. The winter was spent in Vienna and the summer in Bohemia, in the vicinity of Pilsen.

This migratory pattern was characteristic of aristocracy in Haydn's day: summers on hereditary estates in the provinces, winters in the fashionable capital. The location of the Count's estate has been more precisely specified by Robbins Landon as the village Unter-Lukawitz (in German, in Czech: Dolní Lukavice), usually referred to as Lukavec, now in the Czech Republic. Robbins Landon, writing in 1988, adds "the castle, which still stands, is now used as a mental hospital." Jones (2009) says of the castle that it "still survives, though now empty and in a state of decay."

Haydn wrote, approximately, his first fifteen symphonies for Count Morzin. Evidence from copied parts made for Baron Karl Joseph Weber von Fürnberg (an earlier Haydn employer) leads Robbins Landon to conjecture that the Count's orchestra consisted of "at least six, possibly eight violins ... while in the basso section there were at least one cello, one bassoon and one double bass (violone). There was also a wind-band sextet (oboes, bassoons, and horns).". Thus, the orchestra was much smaller than orchestras for which Haydn wrote later on in his career (which ranged in size up to about 60), let alone a modern symphonic ensemble.

While in Vienna, the Morzin ensemble was evidently part of a lively musical scene, sponsored by the aristocracy. Haydn's contemporary biographer Giuseppe Carpani (whose testimony is not always trusted by musicologists) wrote the following concerning Count Harrach, who was the patron of Haydn's own birth village of Rohrau:

Count Harrach ... was the first to bring the music of Sammartini to Vienna, where it quickly won applause and became the vogue in that great capital so enamored of this kind of diversion. Count Pálffy, ... Count Schönborn and Count Morzin vied with one another in procuring novelties for display in their almost daily concerts.

It was while Haydn was working for Count Morzin that he was married (17 November 1760) Anna Maria Keller, despite the fact that his contract forbade him to marry. The marriage, which lasted until Mrs. Haydn's death in 1800, was an unhappy one.

The end of Haydn's appointment with Morzin is narrated by another early biographer, Albert Christoph Dies (1810):

A year passed without Count Morzin's knowing of the marriage of his Kapellmeister, but something else came up to alter Haydn's situation. The Count found himself obliged to reduce his heretofore great expenditures. He dismissed his musicians and so Haydn lost his post as Kapellmeister.

Meanwhile Haydn had the great recommendation of a public reputation; his amiable character was known; Count Morzin was moved to be useful on his behalf--three circumstances that combined so fortunately that Haydn soon after he ceased to be Kapellmeister to Count Morzin (1760) was taken on as Vicekapellmeister ... in the service of Prince Anton Esterházy ... at Eisenstadt, with a salary of 400 florins.

Since Haydn was Kapellmeister at Eisenstadt in all but name, the incumbent Kapellmeister being infirm, his move to the Esterházy family served as a large career advancement. He continued on there in the same line of work, as composer, conductor, and administrator, but this time employed by a wealthier family.

== The Haydn symphonies written for Count Morzin ==
Establishing just which of the Haydn symphonies were written for the Morzin orchestra is partly a matter of conjecture. Haydn scholar James Webster, following earlier research and his own efforts, produced the following list: 1, 2, 4, 5, 10, 11, 18, 27, 32, 37, A, which was used in determining the contents of the opening "Morzin" volume for Christopher Hogwood's recording of the Haydn symphonies. A second volume of roughly equal length consists of symphonies that may have been composed for Morzin, though they equally well could have been composed for the Esterházy family. An earlier conjecture for which symphonies were written for Count Morzin was made by H. C. Robbins Landon, specifically numbers 1, 37, 18, 19, 2, B, 16, 17, 15, 4, 10, 32, 5, 11, 33, 27, A, 3, and 20.
