= List of symphonies in D major =

This is a list of symphonies in D major written by notable composers.

Composer	Symphony
Hugo Alfvén	Symphony No. 2, Op. 11 (1897-98)
Kurt Atterberg	Symphony No. 3 "Västkustbilder", Op. 10 (1914-16)
Carl Philipp Emanuel Bach	Symphony in D major, Wq.176 / H651 (1755, rev. later); Symphony in D major, Wq.183:1 / H663 (1775)
Johann Christian Bach	Symphony/Overture Op.3 No. 1 / W C1 (1765); Symphony Op. 6 No.2 / W C8 (1769); Symphony Op. 8 No.3 / W C14; Symphony Op. 18 No. 3 / W.C deest (1782); Symphony/Overture Op. 18 No. 4 / W C27 (1782, Also issued in 2 Symphonies, Op.18 No.2); Symphony/Overture, W.G 22; Symphony/Overture, W.G 23b; Symphony, Op. 18 No. 1 (1785)
Wilhelm Friedemann Bach	Sinfonia, Falck 64/BR C 8 (c.1755)
Ludwig van Beethoven	Symphony No. 2, Op. 36 (1801-02)
Victor Bendix	Symphony No. 2 "Sommerklange fra Sydrusland", Op. 20 (1886-87)
Franz Berwald	Symphony No. 2 "Capricieuse" (1842)
Luigi Boccherini	Symphony in D major, G 500 (1767); Symphony Op. 21 No. 4, G. 496 (1775); Symphony Op. 12 No. 1, G 503 (1771); Symphony Op. 35 No.1, G. 509 (1782); Symphony Op. 37 No. 2, G. 516 (1786, lost); Symphony Op. 42, G. 520 (1789); Symphony Op. 43, G. 521, (1790); Symphony Op. 45, G 522 (1792)
Sergei Bortkiewicz	Symphony No. 1 "From My Homeland", Op. 52 (1945)
Johannes Brahms	Symphony No. 2, Op. 73 (1877)
Havergal Brian	Symphony No. 24 (1965)
Howard Brockway	Symphony, Op. 12 (1894)
Fritz Brun	Symphony No. 7 (1937)
Norbert Burgmüller	Symphony No. 2, Op. 11 (1834-6, unfinished)
Luigi Cherubini	Symphony in D major (1815)
Muzio Clementi	Symphony Op. 18 No. 2 (published 1787); Symphony "No. 2" WoO 33 (incomplete) (begun 1819); Symphony "No. 4" WoO 35 (incomplete) (premiered 1822)
Carl Czerny	Symphony in D major (1814); Symphony No. 2, Op. 781 (published 1847)
Eric DeLamarter	Symphony No. 1 (1914)
Antonín Dvořák	Symphony No. 6, Op. 60, B. 112 (1880)
George Enescu	Symphony No. 5 (1941-46, completed by Cornel Țăranu and Pascal Bentoiu)
Louise Farrenc	Symphony No. 2, Op. 35 (1845)
Frederic Ernest Fesca	Symphony No. 2, Op. 10 (1809-13); Symphony No. 3, Op. 13 (1816)
Josef Bohuslav Foerster	Symphony No. 3, Op. 36 (1895)
Richard Franck	Symphony in D major (c.1900)
Florian Leopold Gassmann	Symphonies Hill 1, 3, 5, 7, 9, 46, 82, 101, 103, 104. Also, a symphony in D major which might be by Baldassare Galuppi.
William W. Gilchrist	Symphony No. 2
Alexander Glazunov	Symphony No. 3, Op. 33 (1888-90)
Charles Gounod	Symphony No. 1 (1843-55)
Christoph Graupner	45 Symphonies, GWV 511-546
Joseph Haydn	Symphony No. 1 (1759); Symphony No. 4 (1762); Symphony No. 6, Le Matin (1761); Symphony No. 10 (1760); Symphony No. 13 (1763); Symphony No. 15 (1764); Symphony No. 19 (1759-60); Symphony No. 24 (1764); Symphony No. 31 Hornsignal (1765); Symphony No. 42 (1771); Symphony No. 53, L'impériale (1778-79); Symphony No. 57 (1774); Symphony No. 61 (1776); Symphony No. 62 (1780); Symphony No. 70 (1778-80); Symphony No. 72 (1763-65); Symphony No. 73, La Chasse (1781-82); Symphony No. 75 (1779); Symphony No. 86 (1786); Symphony No. 93 (1791); Symphony No. 96, The Miracle (1791); Symphony No. 101, The Clock (1794); Symphony No. 104, London (1795); Symphony in D major, Hob I:106 (Only first movement is extant; sometimes used as the overture to Le pescatrici)
Michael Haydn	Symphony No. 1A, MH 24 (1758?); Symphony No. 8, MH 69, Perger 38 (1764); Symphony No. 9, MH 50, Perger 36 (1760?); Symphony No. 13, MH 132, Perger 37 (1768?); Symphony No. 15, MH 150, Perger 41 (1771); Symphony No. 19, MH 198, Perger 11 (1774); Symphony No. 21, MH 272, Perger 42 (1778); Symphony No. 23, MH 287, Perger 43 (1779); Symphony No. 30, MH 399, Perger 21 (1785); Symphony No. 32, MH 420, Perger 23 (1786); Symphony No. 37, MH 476, Perger 29 (1788)
Leopold Hofmann	10 Symphonies, Kimball D1-10
August Klughardt	Symphony No. 3, Op. 37 (1879)
Lev Knipper	Symphony No. 4 "Poem for the Komsomol Fighters" Op. 41 (1933-34, rev. 1966); Symphony No. 7 "Military" (1938)
Victor Kolar	Symphony No. 1
Leopold Kozeluch	Symphony L'Arlechino, P I: 1; Symphony Op. 22 No. 1, P I: 3; Symphony P I:D1 (lost); Symphony P I:D2; Symphony P I:D3
Joseph Martin Kraus	Sinfonia Da Chiesa, VB 146; Symphony Sigmaringen 5 (lost), VB Anhang 11
Franz Krommer	Symphony No. 2, Op. 40, P I:2 (published 1803); Symphony No. 3, Op. 62, P I:3 (1807); Symphony No. 6, P I:6 (1823); Symphony in D major P I:D1
Joseph Küffner	Symphony No. 1, Op.75 (1818); Symphony No. 7, Op. 164 (pub. 1826)
Franz Lachner	Symphony No. 6, Op. 56 (1837)
László Lajtha	Symphony No. 4 "Le Printemps", Op.52 (1950)
Eduard Lassen	Symphony No. 1 in D major (performed 1867)
Adolf Fredrik Lindblad	Symphony No. 2 (c.1855)
Gustav Mahler	Symphony No. 1 (1888)
Étienne Méhul	Symphony No. 2 (1808-09)
Krzysztof Meyer	Symphony in D major "in Mozartean Style", Op. 41 (1976)
Mihály Mosonyi	Symphony No. 1 (1842-44)
Alexander Moyzes	Symphony No. 1, Op. 31 (1929, rev. 1937)
Wolfgang Amadeus Mozart	Symphony No.4, K. 19 (1765); Symphony No. 7, K. 45 (1768); Symphony No. 8, K. 48 (1768); Symphony No. 11, K. 84 (1770, doubtful); Symphony in D major, K. 111+120 (1771); Symphony No. 20, K. 133 (1772); Symphony in D major, K. 161/141a (1772); Symphony No. 23, K. 181 (1773); Symphony No. 30, K. 202 (1774); Symphony in D major, K. 196+121 (1774-75); Symphony in D major, K. 204/213a (1775); Symphony in D major, K. 250/248b (1776); Symphony No. 31 "Paris", K. 297 (1778); Symphony in D major, K. 320 (1779); Symphony No. 35 "Haffner, K. 385 (1782); Symphony No. 38 "Prague", K. 504 (1786)
Nikolai Myaskovsky	Symphony No. 5, Op. 18 (1917-9)
Otto Nicolai	Symphony No. 2 (1835, rev. 1845)
Václav Pichl	Symphony "Diana", Zakin 16; Symphony "Sinfonia Pastorale", Zakin 17; Symphony Op. 1 No. 1, Zakin 19 (1769-70); Symphony Op. 8 No.3 (1784); Symphony Op. 15 No.1 (1790); Symphony Op. 17, Zakin 33 (1790)
Willem Pijper	Symphony No. 1 "Pan", K. 37 (1917)
Ignaz Pleyel	Symphony Op. 3 No. 1, B.124 (1782-84); Symphony Op. 31 No. 2, B.126 (1785); Symphony Op. 12 No. 1, B.133 (1786); Symphony Op. 33 No. 1, B.145 (1790); Symphony in D major, B.147A; Symphony in D major, B.161
Sergei Prokofiev	Symphony No. 1 "Classical", Op. 25 (1917)
Joachim Raff	Symphony No. 1 "To the Fatherland", Op. 96 (1859-61)
Ferdinand Ries	Symphony No. 1, Op. 23 (1809); Symphony No. 6, Op. 146 (1822)
Jean Rivier	Symphony No. 1 (1931)
Gabriel Rodó	Symphony No. 2 (1957)
Julius Röntgen	Symphony No. 10 "Walzer-Symphony" (1930); Symphony No. 14 "Winterthur" (1930)
Joly Braga Santos	Symphony No. 1 (1947)
Franz Schubert	Symphony in D major, D 2B/997 (1811?, unfinished); Symphony No. 1, D 82 (1813); Symphony No. 3, D 200 (1815); Symphony in D major, D 615 (1818, unfinished); Symphony in D major, D 708A (1820-21, unfinished); Symphony No. 10, D 936A (1828?, unfinished)
Giovanni Sgambati	Symphony No. 1, Op.16 (1880-81)
Jean Sibelius	Symphony No. 2, Op. 43 (1901-2)
Christian Sinding	Symphony No. 2, Op. 83 (1904)
David Stanley Smith	Symphony No. 2, Op. 42 (1917)
Charles Villiers Stanford	Symphony No. 5 "L'allegro ed il penseroso", Op. 56 (1894)
Maximilian Steinberg	Symphony No. 1, Op. 3 (1905-6)
Johan Svendsen	Symphony No. 1, Op. 4 (1865-67)
Pyotr Ilyich Tchaikovsky	Symphony No. 3 "Polish", Op. 29 (1875)
Donald Francis Tovey	Symphony, Op. 32 (1913, rev. 1923)
Ralph Vaughan Williams	Symphony No. 5 (1938-43)
Jan Václav Voříšek	Symphony, Op. 23 (1822-23)
Pavel Vranický	Symphony, Op. 16 No. 3 (published 1791); Symphony "La Chasse", Op. 25 (published 1793); Symphony, Op. 36; Symphony, Op. 37; Symphony, Op. 52
Christopher Ernst Friedrich Weyse	Symphony No. 3, DF 119 (1795, rev. 1800)
Carl Friedrich Abel	Symphony/Overture in D major, Op. 1 No. 3, D28/E3 (1759?); Symphony/Overture in D major, Op. 4 No. 1, D32/E7 (1762); Symphony/Overture in D major, Op. 4 No. 6, D37/E12 (1762); Symphony in D major, Op. 7 No. 3, E15 (1767); Symphony in D major, Op. 10 No. 5, E23 (1773); Symphony/Overture in D major, Op. 14 No. 3, E27; Sinfonia in D major, Op. 17 No. 3, E33 (1783); Symphony in D major, Six Prussian Symphonies No. 4, E44; Symphony in D major, Six Prussian Symphonies No. 6, E46
Johann Christoph Friedrich Bach	Symphony in D major, BR-JCFB C 1 / Wf I/5 (ca. 1768, lost); Symphony in D major, BR-JCFB C 11 / Wf I/8 (ca. 1770, lost); Symphony in D major, BR-JCFB C 13 / Wf I/9 (ca. 1770, lost); Symphony in D major, BR-JCFB C 19 / Wf I/11 (ca. 1792, lost); Symphony in D major, BR-JCFB C 21 / Wf I/13 (ca. 1792, lost); Symphony in D major "Grand Symphony", BR-JCFB C 26 / Wf I/16 ca. 1792, lost)
Kōsaku Yamada	Choreographic Symphony "Maria Magdalena" (1916–18)
