= Symphony No. 51 =

Symphony No. 51 may refer to:

- Symphony No. 51 (Haydn) in B-flat major (Hoboken I/51) by Joseph Haydn, 1773–74
- Symphony No. 51 (Mozart) in D major (K. 196+121) by Wolfgang Amadeus Mozart, 1774–75
