= K196 =

K196 or K-196 may refer to:

- K-196 (Kansas highway), state highway in Kansas
- Symphony, K. 196+121 (Mozart)
