= Symphony No. 58 (Haydn) =

Symphony by Joseph Haydn

Joseph Haydn

Symphony No. 58 in F major, Hoboken I/58, is a symphony by Joseph Haydn, composed probably around 1767 but certainly not after 1774, after which time the traits of this symphony were outmoded.

Symphony No. 58 was probably written by Haydn in 1767. At that time he worked as Kapellmeister for Prince Nikolaus Esterhazy. If we compare Symphony No. 58 with Symphony No. 35, also written in 1767, No. 58 has the opposite structure. Ludwig Finscher described the two works:

Symphonies No. 58 in F major and 35 in B-flat major can be considered (...) as if it were a mirror pair of works: the symphony in F major moves from a leisurely, working performance with comic contrasts of the head part to a harmless andante to a completely eccentric one with the wildest contrasts, the finale, played out in a limited space; between them is the famous "Minuet alla soppa" (...). The symphony in B-flat major goes the opposite way: from the very dramatic headpiece, already in the exposition, to the melancholic andante and the finale, in which the notes of buffa sound.

The performance takes about 20 minutes.

== Music ==
The symphony is scored for two oboes, two horns, two violins, viola, cello, and double bass. Modern performers continue to debate whether a bassoon, and – contentiously – a harpsichord should be added.

It is in four movements:

1. Allegro, 3/4
2. Andante, 2/4
3. Menuet alla zoppa – Trio. Un poco allegretto, 3/4
4. Finale: Presto, 3/8

The unique distinction alla zoppa on the Menuet literally means "limping" which Haydn accomplishes with a dotted rhythm pushed into all sorts of asymmetrical patterns. This movement was also used in Haydn's Baryton Trio in D major (Hob 11/52).

A. Peter Brown has noted how the character of the first movement is very reminiscent of a minuet, and can be regarded as an "expanded Minuet". Brown has also commented that the overall nature of the work highly resembles a suite where all four movements are dance-like in nature.
