= Symphony No. 12 (Haydn) =

Symphony in three movements by Joseph Haydn

Joseph Haydn

The Symphony No. 12 in E major (Hoboken I/12) is a symphony by Joseph Haydn. The symphony was composed in 1763, at the age of 31, under the patronage of Prince Nikolaus Esterházy.

It is scored for two oboes, bassoon, two horns, strings, and continuo. The symphony is homotonal and in three movements:

1. Allegro, 2/2
2. Adagio, 6/8 in E minor
3. Presto, 2/4

The second movement is in "siciliano", or rocking rhythm, similar to the pastoral slow movements of Symphonies No. 27 and B.
