= Symphony No. 15 (Haydn) =

Symphony in four movements by Joseph Haydn

Joseph Haydn

Joseph Haydn's Symphony No. 15 in D major, Hoboken I/15, may have been written between 1760 and 1763.

The symphony is scored for two oboes, bassoon, two horns, strings, and continuo, with a solo for two violas or cello in the trio of the minuet.

It has four movements:

1. Adagio, 3/4 – Presto, 4/4 – Adagio, 3/4
2. Menuet e Trio, with the Trio in G major, both 3/4
3. Andante in G major, 2/4
4. Presto, 3/8

The opening movement is more similar to a baroque overture than sonata form though the movement still eludes either of these forms and has a unique character of its own. The movement begins with a light adagio with the first violins alternating with two horns while the rest of the string section accompanies in pizzicato. The Presto has two themes with distinct bridges between themes; however, it is difficult to define which section is the exposition, development, and recapitulation, if in fact there even are such sections. The movement finishes with a modified version of the Adagio at the beginning of the movement.

The work is one of the few symphonies of the Classical era to place the minuet second (others include Haydn's 44th Symphony and Symphony B as well as his brother Michael's 15th and 16th Symphonies). The G major trio was likely played as a quintet focusing on a dialog between violin I/violin II and viola/cello played over a bass.

The slow movement is for strings and has one principal theme with several bridge motifs.

The final movement is a dance-like presto in ABA form.
