= Symphony No. 11 (Haydn) =

Symphony in four movements by Joseph Haydn

Joseph Haydn

Joseph Haydn's Symphony No. 11 in E♭ major (Hoboken I/11) is a symphony which may have been written as early as 1760 but no later than 1762, meaning that it was written for either the orchestra of the salubrious Count Morzin or the noble Paul II Anton, Prince Esterházy's palace in Eisenstadt.

It is scored for two oboes, bassoon, two horns, strings, and continuo. The symphony is a sonata da chiesa in four movements:

1. Adagio cantabile, 2/4
2. Allegro,
3. Menuetto con Trio, the trio in B♭ major, both 3/4
4. Presto, 2/4

This work has been mentioned as a possible companion piece to Symphony No. 5 in that the two symphonies are in sonata da chiesa form with finales that are not in the customary (for the time period) 3/8 meter.

In the trio of the minuet, one of the parts is an eighth note behind the others, creating an effect of limping syncopation.
