= Symphony No. 16 (Michael Haydn) =

Portrait of Michael Haydn by Franz Xaver Hornöck

Michael Haydn's Symphony No. 16 in A major, Perger 6, Sherman 16, Sherman-adjusted 17, MH 152, was written in Salzburg in 1771. This symphony was at one time attributed to Joseph Haydn, the ninth work in A major so attributed in Anthony van Hoboken's catalogue.

The symphony is scored for two oboes, two bassoons, two horns, and strings. It has four movements:

1. Allegro molto
2. Minuet and Trio (in A minor)
3. Andante (in D major)
4. Allegro molto

The placement of the minuet second, before the slow movement, is unusual in Haydn's symphonies, though there is one other specimen, Symphony No. 15, which scholars are fairly certain is a close contemporary to this one. Three symphonies by brother Joseph Haydn also have this placement, 32, 37, and 44.

The corresponding placement of the scherzo second in the Romantic era, despite Beethoven's Symphony No. 9, was rare until Bruckner's Eighth and Ninth Symphonies and Mahler's First, Fourth and Sixth Symphonies.

== Discography ==
This work is included in a set of 20 symphonies on the CPO label with Bohdan Warchal conducting the Slovak Philharmonic, on disc 4. It is also available in a performance by the London Mozart Players conducted by Matthias Bamert on the Chandos label, the Capella Savaria conducted by Pál Németh on the Hungaroton label, and the Franz Liszt Kammerorchester conducted by János Rolla on Teldec.
