= Symphony A (Haydn) =

Symphony in three movements by Joseph Haydn

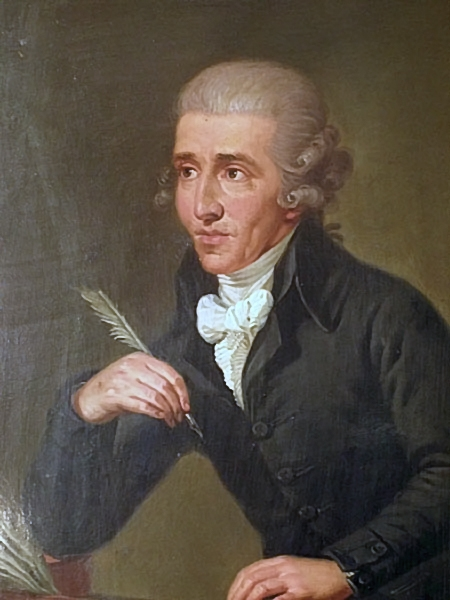
Portrait by Ludwig Guttenbrunn, painted c. 1791–92, of Joseph Haydn c. 1770

Joseph Haydn's Symphony A in B♭ major, Hoboken I/107, was written between 1757 and 1760. The symphony therefore must have been composed for Count Morzin's orchestra, for whom Haydn worked until 1761. It is not in the usual numbering scheme for Haydn symphonies because it was originally thought to be a string quartet (Op. 1/5) by 19th century scholars and was catalogued as Hob. III/5.

It is scored for two oboes, bassoon, two horns in B♭ alto, strings, and continuo.

The symphony has three movements:

1. Allegro, 3/4
2. Andante, 2/4 in E♭ major
3. Allegro molto, 6/8
