= Keyboard Concerto No. 11 (Haydn) =

Concerto composed by Joseph Haydn

Keyboard Concerto in D major
- No. 11
- by Joseph Haydn
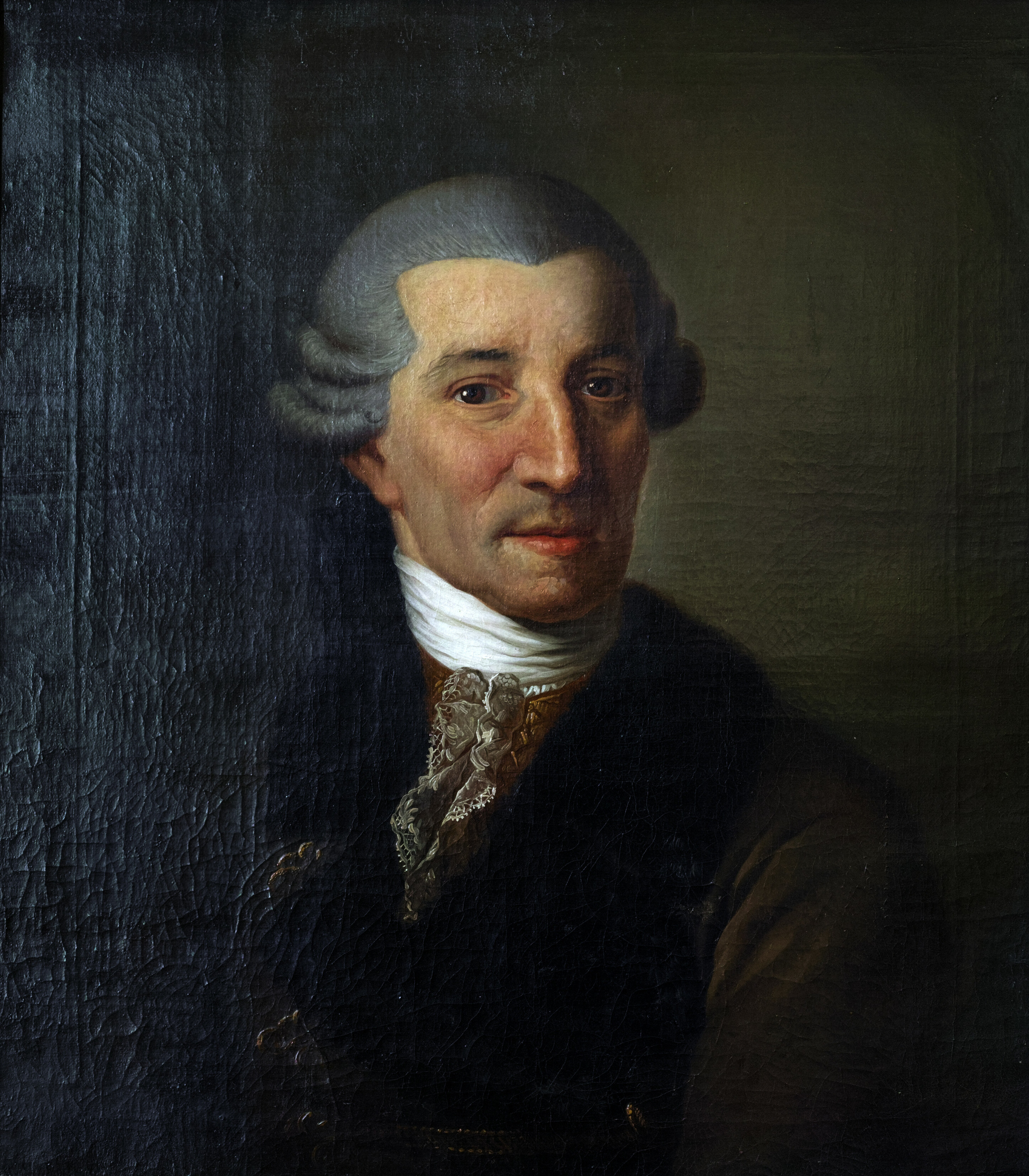
- Portrait of the composer in 1780s
- Catalogue: Hob. XVIII/11
- Style: Classical period
- Composed: 1780–1783
- Published: 1784
- Movements: Three

Joseph Haydn's Keyboard Concerto in D major, Hob. XVIII:11, was written between 1780 and 1783 and published in 1784, his last concerto for keyboard. He composed it for harpsichord or fortepiano, scoring for orchestra in the relatively undeveloped galant style of his earlier works, but, being a somewhat late composition, the work has similarities to Mozart's piano concertos; Haydn and Mozart had probably become acquainted by 1783 and the friendship had a deep impact on both composers.

(Mozart returned from Italy in 1773, at the age of seventeen, and turned to the piano concerto form in 1776. Biographers and historians have suggested that this Haydn work reflects Mozart's influence. Mozart acknowledged the important role of Haydn in the development of music and in correspondence often referred to him as "Papa Haydn".)

== Form ==
The work has three movements, the last of which is a lively Hungarian rondo:

1. Vivace (in D major)
2. Un poco adagio (in A major)
3. Rondo all'Ungarese (in D major)

The first and second movements contain cadenzas which have been preserved in the original score, handwritten by Haydn.

The work is scored for solo keyboard and an orchestra consisting of two oboes, two horns in D, and strings. Nowadays, it mostly is played on piano.

== See also ==
- List of concertos by Joseph Haydn
