= 1767 in music =

== Events ==
- February 22 – Lovisa Augusti performs at a concert in Gothenburg directed by a musician of the Hovkapellet.
- September 11 – Eleven-year-old Wolfgang Amadeus Mozart, his father Leopold, his mother Anna Maria, and his older sister Nannerl) left Salzburg for Vienna, travelling via Melk (where young Wolfgang plays the organ). A few weeks later, an outbreak of smallpox in Vienna causes them to flee the city, and they travel to Brno.
- October 26 – Wolfgang Amadeus Mozart is diagnosed with smallpox. He recovers by November 10, but Nannerl then contracts the disease; she also survives.
- Dictionnaire de musique by Jean-Jacques Rousseau is published.
- Wolfgang Amadeus Mozart composes the first act of an oratorio, Die Schuldigkeit des ersten Gebots, to be completed by Michael Haydn and Anton Cajetan Adlgasser.
- Joseph Haydn enters his Sturm und Drang period - writing symphonies in minor keys with turbulent expressive content.

== Popular music ==
- James Hook's first collection of songs for the Vauxhall Gardens.

== Opera ==
- Felice Alessandri – Ezio
- Michael Arne – Cymon
- Christoph Willibald Gluck – Alceste
- Johann Adam Hiller – Lottchen am Hofe
- Wolfgang Amadeus Mozart – Apollo et Hyacinthus
- Josef Mysliveček
  - Il Bellerofonte
  - Farnace , ED.10:D5
- Giovanni Paisiello – L'idolo cinese, R.1.10
- Johann Adolph Hasse – Partenope

== Classical music ==
- Carl Friedrich Abel – 6 Symphonies, Op. 7
- Thomas Arne – Four Symphonies
- Luigi Boccherini – Symphony in D major, G.500
- Joseph Haydn
  - Symphony No.35 in B-flat major, Hob.I:35
  - Symphony no 39
  - 6 Flute Quartets, Op. 5 (Amsterdam: J. J. Hummel)
  - String Trio in E-flat major, Hob.V:4
  - Divertimento in C major, Hob.XIV:3
  - Divertimento in G major, Hob.XVI:11 (attribution in contest)
  - Divertimento in A major, Hob.XVI:12
- Michael Haydn – Divertimento for 2 basset-horns, 2 horns and bassoon in C
- Gabriele Leone – 6 Sonatas for mandolin and basso continuo, Book 1 opus 1
- Antonio Lolli – 6 Violin Sonatas, Op. 3
- Wolfgang Amadeus Mozart
  - Die Schuldigkeit des ersten Gebotes, K.35
  - Piano Concerto No.1 in F major, K.37
  - Piano Concerto No.3 in D major, K.40
  - A Berenice, K.70/61c
- Josef Mysliveček – 6 String Quartets, Op. 2
- Giuseppe Paolucci – Preces octo vocibus concinendae in oratione quadraginta horarum
- Antonio Sacchini – Sinfonia in D major
- William Selby – 10 Voluntarys

== Methods and music theory ==
- Johann Daniel Berlin – Anleitung zur Tonometrie (Kopenhagen and Leipzig: Friedrich Christian Pelt)
- Johann Philipp Kirnberger – Der allezeit fertige Polonoisen- und Menuettencomponist (Berlin: George Ludewig Winter), a method for composing by throwing dice
- Johannes Schmidlin – Deutliche Anleitung zum gründlichen Singen der Psalmen (Zürich: Bürgkli)
- Granville Sharp – A Short Introduction to Vocal Musick
- Georg Andreas Sorge – Anleitung zur Fantasie

== Births ==
- March 17 – Luigi Capotorti, Italian composer (died 1842)
- March 19 – Leonhard von Call, Austrian composer (died 1815)
- April 27 – Andreas Romberg, violinist and composer (died 1821)
- May 4 – Tyagaraja – composer and singer (died 1848)
- September 17 – Henri Montan Berton, composer, teacher and writer, son of Pierre Montan Berton (died 1844)
- September 20 – José Maurício Nunes Garcia, composer (died 1830)
- September 26 – Wenzel Müller, composer (died 1835)
- November 13 – Bernhard Romberg, cellist and composer (died 1841)
- December 8 – Fabre d'Olivet, French poet and composer (died 1825)
- December 10 – Johannes Spech, Hungarian composer (died 1836)
- December 13 – August Eberhard Müller, German composer (died 1817)
- date unknown
  - Gottlieb Graupner, musician, composer, educator and publisher (died 1836)
  - Filip Višnjić, poet and guslar player (died 1834)
  - Luigi Zamboni, operatic bass-baritone (died 1837)
- probable
  - Lewis Lavenu, music seller and publisher (died 1818)

== Deaths ==
- January 3 – Luca Antonio Predieri, composer (born 1688)
- April 7 – Franz Sparry, composer (born 1715)
- June 22 – Johan Henrik Freithoff, violinist and composer (born 1713)
- June 25 – Georg Philipp Telemann, composer (born 1681)
- July 3 – Matthew Dubourg, violinist, conductor and composer (born 1707)
- August 28 – Johann Schobert, harpsichordist and composer (b. c. 1720)
- September 10 – Charles John Frederick Lampe, organist and composer (born 1739)
