= Symphony No. 23 (Haydn) =

Symphony in four movements by Joseph Haydn

Joseph Haydn

Joseph Haydn wrote Symphony No. 23 in G major, Hoboken I/23, in 1764. The symphony is scored for two oboes, bassoon, two horns, and strings with continuo.

It is in four movements:

1. Allegro, 3/4
2. Andante in C major, 2/4
3. Menuetto e Trio (Trio in C major), 3/4
4. Presto assai, 6/8

The slow movement is scored for strings only and contains numerous five-note 32nd-note slides in the lower strings.

In the minuet, Haydn writes the movement as a canon between the higher voices (violins and oboes) and lower voices (violas and cellos) at an interval of a single bar. Haydn had written such a canon in the minuet of his third symphony and similar canons would be later be written into G major minuets by Michael Haydn and Mozart. Haydn himself would later develop this technique into the "Canones in Diapason" of the minuet of his Trauer Symphony and the "Witches Minuet" of his D minor string quartet from Op. 76.

The last movement is notable for fading away unexpectedly at the end, first pianissimo in the string along and then after a grand pause ending with a single pizzicato note. The second half is marked for repeat, but the conductor may choose "whether to omit the da capo in order not to risk the surprise ending being anticipated." H. C. Robbins Landon believes this may be "the first positive example of Haydn's famous sense of humour."
