= Symphony No. 47 (Haydn) =

Symphony in four movements by Joseph Haydn

- Palindrome
- by Joseph Haydn
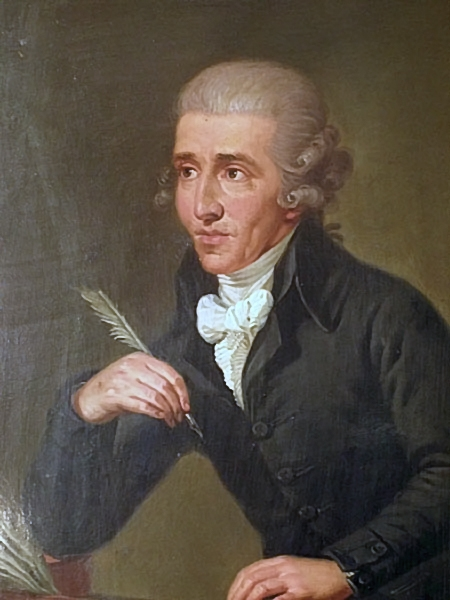
- Portrait of Joseph Haydn by Ludwig Guttenbrunn
- Key: G major
- Catalogue: Hob. I:47
- Year: 1772
- Duration: Around 25 minutes
- Movements: 4
- Scoring: Orchestra

Joseph Haydn's Symphony No. 47 in G major, Hob. I:47, was probably written in 1772. It was nicknamed The Palindrome.

== Music ==
Scored for two oboes, bassoon, two horns, and strings., it is in four movements:

1. Allegro, 4/4
2. Un poco adagio cantabile, 2/4 in D major
3. Menuetto e Trio, 3/4
4. Presto assai, 2/2

The opening movement begins with a hammerstroke and a dotted-rhythm fanfare of repeated notes which serves as the first theme for the sonata-form movement. The line between the development and recapitulation is blurred by the reappearance of the dotted-rhythm in G minor (the home tonic but the wrong mode) followed by standard recapitulation of the second theme group. The first theme is finally resolved in the concluding coda.

The slow movement is a theme with four variations in invertible counterpoint. Through the third variation, each appearance of the ternary theme with winds appearing only in the middle section features muted strings in the outer sections. In the second outer section, the theme in two voices is inverted. Also, through each of the first three variations the surface rhythms are accelerating from eighth notes to sixteenth notes to triplet-sixteenths to thirty-seconds. The fourth variation varies from this pattern in that it is fully scored for the entire variation and serves as a recapitulation for the movement. What follows is a coda where the theme slowly dies away.

The "Minuetto al Roverso" is the reason this symphony is sometimes called "The Palindrome": the second part of the Minuet is the same as the first but backwards, and the Trio is also written in this way.

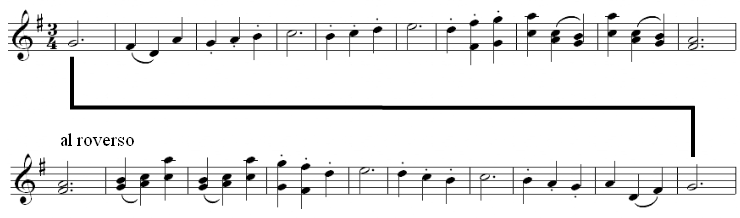
