= Symphony No. 37 (Haydn) =

Symphony by Joseph Haydn

Joseph Haydn

The Symphony No. 37 in C major, Hob. I/37, is a symphony by Joseph Haydn. The numbering is misleading, as it is one of Haydn's earliest symphonies. A copy of the score found at Český Krumlov, Czech Republic, is dated 1758. It can be presumed it was written for the orchestra of Count Morzin, in which Haydn was employed until February 1761.

This symphony is a candidate for the first one he ever had written, if his Symphony No. 1 was not indeed his first symphony.

== Music ==
The work is scored for two oboes, bassoon, two horns (or two trumpets, timpani) and strings possibly with continuo. It is possible the trumpet and timpani parts were added later.

The work is in four movements:

1. Presto (C major, 168 bars, 2/4)
2. Menuet e Trio (C major and C minor (Trio), 24 bars and 26 bars (Trio), 3/4
3. Andante, C minor, 71 bars, 2/4
4. Presto, C major, 82 bars, 3/8

The key organization limited to C major and C minor in the four movements indicates perhaps a reliance on the Baroque suites as a guide for tonal organization of the movements, the influence of the first three symphonies by C.P.E. Bach, or an early simplicity of tonal language. (Haydn was in his mid-20s at the composition of this symphony.)

=== I. Presto ===
Similarities have been drawn between the 2/4 opening movement and the 2/4 finale to Georg von Reutter's Servizio di tavola in C major from 1757. The two knew each other because Reutter was the director of music in St. Stephen's Cathedral where Haydn sang as a child.

=== II. Menuet e Trio ===
The work is one of the few symphonies of the Classical era to place the Minuet second (others include Haydn's 32nd and 44th, and his brother Michael's 15th and 16th). The IMSLP reverses the order of the Menuet e Trio and the Andante, thus bringing the movement order to the standard that was eventually established as common practice.

=== III. Andante ===
The slow movement is very similar to the slow movement in one of Haydn's earliest piano sonatas, Hob. XVI:Es2.
