= Symphony No. 9 (Haydn) =

Symphony in three movements by Joseph Haydn

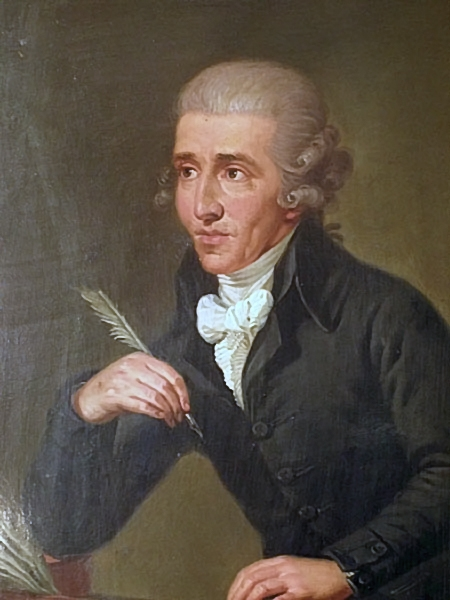
Portrait by Ludwig Guttenbrunn, painted c. 1791–92, depicting Joseph Haydn c. 1770

The Symphony No. 9 in C major, Hoboken I/9, is a symphony by Joseph Haydn. The symphony was composed in 1762, under the auspices of Nikolaus Esterházy, who allowed the symphony to be performed in Eisenstadt.

It is scored for two flutes, two oboes, bassoon, two horns, strings, and continuo. The flutes are used in place of the oboes in the slow movement and mainly double the first violins an octave higher.

The work is in three movements:

1. Allegro molto, 2/4
2. Andante, G major, 2/4
3. Minuetto e Trio, Allegretto, both 3/4

While it was not unusual to end a three-movement symphony with a minuet, such a minuet generally was without a trio. The trio here features a solo oboe with wind-band interludes.
