= Symphony No. 3 (Haydn) =

Symphony by Joseph Haydn

Joseph Haydn

Joseph Haydn's Symphony No. 3 in G major, Hoboken I/3, is believed to have been written between 1760 and 1762. The symphony is scored for two oboes, bassoon, two horns, strings, and continuo. It was one of the earliest symphonies to have four movements:

1. Allegro, 3/4
2. Andante moderato in G minor, 2/4
3. Minuet and Trio, 3/4
4. Allegro,

The winds are not used in the slow movement, but the trio of the minuet shows "the first emergence of winds from their earlier rôle ... in the earliest divertimenti for winds and strings."

The Minuet is a canon between the higher and lower voices at the distance of one bar. Haydn would later write a similar canon in the minuet of his 23rd Symphony and similar canons would be later be written into G major minuets by Michael Haydn and Mozart. Later still, Haydn himself would develop this technique into the "Canones in Diapason" of the minuet of his Trauer Symphony and the "Witches' Minuet" of his D minor string quartet from Op. 76.

The Finale is also contrapuntal. It is a fugue with two subjects that also integrates elements of sonata form.
