= List of concertos by Joseph Haydn =

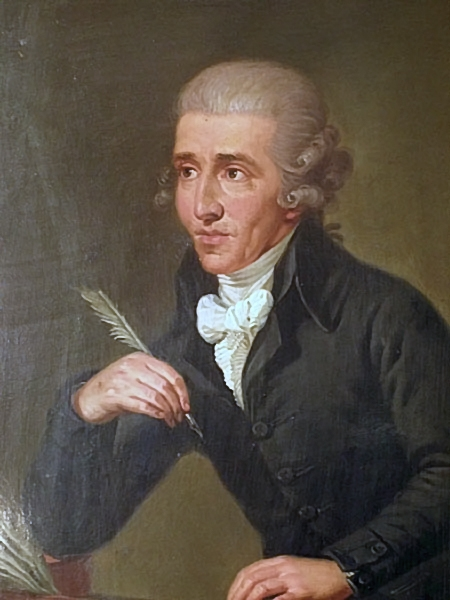
Portrait by Ludwig Guttenbrunn, painted c. 1791–92, depicts Haydn c. 1770

The following is a partial list of concertos by Joseph Haydn (1732–1809). In the Hoboken catalogue of Haydn's works, concertos for most instruments are in category VII with a different letter for each solo instrument (VIIa is for violin concertos, VIIb is for cello concertos, etc.). The exceptions are the concertos for keyboard and for baryton which are placed in categories XVIII and XIII, respectively.

Haydn also wrote several more concertos, which have all been lost.

== For violin ==
- Violin Concerto No. 1 in C major, Hob. VIIa:1 (ca. 1765)
- Violin Concerto No. 2 in D major, Hob. VIIa:2 (1765, lost)
- Violin Concerto No. 3 in A major, Hob. VIIa:3 "Melker Konzert" (ca. 1770)
- Violin Concerto No. 4 in G major, Hob. VIIa:4 (1769)

Other Concertos (Hob. VIIa:D1/G1/A1/B1/B2) are not authentic, i.e. are not by Joseph Haydn.

- D1 - Concerto in D major for violin and orchestra (2 oboes, 2 horns, 2 violins, viola and bass) (work by Carl Stamitz?)
- G1 - Concerto in G major for violin and strings (2 violins, viola and bass) (work by Michael Haydn?) (1762)
- A1 - Concerto in A major for violin and … (work by Giovanni Mane Giornovichi?)
- B1 - Concerto in B♭ major for violin and strings (2 violins, viola and bass) (by Michael Haydn) (1760)
- B2 - Concerto in B♭ major for violin and strings (2 violins, viola and bass) (by Christian Cannabich) (1767)

== For violoncello ==
- Cello Concerto No. 1 in C, Hob. VIIb:1 (1761-5)
- Cello Concerto No. 2 in D, Hob. VIIb:2 (Op. 101) (1783)
- Cello Concerto No. 3 in C, Hob. VIIb:3 (ca. 1780, lost)
- Cello Concerto No. 4 in D, Hob. VIIb:4 (spurious, written by Giovanni Battista Costanzi in the 1750s)
- Cello Concerto No. 5 in C, Hob. VIIb:5 (spurious, written by David Popper in 1899)
- Cello Concerto in G minor, Hob. VIIb:g1 (ca. 1773, doubtful, lost)

== For violone (double bass) ==
- Violone Concerto in D, Hob. VIIc:1 (lost; may have been burned and destroyed?)

== For horn ==
- Horn Concerto in D major, Hob. VIId:1 (1765, lost)
- Concerto for Two Horns in E♭, Hob. VIId:2 (ca. 1760, lost)
- Horn Concerto No. 1 in D, Hob. VIId:3 (1762)
- Horn Concerto No. 2 in D, Hob. VIId:4 (uncertain; possibly by Michael Haydn) (1767)
- Concerto for Two Horns in E♭, Hob. VIId:5 (uncertain; possibly by Antonio Rosetti; maybe Hob. VIId:2?) (1784)

== For trumpet ==
- Trumpet Concerto in E♭, Hob. VIIe:1 (1796)

== For flute ==
- Flute Concerto in D, Hob. VIIf:1 (lost, 1780?)
- Flute Concerto in D, Hob. VIIf:D1 (ca. 1760, spurious, by Leopold Hoffman)

== For oboe ==
- Oboe Concerto in C major, Hob. VIIg:C1 (1790?) (doubtful, possibly by Ignaz Malzat)

== For 2 lire organizzate ==
These concertos were written for Ferdinand IV, King of Naples whose favorite instrument was the lira organizzata -- an instrument similar to the hurdy-gurdy. Many modern performances use flute and oboe (or two flutes) as the soloists, though there exist recordings that use the lire organizzate.

- Concerto No. 1 in C major, Hob. VIIh:1 (1786)
- Concerto No. 2 in G major, Hob. VIIh:2 (1786)
- Concerto No. 3 in G major, Hob. VIIh:3 (1786) "Romance" movement later adapted to become the "Military" movement of Symphony No. 100
- Concerto No. 4 in F major, Hob. VIIh:4 (1786)
- Concerto No. 5 in F major, Hob. VIIh:5 (1786) second and third movement later adapted to be part of Symphony No. 89

== For baryton ==
There are 3 concertos for baryton known but which have been lost or have doubtful authenticity.

- Concerto for baryton in D, Hob. XIII:1 (before 1770)
- Concerto for baryton in D, Hob. XIII:2 (before 1770)
- Concerto for 2 barytons in D, Hob. XIII:3 (before 1770)

== For harpsichord, organ or piano ==
- Keyboard Concerto No. 1 in C, Hob. XVIII:1 (1756)
- Keyboard Concerto No. 2 in D, Hob. XVIII:2 (1767)
- Keyboard Concerto No. 3 in F, Hob. XVIII:3 (1765)
- Keyboard Concerto No. 4 in G, Hob. XVIII:4 (1770)
- Keyboard Concerto No. 5 in C, Hob. XVIII:5 (uncertain authenticity, perhaps to be attributed to Georg Christoph Wagenseil, 1763)
- Keyboard and Violin Concerto No. 6 in F (Double Concerto), Hob. XVIII:6 (1766)
- Keyboard Concerto No. 7 in F, Hob. XVIII:7 (exists with a different slow movement as the piano trio Hob. XV:40; uncertain authenticity, perhaps to be attributed to Georg Christoph Wagenseil, 1766)
- Keyboard Concerto No. 8 in C, Hob. XVIII:8 (uncertain authenticity, perhaps to be attributed to Leopold Hofmann, 1766)
- Keyboard Concerto No. 9 in G, Hob. XVIII:9 (uncertain authenticity, 1767)
- Keyboard Concerto No. 10 in C, Hob. XVIII:10 (1771)
- Keyboard Concerto No. 11 in D, Hob. XVIII:11 (1782)
- Keyboard Concerto in E flat, Hob. XVIII:Es1 (doubtful authenticity)
- Keyboard Concerto in F, Hob. XVIII:F1 (spurious authenticity, written by Georg Joseph Vogler)
- Keyboard Concerto in F, Hob. XVIII:F2 (doubtful authenticity)
- Keyboard Concerto in F, Hob. XVIII:F3 (doubtful authenticity, perhaps to be attributed to Johann Georg Lang)
- Keyboard Concerto in G, Hob. XVIII:G1 (doubtful authenticity)
- Concerto for Two Keyboards in G, Hob. XVIII:G2 (doubtful authenticity)

On the above list, where as noted Nos. 5, 7, 8, 9 are doubtful, only Nos. 3, 4, and 11 are considered confirmed as genuine.

Two works often identified and even published as piano concertos by Haydn, and commonly taught to younger piano students, are actually Divertimenti, grouped in Hob. XIV. Specifically, they are Hob. XIV:3 (the "Little Concerto" in C major), and Hob. XIV:4 (another "concerto" in C major). However, another work of similar technical difficulty that is also identified and published as a concerto is the Concerto in F, Hob. XVIII:F1.

== See also ==
- List of compositions by Joseph Haydn
