= Symphony No. 4 (Michael Haydn) =

Portrait of Michael Haydn by Franz Xaver Hornöck

Michael Haydn's Symphony No. 4 in B♭ major, Perger 51, Sherman 4, MH 62, was written in Salzburg, completed on December 7, 1763. Charles H. Sherman's modern edition of this work has been published by Musikverlag Doblinger and also appears in an anthology from Garland Publishing that includes symphonies by Anton Cajetan Adlgasser and Johann Ernst Eberlin, two other Salzburg composers.

The work is scored for two oboes, two bassoons, two horns, and strings. It has three movements:

1. Allegro
2. Andante in E♭ major, called "La Confidenza"
3. Allegro molto

Charles Sherman finds the first movement "noteworthy for the length of its development section (nearly equal in number of measures to the exposition and to the recapitulation) and for the persistence with which it treats a motive derived" from the main theme. Another unusual feature of the first movement is that it ends piano, something rare even in the following century (for example, Beethoven's Eighth and Bruckner's Eighth).

Scholars are not sure why the second movement is called "La Confidenza" ("the secret communication"). It changes from a slow tempo and 3/4 time to a faster tempo in 2/4. The horns are dismissed for this slow movement, but the two bassoons stay and are given independent parts.

The last movement is a fast rondo in 3/8, which this symphony has in common with the others Haydn wrote at about the same time.

== Discography ==
As part of the Bournemouth Sinfonietta complete series of Haydn's symphonies conducted by Harold Farberman, an LP containing Symphony No. 13 (misidentified as Symphony No. 14) coupled with Haydn's Symphony No. 4 was released in 1984 on Vox Cum Laude – D-VCL 9086.
