= Johannes Spech =

Hungarian composer

Johannes (or János) Spech (10 December 1767 – 24 November 1836) was a Hungarian classical era composer.

He was born in Bratislava. Musicologist Dezsö Legány theorized that Spech must have been inspired to study music by the rich musical life of the city, where the opera theater regularly programmed works by Haydn, Mozart, and other acknowledged masters of the time. Spech received primary music education, but also studied law, and in 1792 he became a law clerk in Buda. A few years later he left for Vienna to study with Haydn. Researcher Tia DeNora notes that a discrepancy exists in biographical materials related to the next decades of Spech's life. Sources chosen for the New Grove dictionary suggest that Spech subsequently left for Hungary and worked as a civil servant intermittently for a number of years, while also being a theater conductor and pursuing a composer's career. However, Spech's great-grandson, when interviewed by the legendary scholar H. C. Robbins Landon, claimed that Spech followed his studies with Haydn by an extensive four-year course in the Paris Conservatory, after which he returned to Hungary and concentrated entirely on his musical career. He died in Oberlimbach (now Grad) after having lived some time in Vienna and Paris.

Spech's most numerous works are his settings of Hungarian songs, but his oeuvre also includes the following:

- opera Ines und Pedro, oder Die Johannisnacht (first performance 1814)
- opera Der Vogel des Bruder Philipp (first performance 1821)
- opera ("romantic fairytale") Felizie
- oratorio Die Befreiung von Jerusalem
- 7 cantatas
- 9 string quartets (3 published in Vienna as Opus 2 by 1803)
- 6 sonatas
- numerous settings of Hungarian songs (most published in Pest in 1805–23)

Dezsö Legány describes Spech's style as a mixture of influences: late Mozart, Schubert, contemporary French and Italian styles, and the rhythmic features of Hungarian music. Spech's works are rarely recorded. One of the few available records was made by the Festetics String Quartet for the Hungaroton label in the early 2000s.
