= 1776 in music =

Song celebrating the evacuation of the British from Boston, 1776

== Events ==
- Giovanni Paisiello is invited to the court of Catherine the Great, where he will stay for eight years.
- Court Theatre in Stockholm built by King Gustav III of Sweden

== Popular music ==
- Daniel Dow – "Money Musk"
- Psalms and Hymns for Public and Private Worship by Augustus Montague Toplady

== Opera ==
- Gaetano Marinelli – Il Barone di Sardafritta
- Giovanni Paisiello – Il finto spettro (December 26, Mannheim)
- Ignaz Pleyel – Die Fee Urgele
- Antonio Tozzi – Le Due Gemelli
- Tommaso Traetta – Germondo

== Classical music ==
- Carl Philipp Emanuel Bach
  - 6 Keyboard Trios, Wq.89
  - 3 Keyboard Trios, Wq.90
- Johann Christian Bach – Die Amerikanerin
- Luigi Boccherini – 6 String Quintets, G.277-282 (Op.13)
- Felice Giardini – String Quartet in E-flat major
- William Goodwin – Voluntary XII in D major
- François Joseph Gossec – Symphonie de chasse; Symphonie en ré
- Johann Wilhelm Hässler – 6 Keyboard Sonatas
- James Hook – The Ascension (oratorio)
- Wolfgang Amadeus Mozart
  - Piano Concerto No. 8 ("Lützow"), K.246
  - Haffner Serenade, K.250
- Joseph Haydn – Symphony No. 61, Hob.I:61
- Juliane Reichardt – An den Mond
- Antonio Salieri – La Passione di Nostro Signore Gesù Cristo für Soli, vierstimmigen Chor und Orchester
- Carl Stamitz – 6 Quartets, Op. 14
- Daniel Gottlob Türk – 6 Keyboard Sonatas, Sammlung 1
- Johann Adolph Hasse - Te Deum in G major

== Methods and theory writings ==
- Charles Burney – A General History of Music, vol. 1 (vol. 2 published 1782, vols. 3 and 4 in 1789)
- John Hawkins – A General History of the Science and Practice of Music

== Births ==
- January 24 – Ernst Theodor Amadeus Hoffmann, author and composer
- February 18 – John Parry, composer
- February 21 – Vincenzo Lavigna, composer
- March 31 – Joseph Küffner, composer (died 1856)
- April 8 – Thaddäus Weigl, composer
- April 27 – Hyacinthe Jadin, composer (died 1800)
- May 10 – George Thomas Smart, composer
- May 12 – Juan Bros y Bertomel, composer
- May 13 – Charles Ots and Rodrigo Ferreira da Costa, composers
- June 1 – John George Schetky, composer
- August 4 – Wenzel Sedlak, composer
- August 15 – Ignaz Xaver von Seyfried, composer
- August 16 – Philipp Jakob Riotte, composer
- August 19 – Johan Peter Strömberg, dancer and theatre director
- August 29 – Georg Friedrich Treitschke, librettist (died 1842)
- December 6 – Paul Friedrich Struck, composer

== Deaths ==
- February 13 – Luis Misón, composer, 50
- April 22 – Johann Adolph Scheibe, music theorist, 67
- May 6 – James Kent, composer, 76
- June 10 – Leopold Widhalm, luthier, 53
- November 29 – Zanetta Farussi, opera singer, 69
- date unknown
  - Thomas Capell, organist (date of birth unknown)
  - Josep Carcoler, composer, 78
  - Aaron Williams, composer, 45
