= Symphony No. 79 (Haydn) =

Symphony by Joseph Haydn

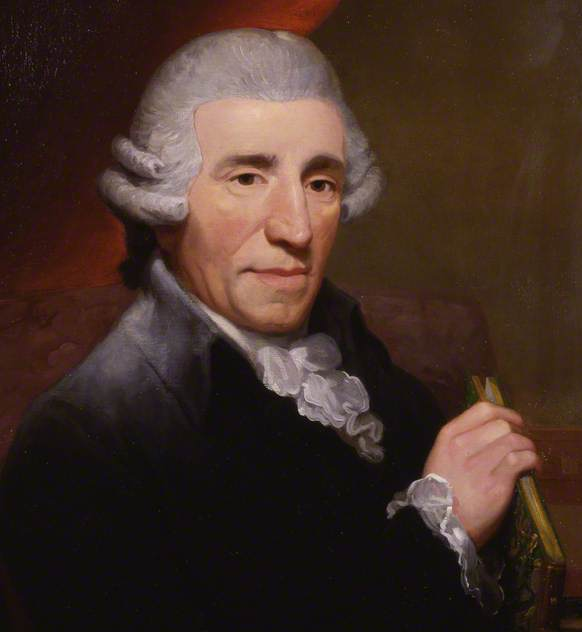
Portrait of Haydn by Thomas Hardy.

Haydn's Symphony No. 79 in F major, was composed in 1784. The symphony is characterized by a strong and joyful opening theme, as well as varied rhythms throughout all four movements, especially in the minuet. The wind section alternates throughout the symphony between doubling the string section and playing independently. Of particular note are a number of long rests, which are characteristic of Haydn.

== Symphonies No. 79–81 ==
Symphony No. 79 was composed as part of a trio of symphonies that also includes symphonies 80 and 81. Unlike the previous three symphonies that were composed for London or the next six that were composed for Paris, symphonies 79 through 81 were written for a Lenten concert performed in Vienna in March 1785.

For whatever purpose they were written, in these three symphonies Haydn experiments openly and widely with rhythms, pauses, tutti, minimal polyphony, occasional dissonance, theme and variations and dance-like structures. All three symphonies share the same structure of movements, and for the most part they have similar chord structures, at least in the first movements of each symphony.

== Music ==
The symphony is scored for flute, two oboes, two bassoons, two horns and strings.

There are four movements:

1. Allegro con spirito
2. Adagio cantabile, 3/4 — Un poco allegro, 2/2
3. Menuetto & Trio: Allegretto, 3/4
4. Finale: Vivace

The second half of the slow second movement is not slow at all and has a tempo more typical of a finale.

Much of the minuet is built on "4 + 2" six-bar phrases where the final two bars serve as a partial echo of the first four. The trio is based on a theme that is strikingly similar to the rondo finale to Mozart's first horn concerto, K. 412/386b, written in 1781/82.

The finale is a straightforward rondo with two episodes. The first episode has a gypsy flavor.
