= Symphony No. 81 (Haydn) =

Symphony by Joseph Haydn

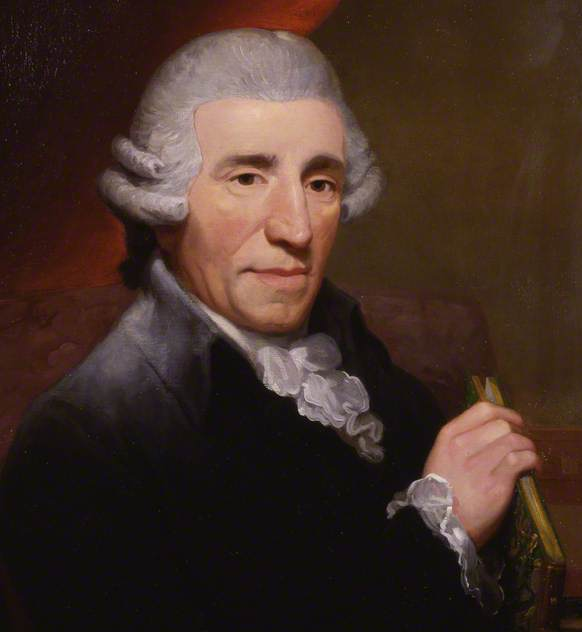
Portrait of Haydn by Thomas Hardy.

Symphony No. 81 in G major (Hoboken I/81) is a symphony by Joseph Haydn composed in 1784 as part of a trio of symphonies that also included symphonies 79 and 80. These three symphonies were specially written for performance in March 1785.

== Movements ==
The symphony is scored for flute, two oboes, two bassoons, two horns and strings.

It is composed of four movements:

1. Vivace
2. Andante, 6/8
3. Menuetto and trio: Allegretto, 3/4
4. Finale: Allegro ma non troppo, 2/2

In the first and third movements, Haydn explores "ambiguities of tonality ... which eventually reach their peak of subtlety" in the first movement of Symphony No. 94. The first movement begins "with an unusual and exciting pedal point ... [and] uses a subsidiary subject that appears like a cordial greeting to the newly won friend Mozart." The pedals and dissonances point to Mozart's K. 465.

The second movement is a siciliano theme with three variations. The variations are for the most part strophic and straightforward with the exception of a minor-key interlude in the center of the movement between the first and second variations. The final variation contains the fullest orchestration with pizzicato accompaniment and serves to recapitulate the movement.
