= Sinfonia Concertante (Haydn) =

Orchestral work by Joseph Haydn

- by Joseph Haydn
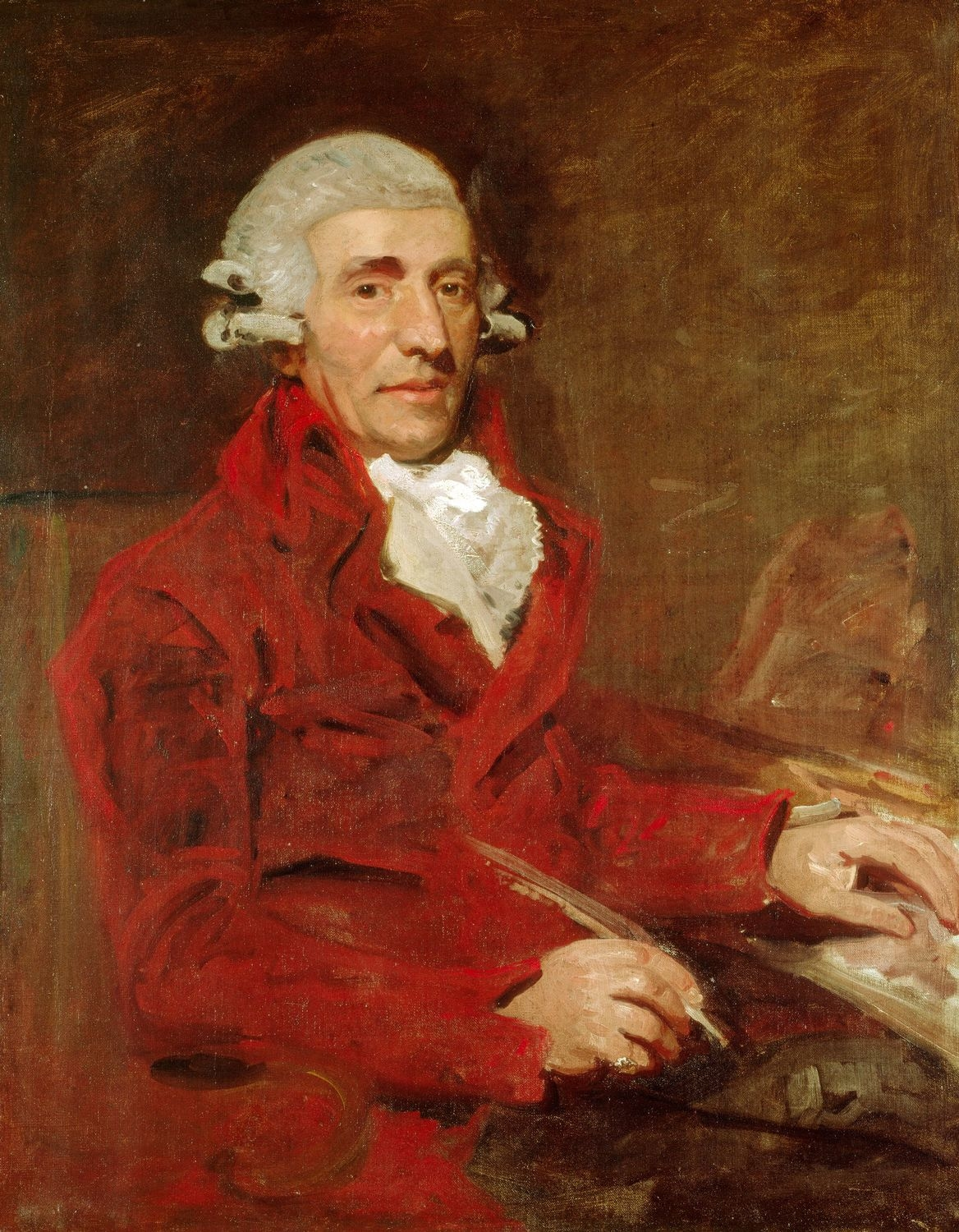
- Haydn, as portrayed by John Hoppner in England in 1791
- Key: B♭ major
- Catalogue: Hob. I:105
- Commissioned by: Johann Peter Salomon
- Composed: London, February–March 1792
- Duration: c. 20 minutes
- Movements: 3
- Scoring: Solo violin, solo cello, solo oboe, solo bassoon, orchestra

Premiere
- Date: 9 March 1792
- Location: London
- Performers: Johann Peter Salomon, Harrington, Holmes, Menel

The Sinfonia Concertante in B♭ major (Hob. I/105) by Joseph Haydn was composed in London between February and March 1792. It is believed to be a response to similar works composed by Ignaz Pleyel, a former student of Haydn's who London newspapers were promoting as a 'rival' to Haydn.

The work is a sinfonia concertante with four instruments in the solo group: violin, cello, oboe and bassoon. In addition to the solo group, the Sinfonia Concertante is scored for flute, two oboes, two bassoons, two horns, two trumpets, timpani, and strings.

== Background ==
The composition was written during the first of the composer's two visits to London. It is believed that Johann Peter Salomon asked Haydn to compose the work because of the success of similar works written by Pleyel and performed in a rival concert series.

Manuscript evidence indicates that the work was written in some haste and Haydn is known to have complained of eyestrain while working on it.

The first performance was given on 9 March 1792, with Salomon as lead violinist in the solo group. The other members of the solo group are only known by their surnames, Harrington (oboe), Holmes (bassoon) and Menel (cello). The performance was highly successful and not only was the work encored the following week, it was performed again during Haydn's 1794 visit to London with equal success.

Reviewing the first performance, The Monday Herald commented as follows: "The last performance at SALOMON'S Concert deserves to be mentioned as one of the richest treats which the resent season has afforded. A new concertante from HAYDN combined with all the excellencies of music; it was profound, airy, affecting, and original, and the performance was in unison with the merit of the composition. SALOMON particularly exerted himself on this occasion, in doing justice to the music of his friend HAYDN... The room had a very brilliant attendance."

The Oracle was also enthusiastic, giving the performance this notice: "Haydn directed for the first time the Performance of a New Concertante -- the third movement of which seemed expressly calculated to shew the brilliancy of SALOMON'S, and the sweetness of his tone. The prevailing manner of this Master pervaded every movement -- it had all his usual grandeur, contrasted by the levity of airy transition, and the sudden surprises of abrupt rests... The Company were very brilliant."

== Structure ==
The three movements are as follows.

1. Allegro
2. Andante in F major
3. Finale: Allegro con spiritoso

A typical performance will take roughly 20 minutes.
