= Symphony No. 15 (Michael Haydn) =

18th-century symphony by Michael Haydn

Portrait of Michael Haydn by Franz Xaver Hornöck

Michael Haydn's Symphony No. 15 in D major, Perger 41, Sherman 15, MH 150, is believed to have been written in Salzburg after 1771. The symphony was at one time attributed to Joseph Haydn, the first work in D major so attributed.

It is scored for flute, two oboes, two bassoons, two horns, and strings. It has four movements:

1. Allegro spiritoso
2. Minuet and Trio (in A major)
3. Andante (in G major)
4. Presto assai

The placement of the minuet second, before the slow movement, is unusual in Michael Haydn's symphonies, though there is one other specimen, the Symphony No. 16, which scholars are fairly certain is a close contemporary to this one. Three symphonies by Joseph Haydn also have this placement, 32, 37 and 44.

The corresponding placement of the scherzo second in the Romantic era, despite Beethoven's Ninth Symphony, remained rare until Bruckner's Second (original version), Eighth and Ninth symphonies, and Mahler's First, Fourth and Sixth (original version) symphonies.

== Discography ==
Included in a set of 20 symphonies on the CPO label with Bohdan Warchal conducting the Slovak Philharmonic. Also available on a Hungaroton CD of the Capella Savaria conducted by Pál Németh.
