= Symphony No. 5 (Haydn) =

Symphony in four movements by Joseph Haydn

Joseph Haydn

The Symphony No. 5 in A major, Hoboken I/5, by Joseph Haydn, is believed to have been written between 1760 and 1762, while he was employed either by Count Morzin or, Prince Paul II Anton Esterházy.

The symphony is scored for two oboes, bassoon, two horns, strings and continuo. A sonata da chiesa, it is in four movements:

1. Adagio ma non troppo, 2/4
2. Allegro, 3/4
3. Menuet and Trio, 3/4
4. Presto,

The opening slow movement and the trio in the third movement feature very high horn parts. Of Haydn's works, only those in the Sonata a tre, Hob. IV/5, and the 51st symphony are more difficult.
