= Symphony No. 80 (Haydn) =

Symphony in four movements by Joseph Haydn

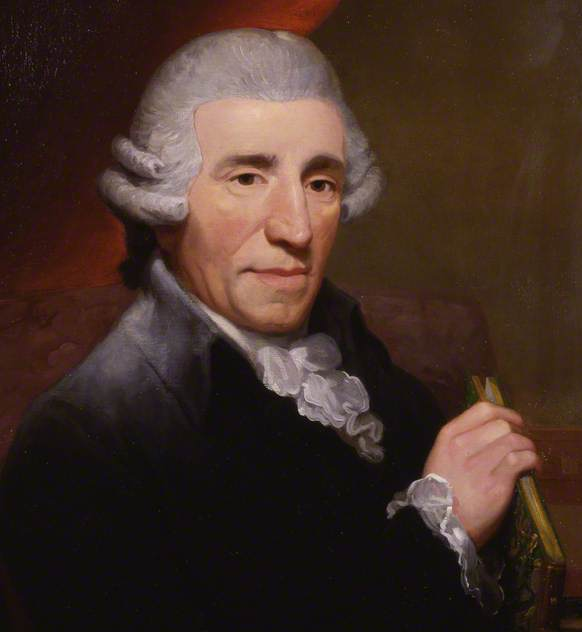
Portrait of Haydn by Thomas Hardy.

The Symphony No. 80 in D minor, Hoboken 1/80, is a symphony composed by Joseph Haydn in 1784 as part of a trio of symphonies that also included symphonies 79 and 81. This symphony, along with the one that follows it, and the one that precedes it, were not written for Prince Nikolaus, but for a Lenten concert performed in Vienna in March 1785.

It is one of the relatively few later symphonies by Haydn to begin in the minor mode. Symphony No. 80 is highly structured with both outer movements in sonata form. There is a common (though not strict) modulation pattern seen in all four movements.

== Music ==
The symphony is scored for flute, two oboes, two bassoons, two horns and strings

The work is in the typical four movements:

1. Allegro spiritoso
2. Adagio
3. Menuetto
4. Finale: Presto

The first movement opens with a theme in the cellos accompanied by tremolos in the strings evoking a strong sense of Sturm und Drang. After the second theme provides a brief respite in the relative major, the music becomes turbulent as it transitions again. What follows is a very striking expositional coda which is a light, dancing theme featuring Lombard rhythms and scored for solo flute and first violin against a pizzicato bass. The development begins with a quirky coda theme in the remote key of D♭ major and then slowly works it up the scale until it reaches A major followed by another grand pause and then the theme is repeated again in the relative major of F major. From there, Haydn blurs the lines between development and recapitulation as he did in earlier minor key symphonies. The first theme reappears in D minor, but it still appears to be part of the development. By the time the second theme appears in the parallel major of D major, it is evident that this is indeed the recapitulation and the movement drives home with odd expositional coda theme finishing the movement off in the appropriate key of D major. Haydn does not mark the second half of this movement with repeat signs.

The lyrical second movement is in B♭ major and has little trace of the storminess of the opening movement, although there are some darker passages toward the end of the movement.

The third movement returns to D minor with some emphasis on F major, like in the first movement. The trio is in D major and uses a derivative (almost the reverse) of the Gregorian incipit lamentatio melody previously used in his 26th symphony "Lamentatione".

The finale is a sonata form in D major, with both halves marked for repeat. There is a lot of syncopation throughout the movement, particularly amongst the strings where the first violins play an eighth-note ahead of the second violins and the rest of the orchestra. The last movement contains very little negative melodies and ends with a passage similar to that he used to end his Symphony No. 84 in E♭.
