= Symphony No. 33 (Haydn) =

Symphony in four movements by Joseph Haydn

Joseph Haydn

The Symphony No. 33 in C major (Hoboken I/33) is a festive symphony by Joseph Haydn. The precise date of composition is unknown. Haydn scholar H.C. Robbins Landon has dated this work to 1763–65. It has also been suggested that it was written in 1760 or 1761, along with Symphony no. 32.

== Music ==
The symphony is scored for two oboes, bassoon, two horns, two trumpets, timpani, strings, and continuo. Although Haydn's original timpani part has been lost, Robbins Landon has reconstructed it.

There are four movements:

1. Vivace, 3/4
2. Andante, 2/4 in C minor
3. Menuet e Trio (Trio in F major), 3/4
4. Finale: Allegro, 2/4

The symphony is unusual for its independent viola writing in the opening movement and its sparse harmonies in the second. This latter feature may have been to allow Haydn, who typically conducted his works from the keyboard, to improvise freely.
