= Symphony No. 12 (Mozart) =

1771 symphony by W. A. Mozart

- by W. A. Mozart
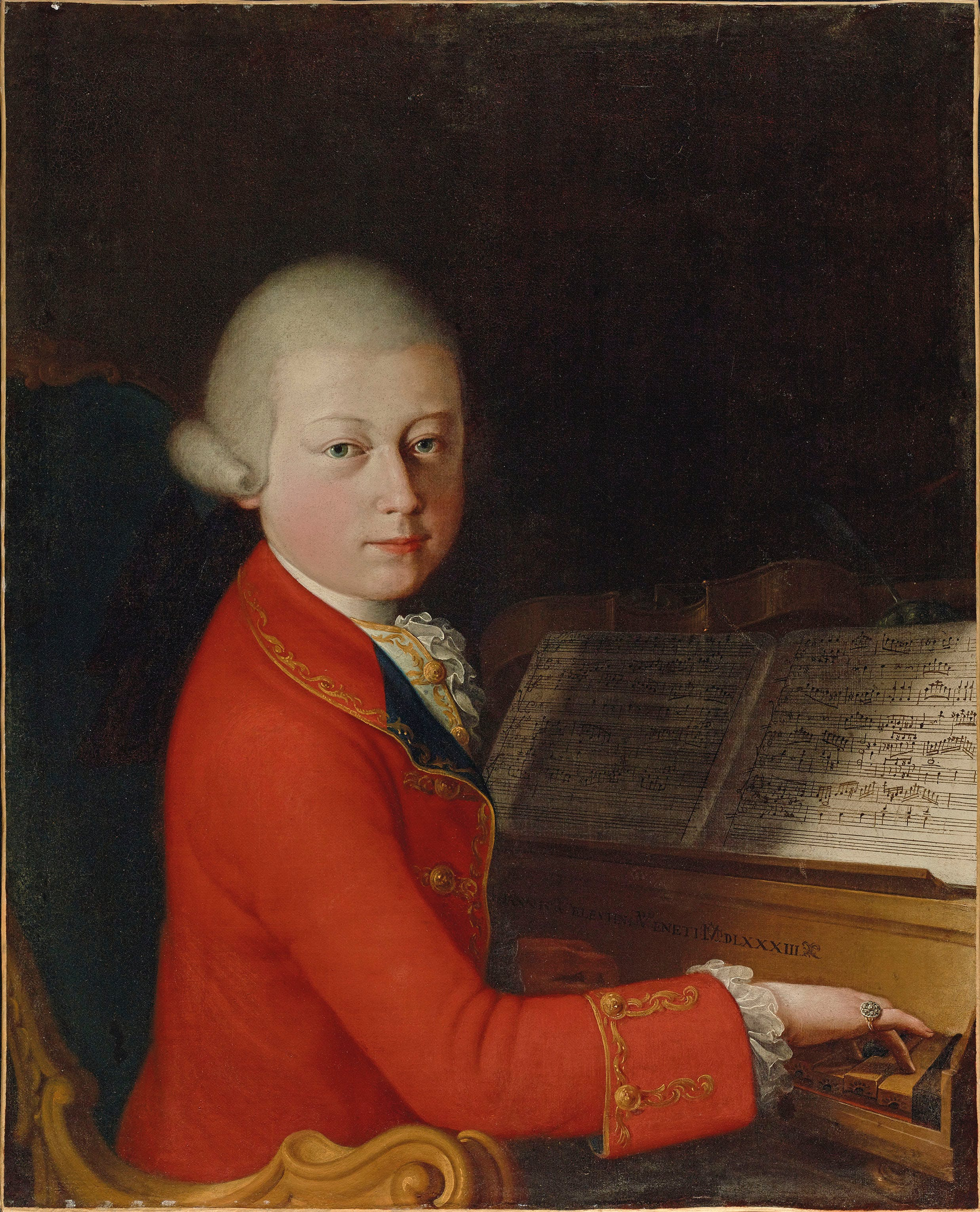
- 1770 Verona portrait of Mozart
- Key: G major
- Catalogue: K. 110/75b
- Composed: Salzburg, 1771
- Duration: c. 16 minutes
- Movements: 4
- Scoring: Orchestra with continuo

Symphony No. 12 in G major, K. 110/75b, by Wolfgang Amadeus Mozart, was composed in Salzburg in the summer of 1771 when he was fifteen. The symphony was apparently prepared in anticipation of Mozart's second Italian journey, which was to take place between August and December 1771.

== Music ==
The instrumentation is two flutes, two oboes, two bassoons, two horns in G, strings, and continuo.

The symphony is in four movements, the opening allegro being the longest movement that Mozart had written to that date. It is the first of a group of works "painted on a larger canvas and achieving a greater individuality than his earlier exuberant pieces".

1. Allegro, 3/4
2. Andante, 2/2 in C major
3. Menuetto and Trio, 3/4, Trio in E minor
  The minuet features a canon between high and low strings where the voices follow each other after a single bar. Joseph Haydn had used a similar device in the minuet of his 1764 Symphony No. 23, also in G major.
4. Allegro, 2/4

== Performance details ==
There are no confirmed details as to first performance. It is possible that this symphony was first played at a concert in Milan, on 22 or 23 November 1771. This concert may also have seen the premiere of Mozart's Symphony No. 13.
