= Symphony No. 89 (Haydn) =

Symphony by Joseph Haydn

The Symphony No. 89 in F major, Hoboken I/89, was written by Joseph Haydn in 1787, and performed under the auspices of Nikolaus Esterházy at Esterháza. It is sometimes referred to as The Letter W referring to an older method of cataloging Haydn's symphonic output.

The second and fourth movements of this symphony are based on movements of a Concerto for Lire Organizzata in F, Hob. VIIh/5, that Haydn composed in 1786, a year before this work, for Ferdinand IV, King of Naples. To accommodate other orchestras, Haydn had arranged all of his Lire Concertos to be played with flute and oboe as the solo instruments instead of the two lire.

== Music ==
The symphony is scored for flute, two oboes, two bassoons, two horns and strings.

It is in standard four-movement form:

1. Vivace,
2. Andante con moto in C major, 6/8
3. Minuet, 3/4
4. Vivace assai, 2/4

The first movement opens with five forte staccato chords followed by a flowing piano melody. The development section maintains the thematic order of the exposition, but develops the harmonic structure. Then in the recapitulation, the music stays in the tonic, but the themes themselves are developed. This has the effect of melodically interchanging the development and recapitulation sections while maintaining their harmonic roles. Haydn had previously used this effect in his 75th Symphony.

The second movement is a siciliano in 6/8 with a flowing theme. Because of the movement's origins as a Lire Concerto (which could only play in a few key signatures), this is one of Haydn's more straightforward siciliano movements.

The third movement is a minuet in which the winds have the predominant role. No other symphonic minuet begins with the wind band alone. The trio highlights the solo flute.

As noted above, the fourth movement is also derived from an earlier Lire Concerto. The ternary finale of the concerto is extended to a rondo (ABACA form) with an extended coda for the symphony. The new second episode is a contrapuntal F minor section which is quite turbulent and lends a symphonic weight to the movement that would be out of place in the earlier concerto. In the refrain, Haydn uses an unusual musical marking when the opening recurs in the second strain – strascinando – which instructs the performers to drag the beginning of this theme as it returns.
