= Symphony No. 13 (Michael Haydn) =

Michael Haydn's Symphony No. 13 in D major, Perger 37, Sherman 13, MH 132, believed to have been written in Salzburg in 1768, was at one time mistaken for a symphony by Joseph Haydn (Hob. I:D26). The symphony is scored for flute, two oboes, two bassoons, two horns, two trumpets, timpani, and strings.

It has four movements:

1. Allegro
2. Andante, in G major
3. Menuettos I & II
4. Allegro molto assai

It is unusual in that its third movement consist of two minuets.

== Discography ==
As part of the Bournemouth Sinfonietta complete series of Haydn's symphonies conducted by Harold Farberman, an LP containing Symphony No. 13 (misidentified as Symphony No. 14) coupled with Haydn's Symphony No. 4 was released in 1984 on Vox Cum Laude – D-VCL 9086.
