= Symphony No. 27 (Haydn) =

Symphony in three movements by Joseph Haydn

- Hermannstädter
- by Joseph Haydn
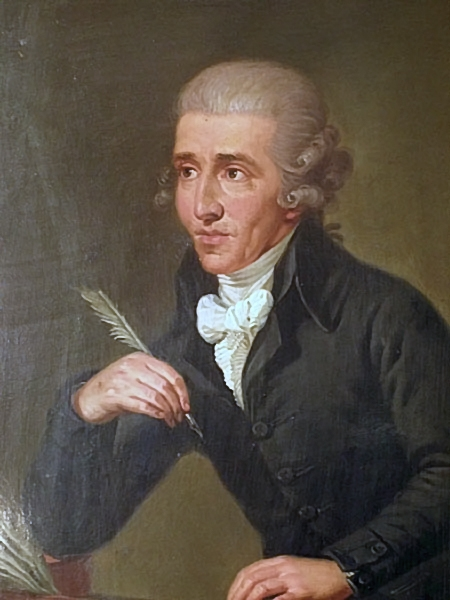
- Portrait of Joseph Haydn, ca. 1770
- Key: G major
- Catalogue: Hob. I:27
- Composed: 1761
- Movements: 3
- Scoring: Orchestra with continuo

Joseph Haydn's Symphony No. 27 in G major, Hob. I:27, was probably written before 19 March 1761, while he was employed by Count Morzin. Its chronological position was assigned by Eusebius Mandyczewski in 1907. Although later adopted by Hoboken, Robbins Landon has subsequently revised the work's likely chronological position and now believes that the symphony is one of Haydn's earliest, written at roughly the same time as symphonies nos. 15–18. Haydn himself may have labeled the symphony his 16th, although this remains unclear.

== Nickname (Hermannstädter) ==
In 1946, a copy of the symphony was discovered in the summer palace of Baron Samuel von Brukenthal near the city of Hermannstadt (now Sibiu, Romania). Originally thought to be an original discovery, the symphony briefly acquired the nickname Hermannstädter after it was recorded under that title by the Prague Symphony Orchestra with the Romanian conductor Constantin Silvestri. Because of the political climate in Eastern Europe following the Second World War, it was some time before musicologists were able to examine the find and realize that the manuscript was a copy of a work that had already been published by Breitkopf & Hartel in 1907.

== Music ==
Manuscript evidence suggests this work was originally scored for two oboes, two bassoons, strings, and continuo. Horns were subsequently added to the score, probably by Haydn himself.

The work is in three movements:

1. Allegro molto, 4/4
2. Andante, in C major 6/8 (Siciliano)
3. Presto, 3/8

Despite the small forces at Haydn's disposal, the symphonic expression is broad and vigorous. The main theme of the opening movement hints at the Mannheim Rocket, although in abbreviated fashion. The second hybrid subject employs a developmental device quite common in Haydn's early works. It starts in the dominant major but concludes in the dominant minor, setting up a bright contrast with the closing refrain of the exposition.

The second movement is a lilting 6/8 siciliano played on muted strings and without winds or horns. Robbins Landon describes the movement "as Italian an andante as was ever composed in Naples or Palermo".

The symphony concludes with a bright, upbeat and brief finale that, like many of his other early works, is developmentally straightforward.
