= Symphony No. 17 (Haydn) =

Symphony in three movements by Joseph Haydn

Joseph Haydn

Joseph Haydn's Symphony No. 17 in F major, Hoboken I/17, may have been written between 1757 and 1763.

It is scored for two oboes, bassoon, two horns, strings, and continuo. It is in three movements:

1. Allegro, 3/4
2. Andante, ma non troppo, F minor 2/4
3. Allegro molto, 3/8
