= Symphony No. 2 (Haydn) =

Symphony in three movements composed by Joseph Haydn

Joseph Haydn

Joseph Haydn's Symphony No. 2 in C major, Hoboken I/2, is believed to have been written between 1757 and 1761. The symphony is scored for two oboes, bassoon, two horns, strings, and continuo. Like many of the earliest symphonies by Haydn and others of the time, it is in three movements:

1. Allegro, 2/2
2. Andante in G major, 2/4
3. Presto, 3/8

In the second movement, the wind instruments are omitted and the violins play in semiquavers from start to finish (a kind of perpetuum mobile) with the pattern frequently broken by the use of trills. The violas in this slow movement double the bass part throughout at an octave above. (e.g., "col basso," which was common in the period). Also, the first and second violins are the same in the second movement. The last movement is "Haydn's first attempt at a symphonic rondo and is characterized by a preoccupation with imitative processes." It is the only one of Haydn's symphonies that contains no repeat signs. It is also one of his shortest symphonies; performances generally last less than ten minutes.
