= Symphony No. 72 (Haydn) =

Symphony in four movements by Joseph Haydn

Joseph Haydn in 1791

The Symphony No. 72 in D major (Hoboken 1/72) is a symphony by Joseph Haydn. The symphony was probably composed between 1763 and 1765. The date of this composition is earlier than its number suggests. This work is not well chronologically placed in the Hoboken numbering system: it was composed fifteen to twenty years before the neighboring works.

== Music ==
It is scored for flute, two oboes, bassoon, four horns and strings. It is one of the few classical-era symphonies to include four horns rather than two. This work is closely related to the Hornsignal Symphony because of its many soloistic horn passages and is also related to the "Day Trilogy" symphonies 6, 7 and 8 because of the concertante passages for other instruments.

The symphony is in four movements:

1. Allegro
2. Andante, 6/8
3. Menuet & Trio, 3/4
4. Finale: Andante (Thema. Var. I–VI), 2/4 — Presto, 6/8

The horns are silent in the second movement. In their place are solo passages for flute and violin.

The minuet begins and ends with the same phrase piano with the ending as an echo. The strings are silent in the trio which is scored for all the winds minus the flute.

The finale is a set of marching variations that features many soloists accompanied by strings. The first variation features solo flute, the second a solo cello, the third a solo violin and the fourth a solo violone. The fifth variation is scored for oboe, two horns and strings while the sixth variation is for flute, oboe, bassoon, four horns and strings. The movement concludes with a Presto coda in 6/8 and featuring a final horn flourish.
