= Symphony No. 10 (Haydn) =

Symphony in three movements by Joseph Haydn

Joseph Haydn

The Symphony No. 10 in D major, Hoboken I/10, is a symphony by Joseph Haydn. The symphony may have been written as early as 1757 but no later than 1761, probably for the small, but resourceful orchestra of Count Morzin.

It is scored for two oboes, bassoon, two horns, strings, and continuo. Like many of his early symphonies, the work is in three movements:

1. Allegro, 4/4
2. Andante, G major, 2/4
3. Presto, 3/8
