= Capella Savaria =

Hungarian music ensemble

The Capella Savaria is a Hungarian ensemble that perform chamber music on original instruments (and instruments based on original designs).

Established in 1981, in Szombathely, they most often perform music from the 17th and 18th centuries, and have performed around Europe, as well as making a number of recordings. In 1991, they received the Liszt Prize.

Their current artistic director is Zsolt Kalló.
