= Symphony No. 4 (Haydn) =

Symphony in three movements by Joseph Haydn

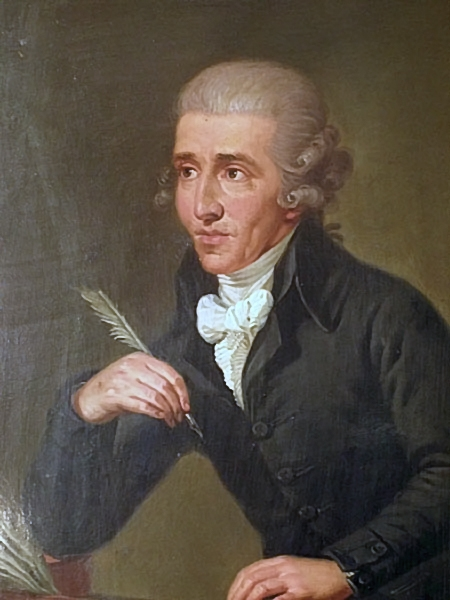
Portrait by Ludwig Guttenbrunn, painted c. 1791–92, depicting Joseph Haydn c. 1770

Joseph Haydn's Symphony No. 4 in D major, Hob. I/4, is one of the earliest symphonies he wrote, believed to have been composed roughly between 1757 and 1761. The work is scored for two oboes, bassoon, two horns, strings, and continuo. As usual for the period, it is in three movements:

1. Presto, 4/4
2. Andante in D minor, 2/4
3. Tempo di menuetto, 3/8

The second movement features a syncopated second violin part. The walking eighth-notes of the second violins are offset by half a step (a sixteenth note) from the first violins that play above it.

The finale is marked Tempo di menuetto, but is not in the 3/4 time of a minuet, but in the 3/8 time which is typical of Haydn's other early symphonic finales. Also, unlike other minuets, the movement lacks a central trio section.
