= Symphony No. 31 (Haydn) =

Symphony by Joseph Haydn

- Hornsignal
- by Joseph Haydn
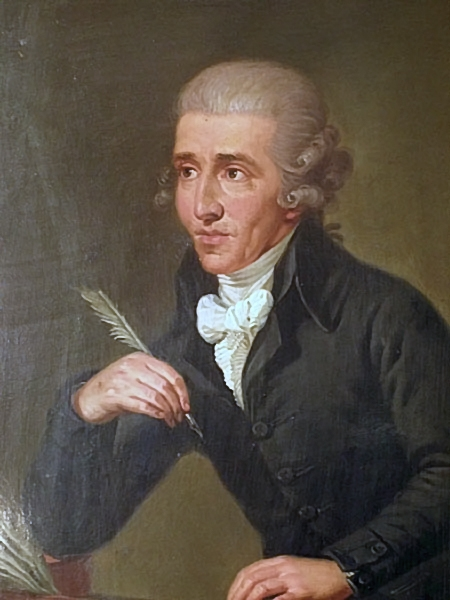
- Portrait of Joseph Haydn, ca. 1770
- Key: D major
- Catalogue: Hob. I:31
- Composed: 1771
- Dedication: Nikolaus I, Prince Esterházy
- Published: Paris, c. 1785
- Publisher: Jean-Georges Sieber
- Duration: c. 30-35 minutes
- Movements: Four
- Scoring: Orchestra

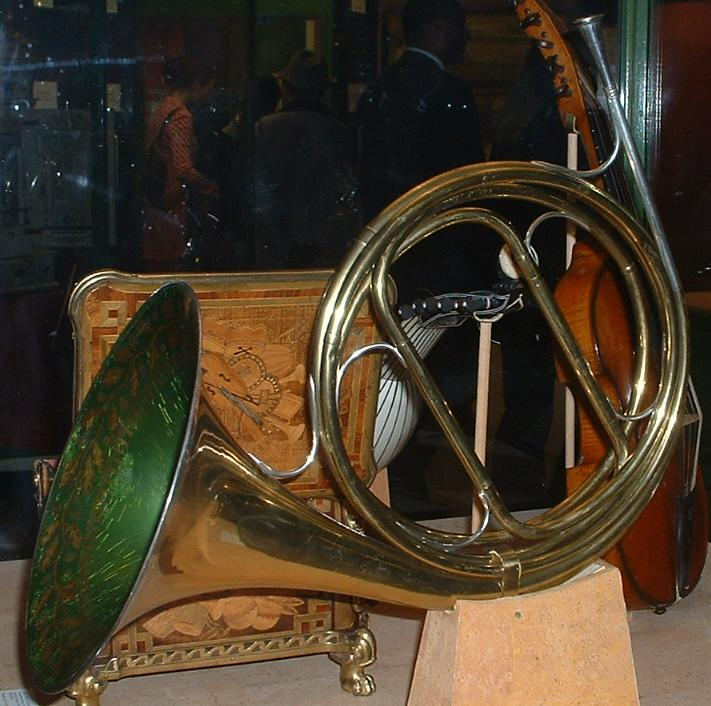
Valveless natural horn in the V&A Museum, London

Joseph Haydn's Symphony No. 31 in D major, Hob. I/31, was composed in 1765 for Haydn's employer Prince Nikolaus Esterházy. It is nicknamed the Hornsignal Symphony because it gives a prominent role to an unusually large horn section of four players. Probably because of its prominent obbligato writing for the horns, in Paris, the publisher Sieber published this symphony as a "symphonie concertante" around 1785.

== Background ==
The backdrop of this and other early Haydn symphonies was a patron who loved music and wanted his household music to be performed by top musicians – but whose budget did not accommodate anything like the orchestras of the size seen in modern times. Personnel fluctuated, and thus also the forces Haydn had available to work with. Haydn himself sought to retain the best instrumentalists, and he did so in part by writing interesting and challenging solos for them in his early symphonies.

Prince Nikolaus's orchestra had included a large horn section (four players) earlier in the 1760s, but one horn player, Franz Reiner, left in 1763 and was not replaced. A further loss is reported in a letter by Haydn dated 23 January 1765 (the earliest preserved letter of the composer). This informs the Prince of the death of a horn player named Knoblauch. Haydn suggested a replacement, but his suggestion was not accepted. The same letter serves as an illustration of Haydn's role as lobbyist for his men (see Papa Haydn): he requests that the Prince provide a fringe benefit for the musicians by covering the cost of their medications. This too was (temporarily) turned down.

Prince Nikolaus brought the horn section back to full strength in May 1765, when hornists Franz Stamitz and Joseph Dietzl were engaged to fill the missing places. The "Hornsignal" Symphony evidently was written to celebrate this event. (Other four-horn symphonies from roughly the same time are No. 13, No. 39, and the misnumbered No. 72.)

The exact date of the symphony is not known, other than the year. However, the symphony must have been premiered no earlier than May (since that is when Stamitz and Dietzl arrived) and before September 13, 1765. The latter date is known since the symphony includes a flute part, and the flautist (Franz Siegl) was dismissed on this date for having carelessly started a fire while shooting birds; it was only the following year that Haydn was able to persuade his patron to reinstate Siegl.

== Premiere ==
The premiere performance would have taken place in the hall of one of Prince Esterházy's palaces, probably in the family seat at Eisenstadt. The orchestra was very small, with perhaps three each for first and second violins, one violist, one cellist, and one bass player; but in compensation the hall would have been quite reverberant—the basis of a sonically impressive effect when the (not entirely refined, valveless) horns of the day were played in a group of four.

Haydn himself probably would have been one of the first violinists, leading the orchestra with his instrument. According to James Webster, "the audience would have consisted of the prince and his guests only and very often Haydn's orchestra of fifteen or so players would have outnumbered the listeners."

== Music ==
The work is scored for one flute, two oboes, four horns, and strings. David Wyn Jones remarks on these numbers: "given that the Esterházy orchestra as a whole was no more than 16 or 17 players, [four horns] amounted to a quarter of the orchestra, a proportion that not even Mahler or Strauss contemplated. (This deliberate imbalance of sonority is often regularized in modern performances by increasing the number of strings or by telling the horn players to play down.)"

The symphony is in four movements, marked as follows:

1. Allegro, 3/4
2. Adagio in G major, 6/8
3. Menuet – Trio, 3/4
4. Finale: Moderato molto, 2/4

It is the first movement that shows off the horn section most dramatically, although not with the hunting calls he would later be known for in The Seasons or his Symphony No. 73, La chasse. Here, Haydn begins with a military fanfare including all four horns:

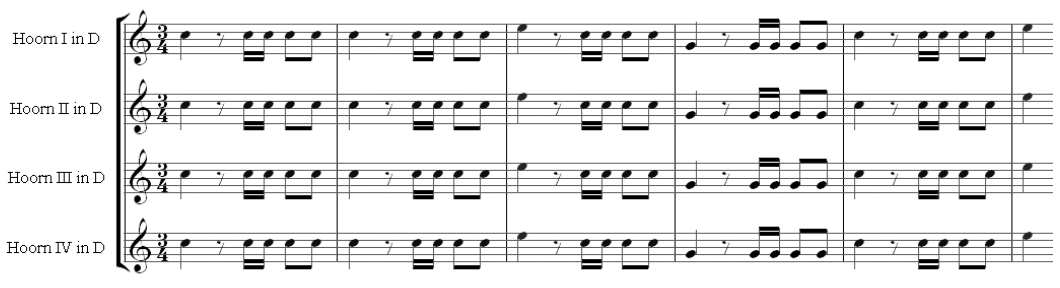

This is followed immediately by a solo horn playing a posthorn signal. The recapitulation at first omits the fanfare, beginning with posthorn signal, but the fanfare returns in the codas of both the first and last movements.

The slow movement has a siciliano rhythm and feel with solo passages for violin and cello against pizzicato bass accompaniment. Full orchestration (including all four horns) is retained for tutti passages, recalling the style of a concerto grosso.

The finale is a theme with seven variations. The variations here and in No. 72 are the first to appear in the Haydn symphonies. Most of the variations are written to show off a particular instrument or section of the orchestra, in the following order: oboes, cello, flute, horns, solo violin, tutti (all players), and double bass. There is a final coda, marked Presto, whose final notes repeat the horn fanfare of the opening movement of the symphony.

== Reception ==
Webster calls the symphony "a splendidly ostentatious work, displaying the prowess of the horn players to maximum effect in all four movements."

== Notes ==
=== Sources ===
- Jones, David Wyn (2009) "Horn family". In David Wyn Jones, ed., Oxford Composer Companions: Haydn. Oxford: Oxford University Press.
- Landon, H. C. Robbins and David Wyn Jones (1988) Haydn: His Life and Music, Thames and Hudson.
- Webster, James (1990) Program notes to volume 4 of Christopher Hogwood's recordings of the Haydn symphonies. Oiseau-Lyre 430 082-2.
