= Symphony No. 61 (Haydn) =

Symphony by Joseph Haydn

Joseph Haydn

The Symphony No. 61 in D major, Hoboken I/61, is a symphony by Joseph Haydn. The autograph has survived and is dated 1776.

== Music ==
The symphony is scored for flute, two oboes, two bassoons, two French horns, timpani, and strings.

There are four movements:

1. Vivace
2. Adagio, 3/4 in A major
3. Menuetto & Trio: Allegretto, 3/4
4. Finale: Prestissimo

The opening movement is colorfully orchestrated. Particularly notable is the second theme which starts with pulsating oboes and bassoon before the flute enters with a falling motif. The expositional coda also features a pulsating accompaniment against a chromatic rise in the strings.

Daniel Heartz has noted the "hunt"-like character of the final movement, and Haydn's greater mastery of rondo form compared to earlier symphonies.
