= Symphony No. 18 (Haydn) =

Symphony in three movements by Joseph Haydn

Joseph Haydn

The Symphony No. 18 in G major, Hoboken I/18, is a symphony by Joseph Haydn. The composition date is conspicuously uncertain. The Breitkopf catalogue entry assures that it was composed no later than March 1766, the date of the Esterhazy orchestra moving to Esterhaza, but most scholars believe it was composed at least a few years before then. Dates between 1757 and 1764 have been also suggested but not proven.

== Music ==
The symphony is scored for two oboes, bassoon, two horns, strings, and continuo.

Although the symphony is in three movements, it has been sometimes categorized as in the sonata da chiesa style due to the presence of an entire opening slow movement. The three movements are:

1. Andante moderato, 2/4
2. Allegro molto, 4/4
3. Tempo di Minuetto, 3/4, G major – G minor – G major

The opening movement is written in the form of a trio sonata with two melodic lines over an independent bass.
