= Symphony No. 20 (Haydn) =

Symphony in four movements by Joseph Haydn

Joseph Haydn

The Symphony No. 20 in C major (Hoboken I/20) is a festive symphony by Joseph Haydn. Hodgson places the composition date in either 1761 or 1762 while Brown states that it was likely composed before 1761. Calvin Stapert affirmatively states that it was composed in the group of 15 symphonies within Haydn's tenure with Count Morzin (1757 – March 1761), and that it is festive, like C major Symphonies 32, 33, and 37.

The symphony is scored for two oboes, bassoon, two horns, two trumpets, timpani, strings, and continuo.

It is in four movements:

1. Allegro molto, 2/4
2. Andante cantabile, 2/2 in G major
3. Minuetto (C major) & Trio, F major 3/4
4. Presto, 3/8

The winds are silent in the serenade-like second movement with the melody in the first violins, broken chords in the second violins and a pizzicato bassline.
