= Symphony No. 16 (Haydn) =

Symphony in three movements by Joseph Haydn

Joseph Haydn

Joseph Haydn's Symphony No. 16 in B♭ major, Hoboken I/16, may have been written between 1757 and 1761.

It is scored for two oboes, bassoon, two horns, strings, and continuo, with a solo cello part in the slow movement. It is in three movements:

1. Allegro, 3/4
2. Andante in E♭ major, 2/4
3. Allegro or Presto, 6/8

The slow movement features a solo cello doubled in octaves with muted violins.
