= Symphony, K. 196+121 (Mozart) =

1774/75 symphony by W. A. Mozart

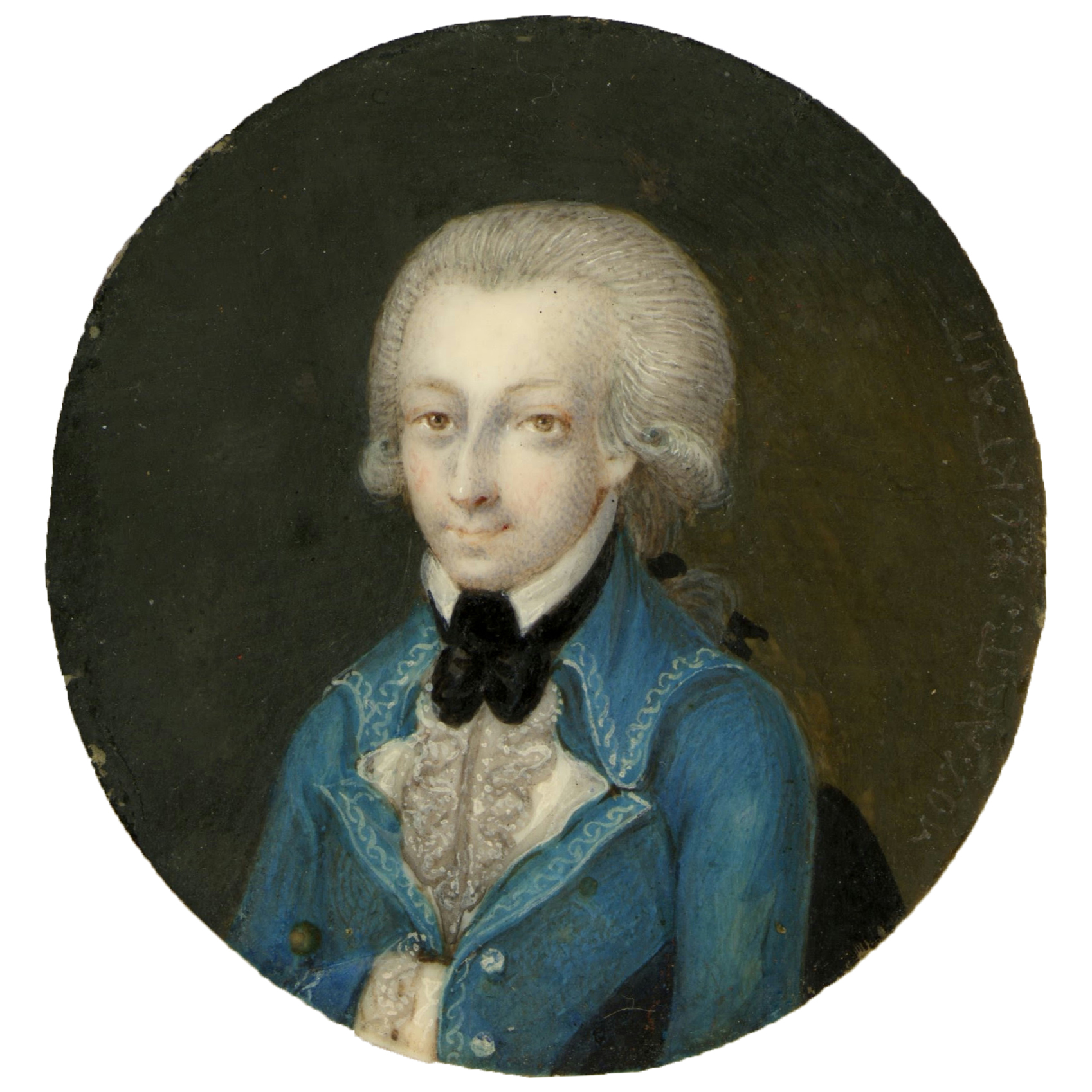
1773 miniature of Mozart

The Symphony in D major "No. 51", K. 196+121 (207^{a}, was composed by Wolfgang Amadeus Mozart in 1774–1775. The first two movements originated from the overture to the opera La finta giardiniera, K. 196, and the last movement, K. 121/207^{a}, was composed separately in 1775. (The dating of the last movement was questioned by Alan Tyson as the paper used was purchased by Mozart in Milan in late 1772 and used until early 1773, but Mozart apparently took some of this paper back to Salzburg and used it in 1776.)

The Alte Mozart-Ausgabe (published 1879–1882) gives the numbering sequence 1–41 for the 41 numbered symphonies. The unnumbered symphonies (some, including K. 121/207a, were published in supplements to the Alte-Mozart Ausgabe until 1910) are sometimes given numbers in the range 42 to 56, even though they were written earlier than Mozart's Symphony No. 41 (written in 1788). The symphony K. 196+121 is given the number 51 in this numbering scheme.

== Music ==
The symphony is scored for two oboes, two horns in D, and strings. The oboes and horns are silent for the second movement.

The symphony consists of the following movements:

1. Allegro molto, 4/4
2. Andantino grazioso, 2/4, A major
3. Allegro, 3/8
