= Symphony B (Haydn) =

Symphony by Joseph Haydn

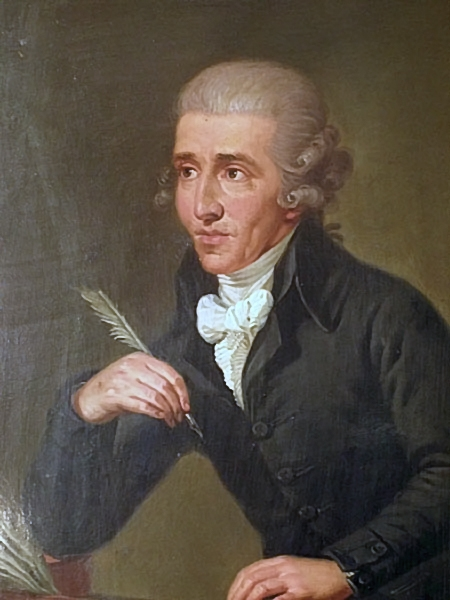
Portrait by Ludwig Guttenbrunn, painted c. 1791–92, of Joseph Haydn c. 1770

Joseph Haydn's Symphony B in B♭ major, Hoboken I/108, was written between 1757 and 1760, and was one of his earliest symphonies. It does not fall into the usual numbering scheme of Haydn's symphonies because it had later been published without its wind parts as a "Partita". It is scored for two oboes, bassoon, two horns, strings, and continuo.

The work has four movements:

1. Allegro molto, 4/4
2. Menuetto & Trio (Trio in E♭ major). Allegretto, 3/4
3. Andante in G minor
4. Presto

The trio of the minuet contains a dialogue between solo viola and solo bassoon.
