= Symphony No. 19 (Haydn) =

Symphony in three movements by Joseph Haydn

Joseph Haydn

The Symphony No. 19 in D major, Hoboken I/19, is a symphony by Joseph Haydn. The symphony was composed between 1757 and 1761.

It is scored for two oboes, bassoon, two horns, strings, and continuo.

The symphony is homotonal and in three movements:

1. Allegro molto, 3/4
2. Andante, D minor, 2/4
3. Presto, 3/8
