= Symphony No. 51 (Haydn) =

Symphony in four movements by Joseph Haydn

Joseph Haydn

The Symphony No. 51 in B♭ major, Hoboken I/51, is a symphony by Joseph Haydn, written in either 1773 or 1774, although the exact dating remains ambiguous.

Scored for two oboes, two horns (B♭ alto, E♭), bassoon, and strings, the symphony is in four movements:

1. Vivace, 3/4
2. Adagio
3. Menuetto – Trio I – Trio II, 3/4
4. Allegro

Sometimes described as "a concertante piece featuring the two horns, which are given parts of staggering difficulty." The second, slow, movement contains high notes for the first horn (including a written F_{6} for horn in E♭) and very low notes for the second horn. The third movement contains an even higher note for horn, a written C_{6} for horn in B♭ alto (sounding as B♭_{5}), one of the highest notes ever written for horn. Heartz has noted the character of the fourth movement as reminiscent of the French rondeau. The first contrasting section is an oboe solo in E♭ major and the second contrasting section is fortissimo and in G minor.
