= Symphony No. 1 (Haydn) =

Symphony by Joseph Haydn

Joseph Haydn

Joseph Haydn's Symphony No. 1 in D major, Hoboken I/1, was written in 1759 in Unter-Lukawitz, while in the service of Count Morzin. (Note: H. C. Robbins Landon, "not sure if it is actually the first he composed, or even the first that survived to posterity.") While it is reliably known that No. 1 was written in 1759, H. C. Robbins Landon cannot rule out that No. 2, No. 4, or both could have been composed in 1757 or 1758, which would make this either Haydn's second or third symphony, rather than his first.

Symphony No. 1 is scored for two oboes (or possibly flute), bassoon, two horns, strings, and continuo. Like most of the early symphonies by Haydn and his contemporaries, it is in three movements:

1. Presto, 4/4
2. Andante in G major, 2/4
3. Presto, 3/8

The first movement opens with a Mannheim crescendo which is in contrast to the rest of the symphony, which is more Austrian in character.

The first movement has "frequent passages", where the violas are "used with some ingenuity and quite separately from the bass line."
