= Symphony No. 35 (Haydn) =

Symphony in four movements by Joseph Haydn

Joseph Haydn

Symphony No. 35 in B♭ major, Hoboken I/35, was written by Joseph Haydn. The autograph score is "carefully" dated "December 10, 1767". It has been speculated that this symphony was written to celebrate Prince Esterházy's return from a visit to the Palace of Versailles.

== Music ==
The symphony is scored for two oboes, bassoon, two French horns, strings and continuo. The "horns are given parts of terrifying difficulty."

It is in four movements:

1. Allegro, 3/4
2. Andante in E♭ major, 2/4
3. Menuet – Trio, 3/4
4. Presto, 2/4

The first movement's theme "suddenly develops a towering contrapuntal anger in the development" and is primarily in minor keys.

The winds are dismissed for the slow movement.

The minuet features some colorful passages for the horn while the contrasting Trio is more subdued and scored for four-part strings.

The finale plays games with three hammerstrokes (tonic–dominant–tonic) which begin the exposition and are worked extensively in the development. The three chords also serve as the movement's final cadence, confusing listeners into thinking that more will follow. This ambiguity is enhanced if the second part of the movement is repeated.
