= Symphony No. 32 (Haydn) =

Symphony in four movements by Joseph Haydn

Joseph Haydn

The Symphony No. 32 in C major (Hoboken I/32) is a festive symphony by Joseph Haydn. The exact date of composition is unknown. It has been suggested by noted Haydn scholar H.C. Robbins Landon that it could have been written as early as 1757 and as late as 1763. More recent scholars have suggested it was composed in either 1760 or 1761.

== Music ==
The symphony is scored for two oboes, bassoon, two horns, two trumpets, timpani, strings, and continuo.

The work is in four movements:

1. Allegro molto, 2/4
2. Menuet in C major and Trio in C minor, 3/4
3. Adagio ma non troppo, 2/4 F major
4. Finale: Presto, 3/8

The work is one of the few symphonies of the Classical era to place the Minuet second (others include Haydn's 37th and 44th, and his brother Michael's 15th and 16th). The winds are dismissed for the slow movement. The 3/8 time signature for the finale is consistent with an early date of its composition.
