= Symphony No. 44 (Haydn) =

Musical work by Joseph Haydn, composed in 1792

- Trauer
- by Joseph Haydn
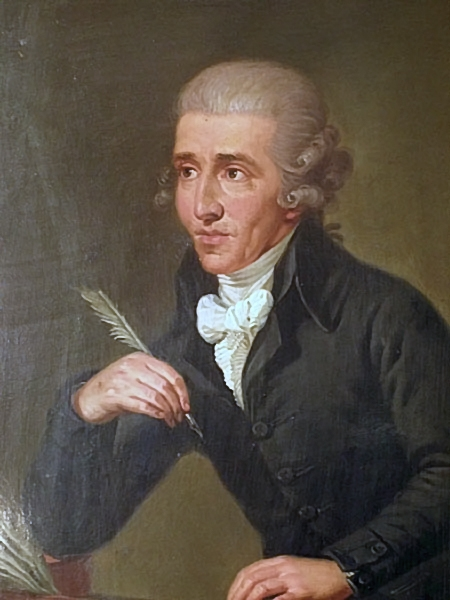
- Portrait of Joseph Haydn, ca. 1770
- Key: E minor
- Catalogue: Hob. I:44
- Composed: 1772
- Duration: About 25 minutes
- Movements: 4
- Scoring: Orchestra

Joseph Haydn's Symphony No. 44 in E minor, Hob. I:44, was completed in 1772. It is popularly known as Trauer (English: Mourning).

The nickname originates from an apocryphal story relating that Haydn asked for the slow movement of this symphony to be played at his funeral.

== Music ==
The symphony is scored for two oboes, bassoon, two horns (in E and G), strings, and basso continuo.

It is in four movements:

1. Allegro con brio, 4/4
2. Menuetto e Trio: Allegretto, 3/4, trio in E major
3. Adagio, 2/4 in E major
4. Finale: Presto, 2/2

The piece is typical of Haydn's Sturm und Drang (storm and stress) period. The first movement, which is in sonata form, begins with a four-note motif played in unison which occurs throughout the movement. After a brief period of E minor, the second subject, in G major, in its fullest form, appears abruptly. The development section develops both themes, especially the first half of the second theme. The development of the second theme becomes unstoppable and hyperactive and eventually climaxes before modulating back to E minor for the recapitulation. The first subject gets its repeat in the tonic in its fullest form. The second theme, this time in the tonic, only gets the second half of itself repeated, because the first half was widely used in the development section, as it is written above. Instead, there is a brief episode in the middle, which helps the second theme's length to stay the same as the exposition.

The second movement, unusually, is a minuet in E minor and trio in E major; thus the work is one of the few symphonies of the Classical era to place the Minuet second (others include Haydn's 32nd and 37th, and his brother Michael's 15th and 16th). The minuet is in the form of a "Canone in Diapason" between the upper and lower strings with the lower strings trailing the upper strings by a single bar. Haydn would later use a similar double canon with the lower strings trailing the upper strings by one measure in the famous "Witches Minuet" of his D minor quartet from Op. 76.

The third movement is slow, also in E major, and with strings muted. The finale, like the first movement, is in sonata form and is dominated by a figure which opens the movement in unison. It is quite contrapuntal, and ends in E minor rather than finishing in a major key as was usual in most other minor key works of the time.

Since all of the movements have the same tonic, the work is homotonal.

== See also ==
- List of symphonies by name
