= Ludwig Guttenbrunn =

Austrian artist

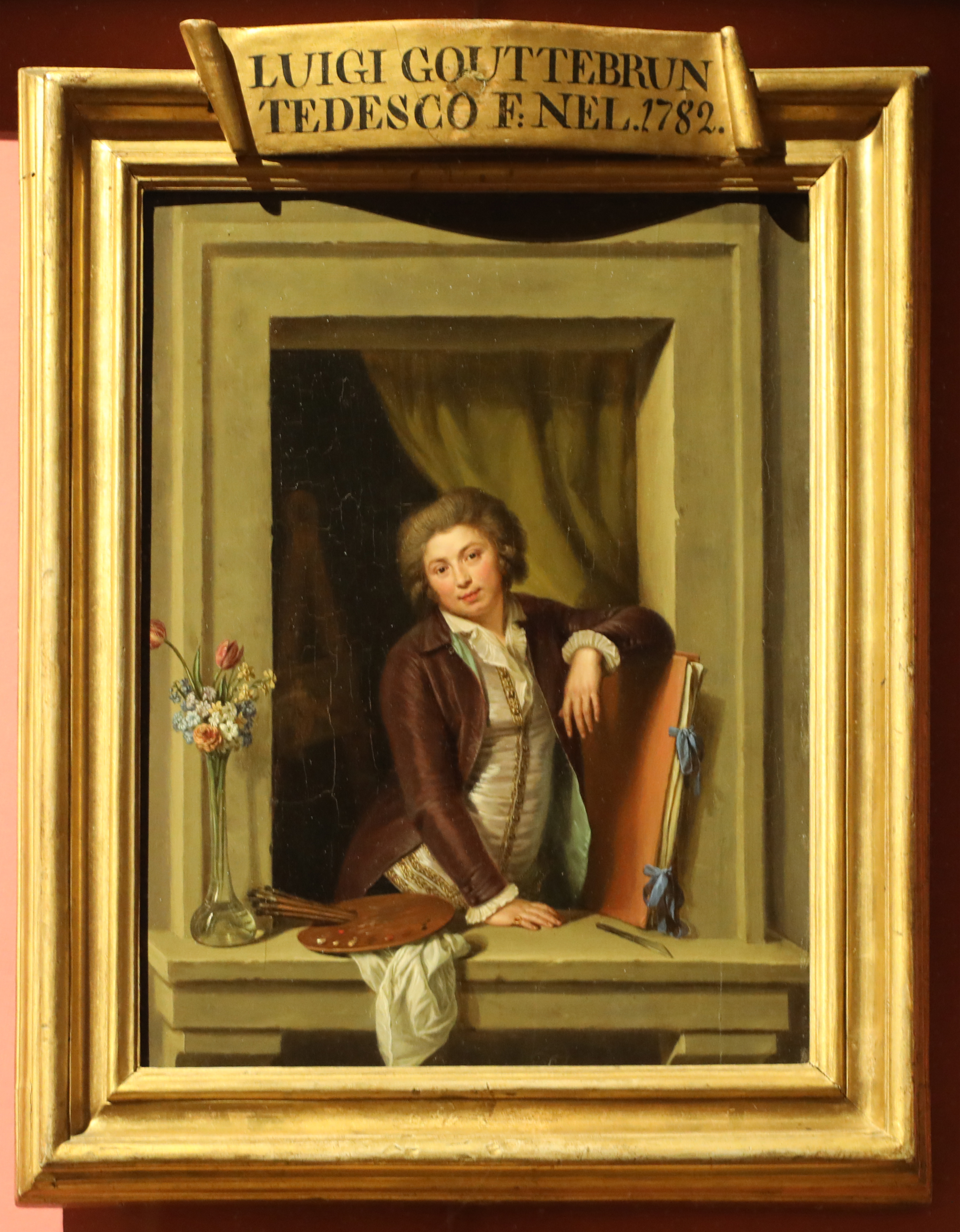
Selfportrait, Florenz, Uffizien (1782)

Ludwig Guttenbrunn (1750 – 15 January 1819) was an artist who worked in the latter part of the 18th century and early 19th century. He was born in the Holy Roman Empire and died in the Austrian Empire. He specialized in portraiture and history painting.

== Life ==
Guttenbrunn was born either in Vienna, or in Krems. He studied painting under Martin Johann Schmidt. By 1770 he was working for the Esterházy family, where he painted portraits of the reigning prince, Nikolaus Esterházy, and possibly the portrait of Joseph Haydn seen and discussed below. He also created decorative paintings for Nikolaus's new palace at Esterháza.

By 1772 he had moved to Rome, where he had been sent to study by Prince Esterházy (he did not return to the Esterházy court, however). He continued to work as a portrait painter, later moving to Florence. He executed a self-portrait which hangs in the Uffizi Gallery in Florence.

In 1789 he moved to London. Shortly after arrival, or perhaps on the way, he produced the portrait of Marie Antoinette, Queen of France, shown below. According to Robbins Landon, Guttenbrunn was successful in London, and his "name is encountered frequently in the newspapers". Robbins Landon quotes an advertisement from the Morning Herald, 24 April 1794, which reads:

[Guttenbrunn's] Exhibition of Ancient and Modern Pictures, No. 4 Little Maddx-street four doors down from New Bond-street, is now open every day ... [Among the portraits is that of] the late Queen of France taken from life in the year 1789.

(The Queen had been guillotined by the revolutionary government the previous year.)

In 1795, on the recommendation of the Russian envoy in London, he moved to St. Peterburg, then later to Moscow. His portrait of Alexej Kurakin, shown below, dates from his stay in Russia.

He is known to have been in Dresden in 1806, then after 1807 back in Rome. Guttenbrunn's last attested painting dates from 1813.

== Death ==
He died in Frankfurt am Main, 15 January 1819.

== Guttenbrunn's portrait of Joseph Haydn ==
Guttenbrunn's portrait of Haydn, seen below, exists in two versions. It is possible that the first dates from his encounter with Haydn at the Esterházy court in the early 1770s, and the second from their encounter in London in the early 1790s. The second version is more detailed than the first, and was the basis for an engraving (1792) by Luigi Schiavonetti.

The portrait shows Haydn in the act of composing: he is seated at a keyboard, gazing into the distance, testing out notes with one hand and putting pen to paper with the other.

== Gallery ==
These images may be viewed in larger size by clicking on them.

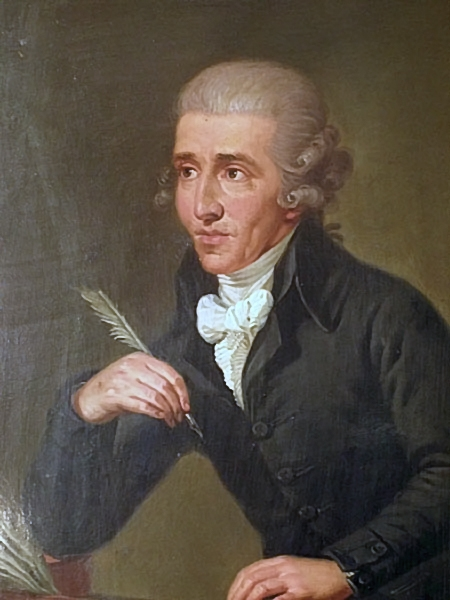
Detail of Guttenbrunn's portrait of Joseph Haydn. For the uncertain date, see discussion above.

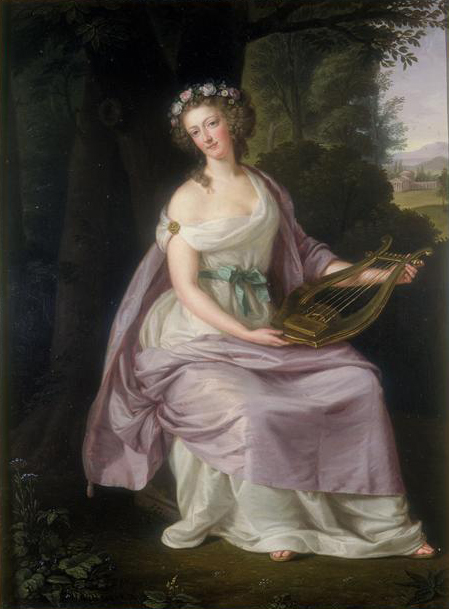
Queen Marie Antoinette, portrayed as the muse Erato. From 1789. Currently held by the Fondazione Coronini Cronberg, Gorizia, Italy.

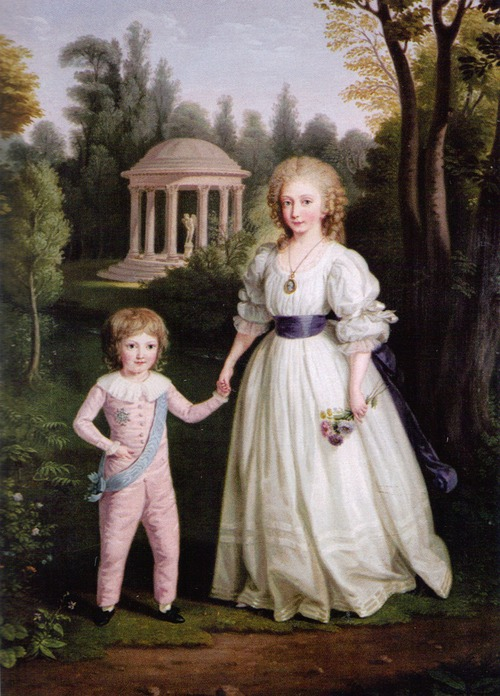
Two of Marie Antoinette's children: Marie Therese and Louis Charles

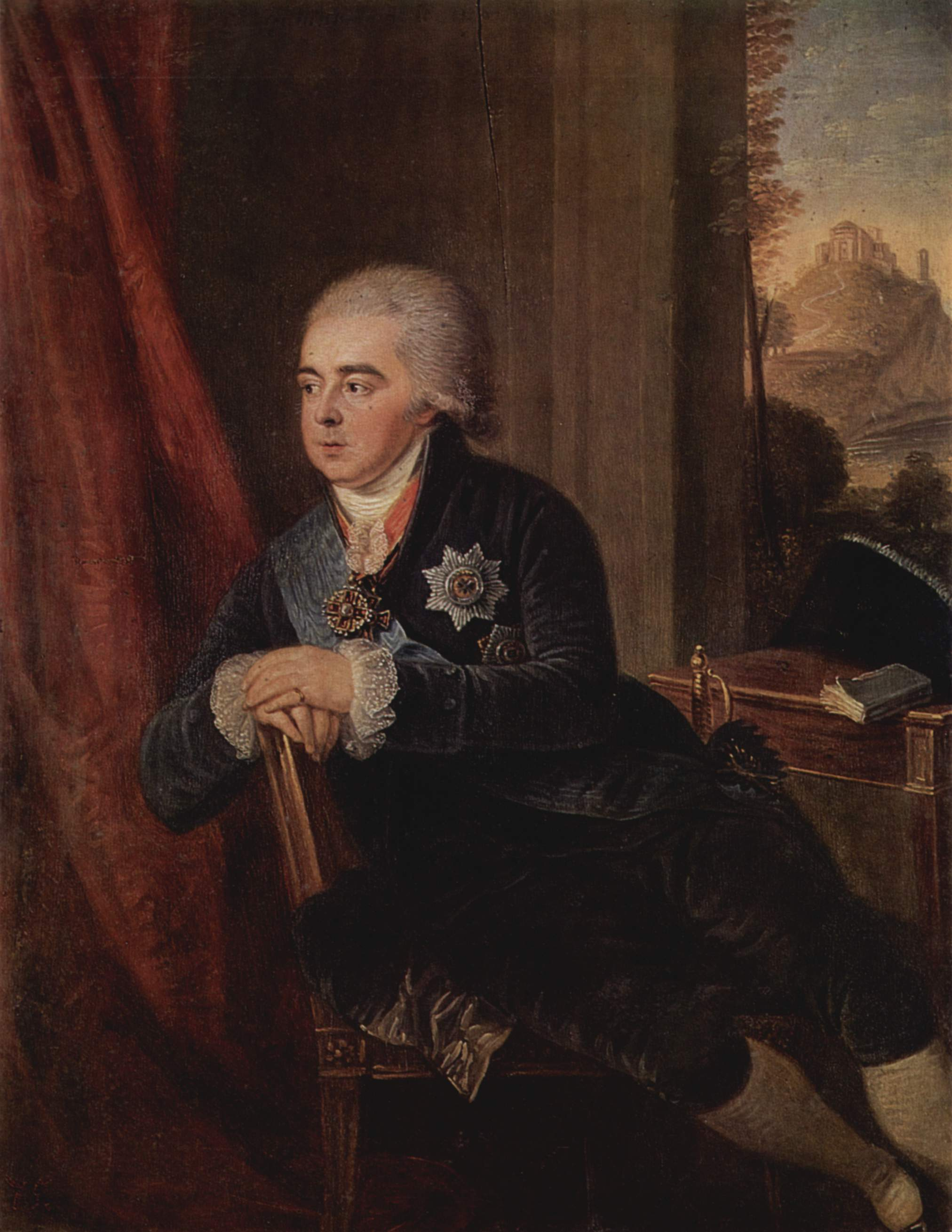
1801 portrait of Prince Alexej Kurakin, governor of Ukraine. Oil on wood. Hermitage Museum, St. Petersburg.

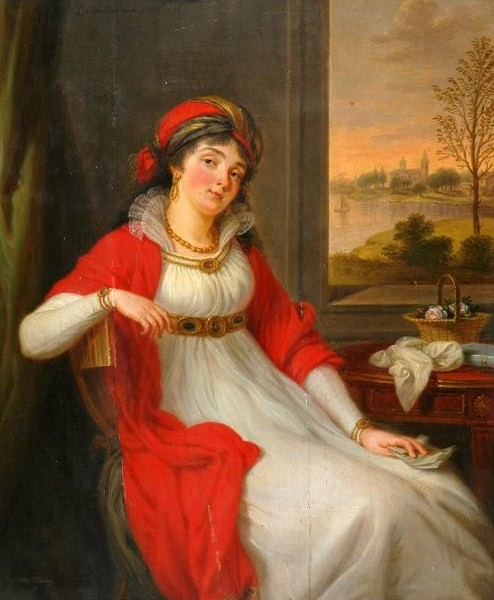
Duchess Anna Alexandrovna de Serra Capriola, 1796

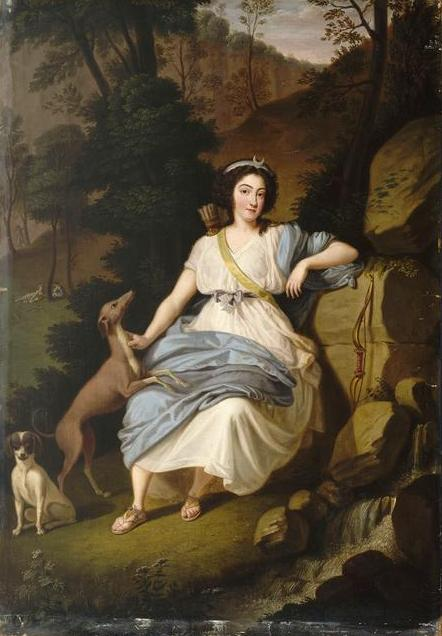
The Countess of Provence as Diane, circa 1775

The family of Antonio Greppi, 1780
