= Homotonal =

Technical musical term

Homotonal (same-tonality) is a technical musical term that describes the tonal structure of multi-movement compositions. It was introduced into musicology by Hans Keller. According to Keller's definition and usage, a multi-movement composition is 'homotonal' if all of its movements have the same tonic (keynote).

'Homotonality' is common in compositions of the Baroque era: many Baroque multi-movement works based on dance-forms manifest the same tonic—and even the same mode (major or minor) – throughout. Thus, for example, J.S. Bach's solo violin partita BWV 1004 is homotonal [all movements in D minor], as is his solo flute partita BWV 1013 [all movements in A minor]. Similarly, Vivaldi's sonata for oboe and continuo RV53 (n.d.) is homotonal [all movements in C minor]. Homotonality is even encountered in some Baroque concertos: examples include Vivaldi's Cello Concertos RV401 (n.d.) [all movements in C minor] and RV416 (n.d.) [all movements in G minor], as well as the second concerto of his most famous work The Four Seasons ("Summer" RV315) (1725) [all movements also in G minor], and Jean-Marie Leclair's Violin Concerto Op.7 No 1 (1737) [all movements in D minor].

With the Classical era, however, the situation changes. Outside of two-movement works (which, classically speaking, will maintain the same tonic for both movements and will thus be homotonal by definition), classical-era homotonality is relatively rare: a classical work in three movements will normally move to a different tonic for its middle movement, and a classical work in four movements will normally have at least one of its middle movements in a key other than the original tonic.

The classical composer most closely associated with the homotonal principle is Joseph Haydn.

Keller himself was keen to emphasise that different classical composers showed differing degrees of interest in homotonal structure:

Although Mozart, as opposed to Haydn, tended to work within narrow tonal frameworks, he did not carry the homotonal approach very far into his maturity . . . whereas Haydn did: some of the older master's greatest string quartets adhere to a single tonality"

"[U]nlike the mature Haydn, Mozart never came to write four movements without changing the keynote" [not actually true, but indeed it was much rarer for Mozart than Haydn once Mozart reached maturity]

Just because Haydn is more adventurous in his excursions into remote keys than Mozart, he sometimes needs a rigid tonal framework in order to contain them; unlike Mozart and like Haydn, whose developmental modulatory creative character he produced twinlike, Beethoven in his turn was to indulge in passionate tonal and harmonic contrast within homotonal frameworks.

Keller's coinage and concept have not become standard among musicologists. Musicologist William Drabkin, for example, asked the question "doesn't 'homotonality' sound a trifle queer?"

The term 'homotonality' (referring to the manifest retention of a tonic) should not be confused with 'monotonality' (the theoretical position according to which a tonal structure has only one 'real' tonic, and all modulation is superficial or illusory).

== Examples ==
Examples of 'homotonal' works (in more than two movements) from the classical era and afterwards are:

=== 1750s ===
- The Toy Symphony [all movements in G major]
- Haydn's Symphony No. 37 (c. 1758) [all movements in C major or C minor]

=== 1760s ===
- Haydn's Symphony No. 4 (1757–60) [all movements in D major or D minor]
- Haydn's Symphony No. 19 (1757–61) [all movements in D major or D minor]
- Haydn's Symphony No. 17 (1760–61) [all movements in F major or F minor]
- Haydn's Piano Trio Hob. XV/1 (1761) [all movements in G minor]
- Haydn's Symphony No. 25 (1761–63) [all movements in C major]
- Haydn's Symphony No. 12 (1763) [all movements in E major or E minor]
- Haydn's Symphony No. 33 (1763–65) [all movements in C major or C minor]
- Haydn's Symphony No. 21 (1764) [all movements in A major]
- Haydn's Symphony No. 22 'The Philosopher' (1764) [all movements in E♭ major]
- Haydn's Symphony No. 34 (1765) [all movements in D minor or D major]
- The Symphony, K. Anh. C 11.18 'Odense' (attributed spuriously to Mozart, 1765?) [all movements in A minor or A major]
- Mozart's Sonata in C major for keyboard four-hands, K. 19d (perhaps spurious, 1765?) [all movements in C major]
- Haydn's Piano Trio Hob. XV/37 (1766) [all movements in F major]
- Haydn's Piano Trio Hob. XV/38 (1766) [all movements in B♭ major]
- Haydn's Piano Trio Hob. XV/C1 (1766) [all movements in C major]
- Haydn's Piano Trio Hob. XIV/6 (1767) [all movements in G major or G minor]
- Haydn's Symphony No. 49 'La Passione' (1768) [all movements in F minor]
- Haydn's Symphony No. 59 'Fire' (c. 1768) [all movements in A major or A minor]

=== 1770s ===
- Mozart's string quartet K. 80 (1770) [all movements in G major]
- Haydn's String Quartet Op.17 No. 1 (1771) [all movements in E major or E minor]
- Haydn's String Quartet Op.17 No. 5 (1771) [all movements in G major or G minor]
- Mozart's Symphony K. 96 "No. 46" (1771) [all movements in C major or C minor]
- Haydn's Symphony No. 52 (1771–72) [all movements in C minor or C major]
- Haydn's string quartet Op.20 No. 2 (1772) [all movements in C major or C minor]
- Haydn's String Quartet Op.20 No. 3 (1772) [all movements in G major or G minor]
- Haydn's String Quartet Op.20 No. 4 (1772) [all movements in D major or D minor]
- Haydn's String Quartet Op.20 No. 5 (1772) [all movements in F minor or F major]
- Haydn's Symphony No. 44 'Trauer' (1772) [all movements in E minor or E major]
- Haydn's Symphony No. 46 (1772) [all movements in B major or B minor]
- Mozart's string quartet K. 157 (1772) [all movements in C major or C minor]
- Haydn's Piano Sonata Hob.XVI:23 (1773) [all movements in F major or F minor]
- Mozart's string quartet K. 168 (1773) [all movements in F major or F minor]
- Mozart's string quartet K. 173 (1773) [all movements in D minor or D major]
- Mozart's Piano Sonata K.280 (1774) [all movements in F major or F minor]
- Mozart's Symphony K. 208+102 "No. 52" (1775) [all movements in C major]
- Haydn's Piano Sonata Hob.XVI:27 (1776) [all movements G major]
- Mozart's 'Serenata Notturna' K. 239 (1776) [all movements in D major]
- Mozart's Notturno for 4 Orchestras K. 286 (1777) [all movements in D major]
- Mozart's Piano Sonata K. 331 (1778) [all movements in A major or A minor]
- The Sinfonia Concertante for Oboe, Clarinet, Horn, Bassoon and Orchestra K. 297b/Anh.C 14.01 (attributed spuriously to Mozart, 1778?) [all movements in E♭ major]
- Haydn's Symphony No. 70 (1779) [all movements in D major or D minor]
- Michael Haydn's Symphony No. 23 (c. 1779) [all movements in D major or D minor]
- Mozart's Symphony No. 32 (1779) [all movements in G major]

=== 1780s ===
- Haydn's Symphony No. 63 'La Roxelane' (1779–81) [all movements in C major or C minor]
- Haydn's Piano Sonata Hob.XVI:37 (1780) [all movements in D major or D minor]
- Haydn's Symphony No. 62 (1780–81) [all movements in D major]
- Haydn's String Quartet Op.33 No.5 (1781) [all movements in G major or G minor]
- Haydn's String Quartet Op.33 No.6 (1781) [all movements in D major or D minor]
- Mozart's Serenade for winds K.375 (1781) [all movements in E♭ major]
- Haydn's Piano Trio Hob. XV:5 (1785) [all movements in G major]
- Haydn's Piano Trio Hob. XV:7 (1785) [all movements in D major or D minor]
- Haydn's Piano Trio Hob. XV:10 (1785) [all movements in F major]
- Hoffmeister's Viola Concerto No. 1 (1786) [all movements in D major or D minor]
- Haydn's String Quartet Op.50 No.6 (1787) [all movements in D major or D minor]
- Haydn's String Quartet Op.54 No.2 (1788) [all movements in C major or C minor]
- Haydn's String Quartet Op.55 No.2 (1788) [all movements in F minor or F major]
- Mozart's Violin Sonata K.547 (1788) [all movements in F major]

=== 1790s ===
- Haydn's String Quartet Op.64 No.2 (1790) [all movements in B minor or B major]
- Haydn's Piano Trio no. 37 in A major, Hob. XV:18 (1793) [all movements in A major or A minor]
- Dussek's Piano Concerto No. 5, Op. 22 (1793) [all movements in B♭ major]
- Haydn's Piano Trio no. 38 in D major, Hob. XV:24 (1795) [all movements in D major or D minor]
- Haydn's Piano Trio no. 40 in F♯ minor, Hob. XV:26 (1795) [all movements in F♯ minor or F♯ major]
- Beethoven's Piano sonata Op.2 No.1 (1795) [all movements in F minor or F major] (dedicated to Haydn)
- Haydn's Piano Trio No. 44, Hob. XV:28 (1797) [all movements in E major or E minor]
- Haydn's String quartet Op.76 No.2 (1797) [all movements in D minor or D major]
- Beethoven's Piano sonata Op.10 No.2 (1796–98) [all movements in F major or F minor]
- Beethoven's Piano sonata Op.10 No.3 (1796–98) [all movements in D major or D minor]
- Beethoven's Violin Sonata No. 2, Op.12 No.2 (1797–8) [all movements in A major or A minor]
- Haydn's String Duo, Hob. VI:Anh. 1 (1798) [all movements in B♭ major]
- Haydn's String Duo, Hob. VI:Anh. 2 (1798) [all movements in E♭ major]
- Beethoven's String Trio No. 4 (1798) [all movements in D major or D minor]
- Beethoven's Piano sonata Op.14 No.1 (1798–99) [all movements in E major or E minor]
- Beethoven's Violin Sonata No. 4 Op. 23 (1800) [all movements in A minor or A major]

=== After 1800 ===
- Beethoven's Piano Sonata Op.26 (1800–01) [all movements in A♭ major or A♭ minor]
- Beethoven's String Quartet Op.18 No.4 (1801) [all movements in C minor or C major]
- Beethoven's Piano Sonata Quasi una fantasia Op.27 No.2 ('Moonlight Sonata') (1801) [all movements in C♯ minor or D♭ major]
- Beethoven's Piano Sonata Op.28 (1801) [all movements in D major or D minor]
- Clementi's Piano Sonata Op.40 No.2 (1801–02) [all movements in B minor]
- Clementi's Piano Sonata Op.40 No.3 (1802) [all movements in D major or D minor]
- Beethoven's String Quartet Op.59 No.2 (1806) [all movements in E minor or E major, although the finale deceptively begins in C major]
- Beethoven's Piano Trio Op.70 No.1 ('Ghost') (1808) [all movements in D major or D minor]
- Beethoven's Piano Sonata Op.79 (1809) [all movements in G major or G minor]
- Schubert's String Quartet D.87 (1813) [all movements in E♭ major]
- Paganini's Violin Concerto in E minor (ca. 1815) [all movements in E minor / major]
- Schubert's Piano Sonata No.7 in D♭ (D.567/568) (1st version, 1817) [all movements in D♭ major or C♯ minor]
- Beethoven's Piano Sonata Op. 109 (1820) [all movements in E major or E minor]
- Clementi's Piano Sonata Op. 50 No.3 'Didone Abbandonata' (1821) [all movements in G minor]
- Mendelssohn's Viola Sonata in C minor MWV Q 14 (1824) [all movements in C minor]
- Chopin's Piano Concerto No. 1 Op. 11 (1830) [all movements in E minor or E major]
- Friedrich Kalkbrenner's Piano Concerto No. 4 in A♭ major, Op. 147 (1835) [all movements in A♭ major or A♭ minor]
- Alkan's Piano Trio No. 1 in G minor, Op. 30 (published 1841) [all movements in G minor or G major]
- Mendelssohn's Organ Sonata Op.65 No.2 (1844) [all movements in C minor or C major]
- Mendelssohn's Organ Sonata Op. 65 No.6 (1845) [all movements in D major or D minor]
- Schumann's Symphony No. 2 Op. 61 (1845–46) [all movements in C major or C minor]
- Brahms' Piano Trio No. 1 Op. 8 (1853-4; rev. 1889) [all movements in B major or B minor]
- Smetana's Piano Trio Op. 15 (1854–5) [all movements in G minor]
- Brahms' Piano Concerto No. 1 Op.15 (1854–9) [all movements in D minor or D major]
- Brahms' Horn Trio Op. 40 (1865) [all movements in E♭ major or E♭ minor]
- Brahms' String Quartet No. 2 Op. 51 No. 2 (1873) [all movements in A minor or a major]
- Dvořák's String Quartet No. 5 Op. 9 (1873) [all movements in F minor or F major]
- Grieg's Holberg Suite Op. 40 (1884) [all movements in G major or G minor]
- Brahms' Piano Trio No. 3 Op. 101 (1886) [all movements in C minor or C major]
- Christian Sinding's Suite im alten Stil Op. 10 (1888) [all movements in A minor]
- Dvořák's Sonatina for Violin and Piano Op. 100 (1893) [all movements in G major or G minor]
- Brahms' Clarinet Sonata Op. 120 No. 2 (1894) [all movements in E♭ major or E♭ minor]
- Scriabin's Piano Concerto Op. 20 (1896) [all movements in F♯ minor or F♯ major]
- Zemlinsky's String Quartet No. 1, Op. 4 (1896) [all movements in A major or A minor]
- Roffredo Caetani's Piano Quintet Op. 4 (1897) [all movements in F♯ minor]
- Satie's Jack in the Box (1899) [all movements in C major]

=== After 1900 ===
- Arne Oldberg's Piano Sonata No. 2 in B♭ minor (1909) [all movements in B♭ minor or B♭ major]
- Debussy's Cello Sonata (1915) [all movements in D minor]
- Debussy's Sonata for flute, viola and harp (1915) [all movements in F major or F minor]
- Debussy's Violin Sonata (1916–17) [all movements in G minor or G major]
- Britten's Sinfonia da Requiem, Op. 20 (1940) [all movements in D major or D minor]
- Britten's String Quartet No. 2, Op. 36 (1945) [all movements in C major or C minor]
- Miriam Hyde's Trio for Flute, Clarinet and Piano (1948) [all movements in G major or G minor]
- Miriam Hyde's Clarinet Sonata (1949) [all movements in F minor or F major]
- Mikhail Goldstein's Symphony in G minor, attributed to Mykola Ovsianiko-Kulikovsky as his "Symphony No. 21" (1948) [all movements in G minor or G major]
- Nikolay Myaskovsky's String Quartet No. 13, Op. 86 (1949) [all movements in A minor or A major]

=== After 2000 ===
- Christopher Norton's Clarinet Sonata (2012) [all movements in C major]
