= Symphony No. 34 (Haydn) =

Symphony in four movements by Joseph Haydn

Joseph Haydn

The Symphony No. 34 in D minor (Hoboken I/34) was written by Joseph Haydn. According to traditional chronology it was written in 1765, shortly before Haydn's Sturm und Drang period began in 1766, during his social withdrawal at Esterháza. However, more recent chronologies place it two years earlier, in 1763, which if correct would suggest that it is the first minor-key symphony Haydn ever wrote, though there is some uncertainty around chronology, with Symphony No. 26 being the traditional candidate (and the lowest numbered minor symphony) and Symphony No. 39 another candidate.

== Theatrical origins ==
It is possible that this symphony is the one referred to in an inscription accompanying Haydn's Symphony No. 49 which reads: questa Sinfonia (i.e. 49) serve di Compagna a quella / del Philosopho Inglese dell' istesso autore. (This symphony serves as a companion to the "English Philosopher" by the same author.)

The English Philosopher or II filosofo inglese, was a play written in 1754 by Carlo Goldoni. It was performed at Vienna's Karntnerthortheater in December 1764 in German translation under the title Die Philosophinnen, oder Hannswurst, der Cavalier in London zu seinen Unglücke, and featured two mock-Quakers as characters. The provenance of Symphony no. 49 is likely also to have originated as a theatrical piece for a German translation of Nicolas Chamfort's popular play La jeune indienne which also featured overly solemn Quakers for comedic purposes.

This symphony is the only one that shares exactly the same movement plan as Symphony No. 49, namely an extended sonata-form opening Adagio in 3/4 time; an Allegro di molto with a wide-leap principal theme; a Minuet and a Presto finale. The symphony is homotonal (i.e. all movements are in the same tonic), following the custom associated with the sonata di chiesa. The thematic similarity in musical style combined with the conjuncture of character portrayals in both Chamfort's and Goldoni's works suggests a deliberate use of musical themes to portray theatrical elements common to both. Further, the jig motif of the finale was associated with an English style.

== Music ==
The scoring of the symphony is typical of Haydn in this period: two oboes, bassoon, two horns, strings, and continuo.

The four movements follow the what was by then archaic sonata da chiesa pattern: slow-quick-slow (minuet)-quick.

1. Adagio, 3/4
2. Allegro, 4/4
3. Menuet – Trio, 3/4
4. Presto assai, 2/4

Only the slow first movement – which is almost as long as the other three movements combined – is in D minor, the rest of the symphony is in sunny D major. Because of this, the piece is sometimes denoted with two key signatures (i.e. D minor/D major). Since all of the movements have the same tonic, the work is homotonal.
