= Symphony No. 70 (Haydn) =

Symphony by Joseph Haydn

Joseph Haydn

The Symphony No. 70 in D major, Hob.I:70, was written by Joseph Haydn to mark the start of construction of a new opera house on the Eszterháza estate. It was premiered on December 18, 1779—one of the few Haydn symphonies whose exact date of the premiere is known.

== Music ==
The symphony is scored for flute, two oboes, bassoon, two horns, two trumpets, timpani and strings. The first draft had neither trumpet nor timpani parts; Haydn added those later.

The work is in standard four-movement form:

1. Vivace con brio, 3/4 (D major)
2. Specie d'un canone in contrapunto doppio Andante, 2/4 (D minor)
3. Allegretto, 3/4 (D major)
4. Allegro con brio, 4/4 (D minor, ending in D major)

=== I. Vivace con brio ===
The first movement is a sonata-allegro form in 3/4 time, dominated by a motif established in the opening bars and consisting of two descending pairs of notes, firmly establishing the home key by using only notes in the D major triad.

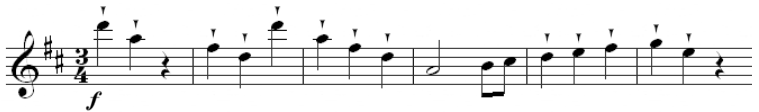

The exposition is marked for repeat, as are the development and recapitulation. The development begins with a repetition of the exposition's ending, but on unison Cs in the woodwinds and strings. The Cs come as a surprise to the listener: the note does not appear at all in the exposition. The rest of the development consists mainly of sustained notes for the woodwinds and opening descending pairs of notes in three-part counterpoint in the strings. In the recapitulation, the second half of the first theme group is heard in canon.

=== II. Andante ===
The second movement is a double variation canon in the form ABA_{1}B_{1}A_{2}, beginning and ending in the minor. The minor episodes are in double-inverted counterpoint, while the major episodes are homophonic.

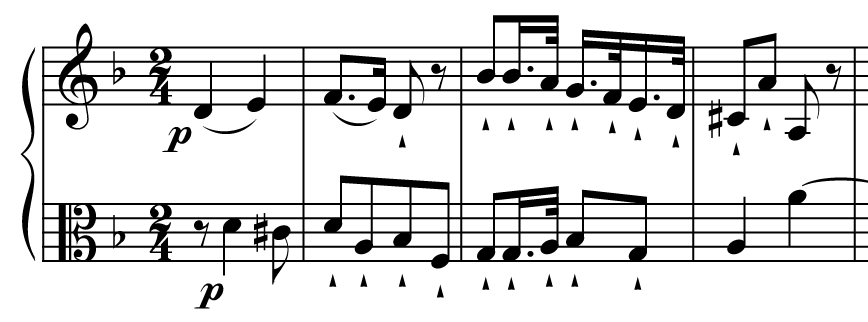

=== III. Allegretto ===
The third movement returns to the major key in a minuet with trio.

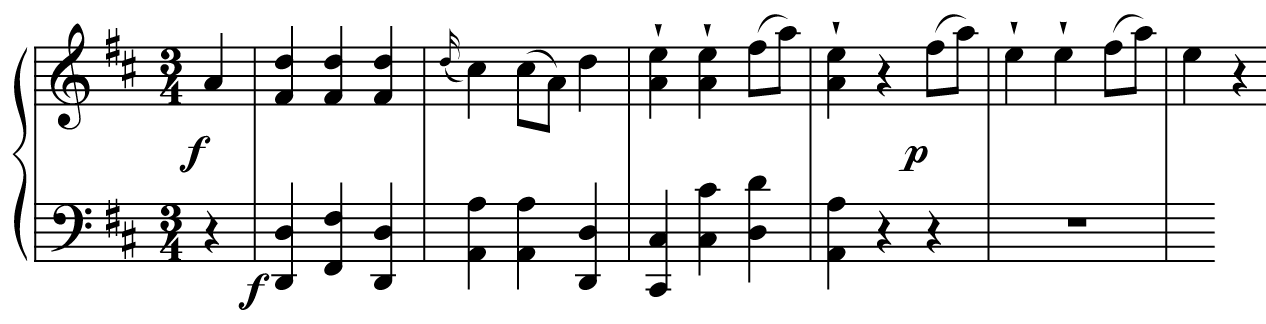

As something of a surprise, fairly unusual in Haydn's symphonic minuets, "a coda which is immensely affirmative" is added for the da capo repeat of the minuet.

=== IV. Allegro con brio ===
The final movement, in D minor, is structured in an ABABA form. The A section begins hesitantly with a five-note motif of repeated Ds, initially pianissimo, but quickly erupting into a "triple [two-part] fugue of real power."

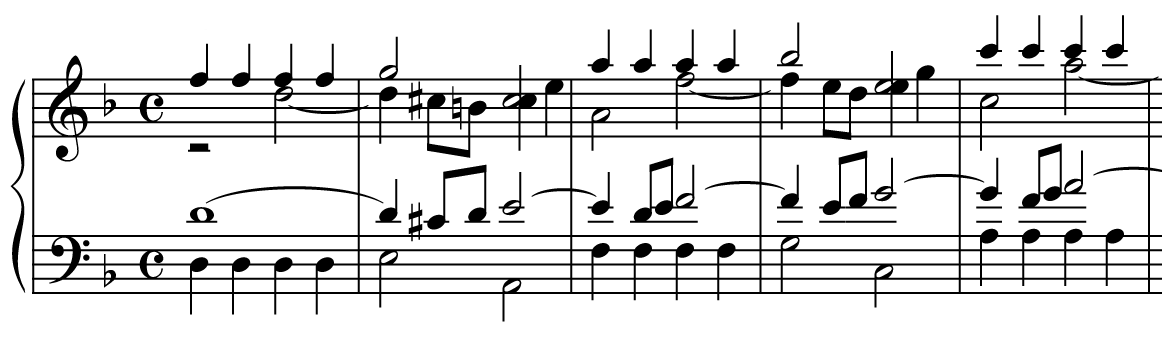

The B section is contrapuntal, with a singular theme somewhat based on the A section motif, and beginning with a fugue-like opening. This is developed at length and then winds down, leading to a short restatement of the A section and an even shorter restatement of the B section. The movement finishes with a playfully modified version of the A section in D major, ending on a single tonic note tutti. As all of the movements have the same tonic, the work is homotonal.

== Editions ==
The Cianchettini & Sperati edition of 1807 bears a dedication to the Prince of Wales; however, it omits the trumpet and timpani parts, and presents the bassoon part for three of the movements as an appendix. The edition looks like a handwritten score rather than an engraved score, but the Minuet is presented as an appendix (with bassoon part) with an engraved look contrasting with the rest of the score. Stems for half notes face the opposite of the usual direction and the dots for dotted notes are placed farther away than is customarily normal, except for dotted half notes crossing the barline which are presented as is now customary.

A more modern edition of the score comes from the Haydn-Mozart Presse in Salzburg, edited by H. C. Robbins Landon. An engraved score, it is more modern in its notation but it employs the archaic shortcut for dotted notes across barlines in which instead of a tie to a quarter note only a dot appears. More confusingly, the coda of the minuet has the annotation "Fine II" under its final barline, while the ending of the first go-round at the minuet is labelled "Fine I" even though it is also supposed to be played in the da capo. No metronome markings are provided but the duration of the work is given as "ca. 22 Min."
