= Symphony No. 2 (Schumann) =

1847 symphony by Robert Schumann

- by Robert Schumann
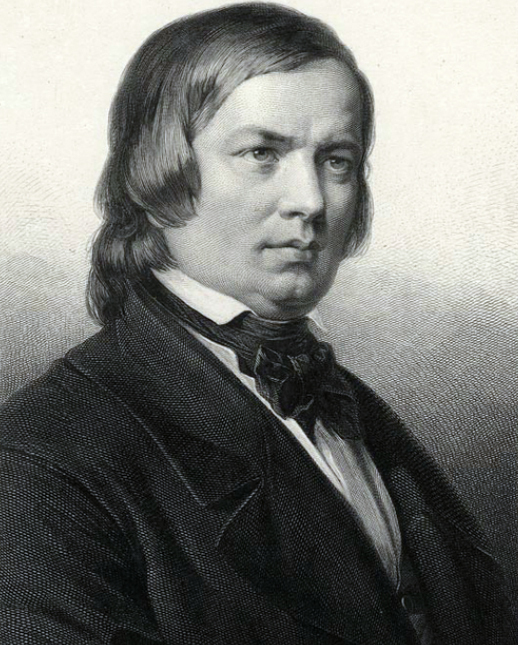
- Schumann
- Key: C major
- Opus: 61
- Composed: 12 December 1845 – 19 October 1846
- Dedication: Oscar I of Sweden
- Published: 1847
- Duration: Around 40 minutes
- Movements: 4
- Scoring: Orchestra

Premiere
- Date: 5 November 1846
- Location: Gewandhaus, Leipzig
- Conductor: Felix Mendelssohn
- Performers: Leipzig Gewandhaus Orchestra

The Symphony in C major by German composer Robert Schumann was published in 1847 as his Symphony No. 2, Op. 61, although it was the third symphony he had completed, counting the B♭ major symphony published as No. 1 in 1841, and the original version of his D minor symphony of 1841 (later revised and published as No. 4). It is dedicated to Oscar I, king of Sweden and Norway.

== Background ==
Schumann began to sketch the symphony on 12 December 1845, and had a robust draft of the entire work by the 28th of the same month. He spent most of the next year orchestrating, beginning 12 February 1846. His depression and poor health, including ringing in his ears, prevented him finishing the work until 19 October. The uplifting tone of the symphony is thus remarkable considering Schumann's health problems during the time of its composition—the work can be seen as a Beethovenian triumph over fate/pessimism, as Beethoven himself described in the Heiligenstadt Testament.

The year of 1845 was important for Schumann because it signaled a shift in his compositional strategy. He began to compose away from the piano, as he noted in his writing:

Not until the year 1845, when I began to conceive and work out everything in my head, did an entirely different manner of composition begin to develop

The strategic shift above can be ascribed to his intensive study of counterpoint in the same year with his wife, Clara Schumann. Hence, this symphony can be seen as a direct product of his shift of compositional strategy and counterpoint study.

== Music ==
External audio
- Performed by the Staatskapelle Dresden under Wolfgang Sawallisch
- I. Sostenuto assai
- II. Scherzo (Allegro vivace)
- III. Adagio espresssivo
- IV. Allegro molto vivace

The symphony is scored for an orchestra consisting of two flutes, two oboes, two clarinets (in B♭), two bassoons, two French horns (in C), two trumpets (in C), three trombones (alto, tenor, and bass), timpani, and strings.

A typical performance lasts between 35 and 40 minutes.

The symphony is written in the traditional four-movement form, and as often in the nineteenth century the Scherzo precedes the Adagio. All four movements are in C major, except the first part of the slow movement (in C minor); the work is thus homotonal:

1. Sostenuto assai — Allegro, ma non troppo
2. Scherzo: Allegro vivace
3. Adagio espressivo
4. Allegro molto vivace

=== I. Sostenuto assai – Allegro, ma non troppo ===
The first movement begins with a slow brass chorale, elements of which recur through the piece. (Schumann wrote the Six Organ Fugues on B-A-C-H, Op. 60, just before this symphony, and this preoccupation with Bach suggests a chorale prelude, a quintessential Bachian genre, in the texture and feeling of the symphony's opening. Possibly, too, Schumann was inspired by the sombre brass fanfare at the start of Haydn's 'London Symphony' (No. 104), which uses the same tonic-dominant progression.) The following Sonata-Allegro is dramatic and turbulent. It is characterized by sharp rhythmic formulae (double-dotted rhythms) and by the masterly transformation of the material of the Introduction.

=== II. Scherzo: Allegro vivace ===
The second movement is a scherzo in C major with two trios, whose main portion strongly emphasizes the diminished chord—its characteristic gesture being a rapid and playful resolution of this chord over unstable harmony. The second trio employs the B-A-C-H motif in the context of flowing eighth notes reminiscent of the Baroque, further suggesting that Bach remained on Schumann's mind after the completion of his Op. 60.

=== III. Adagio espressivo ===
The third movement is a sonata movement in C minor, with the character of an elegy, its middle section strongly contrapuntal in texture.

=== IV. Allegro molto vivace ===
The finale is in a very freely treated sonata form, its second theme related to the opening theme of the Adagio. Later in the movement at bar 280, a new theme appears: this theme has, as its sources of inspiration, the last song from Beethoven's cycle "An die ferne Geliebte" (cf. also Schumann's Piano Fantasy in C, Op. 17 and String Quartet op. 41/2), and Beethoven's "Ode to Joy." The coda of the Finale recalls the material from the Introduction, thereby thematically spanning the entire work.

== Performance history ==
The symphony was first performed on 5 November 1846, at the Gewandhaus in Leipzig with Felix Mendelssohn conducting. It was better received after a second performance some ten days later. The work ultimately came to be admired in the nineteenth century for its "perceived metaphysical content", but the symphony's popularity waned in the twentieth, owing to its unusual structure.
