= Symphony No. 49 (Haydn) =

1768 Symphony by Joseph Haydn

- La passione
- by Joseph Haydn
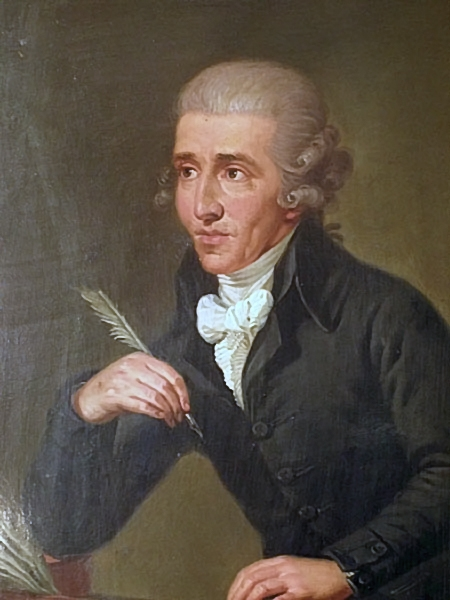
- Portrait of Joseph Haydn, ca. 1770
- Other name: Il quakuo di bel'humore
- Key: F minor
- Catalogue: Hob. I:49
- Composed: 1768
- Duration: About 20 minutes
- Movements: 4
- Scoring: Orchestra

The Symphony No. 49 in F minor, Hob. I:49, was written in 1768 by Joseph Haydn during his Sturm und Drang period. It is popularly known as La passione (The Passion).

== Instrumentation ==
The scoring of the symphony is typical of Haydn in this period: two oboes, bassoon, two horns, and strings.

== Nickname ==
As with all the other titles that have become attached to Haydn's symphonies, this did not originate with the composer himself. It was long believed that the nickname "La passione" or The Passion derived from the nature of the music itself: the slow opening movement of the sinfonia da chiesa, its minor key modality and its association with the Sturm und Drang period of Haydn's symphonic output. Drawing from this traditional reading, H.C. Robbins Landon has described it as "dark-hued, sombre – even tragic."

However, the nickname can be traced back to a single source from a performance given during Holy Week in the Northern German city of Schwerin in 1790, where performance of secular music was banned between 1756 and 1785. This suggests that the name was derived circumstantially and not thematically and that reading the symphony as having a Passion-related motif is post-facto interpretation. As Elaine Sisman has discovered:

The traditional view of this symphony is, however, strikingly at odds with the title transmitted in a Viennese source, now at the Gesellschaft der Musikfreunde: "Il Quakuo [recte quacquero] di bel'humore" – that is, the good-humoured, good-natured or waggish Quaker. The complete inscription reads: "nel suo antusiasmo [sic] il Quakuo di bel'humore / questa Sinfonia serve di Compagna a quella / del Philosopho Inglese dell' istesso autore."

This suggests that, far from being a passion-related work, the symphony has, in part at least, a theatrical provenance – a fairly common origin for Haydn's symphonic works (See, e.g. Symphonies No. 59 and 60). There was, in fact, a popular play to which this inscription likely refers. Die Quäker was the title under which Chamfort's 1764 comedy La jeune indienne was published in German. It was a popular stage piece in Vienna during the late 1760s and early 1770s. It is possible, therefore, that the "dark-hued" reading of the symphony was, in fact, an insouciant characterisation of the earnest Quaker figure from Chamfort.

== Movements ==
The four movements follow what was by then an archaic Sonata da chiesa pattern: slow, fast, slow (minuet), fast. It was the last time Haydn was to follow this scheme in a symphony.

1. Adagio, 3/4
2. Allegro di molto, 4/4
3. Menuet e Trio, 3/4
4. Finale: Presto, 2/2

The symphony is homotonal as all the movements are in F minor, although the trio is in F major, providing a glimpse of brightness in the generally pessimistic scene. The two quick movements are notable for their forward drive and relentless energy.

== See also ==
- List of symphonies by name
