= Monotonality =

Theoretical concept

Monotonality is a theoretical concept, principally deriving from the theoretical writings of Arnold Schoenberg and Heinrich Schenker, that in any piece of tonal music only one tonic is ever present, modulations being only regions or prolongations within, or extensions of the basic tonality.

== History ==
Schoenberg laid out his concept of monotonality in his book Structural Functions of Harmony, writing that: "According to this principle, every digression from the tonic is considered to be still within the tonality, whether directly or indirectly, closely or remotely related. In other words, there is only one tonality in a piece, and every segment formerly considered as another tonality is only a region, a harmonic contrast within that tonality...subordinate to the central power of [its] tonic. Thus comprehension of the harmonic unity within a piece is achieved."

== See also ==
- Homotonality
- Progressive tonality
- Prolongation
- Schenkerian analysis
