= Symphony No. 25 (Haydn) =

Symphony in three movements by Joseph Haydn

Joseph Haydn

The Symphony No. 25 in C major, Hoboken I/25, is a symphony by Joseph Haydn.The symphony was most likely composed in 1763, or at the very earliest in 1761, at about the same time as No. 33.

The symphony is scored for two oboes, bassoon, two horns, strings, and continuo, and unlike most C major symphonies by Haydn lacks trumpets and timpani.

It is in three movements:

1. Adagio, 4/4 — Allegro molto, 2/4
2. Minuetto & Trio, 3/4
3. Presto, 2/4

Unusually among Haydn's symphonies, this work lacks a slow movement, but it is partially compensated by the slow introduction.
