= Symphony No. 59 (Haydn) =

Symphony by Joseph Haydn

- Fire
- by Joseph Haydn
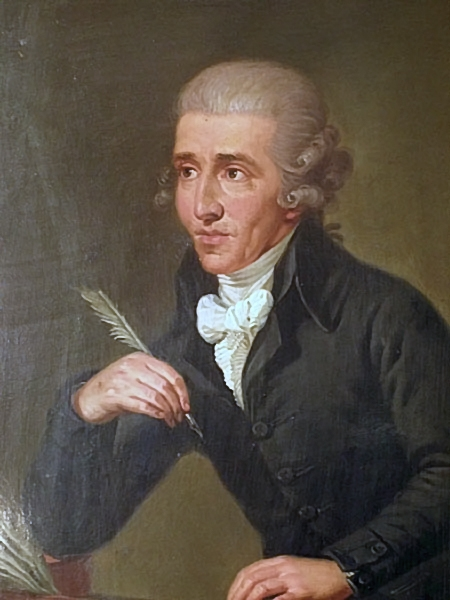
- Portrait of Joseph Haydn, ca. 1770
- Key: A major
- Catalogue: Hob. I:59
- Composed: between c. 1765–69
- Duration: c. 20 minutes
- Movements: 4
- Scoring: Orchestra

Symphony No. 59 in A major, popularly known as the Fire Symphony, is a symphony by Joseph Haydn. Composed under the auspices of Nikolaus Esterházy, it was written in the middle or late 1760s.

== Nickname (Fire) ==
The symphony has long been popularly known as the Feuer or Fire symphony. The nickname likely derives from the use of several movements as accompanying music to a performance of the play Die Feuersbrunst by Gustav Friedrich Wilhelm Großmann, which was performed at Eszterháza in either (depending on the source) 1774 or 1778.

== Music ==
The symphony is scored for two oboes, two French horns, continuo (bassoon, harpsichord), and strings.

It is in standard four-movement form:

1. Presto, 4/4
2. Andante di molto più tosto Allegretto, 3/4
3. Menuet e Trio, 3/4
4. Finale: Allegro

The opening movement starts off energetically on an upbeat followed by octave drop. Following the initial outburst, the music dramatically relaxes and comes to a full stop. This was a technique he used to an even greater effect in his 48th symphony from about the same time period. The relaxation also appears at the end of the movement giving the listener the quiet curtain raising music that often occurs at the end of an opera overture.

In the slow movement, the winds are silent for most of the movement—leaving the listener to expect that the movement is scored for strings alone. These expectations are quelled when full orchestration enters for the second theme in the recapitulation.

Haydn rarely used the same meter for consecutive movements as he did with the inner two movements in this work. There are melodic links between these movements, both in A minor, as well as both start with the same sequence of pitches. The second theme of the slow movement is also alluded to.

The finale begins with a horn call followed by a response in the oboes and at the end of the exposition it is the strings and oboe that have a dialogue. Haydn uses a similar horn call to start the finale of his 103rd symphony over twenty-five years later. Following a brief development, the return of the horn call is only hinted at in the strings in the start of the recapitulation which then follows in a relatively straightforward manner. The horn call in its proper instrumentation is saved for the movement coda.

== See also ==
- List of symphonies with names
