= Eszterháza =

Palace in Fertőd, Hungary

Coordinates: 47°37′14″N 16°52′18″E

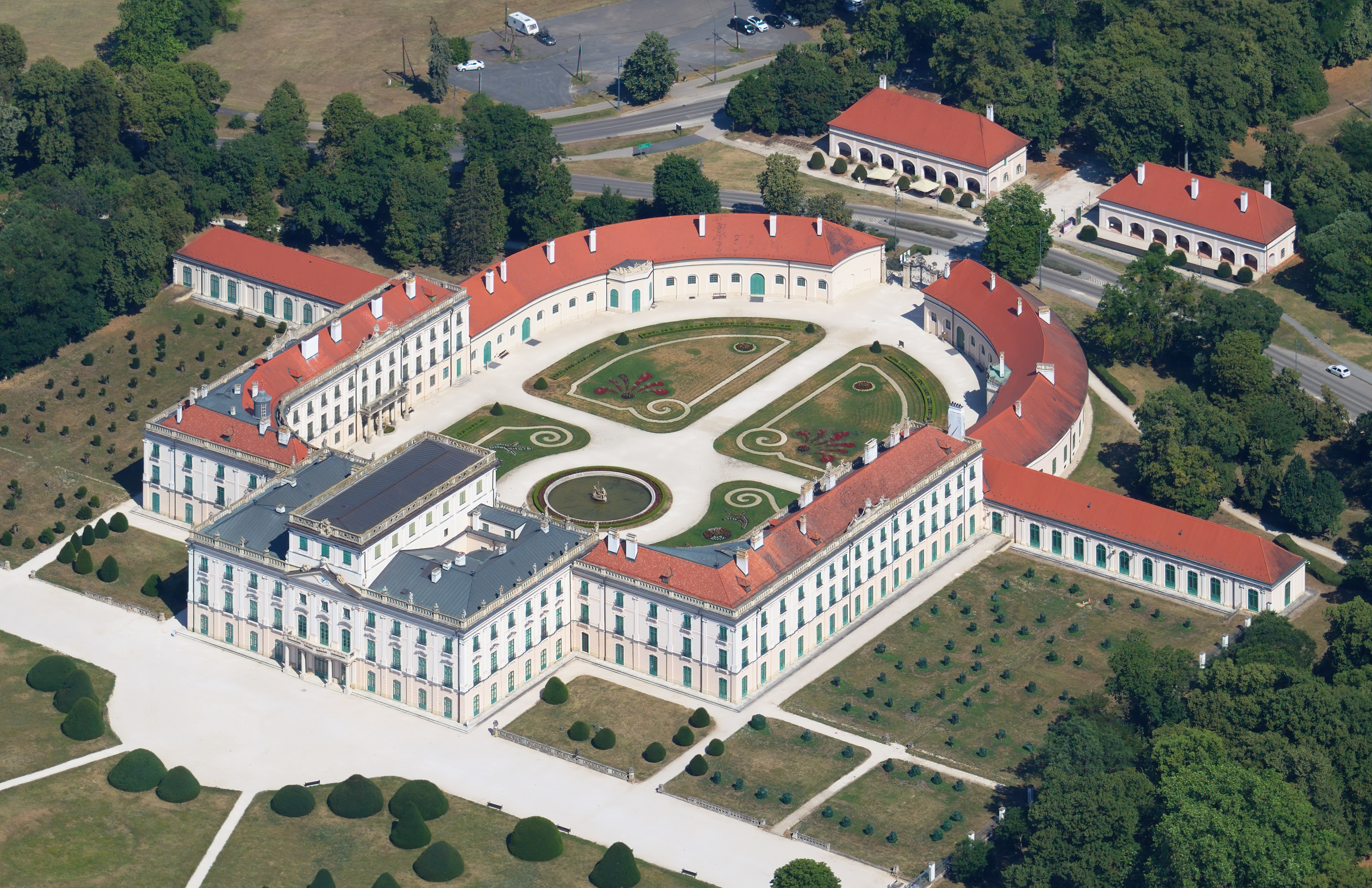
Aerial view

Eszterháza is a palace in Fertőd, Hungary, built by Prince Nikolaus Esterházy. Sometimes called the "Hungarian Versailles", it is Hungary's grandest Rococo edifice. It was the home of Joseph Haydn and his orchestra from 1766 to 1790.

== History ==
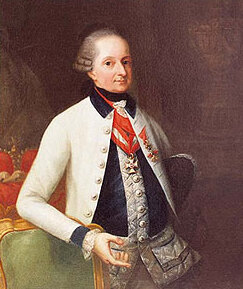
Prince Nikolaus Esterházy, builder of Esterháza

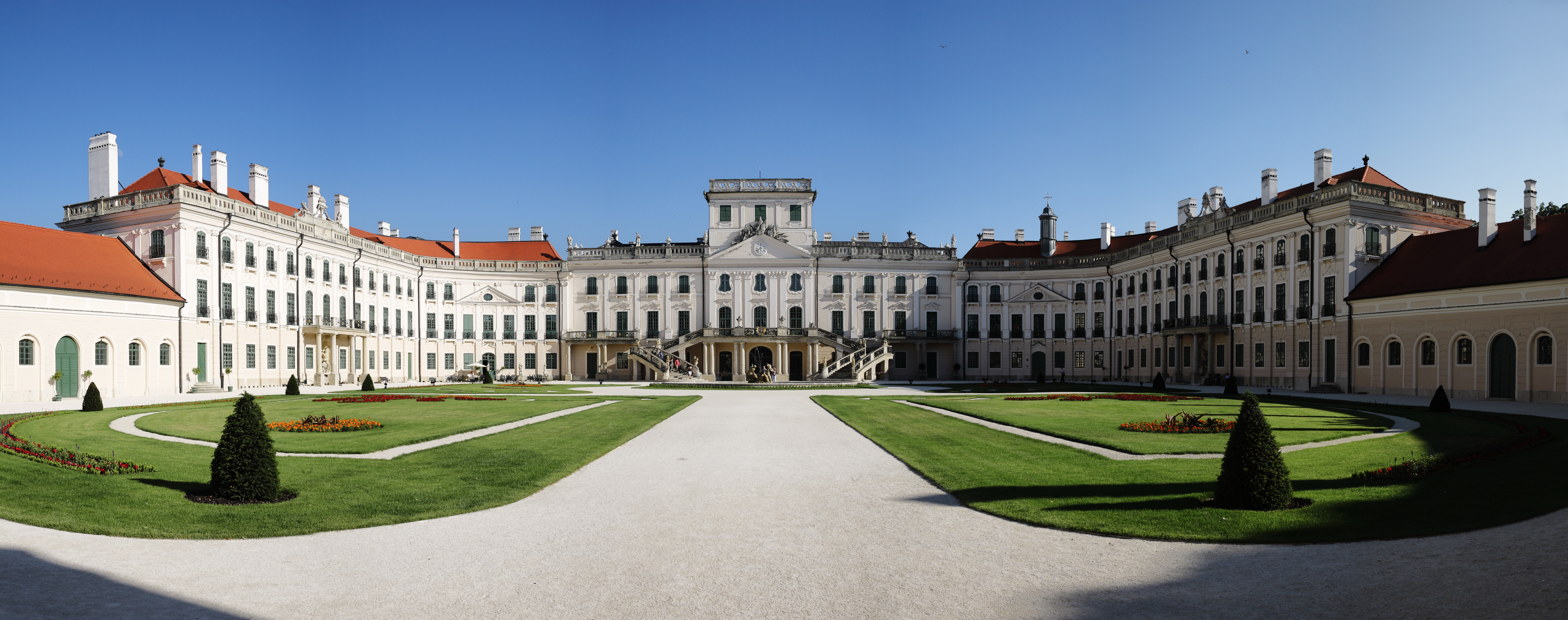
Eszterháza

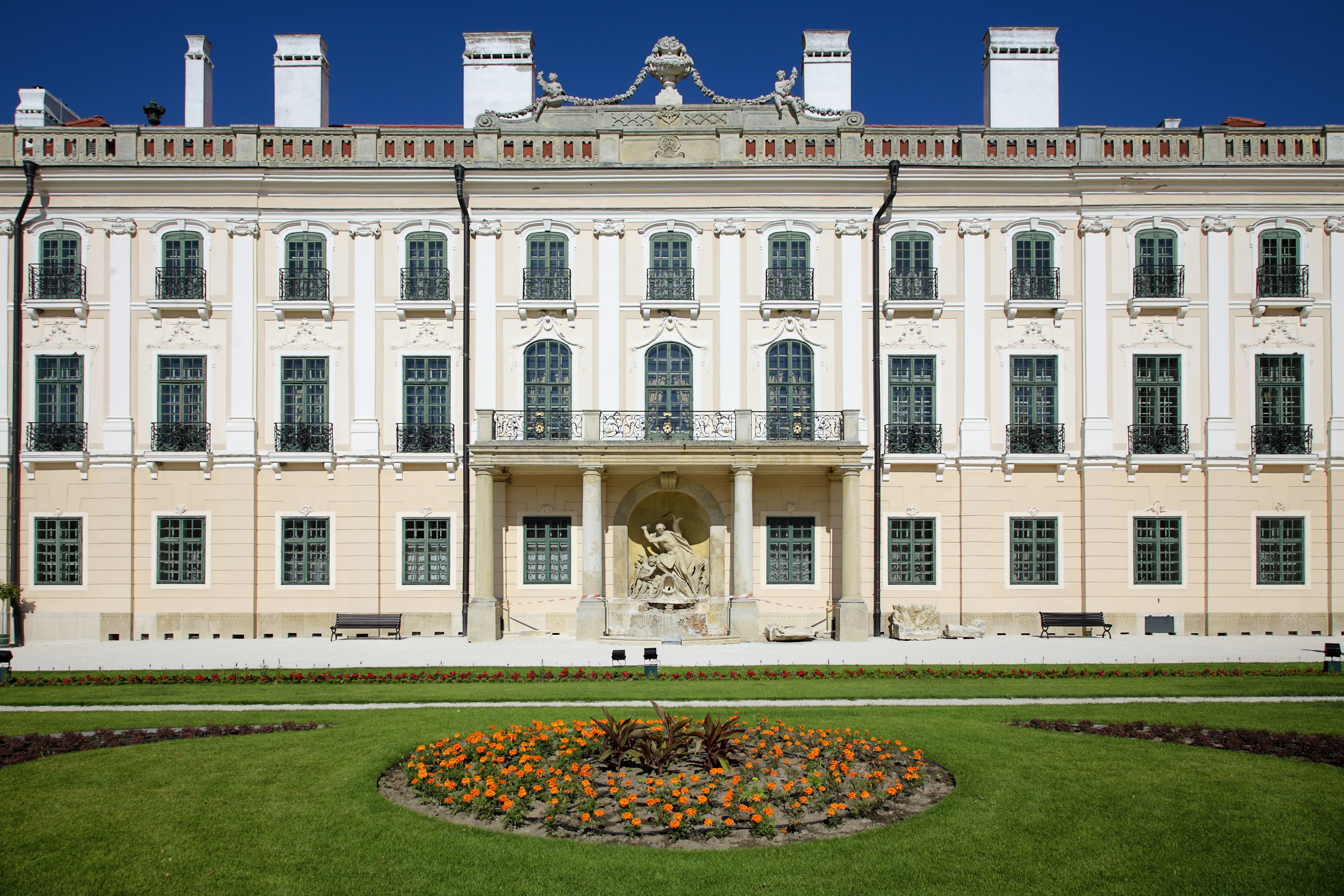
Esterházy Castle, Imre Madách Promenade

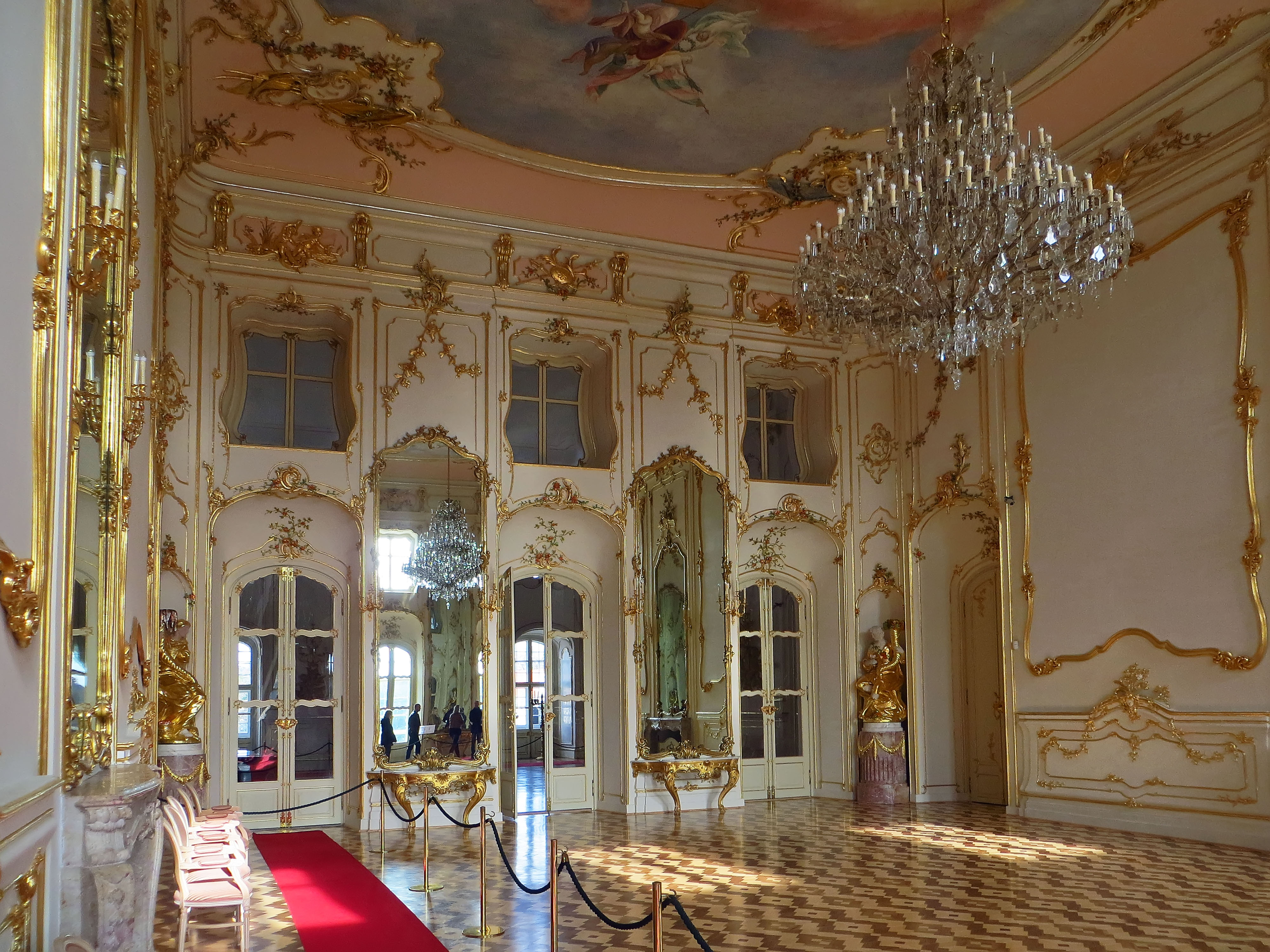
The Banquet hall

Esterháza was not the primary or ancestral home of the Esterházy family; that was Schloss Esterházy, a palace nearby (40 kilometers (25 mi) away), in Kismarton (today Eisenstadt, Austria).

Nikolaus Esterhazy began his plans for a new palace not long after he became reigning prince in 1762 on the death of his brother Paul Anton. Before this time, Miklós (Nikolaus) was accustomed to spending much of his time at a hunting lodge called Süttör, built in the same location around 1720 with a design by Anton Erhard Martinelli. The hunting lodge was the nucleus around which Esterháza was built.

The first architect to work on the project was Johann Ferdinand Mödlhammer, succeeded in 1765 by Melchior Hefele. While the palace is often compared to Versailles, which the Prince had visited in 1764 when he visited Paris, H. C. Robbins Landon claims that a more direct influence can be found in "Austrian prototypes, particularly Schönbrunn palace in Vienna." Three of the windows above the main entrance are designed as homage to stringed instruments, namely violin, viola, cello.

The palace cost the Prince the sum of 13 million Austrian gulden, a figure that Robbins Landon terms "astronomical".

Eszterháza was first inhabited in 1766, but construction continued for many years. The opera house was completed in 1768 (the first performance was of Joseph Haydn's opera Lo speziale), the marionette theater in 1773. Joseph Haydn's concerts typically took place in the Sala Terrena on the ground floor, in the picture gallery, where on May 30, 1781, a concert was performed in the presence of Prince Albert Casimir, Duke of Teschen and his spouse, Archduchess Maria Christina of Austria, daughter of the Empress Maria Theresa. Musical entertainment for the higher ranks was provided in the main building, typically located in the picture gallery ground floor. Regular free-to-attend academies were typically held in the marionette theater, which were open to the public and hosting a whole range of cultural and environmental programmes. The fountain in front of the palace was not completed until 1784, at which point the Prince considered his project complete. The music room was decorated with white and gold walls with delicately rounded corners, the frescoed ceiling, glass chandeliers, roses, and audience's period chairs.

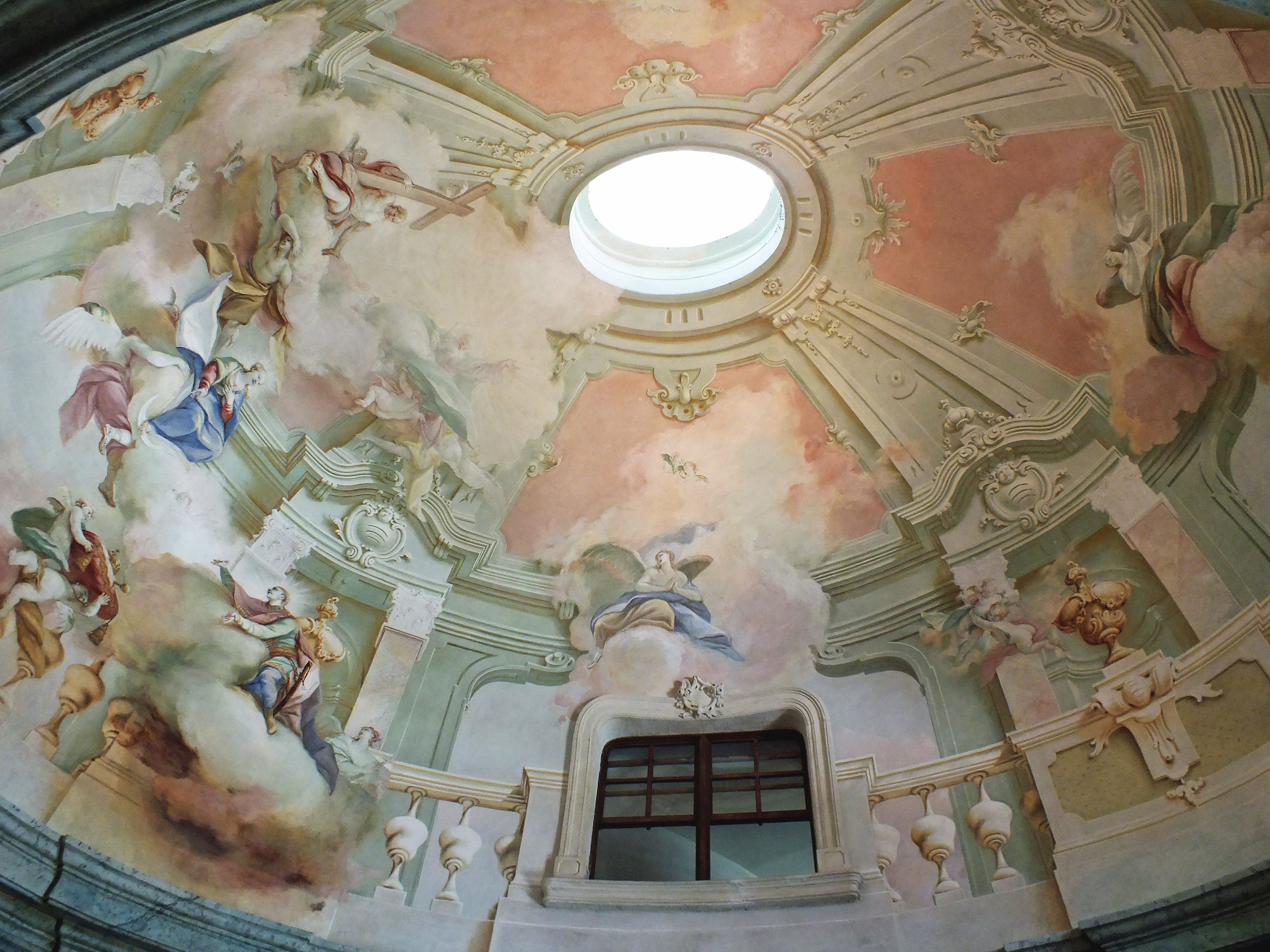
Dome of the Chapel, depicting the Coronation of the Virgin

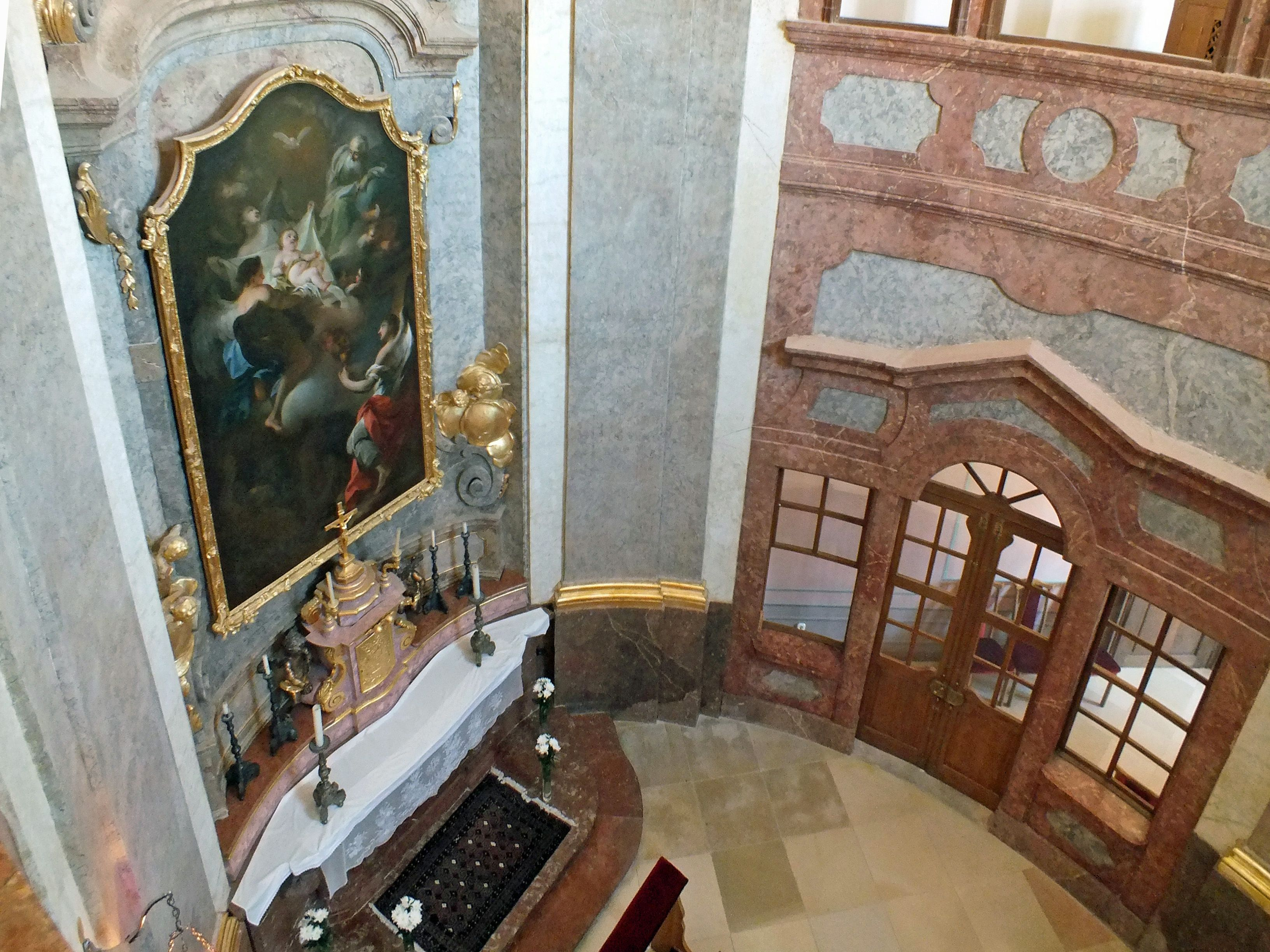
Altar depicting the Nativity of Christ

Nikolaus Esterházy died in 1790. Neither his son Anton, who inherited the Esterházy lands, nor any of his later successors had any interest in living in the isolated palace.

== Location ==
The palace was built near the south shore of the Neusiedler See, on swampy land, a health hazard at the time. Robbins Landon notes that "it was a particularly eccentric idea on the part of Prince Nicolaus to choose it as the site for a large castle. Possibly the castle's existence was to prove 'mind over matter'".

== Rooms ==
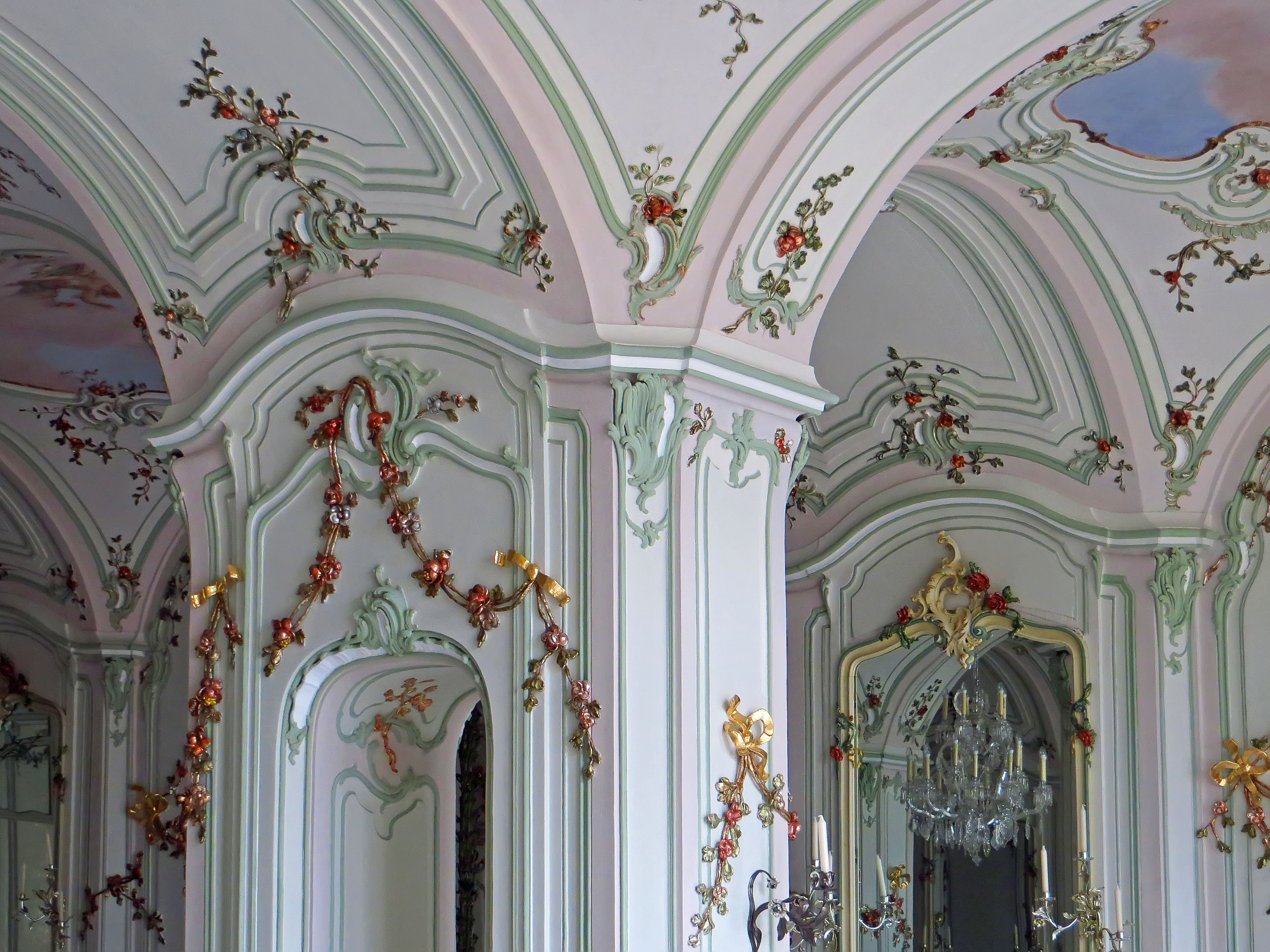
Sala Terrena of the Esterházy Palace

The palace has 126 rooms. The Banquet Room has on its ceiling a painting of Apollo in his Chariot. The large library holds almost 22,000 volumes and is graced with the letter 'E', standing for the family surname. The largest room is the grotto-like Sala Terrana which was inspired by the then fashionable Italianate style. On the ceiling are dancing Angels who hold wreaths of flowers in the shape of an 'E'.

== Haydn at Eszterháza ==
From 1766 to 1790, the estate was the home of the celebrated composer Joseph Haydn, where he lived in a four-room flat in a large two-storey building housing servants' quarters, separate from the palace. Haydn wrote the majority of his symphonies for the Prince's orchestra. Eszterháza also had two opera houses, the main theatre seating 400 (destroyed by fire in 1779) and a marionette theatre; Haydn conducted his own and others' operas, often with more than a hundred performances per year.

The palace was geographically isolated, a factor which led to loneliness and tedium among the musicians. This is seen in Haydn's unhappy letters to his friend Marianne von Genzinger, as well as in the origin story of Haydn's Farewell Symphony, written as a polite (and effective) protest against a too long extended stay by the musicians at Esterháza.

== Picture gallery ==
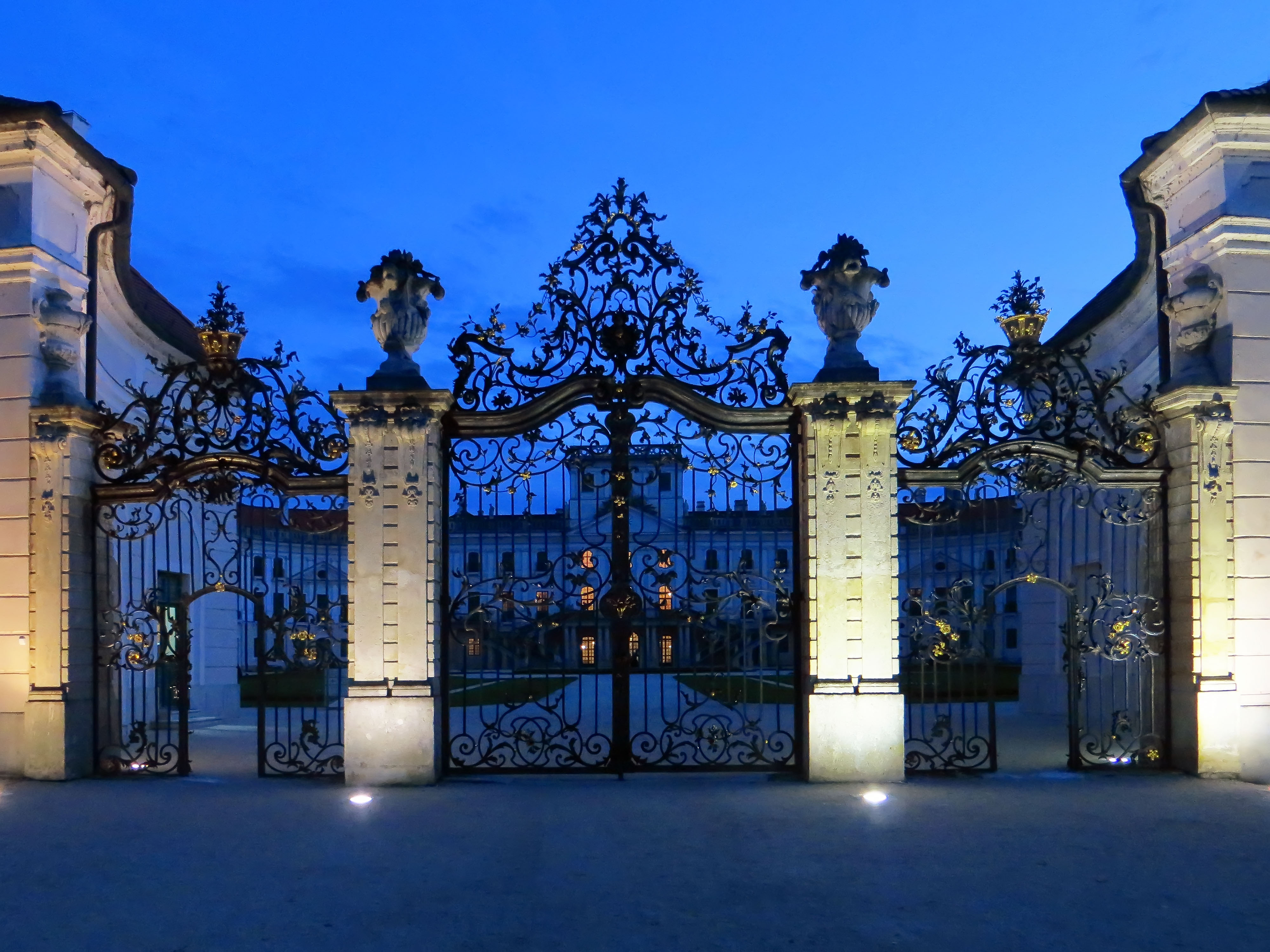

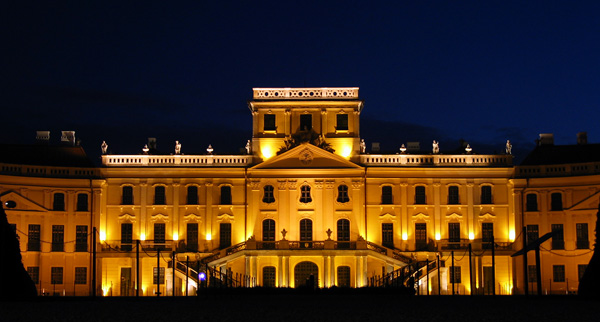

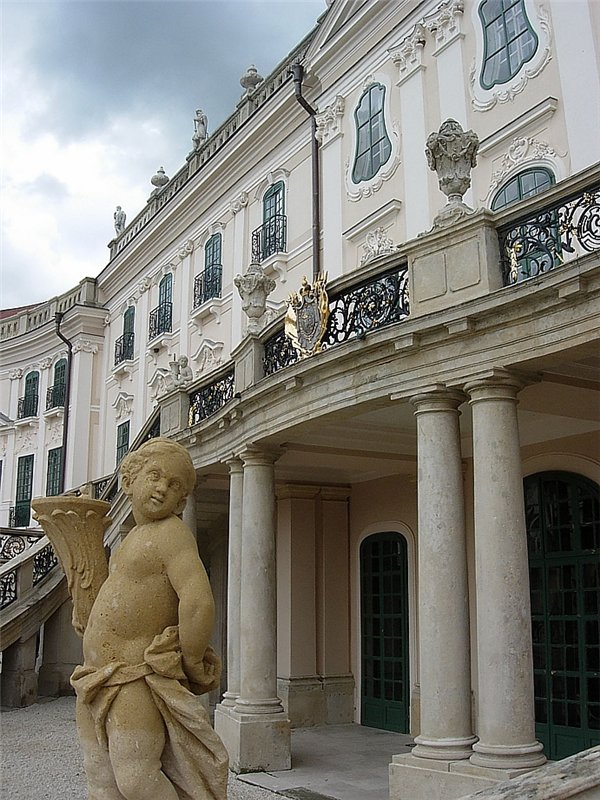

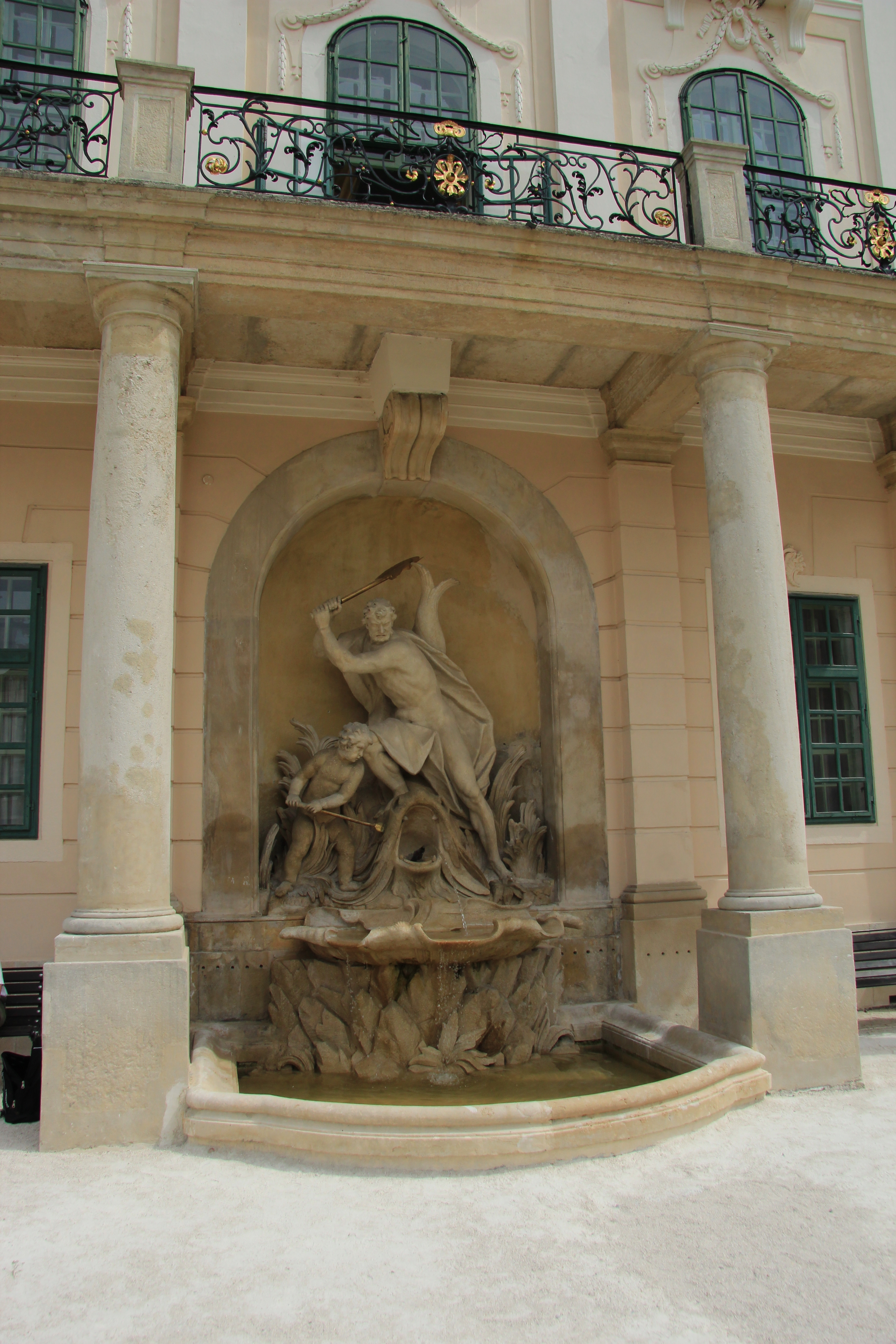

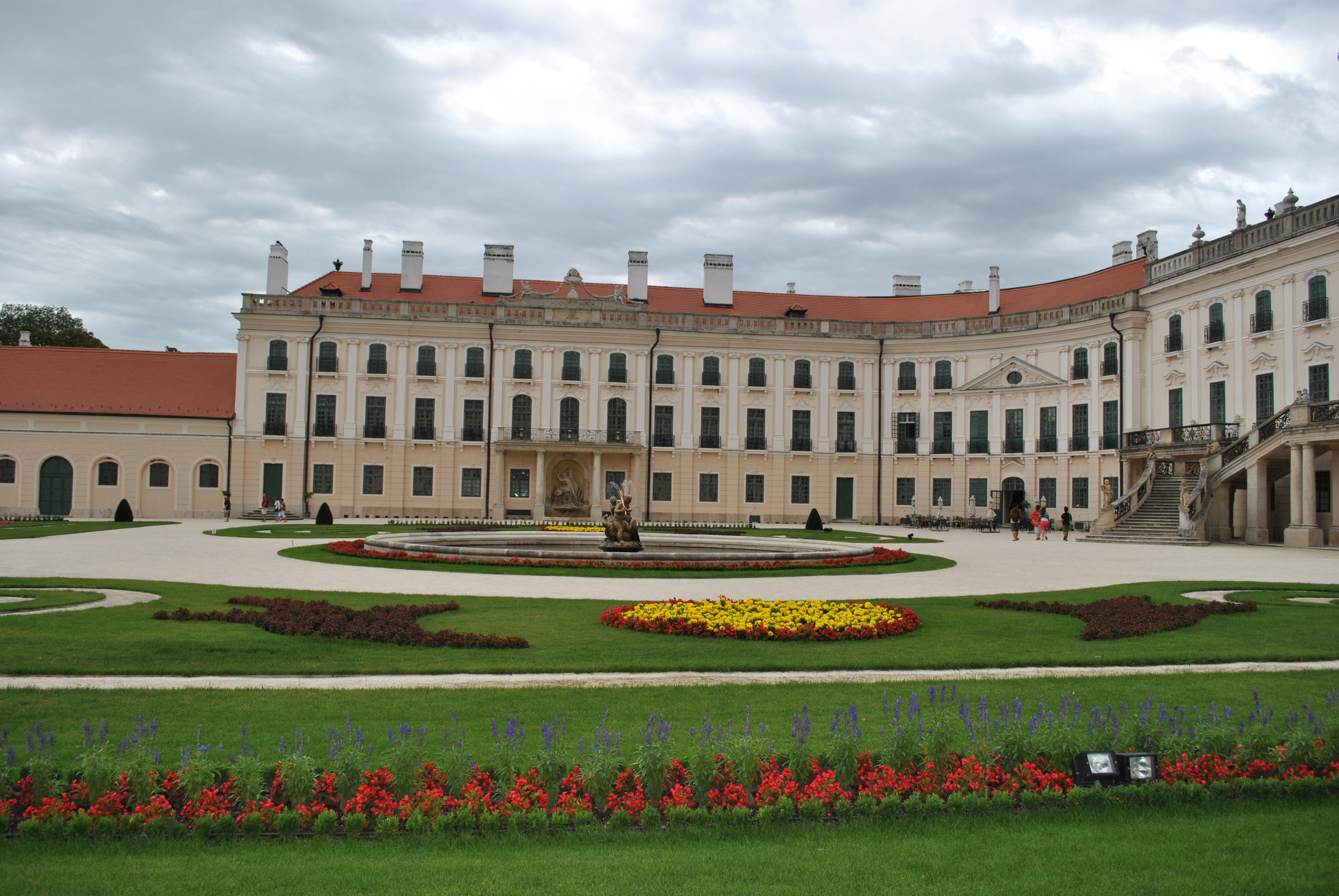

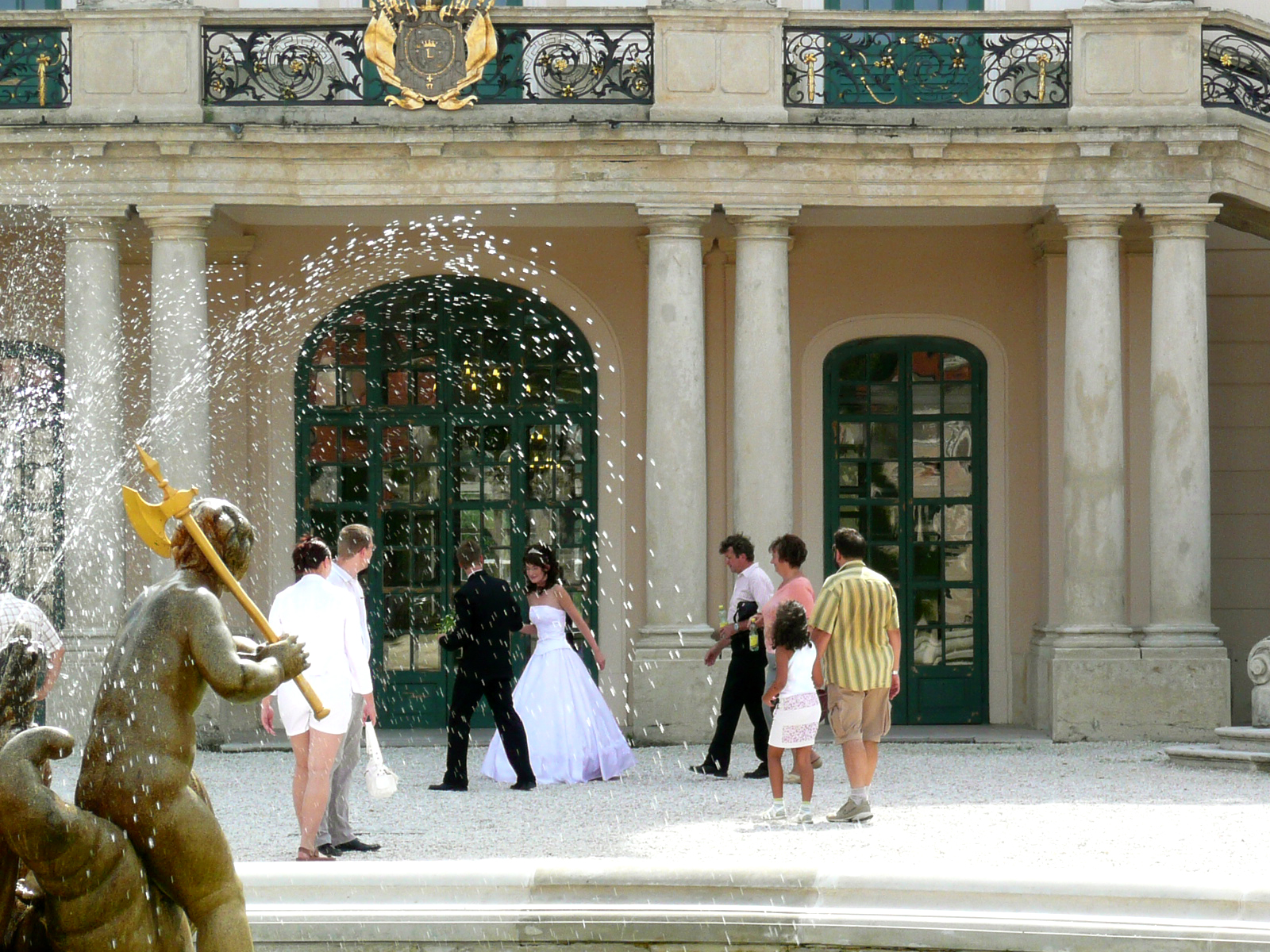
The fountain with a wedding in 2008

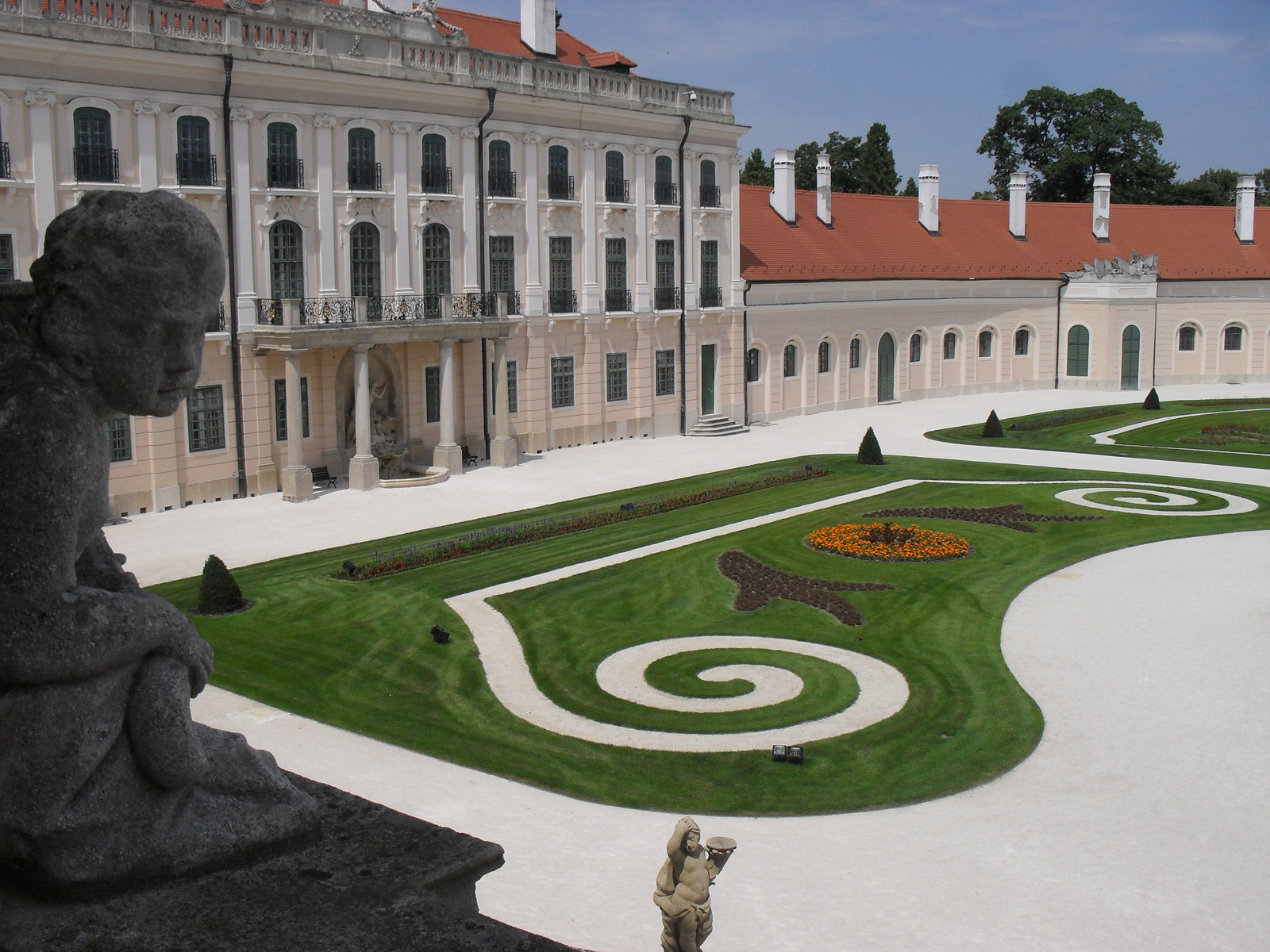

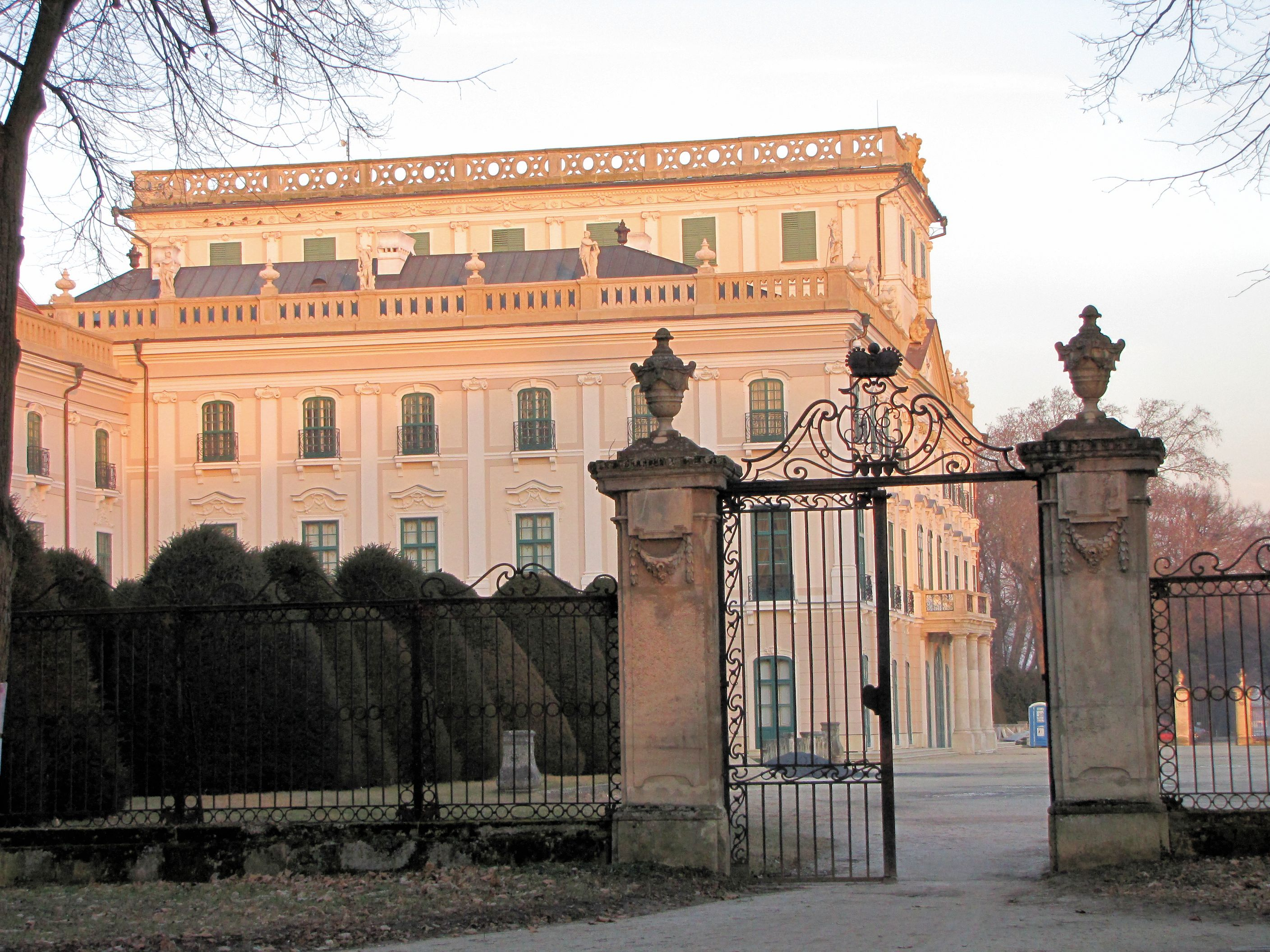

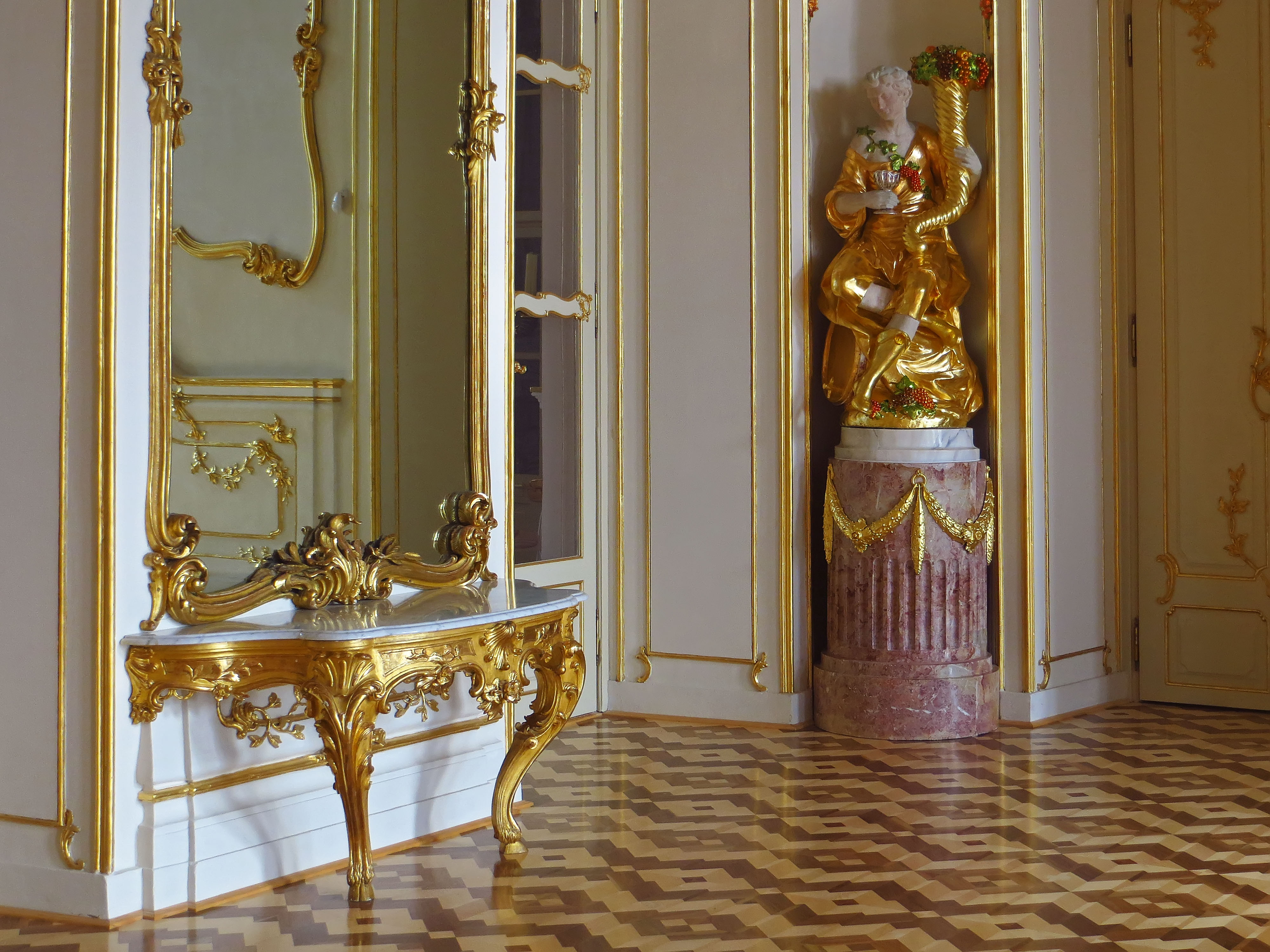

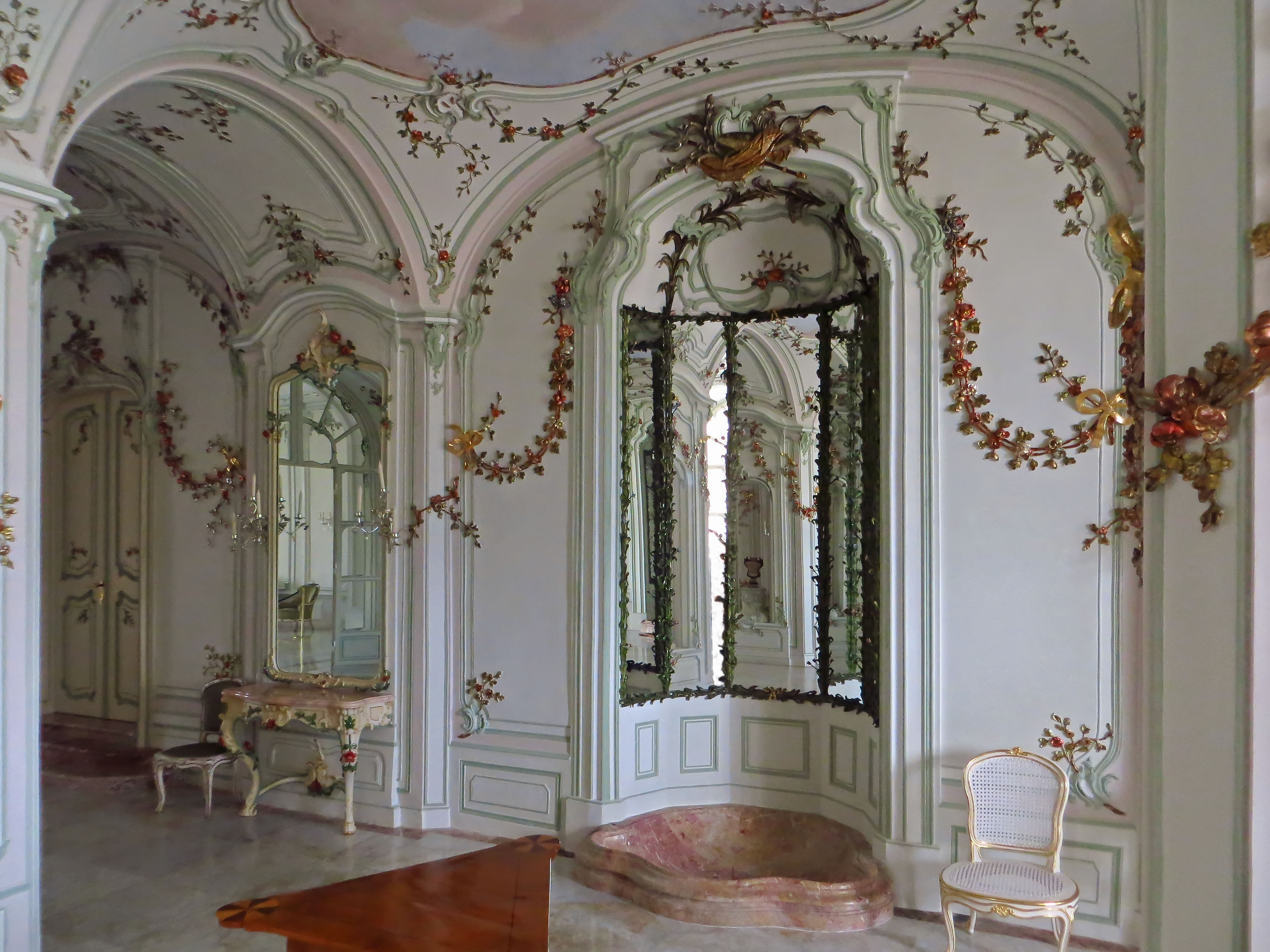

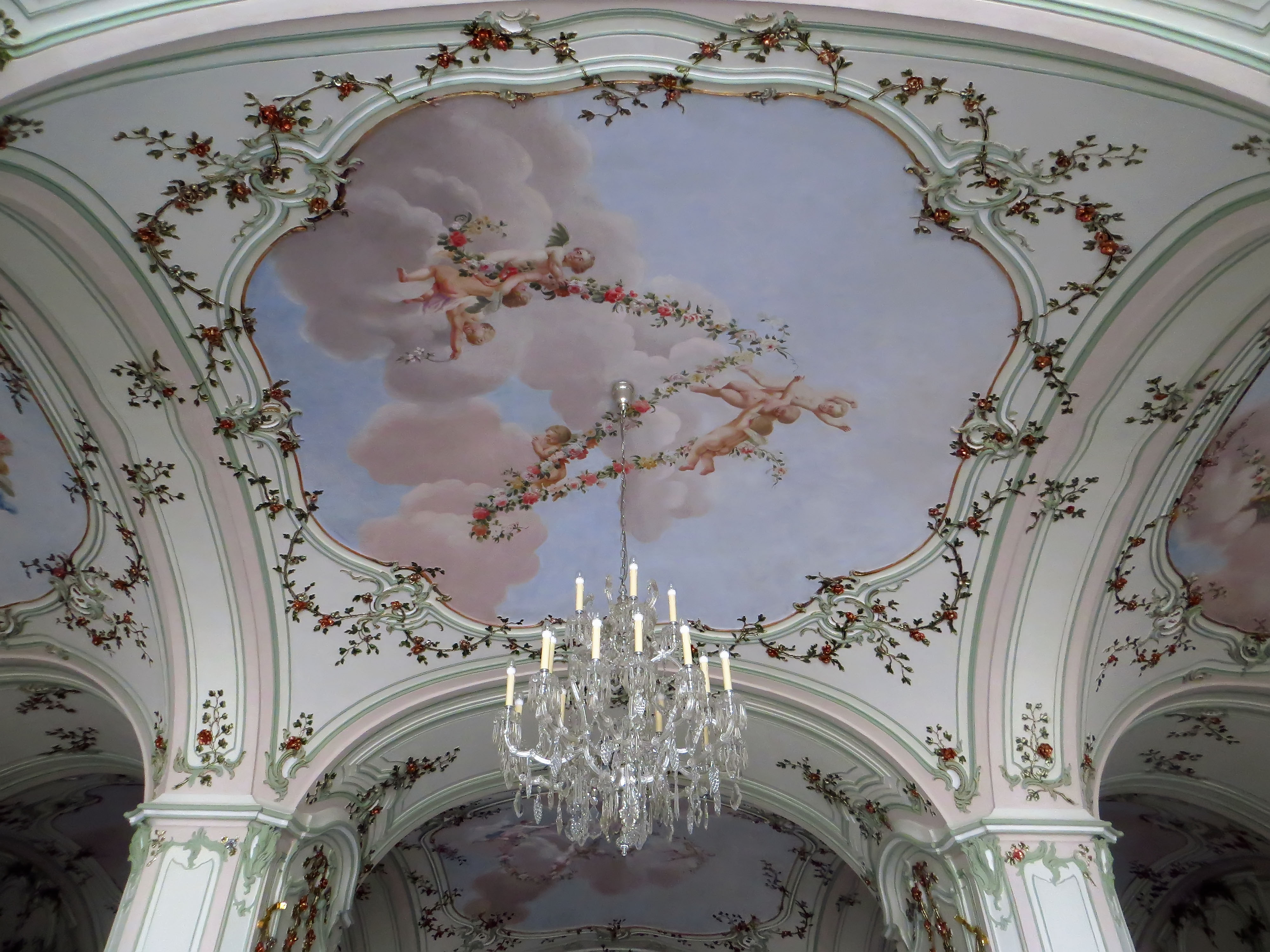

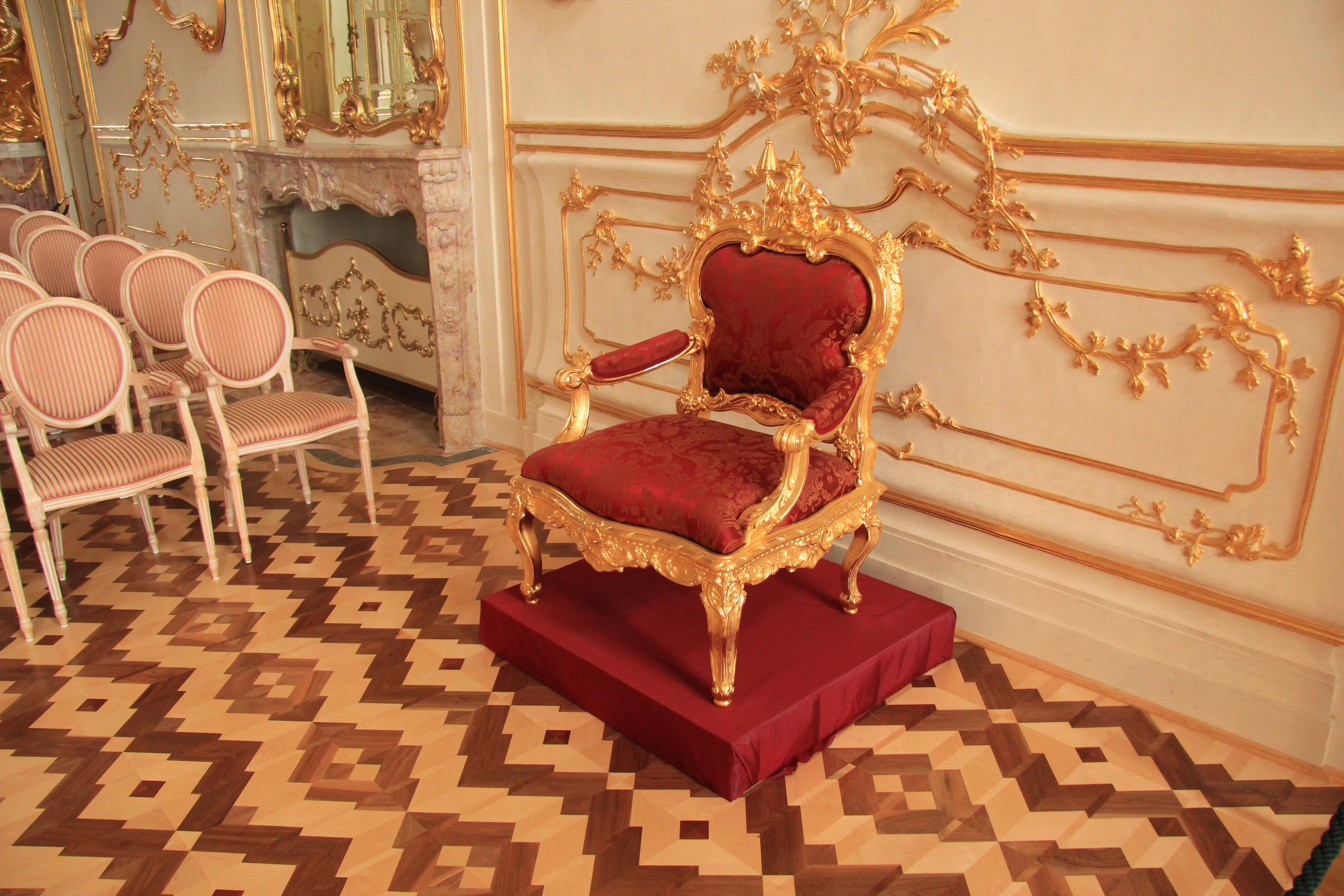

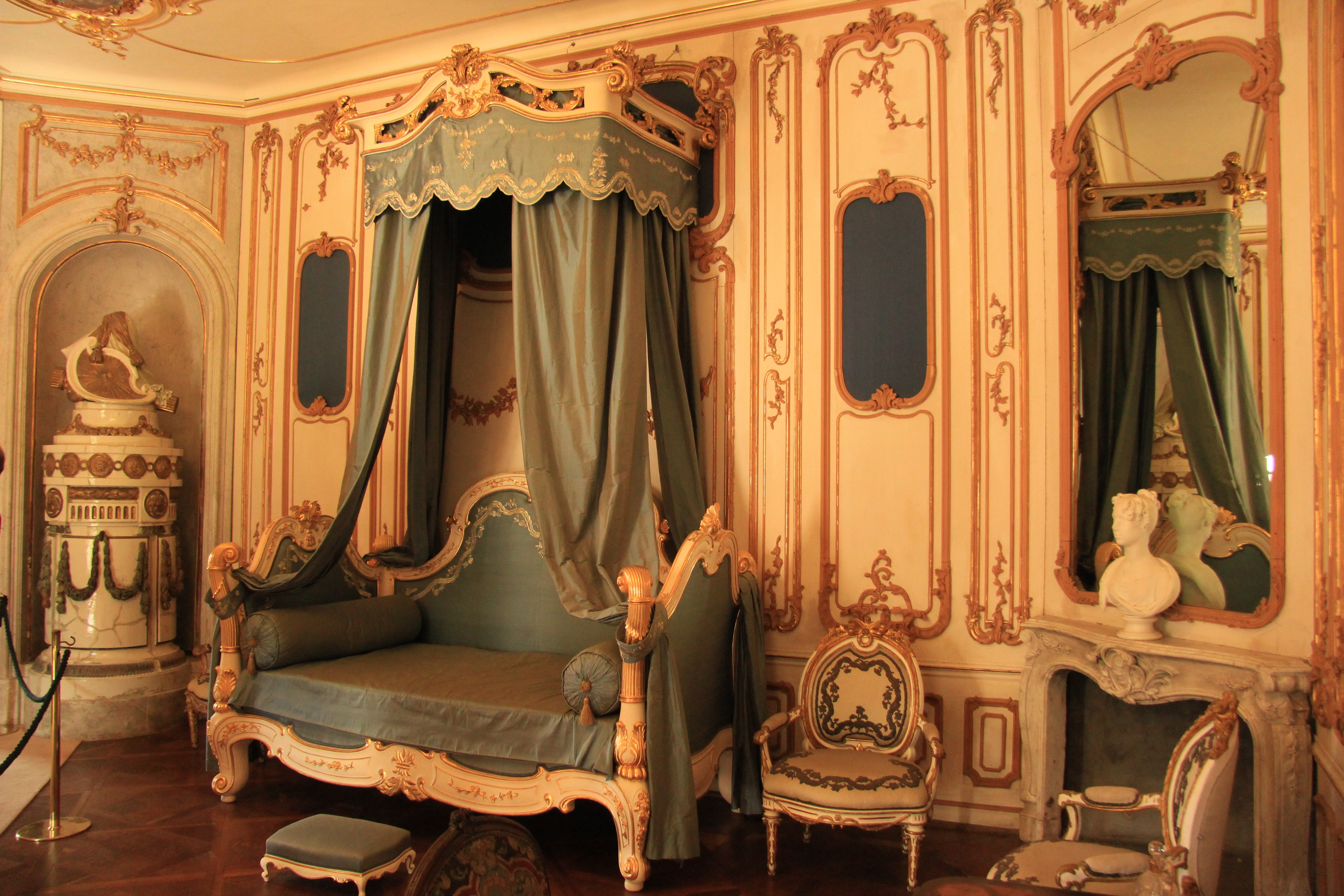

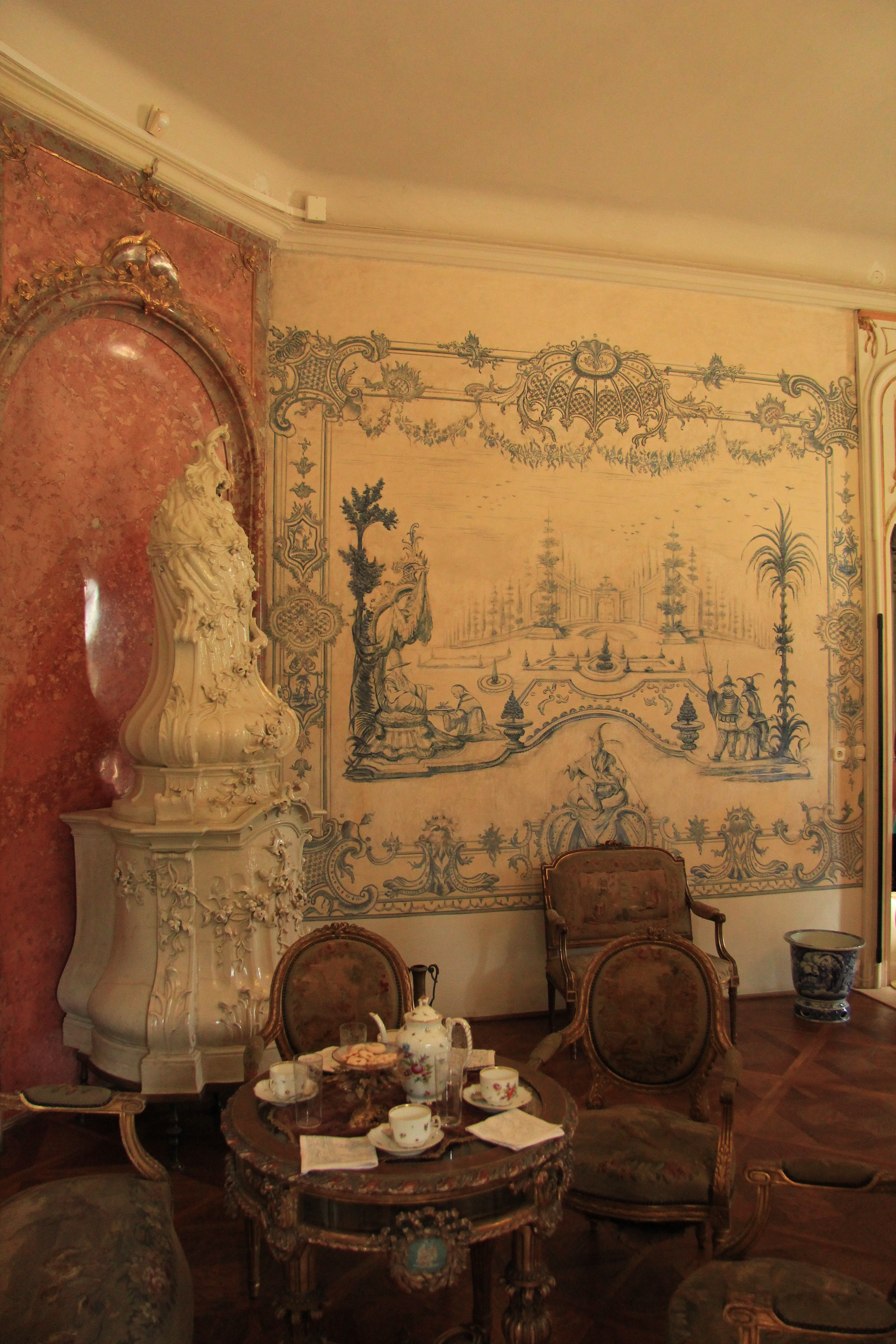

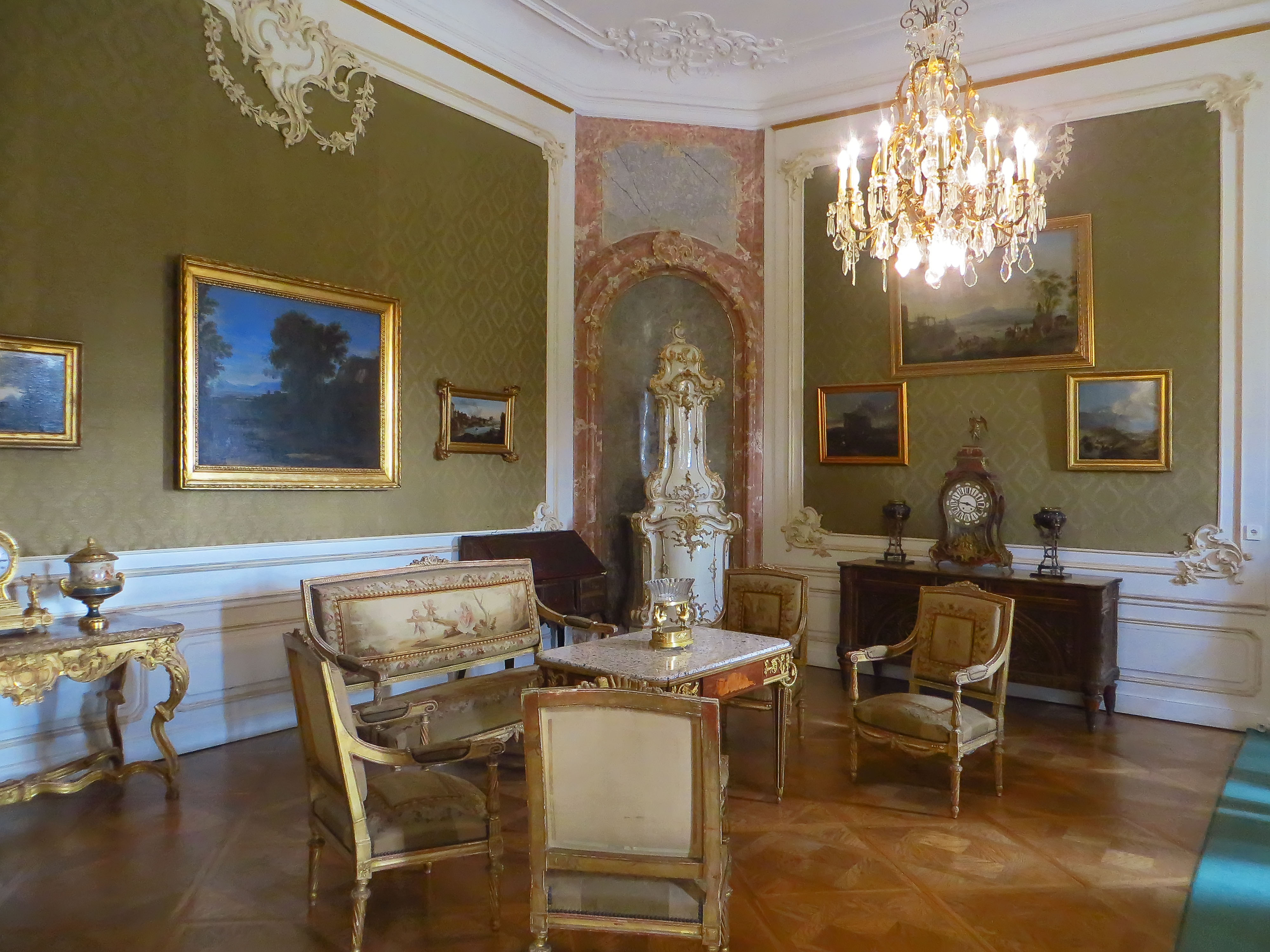

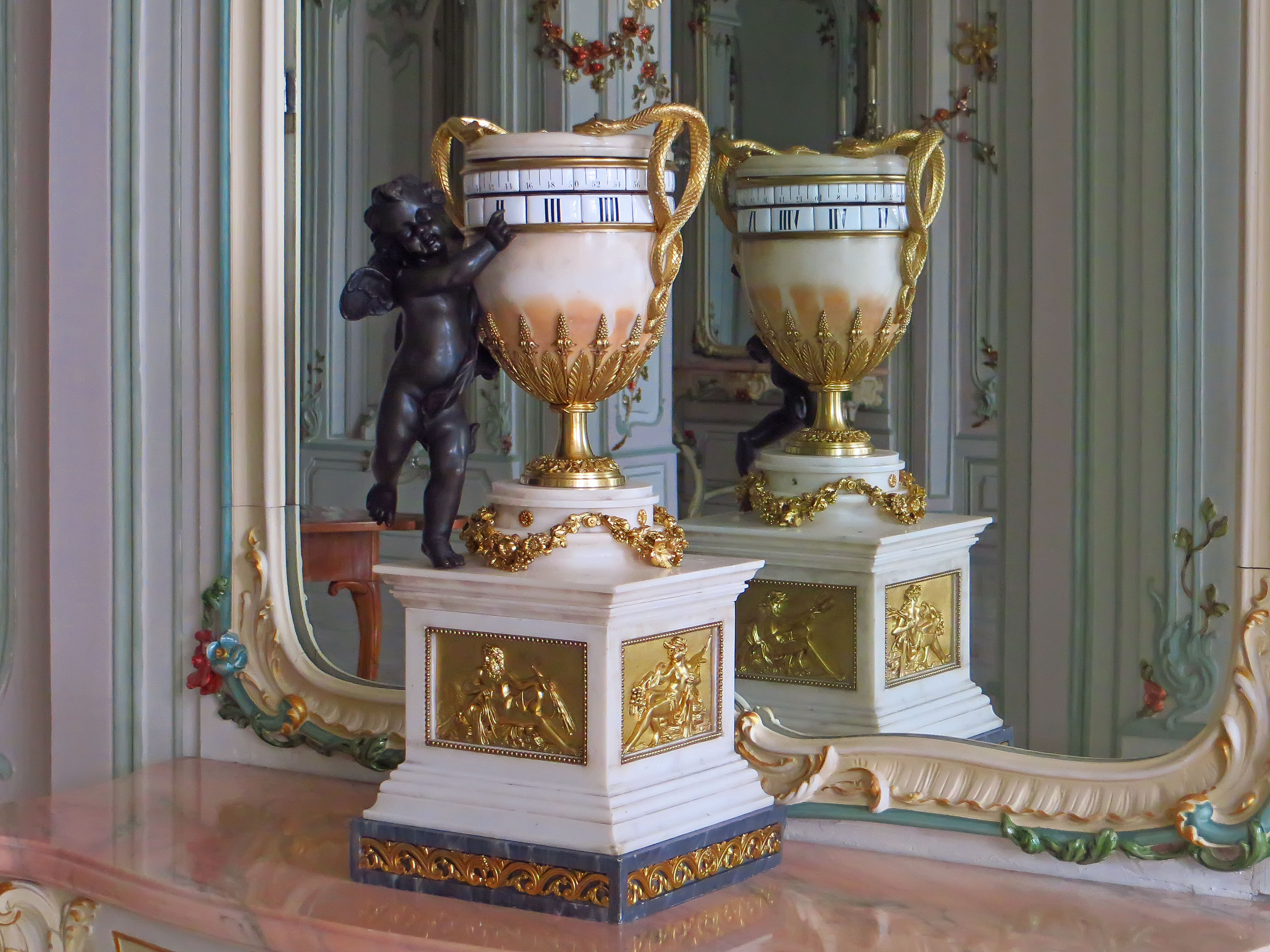

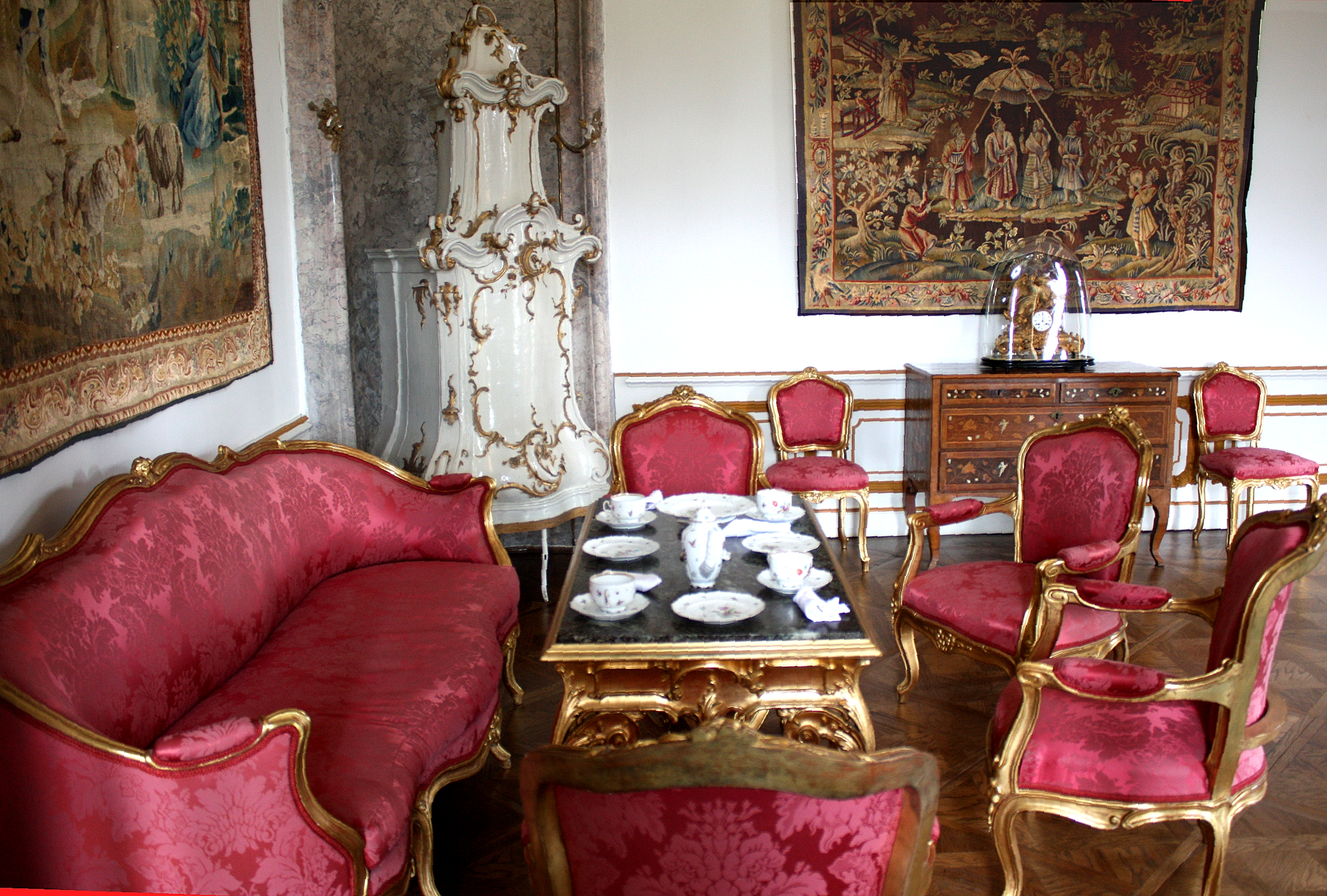

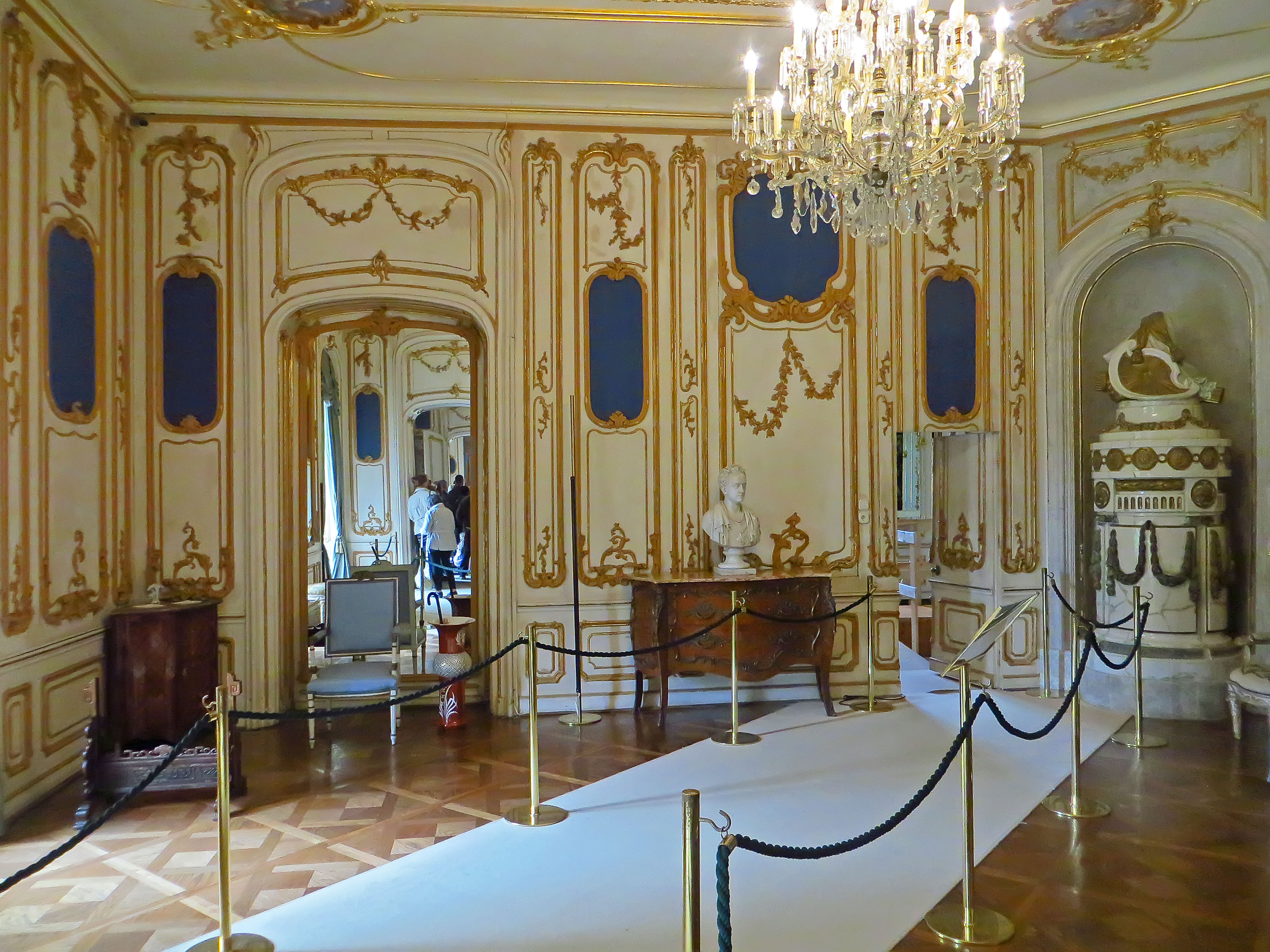

== See also ==
- Buildings inspired by Versailles
- House of Esterházy
- List of residences of Joseph Haydn
- Schloss Esterházy
