= 1764 in music =

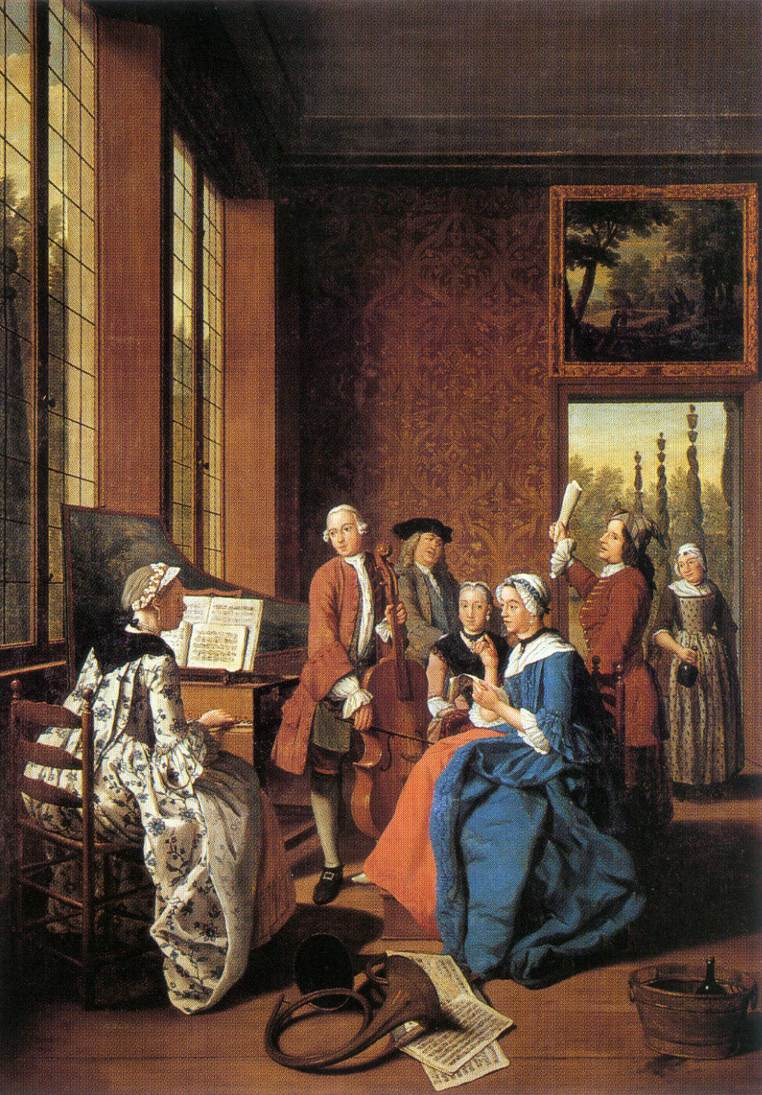

== Events ==
- April 10 – The Mozart family set out for London, where the 8-year-old Wolfgang Amadeus Mozart meets Johann Christian Bach and writes his First Symphony.
- Autumn – Following the death of his patron Keyserlingk, Wilhelm Friedemann Bach leaves his post as organist at Halle.
- date unknown – The castrato Domenico Annibali retires from the stage.
- Carl Ditters von Dittersdorf becomes Kapellmeister at the court of Adam Patachich in Großwardein, replacing Michael Haydn and restructuring the orchestra of the bishop's palace.

== Popular music ==
- The Temple of Comus or Every Gentleman and Lady's Beard, Brent and Lowe: Being Songs for the Year 1764

== Classical music ==
- Johann Christian Bach – 6 Keyboard Trios, Op. 2
- Michel Corrette – Carillon, ajouté à la Messe des Morts de Gilles
- Joseph Haydn
  - Symphony No.14 in A major
  - Symphony No.15 in D major
  - Symphony No.21 in A major
  - Symphony no 22 ("Philosopher")
  - Symphony No.23 in G major
  - Symphony No.24 in D major
  - Divertimento in C major Hob. XIV:4
  - Qual dubbio o(r)mai
- Michael Haydn – Trumpet Concerto
- Ignacio de Jerusalem – Matins for the Virgin of Guadalupe
- Joseph Kelway – 6 Harpsichord Sonatas
- Wolfgang Amadeus Mozart
  - Violin Sonata in B-flat major, K.8
  - Violin Sonata in C major, K.14
  - Symphony No.1 in E-flat major, K.16
- Johann Baptist Georg Neruda – 6 Trio Sonatas
- Giuseppe Antonio Paganelli - Six sonates d'un goût agréable..., published posthumously
- Johann Schobert – 3 Harpsichord Quartets, Op. 7

== Opera ==
- Florian Leopold Gassmann – L'Olimpiade
- Christoph Willibald Gluck – La rencontre imprévue
- Pietro Guglielmi – Siroe re di Persia
- Andrea Luchesi – L'Isola della Fortuna
- Pierre-Alexandre Monsigny – Rose et Colas
- Niccolò Piccinni – Gli stravaganti
- Johann Adolph Hasse – Egeria

== Methods and theory writings ==
- Daniel Bayley – A New and Compleat Introduction to the Grounds and Rules of Musick
- L'Abbé Duval – Principes de la musique pratique
- Jean-Philippe Rameau – Traité des accords et de leur succession selon le système de la Basse-fondamentale
- Valentin Roeser – Essai d'instruction à l'usage de ceux qui composent pour la clarinette et le cor
- Francisco Inácio Solano – Nova instrucção musical, ou theorica pratica da musica rythmica

== Births ==
- January 13 – Franz Lauska, Moravian pianist, composer and teacher (died 1825)
- March 1 – Jeremiah Ingalls, composer of the First New England School (died 1838)
- March 2 – Hélène de Montgeroult, composer and pianist (died 1836)
- May 15 – Johann Nepomuk Kalcher, composer (died 1827)
- September 11 – Valentino Fioravanti, composer (died 1837)
- October 21 – János Bihari, Hungarian Romani violinist (died 1827)
- November 30 – Franz Xaver Gerl, composer (died 1827)
- unknown date
  - Alexander Campbell, musician and writer (died 1824)
  - Vincenzo Fabrizi, composer
- probable
  - Bernard Lorenziti, French composer (died after 1815)
  - Jan Šťastný, cellist and composer (died c.1830)

== Deaths ==
- March 30 – Pietro Locatelli, violinist and composer (born 1695)
- April 17
  - Johann Balthasar Christian Freislich, composer (born 1687)
  - Johann Mattheson, German musicologist (born 1681)
- buried June 6 – Wilhelm Hieronymus Pachelbel, German composer, son of Johann Pachelbel (born c.1686)
- September 10 – Giovanni Antonio Giay, composer (born 1690)
- September 12 – Jean-Philippe Rameau, composer (born 1683)
- October 22 – Jean-Marie Leclair, composer (born 1697; murdered)
- October 23 – Pierre-Charles Roy, librettist and poet (born 1683)
- date unknown
  - Josep Mir i Llussà, Catalan composer and maestro de capilla (born 1700)
  - Lorenzo Zavateri, violinist and composer (born 1690)
