= Symphony No. 28 (Haydn) =

Symphony in four movements by Joseph Haydn

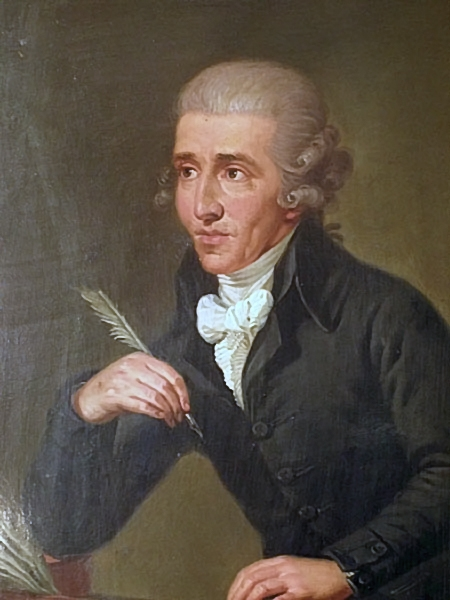
Portrait of Joseph Haydn by Ludwig Guttenbrunn, from c. 1770

Joseph Haydn's Symphony No. 28 in A major, Hoboken I/28, was written in 1765.

== Composition ==
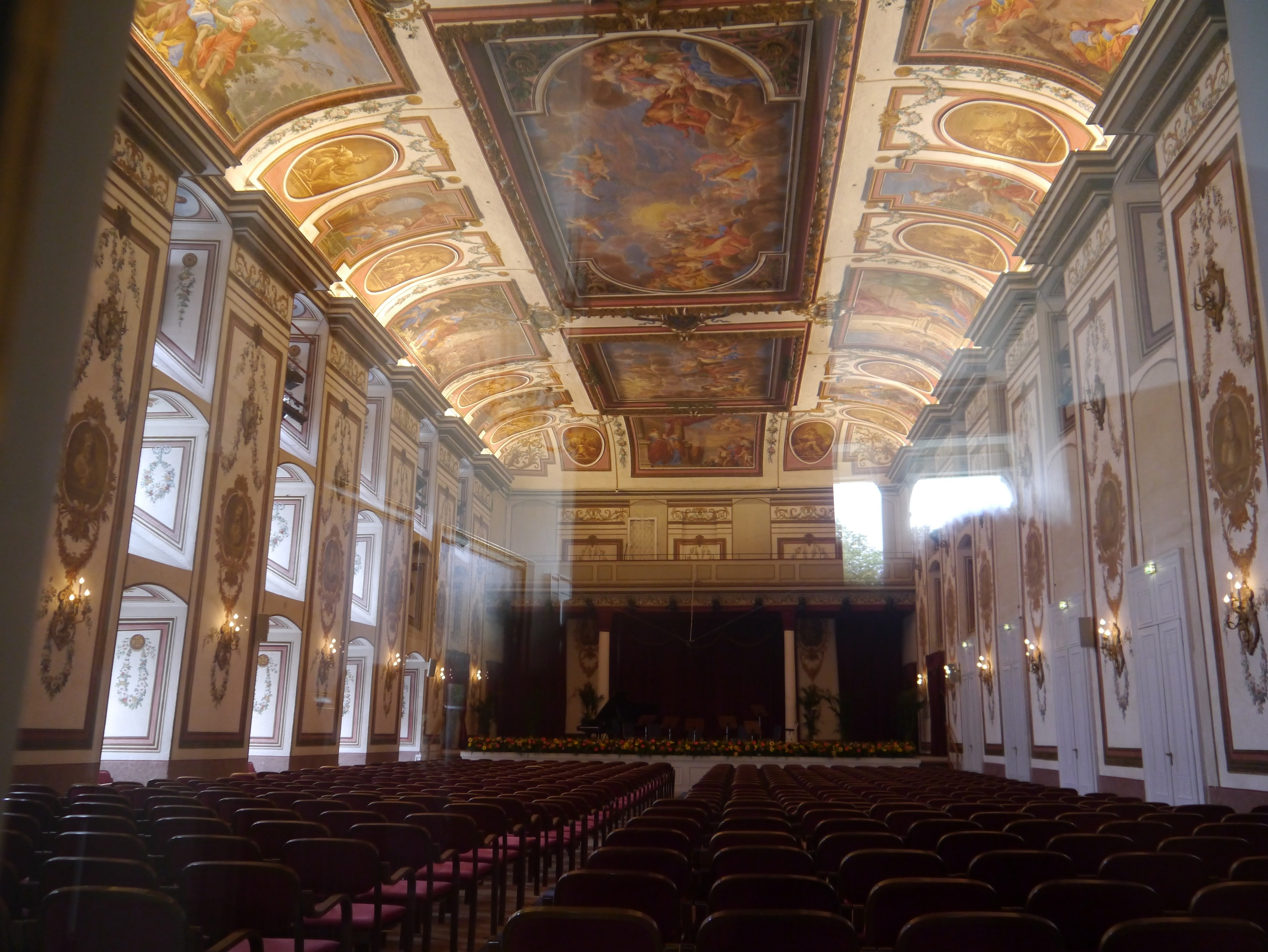
The Haydnsaal at the Esterházy palace in Eisenstadt, conjectured to be the site of the first performances

When Haydn wrote the symphony, he was about 33 years old and had been working since 1761 as Vice-Kapellmeister (assistant music director) at the court of the princely Esterhazy family, centered on their palaces in Vienna and Eisenstadt. Haydn's job was to cover secular music, in particular the directorship of the house orchestra. At the time, his patron Prince, Nikolaus I, had not yet discovered his two main musical obsessions, firstly playing the baryton and later putting on opera productions, so Haydn was able to channel much of his time for composition into symphonies, which were appearing at a rate of about four per year (Jones 1989). Jones suggests that the premiere of the 28th Symphony took place at the Eisenstadt palace, in what is today called the Haydnsaal, before the Prince and his guests (who may have been outnumbered by the orchestra). The players were the ensemble of courtly employees, some of them eminent performers, who served as Haydn's laboratory as he continued to explore the potential of the classical symphony.

The autograph of the work survives (though missing the final movement) and is kept in the University Library of Tübingen. Atop the first page, Haydn wrote: "Sinfonia / in nomine Domini/ dal Giuseppe Haydn 1765". The work was published by Bailleux in Paris in 1766–1767 (Wheelock 1982:40) as part of a set six symphonies, five of them by Haydn.

== Music ==
The symphony is scored for two oboes, bassoon, two horns, and strings,

It is in four movements:

1. Allegro di molto, 3/4
2. Poco adagio in D major, 2/4
3. Menuetto e Trio (Trio in A minor), 3/4
4. Presto assai, 6/8

Of the symphony as a whole, the critic Richard Wigmore (n.d.) writes: "No. 28 is a quirky piece, even by the standards of this experimental period."

=== I. Allegro di molto ===
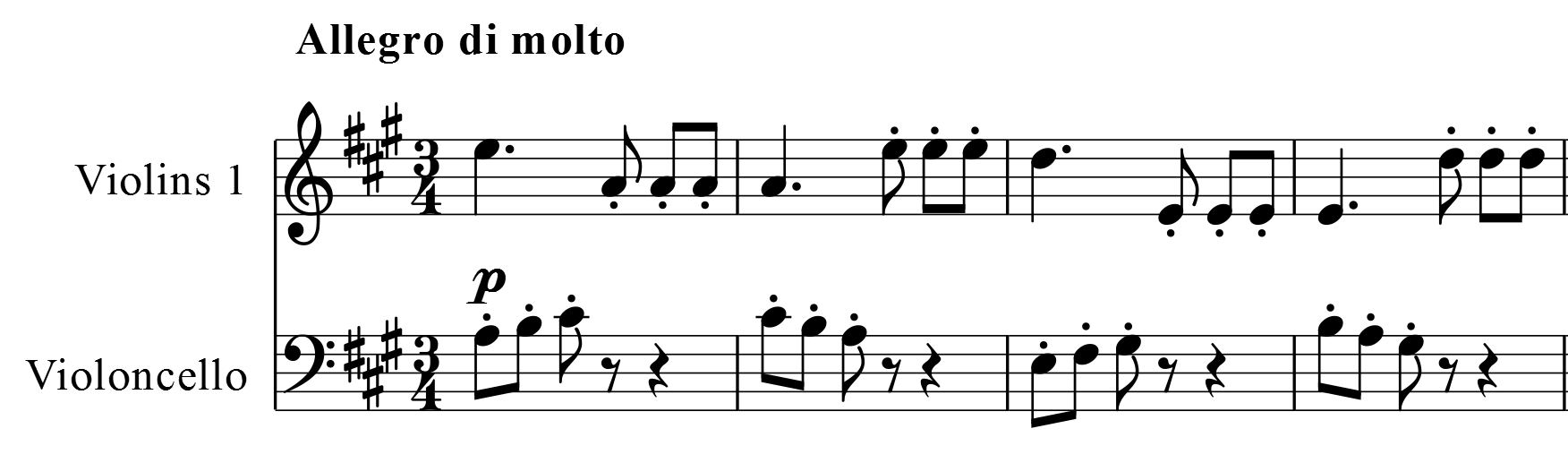

This movement is an early example of Haydn's practice of using minimal thematic resources to compose a sonata-form movement. Jones writes:

One of the features that distinguishes Haydn, even in this comparatively early stage of his career, from Ordonez, Gassmann, Dittersdorf and other contemporaries is his ability to create a focussed material argument with the minimum of material. At the end of his life the composer told his biographer, Griesinger: 'Once I had seized upon an idea, my whole endeavour was to develop and sustain it in keeping with the rules of art.' The first movement [of this symphony] provides a perfect early example of Haydn's approach: hardly a bar in the movement does not feature the four-note anacrusic figure [i.e., a four-note motif with three upbeats] heard at the beginning.

The rhythm of the movement is highly ambiguous; it is prone to being heard by the listener as being in 6/8 time rather than 3/4, like this:

The musician Gary D. Lloyd hears the opening as clearly in 6/8, and expresses delight in the movement's rhythmic ambiguity. That the piece is readily heard in 6/8 is indicated by a rare error from the eminent musicologist James Webster, who in program notes for the work (Webster 1999) listed it as being in 6/8.

Wigmore (2009:109) expresses both points just noted somewhat differently, calling the movement "a claustrophobically concentrated piece, permeated by a four-note 'hammering' motif that initially keeps us guessing at whether it is in 6/8 or 3/4 time. Bricks from little straw indeed."

=== II. Poco adagio ===
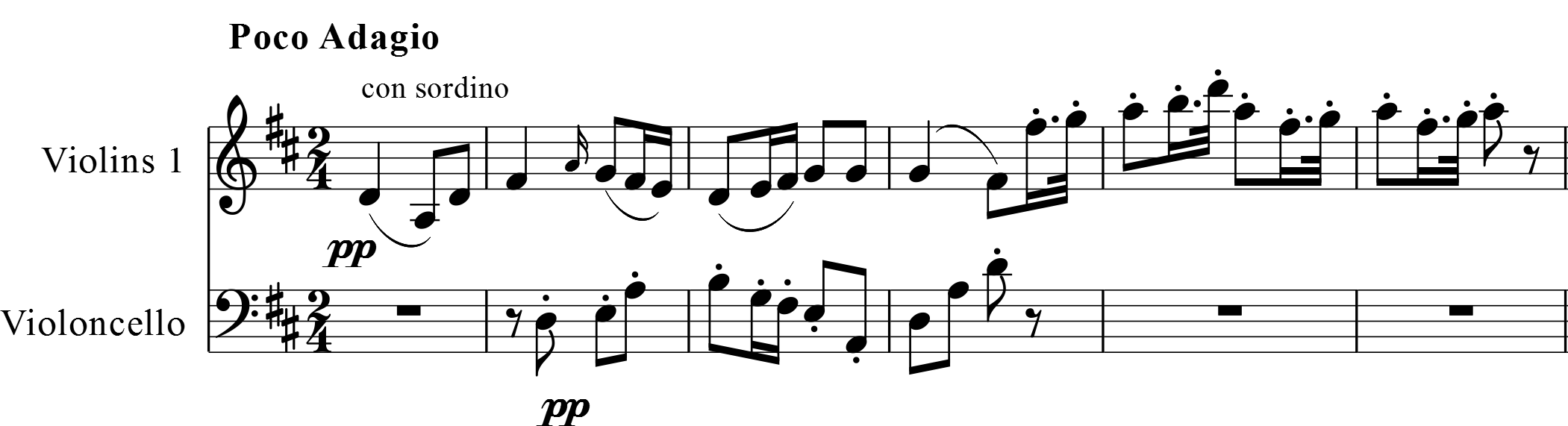

The slow movement features muted strings (the oboes and horns are silent) and contrasts legato passages with dotted staccato sections that anticipate the slow movements of symphonies 60 and 65 where the juxtaposition of the two styles is more stark.

Wigmore (n.d.) writes, "the second [movement], with its comically intrusive little staccato phrases, suggests some programmatic idea." Ten years later, with the 60th Symphony, Haydn did indeed write a symphony of program music, based on his incidental music for the comedy Der Zerstreute, "The Distracted Man".

=== III. Menuetto e Trio ===
This movement is in the standard form for the third movement of a classical symphony: a minuet in two sections, each repeated; then a trio in two sections, each repeated; lastly the minuet is played again da capo.

The minuet features unison bariolage, where the same note is heard played in rapid alternation on different strings. Most often this is done by alternating a fingered note on a lower string with an open upper string, introducing a piquant tone. Haydn later used unison bariolage in the finale of the "Farewell" symphony and throughout the finale of the quartet Opus 50, no. 6, where the effect gave rise to the quartet's nickname, "The Frog". In the opening of the movement, the bariolage passage is played by the combined first and second violins.

The fast tempo marking "Allegro molto" appears only one other time on a minuet in the Haydn symphonies, the much later Symphony No. 94 (1791).

Wigmore (2009) calls the a-minor trio section "glumly obsessive"; elsewhere (n.d.) "mysterious, mesmeric". The opening eight bars appear thus in the first violin part:

The music uses a narrow pitch range and is repetitive in pattern. Historically, Haydn scholars (e.g. Pohl, Hadow, Robbins Landon) have regarded this as an effort by Haydn to convey the character of folk music, either Roma ("gypsy") or Croatian; see Haydn and folk music. However, Ferraguto (2010) notes that in the case of this particular work, such comments are entirely speculative. He suggests instead that the trio may reflect a trend in Haydn's compositions at the time to experiment with passages composed in "minimalist" style; not in the modern sense of the term, but meaning employing minimal musical resources.

The second section of the trio has a rhythmic oddity remarked on by Ferraguto. The melody line is as follows:

The first eight bars constitute what would be a normal eight-bar middle section in minuet form; they end on a typical dominant cadence, with a V chord, and the normal continuation would be to go back to the opening notes of the trio. Yet the seventh and eight bars happen to be identical to the opening of the trio, and Haydn treats them as such: the remaining six bars simply continue the music of the first part to the end. Ferraguto describe the pattern thus (p. 63): "the entire eight-bar opening phrase is recapitulated verbatim, but starting two bars early ... [the "overlapping" bars] may be considered functionally multivalent."

=== IV. Presto assai ===
Jones writes, "The last movement is a hectic 6/8 scamper." Haydn augments the already very fast tempo marking presto with assai, "very".

== Assessment ==
The symphony called forth a quite hostile review in Haydn's own time from the Leipzig critic Johann Adam Hiller, who wrote "A local composer has recently put [the symphony] into a more bearable form and eliminated its abuses; the last movement, in 6/8 meter, is left out entirely in the print[ed edition]; would that instead he had suppressed the silly trio, together with the minuet." (Hiller did like the first movement somewhat better, calling it "a thoroughly charming little Allegro".) At this time of this career Haydn often was taken to task by critics from northern Germany, a matter he mentioned with vexation in his 1776 Autobiographical sketch.

At present, there are listeners who appreciate the symphony very strongly. Webster says "This wonderful work ... has justifiably been called 'the apotheosis of the Austrian chamber symphony'" (without identifying the writer). Gary Lloyd, quoted above, calls it "one of the best symphonies I’ve ever heard in my life." On the other hand, web attestations of the work appearing on concert programs are rare, and it seems to have been recorded for the most part only in the context of "complete works" editions of all the Haydn symphonies.

== Sources ==
- Ferraguto, Mark (March 2010). "Haydn as 'Minimalist': Rethinking Exoticism in the Trios of the 1760s and 1770s". Studia Musicologica. 51 (1/2): 61–77. JSTOR 25746240.
- Jones, David Wyn (1989) Program notes to Volume 4 of a series of recordings of Haydn symphonies made by Christopher Hogwood and the Academy of Ancient Music, issued by Oiseau-Lyre Records.
- Webster, James (1999) Program notes for a recording of the symphony made by John Hsu with the Apollo Ensemble, issued by Centaur Records.
- Wheelock, Gretchen (1982) Haydn's ingenious jesting with art : contexts of musical wit and humor. New York: Schirmer.
- Wigmore, Richard (2009) Haydn. London: Faber and Faber.
- Wigmore, Richard (no date). Review of a recording of this symphony by the European Union Chamber Orchestra, online at the web site of Gramophone; .
