= Symphony No. 60 (Haydn) =

Symphony in six movements by Joseph Haydn

- Il Distratto or Der Zerstreute
- by Joseph Haydn
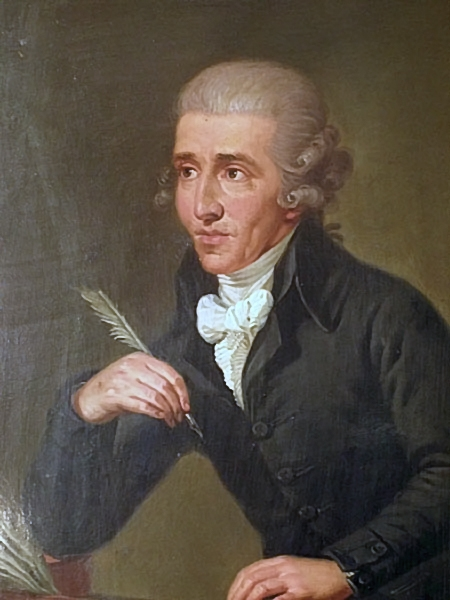
- Portrait of Joseph Haydn, ca. 1770
- Key: C major
- Catalogue: Hob. I:60
- Composed: 1775
- Duration: c. 25 minutes
- Movements: 6
- Scoring: Orchestra

The Symphony No. 60 in C major, Hoboken I/60, was written by Joseph Haydn. It is sometimes given the nickname Il Distratto or, in German, Der Zerstreute.

== Nickname ==
The symphony was adapted from incidental music that Haydn composed in 1774 for a German-language performance at Eszterház of a comedy by the French playwright Jean-François Regnard called Le Distrait (The Absent-Minded Gentleman). Written in 1697, the play was revived by Karl Wahr’s touring company under the German title Der Zerstreute. (Il Distratto is the Italian translation and the title that appears on Haydn's incidental music.)

The comedy—about a man so absent-minded that he nearly forgets his own wedding—was evidently perfect material for Haydn’s wit and humour, and his music was an instant hit. The Pressburger Zeitung, the leading regional newspaper, wrote on July 6th 1774 of the “original music which connoisseurs consider to be a masterpiece. One observes, here in a vein of musical comedy, the same spirit that enlivens all Haydn’s works. To the admiration of connoisseurs and the sheer delight of listeners, he displays masterly variety, switching from the most affected pomposity to low humour, so that H[aydn] and Regnard vie with one another as to who is the more capriciously absent-minded.“

Another performance on 22 November in Pressburg itself (now Bratislava, Slovakia) elicited another rave review from the same newspaper:

On Tuesday, St Cecilia’s Day, Der Zerstreute was played. Herr von [sic] Haydn has written singular music for it, with which our readers have already been acquainted by articles from Eszterház published in earlier numbers. Here we will only remind them that it is excellent, quite excellent, and that the finale had to be repeated, since the audience would not stop clapping. In that same movement, the allusion to the absent-minded gentleman who had forgotten on his wedding day that he was the groom, and therefore had to tie a knot in his handkerchief, is extremely well done. The musicians begin the piece most pompously and remember only after a while that their instruments have not been tuned.

The incidental music fizzes with invention and hilarity and mixes an array of musical styles ranging from stately Baroque to a movement described by the great Haydn scholar H. C. Robbins Landon as “a medley of Balkan folk tunes”. Its success ensured that Haydn was quick to adapt it as a six-movement symphony, perhaps as early as 1775. Symphony No. 60 contains the overture, four entr'actes and finale from the music composed for the five-act play.

== Music ==
The symphony is scored for two oboes, bassoon, two French horns, two optional trumpets, timpani, and strings.

It has six movements:

1. Adagio, 2/4 – Allegro di molto, 3/4
2. Andante, 2/4 in G major
3. Menuetto – Trio, 3/4 (Trio in C minor)
4. Presto, 2/4 in C minor and C major
5. Adagio (di Lamentatione), 2/4 in F major
6. Finale: Prestissimo, 2/4

The slow introduction to the first movement overture opens with a fanfare similar to the one that opens the 50th symphony which also served as an overture to a stage work. The ensuing Allegro is in sonata form. The second theme has a section that is notably marked perdendosi ("dying away") which Sisman associates with the absent-mindedness of the main character of the play. In the development section, the falling arpeggio motif that opens the Farewell Symphony is quoted and repeated at different pitches. According to Giovanni Antonini, a conductor who has recorded the symphony, this quotation is Haydn portraying the orchestra performing the incorrect composition due to distraction.

The slow movement features an alternation between a lyrical string motif and an oboe/horn fanfare. From a theatrical standpoint, this suggests a dialogue between two characters in the play—a well-bred young lady and a carousing soldier—but Haydn had also juxtaposed these types of themes in the slow movements of his 28th and 65th symphonies. The development section contains a parody of a French folk dance.

The courtly and pompous minuet is contrasted by the reappearance of the absent-minded main character in the trio, which features an exotically wandering, rising and falling motif over a bagpipe-like drone.

The fifth movement (adagio) briefly introduces timpani and trumpets, not to be found again in a Haydn symphonic slow movement until Symphony No. 88.

The finale features one of Haydn's famous musical jokes: the energetic prestissimo opening grinds to a sudden halt following a spectacularly discordant orchestral flourish, as the violins discover that they seemingly "need" to retune their strings—which they noisily proceed to do for 10 to 15 seconds before they resume playing.

== Critical commentaries ==
The conductor Kenneth Woods describes it as "the funniest and most modern work" on his list of top twenty C-major symphonies, and "possibly the funniest and most modern symphony ever written", going on to say that "Haydn uses most of the 20th-century 'isms' in this piece—surrealism, absurdism, modernism, poly-stylism, and hops effortlessly between tightly integrated symphonic argument and rapid-fire cinematic jump-cutting. This is Haydn at his absolute boldest—he undermines every expectation, and re-examines every possible assumption about music."

== See also ==
- List of symphonies by name
