= Haydn's name =

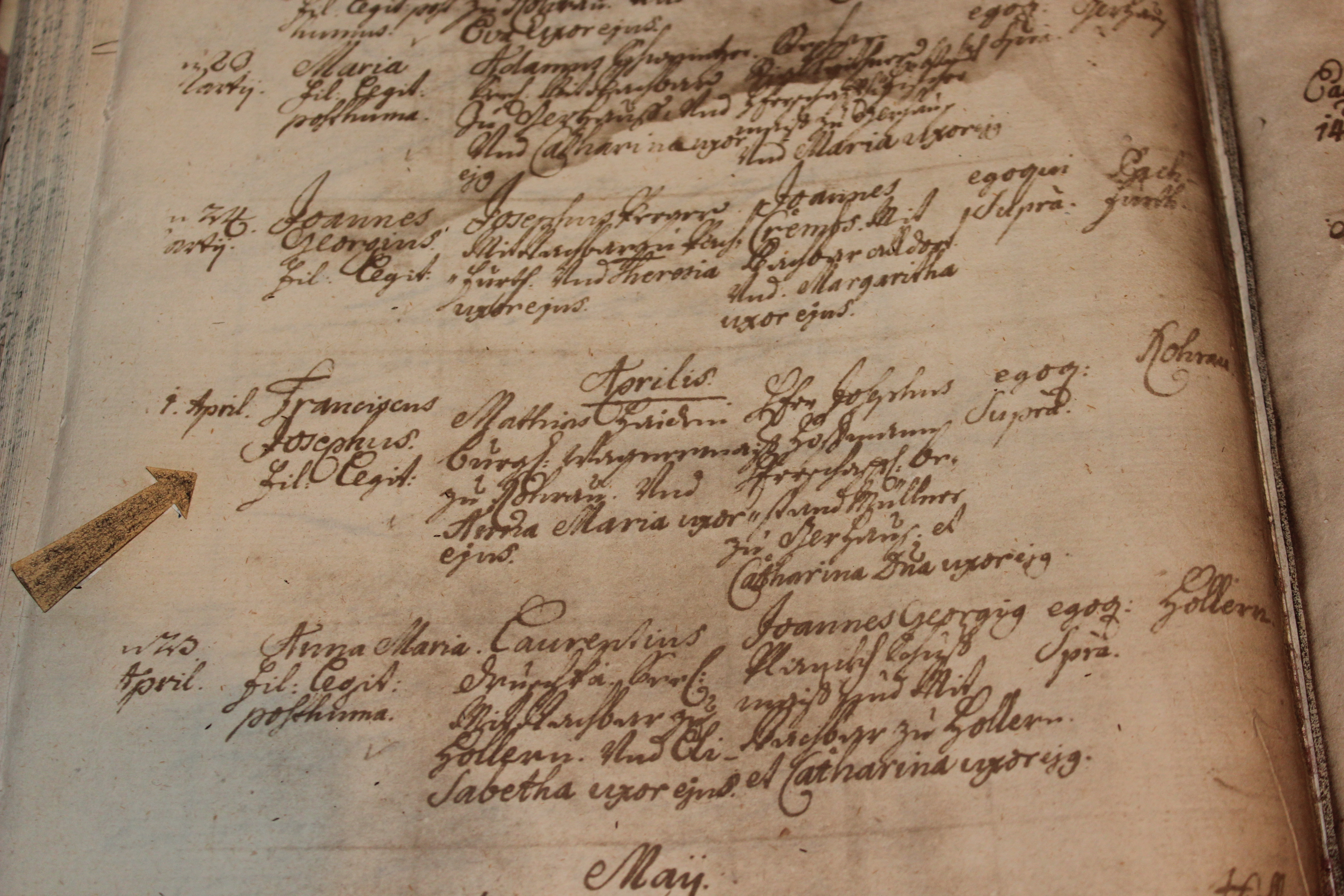
Haydn's birth register (click to enlarge)

The name of the composer Joseph Haydn had many forms, following customs of naming prevalent in his time.

== Baptismal names and the use of "Franz" ==
Haydn was baptized shortly after his birth, on 1 April 1732. The baptismal record indicates that he was given the names Franciscus Josephus; these are Latinized versions of the German names Franz Joseph, often used today to refer to Haydn.

Both Franz and Joseph are names of saints whose saint's days fell close to Haydn's birth date. The choice of such saint's names followed the common practice of Roman Catholicism (the parents' religion) in Haydn's time. Franz designates the saint Francis of Paola, whose saint's day is 2 April, and Joseph designates Joseph the husband of Mary, whose saint's day is 19 March.

In later life, Haydn "hardly ever" used the name Franz. Jones explains the situation thus: "As was frequently the practice in Austria, Haydn's parents gave their children two Christian names, the second of which was routinely used."

== Foreign-language versions of "Joseph" ==
Haydn's signature on a musical work, in Italian and using the Italian version of his name: di me giuseppe Haydn, "by me Joseph Haydn".

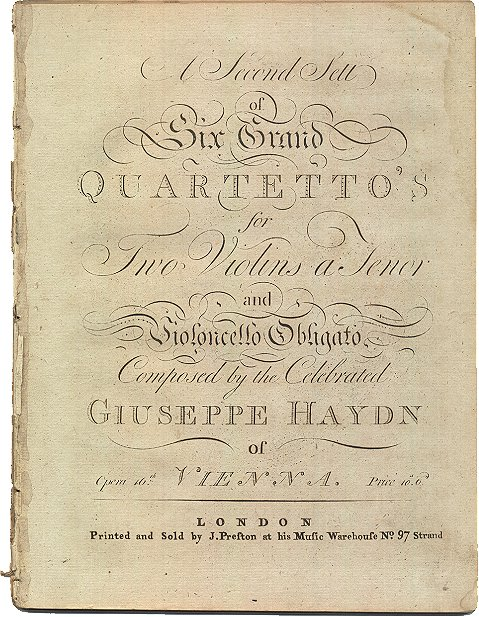
The English first edition of Haydn's string quartets Opus 20, with "Giuseppe"

Although Haydn sometimes called himself "Joseph Haydn", he also used two foreign-language versions of his name. On legal documents and letters, he often used the Latinized version "Josephus"; an example is his Autobiographical sketch. However, according to Jones, the version of his name that Haydn most often used (particularly in musical contexts, such as his signature on compositions), was "Giuseppe", Italian for "Joseph". Haydn was himself a fluent speaker of Italian (since in his employment he worked constantly with musicians from Italy) and evidently felt that Italian as the "language of music" was the appropriate choice for rendering his name in this context.

== Childhood ==
As a child Haydn was addressed with a diminutive form of his name, Sepperl. This form employs the Bavarian German diminutive suffix -erl, seen elsewhere, for instance, in the childhood name of Mozart's sister Nannerl. The base form Sepp likely originates in an infantile pronunciation of the second syllable of Joseph, or perhaps due to influence from the Italian equivalent of Joseph, Giuseppe.

== Modern usage ==
Contemporary practice by English-language writers concerning Haydn's name varies, particularly in the (ahistorical) use of his first name. Some commercial sources, for example on recordings and published scores, employ Franz Joseph Haydn. Other publishers, and most scholarly researchers, follow Haydn's own practice and omit the "Franz". Haydn scholar James Webster, in the opening of his article on Haydn in the New Grove, goes so far as to encourage his readers to drop the "Franz": "Neither [Haydn] nor his contemporaries used the name Franz, and there is no reason to do so today."

The patterns of English usage can be observed in the reports of the Google Ngram Viewer, which analyzes a large corpus of books, matches particular sequences of characters and gives the results on a year-by-year basis. According to the Ngram Viewer counts, "Franz Joseph Haydn" was not used in English-language books at all before about 1860, but since then it has undergone a gentle ascent and is to this day a solid minority choice, though still falling well behind the most frequent usage, "Joseph Haydn".

English-language authors also occasionally use "Josef Haydn" (with or without "Franz"). The spelling of "Joseph" with an f was not found in Haydn's day but is an adaptation of "Joseph" to what is now the normal spelling for this name in German. The change within German to "Josef" can be seen in the Ngram Viewer data for German-language books, where "Josef Haydn" starts to appear only around 1860, long after Haydn's lifetime (indeed, according to the same source, the spelling "Josef" as applied to any person is largely a post-1860 development).

Even in German-language works, "Josef" is still a minority choice in referring to the composer, as authors tend to favor the historical spelling. For German books "Josef" peaked around the end of World War II and plunged to a low but steady level shortly thereafter.

== See also ==
- Papa Haydn
