= Jean-Baptiste Morin (composer) =

French composer

Jean-Baptiste Morin (2 February 1677 – 27 April 1745) was a French composer and the Ordinaire de la Musique to Philippe, Duke of Orléans before and perhaps during his regency. From 1719 to 1731 Morin was Maître de musique of Louise Adélaïde d'Orléans, daughter of the Duke, at the royal abbey of Chelles, near Paris.

== Career ==
Morin was born in Orléans, Orléanais. He penned numerous works, including most famously a set of cantatas (published between 1706 and 1712). These provided a fusion of a French with the Italian style then popular at the Regent's court. Morin noted in the preface to the 1706 edition his efforts "to retain the sweetness of the French style of melody, but with greater variety in the accompaniments, and employing those tempos and modulations characteristic of the Italian cantata." Morin dedicated the volume to his royal sponsor.

He also published two famous books of (petits) Motets (1704, 2nd edition 1748; 1709) and a Processional for Chelles (1726).

His divertissement La Chasse du cerf (October 1707; libretto of his friend and protector, Jean de Serré de Rieux (at the time: François-Joseph de Seré, seigneur de Rieux, near Beauvais), Parisian parliamentary, poet and "grand amateur de musique") provides the hunting call motif that Haydn later employed in his Symphony No. 73. Morin died in Paris in 1745 (not 1754: see his "Inventaire après décès" in Paris, Archives nationales).

== Bibliography ==
- Pierre Dole: Jean-Baptiste Morin et la genèse de la cantate française, M.A. thesis, Paris-IV-Sorbonne (1989).
- François Turellier: Jean-Baptiste Morin, compositeur français (1677–1745), Diss., Paris-IV-Sorbonne (1999).
- James R. Anthony: French Baroque Music from Beaujoyeulx to Rameau
