= Symphony No. 22 (Haydn) =

Musical work by Joseph Haydn, composed in 1794

- Philosopher
- by Joseph Haydn
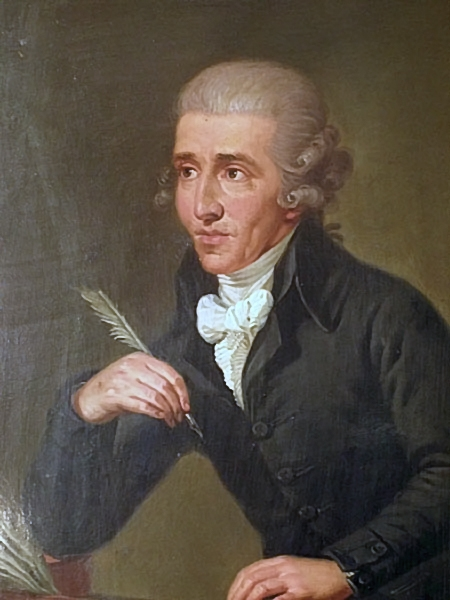
- Portrait of Joseph Haydn, ca. 1770
- Key: E♭ major
- Catalogue: Hob. I:22
- Composed: 1764
- Duration: About 20 minutes
- Movements: 4
- Scoring: Orchestra

Symphony No. 22 in E♭ major, Hoboken I/22, is a symphony written by Joseph Haydn in 1764 for his employer Prince Nikolaus Esterházy. Its nickname is The Philosopher (German "Der Philosoph").

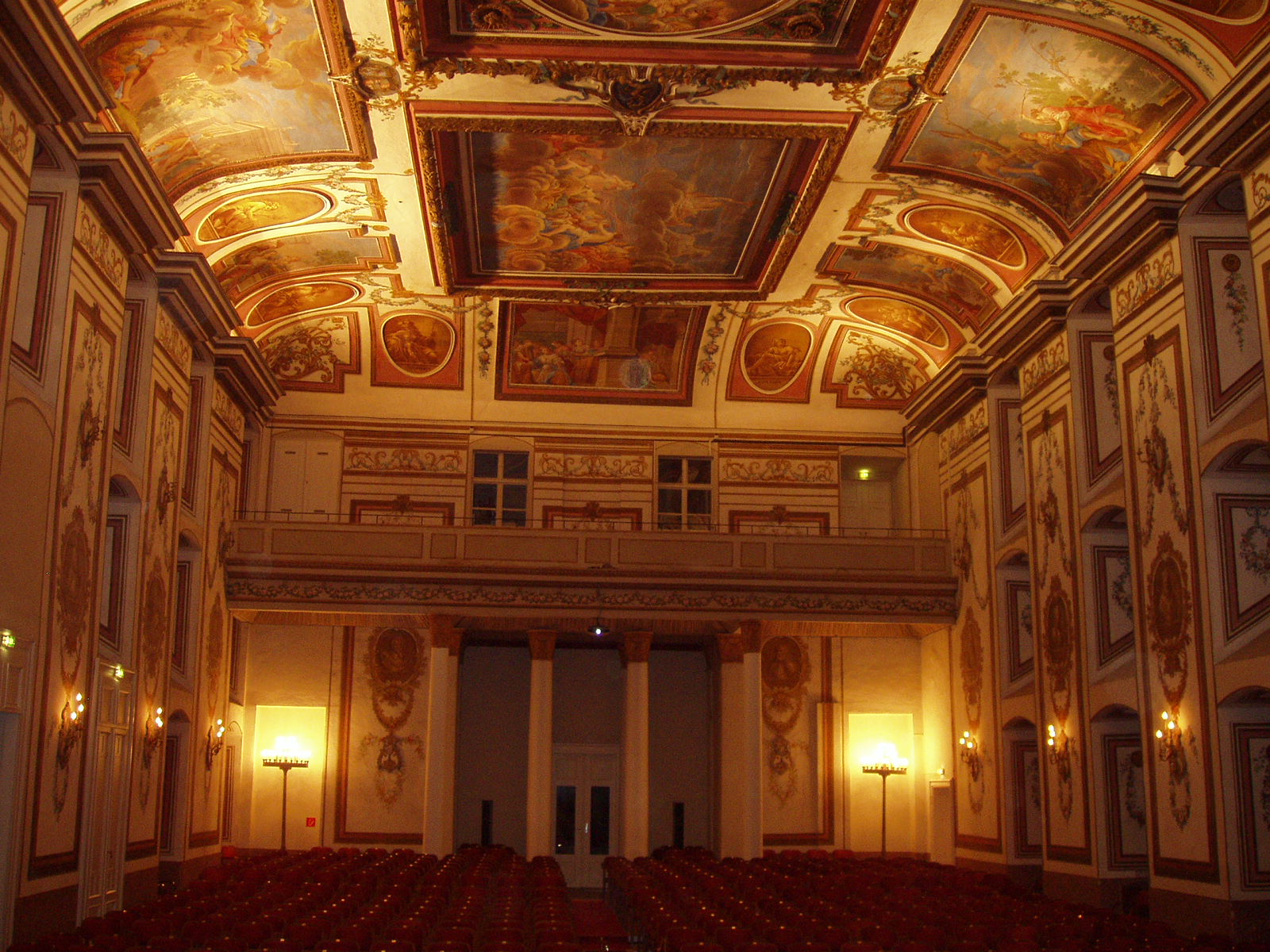
The Haydnsaal in Eisenstadt

== Composition and premiere ==
The composition date of 1764 appears on the autograph manuscript, which survives. Haydn composed the work during his tenure as Vice-Kapellmeister at the court of Prince Nicolaus Esterházy. As Vice-Kapellmeister Haydn was in charge of all but religious music in the Esterházy household; in particular he was the leader of the orchestra and was expected to compose symphonies for it to perform. This ensemble numbered about fifteen players. The intended audience (except on special occasions such as the Prince's name day) consisted only of the Prince and his guests; thus "very often Haydn's orchestra would have outnumbered the listeners." (Jones 1990:18).

Jones suggests that the first performance venue may have been what is today called the "Haydnsaal", a large hall at the family palace in Eisenstadt "having a very resonant acoustic". Other candidates were somewhat smaller halls in the other primary Esterházy palaces, at Vienna and Kittsee.

=== The nickname "The Philosopher" ===
The nickname ("the Philosopher") is not on the original manuscript and is unlikely to have come from Haydn himself. "Le Philosoph" appears on a manuscript copy of the symphony found in Modena dated 1790; thus the nickname dates from the composer's own lifetime. The title is thought to derive from the melody and counterpoint of the first movement (between the horns and cor anglais), which musically allude to a question followed by an answer and paralleling the disputatio system of debate. The piece's use of a muted tick-tock effect also evokes the image of a philosopher deep in thought while time passes by. As Jones notes, the nickname "becomes less appropriate as the symphony proceeds and earnestness gives way to high spirits."

== Scoring ==
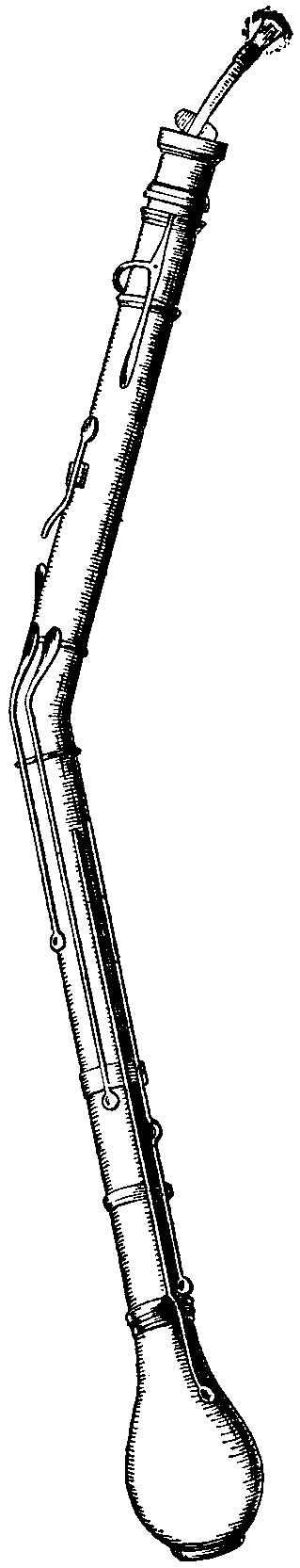
A historical cor anglais

The work is scored for two cors anglais (English horns), two horns, strings, and basso continuo. The use of the cor anglais in place of the (related, but higher-pitched) oboe is more than unusual; indeed McVeigh (2009:386) suggests that it is "the only symphony in the entire history of the genre to use this scoring". The horns play a prominent role in all but the second movement, and Haydn's choice of E♭ major may have been dictated by the fact that the valveless horns of the time sounded best when played as E♭ instruments (that is, with E♭ crooks inserted).

== Form ==
The symphony is in four movements:

1. Adagio,
2. Presto,
3. Menuetto e Trio, 3/4
4. Finale: Presto, 6/8

This slow-fast-slow-fast sequence of tempos corresponds to the sonata da chiesa of the Baroque era, although the musical language of the piece is classical. As with other early Haydn symphonies that use this tempo scheme, all of the movements are in the same key. The first, second, and fourth movements are in sonata form and the third is the customary minuet and trio in ternary form.

The first movement is the highlight of the symphony and features horns answered by cors anglais over a walking bass line. The violins play with mutes. H. C. Robbins Landon calls it "surely one of the settecento's supremely original concepts". Played with all the indicated repeats, it lasts about 10 minutes, almost half the duration of the symphony as a whole.

The second movement is extroverted, in very fast tempo, and features virtuosic playing from the string section. As commentators have pointed out, this movement would be too fast and light to begin a classical symphony on its own, but fits well after a slow opening movement. Later in Haydn's symphonic career, the same effect would be achieved by placing a light opening theme after a slow introduction.

As McVeigh notes, the opening theme of the third movement echoes that of the first, resembling an extended rendition of it in minuet tempo. The trio section features writing in the high register for the two horns.

The conductor Graham Abbott describes the last movement as "a dazzling virtuoso piece for every player in the ensemble." It is one of the earliest examples of a "hunting finale" that would later be used in symphonies such as No. 65 and No. 73 "La Chasse".

== Second version ==
Another version of the piece, well known in Haydn's time, was published by the Venier firm in Paris. This version has three movements with the second movement of the original version coming first, followed by a different movement that is marked andante grazioso in 3/8 and concluding with the same finale as in the original version. The second movement (catalogued as H. I:22bis) is thought to be spurious, and arrangement as a whole not Haydn's own. H. C. Robbins Landon suggests that this arrangement was likely made to the original composition due to the "strangely original" adagio and the existence of cors anglais, which were not available in many areas. It is precisely these elements that make this symphony so popular, so this version is seldom performed in modern times.

== See also ==
- List of symphonies by name
