= String Quartets, Op. 20 (Haydn) =

Six string quartets by Joseph Haydn

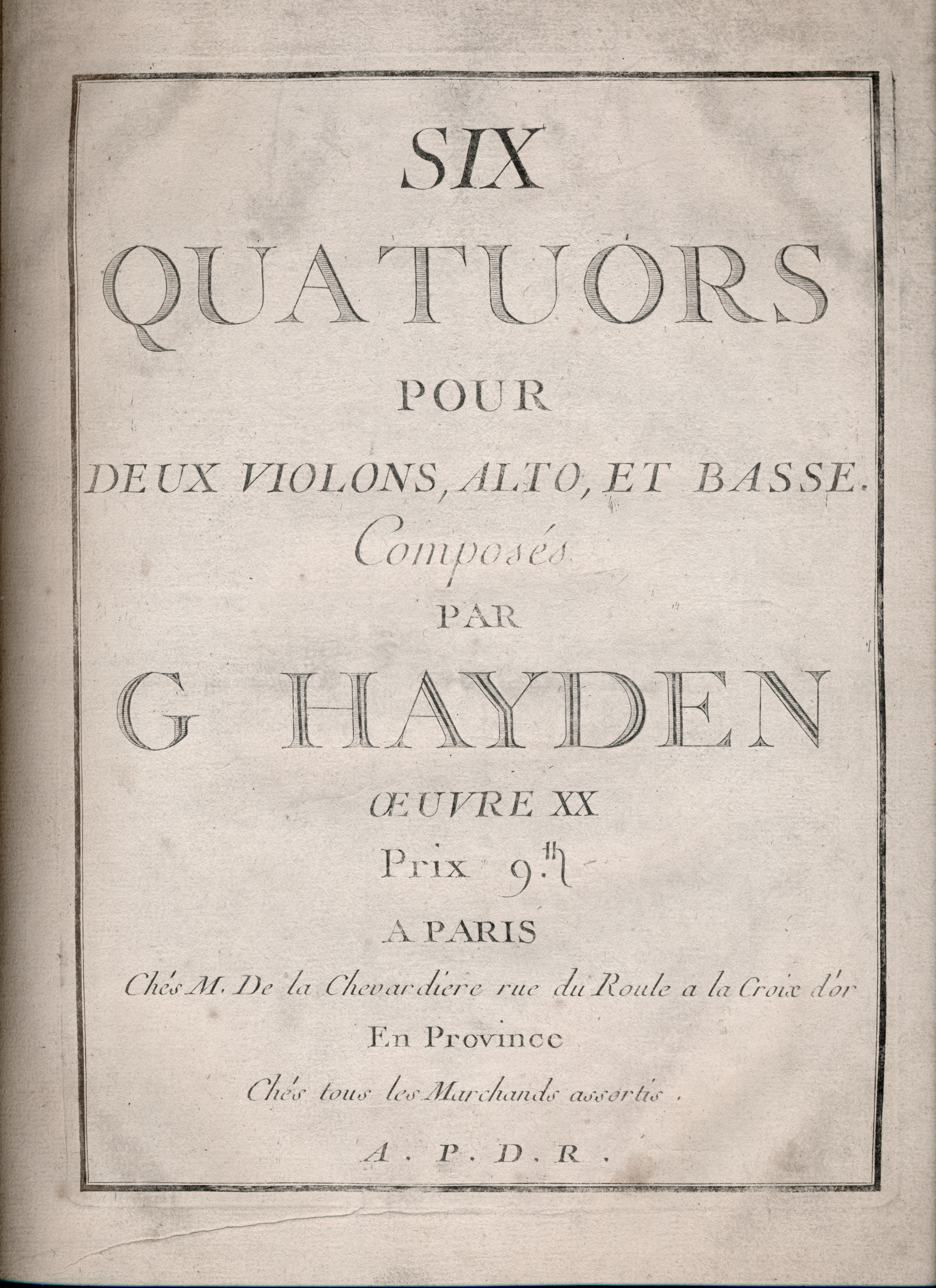
Haydn Op. 20 violin I title page published 1774 by Chevardière in Paris (first edition)

The six string quartets Op. 20 by Joseph Haydn are among the works that earned Haydn the sobriquet "the father of the string quartet". The quartets are considered a milestone in the history of composition; in them, Haydn develops compositional techniques that were to define the medium for the next 200 years.

The quartets were composed in 1772 at a time of tensions in Haydn's life, and also when Haydn was influenced by new philosophical and political ideas sweeping Europe. Some analysts see the impact of these emotions and ideas on the quartets.

== The quartets ==
The set of quartets, along with their incipits are shown below in order of Haydn's own catalog [Entwurf-Katalog].

=== No. 1 in E♭ major ===
1. Allegro moderato
2. Minuetto: Allegretto
3. Affettuoso e sostenuto
4. Finale: Presto

=== No. 2 in C major ===
1. Moderato
2. Adagio
3. Minuetto: Allegretto
4. Fuga a quattro soggetti

=== No. 3 in G minor ===
1. Allegro con spirito
2. Minuetto: Allegretto
3. Poco adagio
4. Finale: Allegro di molto

=== No. 4 in D major ===
1. Allegro di molto
2. Un poco adagio e affettuoso
3. Allegretto alla zingarese
4. Presto scherzando

=== No. 5 in F minor ===
1. Allegro moderato
2. Minuetto
3. Adagio
4. Finale: Fuga a due soggetti

=== No. 6 in A major ===
1. Allegro di molto e scherzando
2. Adagio, cantabile
3. Minuetto: Allegretto
4. Fuga a tre soggetti. Allegro

== Composition ==
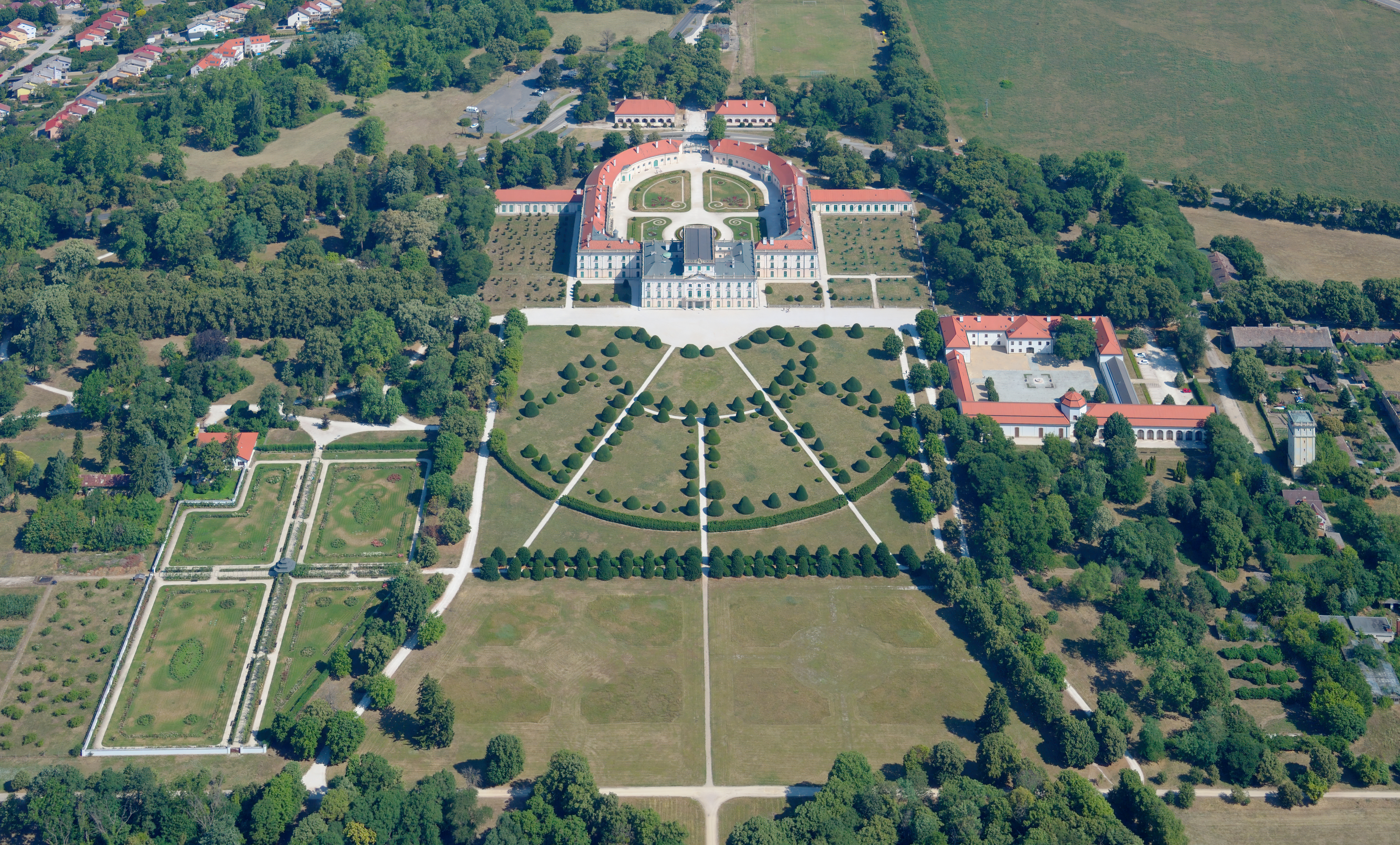
Aerial photograph of Eszterháza

Haydn was 40 years old when he composed the opus 20 quartets and was already well-established as one of the leading composers of Europe. He was Kapellmeister to the Prince Nikolaus Esterházy, a great lover of music. Haydn presided over the busy musical life of the court, producing operas, oratorios, and symphonic and chamber concerts, and writing a steady stream of new music for the prince's amusement.

Nikolaus had eight years prior to this date built the Eszterháza palace southeast of Vienna (in Hungary), where the court resided for most of the year. While the palace itself was one of the most splendid in Austria, and was dubbed the "Hungarian Versailles", it was built over a large swamp; it was humid throughout the year, with a "vexatious, penetrating north wind" from which Haydn and the other musicians in the court suffered. Moreover, it was far from Vienna, and the musicians (Haydn, as Kapellmeister, excepted) had to leave their wives and families behind for many months. Consequently, there was much discontent among the musicians, and Haydn, like the others, suffered from bouts of depression and illness.

This atmosphere found its expression in the opus 20 quartets. "The designation affettuoso found twice in the directions for the tempo of slow movements can be applied to the whole opus", writes Geiringer. Haydn chooses minor keys for two of the quartets, unusual in a time when the minor was rarely used for this ensemble. In particular, the fifth quartet is in the unusual key of F minor, "a key that predisposes even Haydn to sombre thoughts", writes Cobbett.

But the sodden air of Eszterháza was not the only influence on the emotional character of the quartets. It was a time of ferment: new ideas that were to spur the Romantic movement in another 30 years were taking root. Philosopher Jean-Jacques Rousseau expounded a philosophy of human freedom and a return to nature. Poets Johann Wolfgang von Goethe and Friedrich Schiller espoused the new Sturm und Drang movement, that "exalted nature, feeling, and human individualism and sought to overthrow the Enlightenment cult of Rationalism". For Haydn, this meant the rejection of the galante style, the courtly, simplified, somewhat slender musical style prevalent at the time.

Minuet of Op. 20, no. 4, alla zingarese

Analysts trace specific musical choices in the Opus 20 quartets to these new ideas. For example, the minuet movement of the D major quartet (number 4) is replaced by a frenetic gypsy air titled "alla zingarese", full of offbeat rhythms. "Rousseau's 'back to nature' movement resulted in a general reawakening of interest in national folk music. Haydn showed himself in complete sympathy with this tendency", writes Geiringer. Three of the six quartets have fugues as finales. Counterpoint, the densely complex style of the Baroque, had fallen out of favor with the galante composers. "To emphasize his rejection of rococo lightness, Haydn reverted to Baroque features", writes Geiringer.

The opus 20 quartets were the third set of quartets Haydn wrote at Eszterháza. His dedication to the string quartet form is something of a mystery; there is no record of a string quartet concert performed at the palace during this period. The set became known as the "Sun" quartets, because of the picture of a rising sun that graced the cover of an early edition The first known publication of the quartets was in 1774 by Louis-Balthazar de La Chevardière in Paris and later (undated, probably in the 1780s or 1790s) by Artaria in Vienna. The most commonly used Urtext edition is by Eulenburg, published in the 1880s.

== Opus 20 and the development of the string quartet ==
=== Assessment by music historians ===
When Haydn published his opus 33 quartets, ten years after the opus 20, he wrote that they were composed in "an entirely new and particular manner". But, if the opus 33 was the culmination of a process, opus 20 was the proving ground. In this set of quartets, Haydn defined the nature of the string quartet – the special interplay of instruments that Goethe called "four rational people conversing". Many of the compositional techniques used by composers of string quartets to the present day were tried out and perfected in these works.

"This cannot be overstated", writes Ron Drummond; "the six string quartets of Opus 20 are as important in the history of music, and had as radically a transforming effect on the very field of musical possibility itself, as Beethoven's Third Symphony would 33 years later". And Sir Donald Tovey writes of the quartets, "Every page of the six quartets of Op. 20 is of historic and aesthetic importance... there is perhaps no single or sextuple opus in the history of instrumental music which has achieved so much".

The musicologist Roger Hickman has demurred from this consensus view. He notes a change in string quartet writing towards the end of the 1760s, featuring characteristics which are to day thought of as essential to the genre - scoring for two violins, viola and cello, solo passages, and absence of actual or potential basso continuo accompaniment. Noting that at this time other composers were writing works conforming to these 'modern' criteria, and that Haydn's earlier quartets did not meet them, he suggests that "one casualty [of such a perspective] is the notion that Haydn "invented" the string quartet...Although he may still be considered the "father" of the "Classical" string quartet, he is not the creator of the string quartet genre itself...This old and otiose myth not only misrepresents the achievements of other excellent composers, but also distorts the character and qualities of Haydn's opp. 1, 2 and 9".

The musicologist Cliff Eisen contextualizes the op. 20 quartets as follows: "Haydn's quartets of the late 1760s and early 1770s [opp. 9, 17 and 20] are high points in the early history of the quartet. Characterized by a wide range of textures, frequent asymmetries and theatrical gestures...these quartets established the genre's four-movement form, its larger dimensions, and ...its greater aesthetic pretensions and expressive range."

Some of the innovations of Haydn's op. 20 quartets, as stated by Tovey and others, are as follows:

=== Use of counterpoint ===
Fugal finale of opus 20 number 5.

The fugal finales of three of the six quartets are Haydn's statement of rejection of the galante. Not only has Haydn rejected the freedom of the rococo style, he has emphasized that rejection by adhering to strict formality and writing comments into the score explaining the fugal structure. "Al rovescio" he writes at one point in the last movement of quartet number two, where the fugal melody is played in inversion. "In canone" he writes in the finale of number 5. The finale of number six is a "Fuga a 3 Soggetti" (a fugue with three fugal subjects).

The fugal finales are not mere formalism, however; Haydn clothes them in a dramatic structure suitable for the Sturm und Drang. All three movements start out sotto voce; as the fugue develops formally, the tension mounts, but Haydn does not increase the volume, until a sudden, startling burst of forte. "Haydn has, in the quartets of opus 20, a hint of the emotional and dramatic impulse which became so volcanic in Beethoven's fugues", writes Donald Tovey.

Haydn's fugal finales are not the only use of counterpoint in these quartets. Haydn revives Baroque compositional techniques in other movements as well. The opening of the second quartet is essentially contrapuntal, with the viola and the second violins playing countersubjects to the cello's principal melodic line. Haydn also uses more obscure techniques; in the adagio movement of the fifth quartet, for example, he writes at one point "per figuram retardationis", meaning that the melodic line in the first violin lags behind the harmonic changes in the accompaniment. "Enormous importance lies in these fugues", writes Tovey. "Besides achieving in themselves the violent reconquest of the ancient kingdom of polyphony for the string quartet, they effectively establish fugue texture from henceforth as a normal resource of sonata style".

=== Equality of voices ===
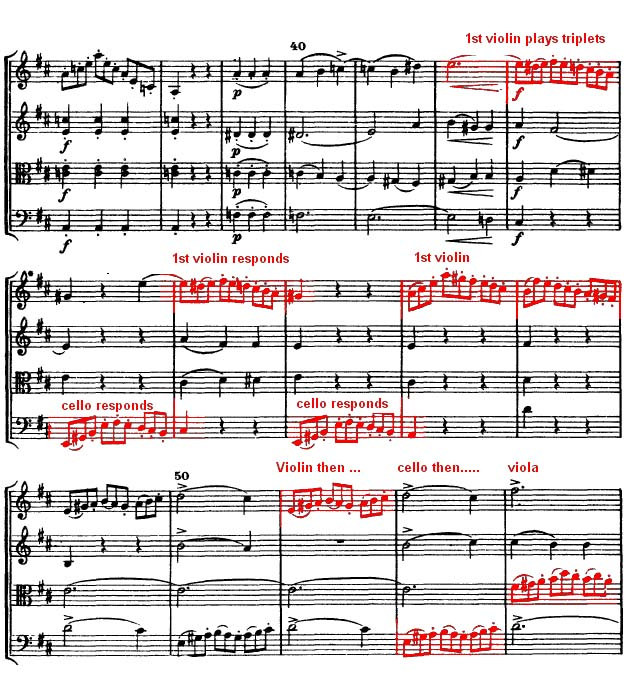
Section of No. 4 showing interplay between the first violin and cello

Prior to opus 20, the first violin, or, sometimes, the two violins, dominated the quartet. The melody was carried by the leader, with the lower voices (viola and cello) accompanying. In opus 20, Haydn gives each instrument, and particularly the cello, its own voice. An outstanding example of this is the second quartet in C major. The quartet opens with a cello solo, accompanied by the viola and second violin. Another example is in the slow movement of the fourth quartet, in D major. This movement is a set of variations, written in D minor; the first variation is a duet between viola and second violin, and the third variation is a solo for cello.

According to Tovey, much of this equality of voices is achieved through the use of counterpoint. Fugue texture "is a most important resource as a type of instrumentation. Obviously it solves the problem of equality in quartet-writing by a drastic return to Nature, and puts the four instruments where the voices were when all harmony was counterpoint." However, some scholars argue by pointing to earlier works such as the Opus 5 string quartets (1756) of Franz Xaver Richter, Haydn was not the first to achieve such "equality of voices" in string quartets.

=== Structural innovations ===
With the opus 20 quartets, Haydn moved forward the development of the sonata form. A movement written in sonata form has an exposition, where the themes and motifs of the movement are presented; a development section, where these themes are transformed; and a recapitulation, where the themes are restated. Traditionally, the restatement closely matched the original exposition. But Haydn, in opus 20, uses the restatement to further develop the material of the movement. For example, in the F minor quartet, Haydn embellishes the original theme, and rearranges the original material, adding to the musical tension as the movement moves to the coda. In the G minor quartet, the recapitulation is hardly a recapitulation at all; while all the original materials are included, they are rearranged and transformed.

There are other structural innovations in opus 20. Haydn develops the idea of "false reprise". In the fourth quartet, in D major, for example, Haydn sneaks into the recapitulation of the first movement, treating it dramatically as though it is a continuation of the development. Haydn also experiments with cyclical structure: the reuse of thematic and rhythmic materials in different movements, to give an overall unity to the piece.

=== Depth of expression ===
Haydn experiments with expressive techniques in the quartets. An example of this is the G minor quartet, where Haydn defies the standard practice of ending each movement with a cadence played forte. Instead, Haydn ends each movement piano or pianissimo. Another example is the F minor quartet; this quartet, writes Tovey, "is the most nearly tragic work Haydn ever wrote; its first movement being of astonishing depth of thought".

=== Length and symmetry of phrases ===
Minuet of opus 20 number 3. The phrase is five measures long.

Haydn experiments with asymmetrical phrases and syncopations. The common practice of the time was to write melodies that divided neatly into four- and eight-measure chunks. But the opening phrase of the third quartet, in G minor, is seven measures long, and the minuet of the same quartet has a melody that is divided into two phrases of five measures each.

Indeed, in opus 20, most of the minuet movements are minuets in name only. The minuet was a court dance, through-choreographed, built of four groups of four measures in 3/4 time. The minuets of opus 20, with the exception of numbers 1 and 6, would be impossible to dance to, as they do not have this formal structure. The minuet of the second quartet in C major is built of tied suspensions in the first violin, viola and cello, so that the listener loses all sense of downbeat. The fourth quartet has the off-beat alla zingarese movement. The minuet of the fifth quartet has a first section of 18 measures, divided asymmetrically. So far did Haydn stray from the formal minuet dance structure, that in his next set of quartets, opus 33, he did not call them minuets at all, but rather scherzos.

== Structure of the quartets ==
=== No. 1 in E♭ major ===
Second theme of the first movement of opus 20 number 1. The theme is stated by the cello.

While the first movement is in straightforward sonata-allegro form, Haydn nonetheless breaks with the standard quartet model of the period. The second theme of the exposition is presented by the cello, rather than the violin, playing in a high register above the viola accompaniment. Haydn also disguises the return to the recapitulation after the development section of the movement: after only three bars of development, Haydn returns to the theme in the tonic, suggesting the beginning of the recapitulation; but instead, deviates into a series of transpositions, finally sneaking back to the main theme when least expected. Haydn uses this trick of a pretended recapitulation in other opus 20 quartets.

Third movement of opus 20 number 1, marked Affetuoso e sostenuto

The second movement is a minuet, one of two from the set that follow all the rules of the traditional dance (the other is the minuet of number 6). The third movement is marked "Affettuoso e sostenuto", written in A♭ major as an aria, with the first violin carrying the melody throughout. The finale, marked presto, is built on a six-measure phrase, with extensive use of syncopations in the first violin. In the middle of the movement there is an extended passage where the first violin plays syncopations and the other instruments are playing on the second beat of the 2/4 bar; no one plays on the downbeat, and toward the end of the passage the listener loses track of the meter, until the main theme returns.

=== No. 2 in C major ===
In this quartet, Haydn develops the equal interplay between the instruments, the quartet conversation. The first movement opens with a cello solo, playing above the accompanying instruments. In the course of the movement every instrument gets to play the solo – even the viola, who, "besides having a vote in the parliament of four... for once [is heard by Haydn] as he hears the cantabile of the 'cello", writes Tovey. The movement is markedly chromatic; the development ranges from C major, to A major, dipping into D major, A minor, F major, and even A♭ major.

Second movement of opus 20 number 2

The second movement opens with a bold unisono, then the cello states the theme. It is an emotionally charged movement, with dramatic shifts from pianissimo to forte, mixed with cantabile passages with a sextuplet accompaniment in the viola.

Minuet movement of opus 20 number 2. The pedal tones recall the sound of a bagpipe.

The minuet, like others in the set, defies choreography. In the opening section, all the instruments are tied across the barline, so the sense of downbeat dissipates. The effect recalls the sound of a musette de cour, or other type of bagpipe. This movement, too, is very chromatic, with the melody of the second section built on a descending chromatic scale in the first violin.

Finale of opus 20 number 2. Haydn wrote over this passage, "Sic fugit amicus amicum" (Thus one friend flees another).

The finale is a fugue with four subjects. Haydn marks the opening sempre sotto voce. The fugue ripples along in an undertone, through various learned fugal maneuvers – a stretto, al rovescio. The texture gradually thins so that only two voices are playing at once, when suddenly the fugue bursts into forte and cascades of sixteenth notes lead to the close of the quartet. In the autograph edition, Haydn wrote over this passage, "Laus. Omnip. Deo. Sic fugit amicus amicum" (Praise the Lord. Thus one friend flees another friend).

=== No. 3 in G minor ===
"This quartet is among the more enigmatic pieces in the repertory", writes William Drabkin. "Indeed, the work is in so many respects unusual that it seems in places to defy interpretation".

Opening of Opus 20 number 3. The phrase is seven measures long.

The enigma begins with the opening theme of the first movement: built of two phrases of seven measures each, it defies the galante practice of carefully balanced four- and eight-measure phrases. It is almost as if Haydn was wagging his tongue at his contemporaries, violating accepted shibboleths of composition. "Haydn's compositional freedom seems often defiantly at odds with what textbooks have to say", writes Drabkin. For example, Haydn inserts brief unisono passages in the major key, as a kind of exclamation mark; but, where such passages would normally be played forte, he has marked them piano for a surprisingly different effect.

An unisono passage in the development section of the first movement of opus 20 number 3, played piano

Haydn continues the odd phrase structure in the minuet, which is built of five-measure units. Aside from its undanceable meter, the minuet is a sombre work, emphatically minor in character. The trio section of the minuet offers a brief respite with a first strain in E♭ major; but the second strain returns to the minor, modulating down through several minor keys. The trio ends with a plagal cadence to G major, for a Baroque-like Picardy third conclusion; but then the minuet recapitulates in G minor. The move from G major back to G minor is so jolting that Drabkin speculates that the trio might possibly have been borrowed from another piece.

The third movement, marked Poco Adagio, is a long cantabile aria in G major, dominated by the first violin and the cello. After the first violin states the theme, the cello takes over with a long rippling line of sixteenth notes. The movement includes a haunting solo for cello (bars 70-83), unusual in Haydn's quartets, and in quartet writing from that period in general.

Last movement of opus 20 number 3. The melodic line is frequently interrupted by breaks.

The finale is marked Allegro molto. Here, too, Haydn continues to defy accepted practice. Here Haydn makes dramatic use of silence; the opening four-bar theme breaks off suddenly for a half-measure pause. Such pauses recur throughout the movement, giving the movement "a mildly disruptive effect", according to Drabkin. In this movement, Haydn also makes a number of surprising harmonic progressions. He ends the piece in G major, surprisingly, with a descent from piano to pianissimo.

=== No. 4 in D major ===
If the third quartet of the set is the most obscure and difficult to understand, the fourth is the most popular. "... The D major quartet, opus 20 number 4, has met with more public recognition than the other five", writes Tovey.

The quartet opens with a quiet, almost hymn-like statement of the theme. Suddenly there is a burst of arpeggio in the first violin, lapsing immediately back to the quiet of the first motive. The juxtaposition of calm and vigor continues through the exposition, to the statement of the second theme, and a short codetta leading to the development. In the development section, Haydn repeatedly offers false reprises: After a section of development, he presents a dominant arpeggio leading back to the first theme. But this is not the reprise, the development goes on. Haydn does this again, and yet again, then sneaks back into the real reprise in a way that the listener does not notice. The movement ends, like several others of the opus 20, in pianissimo.

The first variation in the slow movement of opus 20 number 4. This is a concertante duet between second violin and viola.

The second movement, a set of variations in D minor, is one of Haydn's most profound, a rejection of the shallowness of the galante. "The poignant second movement Adagio moves the string quartet even farther from the concept of courtly entertainment", writes Miller. "In this wonderful movement, we have something of three centuries: the seventeenth century Baroque, the eighteenth century Classical, and the nineteenth century Romantic. Haydn's genius encompasses it all". The players take their turns in presenting the main musical line: the second violin and viola in the first variation, the cello in the second variation, and elsewhere the first violin. The fourth variation never completes the theme but transitions to a highly dramatic coda section with which the movement ends.

In the third movement, the Allegretto alla zingarese, the upper and lower voices play complex, interlocking cross-rhythms, confusing all sense of downbeat. Although the meter is in 3/4, the pulse is in two, with the strong beats of the upper voices alternating with the strong beats of the lower voices. The trio section of the movement is a cello solo, marching in perfectly regular 3/4 time, "the perfect foil to the Menuet alla zingarese".

The fourth movement continues the gypsy style of the third movement. Chromatic melodies, octave leaps, use of the gypsy scale (a minor scale with raised fourth and raised seventh), and flashy virtuoso embellishments in the first violin make this movement "sheer fun for the listener and likewise for the players", writes Miller. The movement ends in pianissimo, "an ending that simply evaporates".

=== No. 5 in F minor ===
This is the most emotionally intense of the opus 20 quartets. In the opening phrase, the violin sets the tone with a haunting melody. "Haydn, we might imagine, set out to test the limits of what the minor mode could express in this newly serious instrumental combination", writes Roger Parker. The music rolls out almost without interruption; instead of ending each phrase with a cadence before beginning a new phrase, Haydn runs the phrases together, the end of one being the beginning of the next. Throughout the first movement – and, indeed, for almost the entire quartet – the first violin leads with the concertante part. Even so, the texture is not galante, for the other parts play important and independent roles throughout. Haydn in the recapitulation continues developing the melody with new embellishments, and the coda wanders through strange modulations – D♭ major, G♭ minor – before returning to the plaintive F minor conclusion.

The minuet continues the sombre mood in F minor. The character of the minuet is as far from that of a courtly dance as can be imagined. Again, the structure of the minuet is irregular and undanceable. The trio section, in F major, offers a brief respite from the relentless minor, but even this section is subdued in tone.

Siciliana movement of Op. 20, No. 5, featuring a virtuosic first violin part embellishing the main theme

The slow movement is a Siciliana, in F major. The 6/8 theme cycles throughout the movement, constantly transforming itself, while the first violin plays a concertante descant, floating over the theme, sometimes capturing it, then leaving it again.

The finale is a fugue with two subjects. The main subject is a standard fugal motif, used frequently in the Baroque (it appears, among other places, in Handel's Messiah). While constructing a fugue in the strict, learned style, Haydn imbues the movement with an intense dramatic structure; like other fugues in the set, the entire first two thirds of the fugue is sotto voce. Out of this quiet the first violin suddenly erupts to a forte, only to fall back into another piano section. The texture thins and the tension descends, until a second burst of fortissimo, with first violin and cello playing the fugal subject in canon, leading to the dramatic finale.

=== No. 6 in A major ===
Themes of the opening movement and the minuet of Op. 20, No. 6. The similarity of the themes gives a unity to the whole quartet.

This, the last quartet as published, but the second of the series as Haydn conceived them, is the most conservative of the set. The quartet has the bright, optimistic character often associated with Haydn's music. The key is A major, a key that highlights the highest and brightest tones of the lead violin. Haydn has marked the first movement Allegro di molto e Scherzando. Yet, here, too, Haydn is trying out new ideas. Traditionally, the exposition proceeds from a first theme in the tonic key to a second theme in the dominant. In the first movement, Haydn indeed proceeds to the dominant key of E major, but then shifts to E minor for the second theme. But he stays in that key only half a measure, modulating to C major, then to D major, and on, shifting keys relentlessly until he comes back to the dominant E major.

The second movement, marked Adagio, is a variation on sonata form, modeled after a form developed by Haydn's contemporary, Carl Philipp Emanuel Bach. The violins dominate, with the first violin playing the melody over rippling sixteenth notes in the second, or the second carrying the melody, with the first playing embellishments.

Opening of the last movement of Op. 20, No. 6

The minuet is in strict danceable form. The theme of the minuet is a variation of the first theme of the first movement – one of the most explicit examples of cyclic form in Haydn's work.

The last movement is a fugue with three subjects. Like the other fugal finales in the set, this proceeds sempre sotto voce until nearly the end, when it breaks into forte. Unlike the other fugues, however, this has none of the Sturm und Drang drama about it, but is predominantly major and upbeat in character.

== Impact of the quartets ==
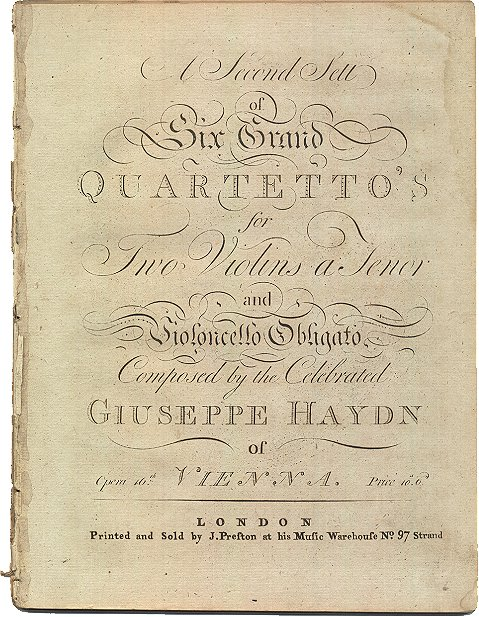
1782 edition of the Op. 20 quartets, published by Preston in London. The use of the Italian "Giuseppe" as Joseph Haydn's given name was normal; see Haydn's name.

The Op. 20 quartets transformed the way composers would write string quartets. "When we consider the poor condition" of string quartet writing prior to Haydn, writes C. Ferdinand Pohl, "... it is impossible to overrate his creative powers".

However, it is also disputed how much impact Joseph Haydn alone had on Wolfgang Amadeus Mozart in string ensemble works. Euna Na points out by examining works composed by Michael Haydn in 1773 (MH 187, MH 188, MH 189), that in string ensemble works, Mozart shares far more linguistic elements such as chromatic harmony and theatrical gestures with Michael Haydn; "Wolfgang seems to have been influenced earlier and more directly by Michael than by Joseph". Striking examples of linguistic similarity are found in the slow movements of Michael's MH 367 and Mozart's K. 465, for example. Professor David Wyn Jones at the Cardiff University School of Music states that "in Salzburg, if not throughout his life, Mozart was writing in a lingua franca and many of the features of that language are to be found in Michael Haydn too".

Many other great composers acknowledged their debt to Haydn and to these quartets. Beethoven also recognized the importance of Haydn's work. Before embarking on his own first set of string quartets, Op. 18, Beethoven studied the scores of the Haydn Op. 20 quartets, copying them out and scoring the first for string orchestra. Throughout his life, Beethoven had a love-hate relationship with Haydn: Haydn was one of Beethoven's teachers, and Haydn's criticisms of his early compositions rankled the young composer to the day of the elder composer's death. Yet, in spite of the antagonism, Beethoven spoke of Haydn with reverence. "Do not rob Handel, Haydn and Mozart of their laurel wreaths", he wrote in a letter in 1812, three years after Haydn's death. "They are entitled to theirs, I am not yet entitled to mine".

Brahms was also a devotee of the Op. 20 quartets. Brahms owned the autograph manuscript of the quartets, studied them carefully and annotated them. He bequeathed the manuscript to the Society of Friends of Music in Vienna, where it is preserved today.

== See also ==
- List of string quartets by Joseph Haydn

== Bibliography ==
- Cobbett, Walter Willson (1929). Cobbett's Cyclopedic Survey of Chamber Music. London: Oxford University Press. (References are to the 2nd edition, published in 1963, with a new volume 3).
- Tovey, Sir Donald, "Haydn", in Cobbett's Cyclopedic Survey of Chamber Music (1929; 2nd edition, Oxford University Press, 1963); see vol. 1, pp. 515–545.
- Drabkin, William (2000). A Reader's Guide to Haydn's Early String Quartets. Greenwood Press. ISBN 0-313-30173-5.
- Geiringer, Karl (1982). Haydn: a Creative Life in Music. University of California Press. ISBN 0-520-04317-0.
- Miller, Lucy (2006). Adams to Zemlinsky. Concert Artists Guild. ISBN 978-1892862099.
- Pohl, C. Ferdinand, "Haydn", in Grove's Dictionary of Music and Musicians (1946)
- Robbins Landon, H. C.; Jones, David Wyn (1988). Haydn: His Life and Music. Thames and Hudson. ISBN 0-253-37265-8.
- Solomon, Maynard (1978). Beethoven. Granada Publishing, Limited. ISBN 0-586-05189-9.
- Stowell, Robin, ed. (2003). The Cambridge Companion to the String Quartet. Cambridge Companions to Music. Cambridge University Press. ISBN 0-521-80194-X.
