= Symphony No. 21 (Haydn) =

Symphony in four movements by Joseph Haydn

Joseph Haydn

The Symphony No. 21 in A major, Hoboken I/21, was composed by Joseph Haydn around the year 1764. The symphony’s movements have unusual structures that make their form hard to identify. The parts that pertain to sonata form are often hard to recognize immediately and are often identified “only in retrospect.”

== Movements ==
The symphony is in four movements and is scored for two oboes, two horns in A, and strings.

1. Adagio, 3/4
2. Presto, 4/4
3. Menuett and Trio (Trio in A minor), 3/4
4. Allegro molto, 4/4

=== I. Adagio ===
The entire first movement is in slow tempo, marked adagio. In Haydn's early career he would occasionally arrange the movements of a symphony in the manner of a Baroque church sonata, with the slow movement first; this is true, for instance, of symphonies no. 18 and 22, "The Philosopher". Later on, Haydn also might begin a first movement with a slow tempo, but only as an introduction, with the main body at a faster tempo.

The first movement has a structure that corresponds with no formal type, and sharply contrasts with Haydn’s usual style of structuring movements. Wigmore writes "Though it has the vague outlines of sonata form, this lovely movement sounds like a free fantasia on its gracious opening theme." The piece quickly reaches the dominant (m. 13), in which the opening ritornello is restated, but soon reverts to the tonic (m. 16). The dominant is suggested again in m. 26, but then segues into a development-like passage around mm. 29–41. However, it does not conclude with a cadence. Instead of a half cadence on dominant, the development ends with a V^{4}_{2}–I^{6} progression that does not return to the opening theme. The tonic key immediately returns with an authentic cadence soon afterwards (m. 48).

=== II. Presto ===
The second movement has a mirror recapitulation, that is the “opening material does not return at the beginning of the recapitulation, but is instead transplanted to the end as a coda.” This is unusual for both a work of Haydn’s and a symphony. Haydn does this because the opening statement (mm. 1–9) is played only in octaves instead of triads, a contrast with the rest of the piece. The next theme, beginning at m. 10, brings triads into the picture. The octave sonority does not return until the opening theme returns as the coda. As the material does not return in any form during the main body of the piece, the theme in octaves serves as an introduction to contrast with the rest of the movement.

As for the body of the movement, the exposition is made of two parts, not three: a tonic section (mm. 1–16) and a dominant section (m. 17–42). Yet, the half cadence that divides the two sections in the exposition does not appear in the recapitulation; m. 15–21 do not have corresponding measures in the recapitulation. This is because m. 17 corresponds with m. 10 but in the dominant. If m. 17 appeared in the recapitulation, it would be transposed into the tonic key, and therefore be a repetition violating sonata rules.

=== III. Menuett and Trio ===
The opening eight bars of the Menuett can be easily divided into antecedent and consequence respectively, ending on a half-cadence and an authentic cadence in tonic. The two phrases contrast sharply “in dynamics, in orchestration, in the rhythm of the accompaniment, and in the register of the upmost voice.” These eight bars, the Menuett’s A section, appear slightly altered at the very end of the menuett as its A′ section; the viola and violoncello e basso parts descend in the first two measures instead of coming in on the second measure and ascending.

In the Trio, the first two measures of the A section are immediately repeated, as happens in the second phrase as well. Mark Ferraguto has discussed Haydn's deliberate use of spare instrumental scoring and minimal melodic material in the trio of this symphony.

The first eight notes of the menuett were used verbatim to start the minuet of Mozart's Eine Kleine Nachtmusik (K. 525).

=== IV. Allegro molto ===
The fourth movement is a “binary variant of sonata form in which the opening eight measures of the exposition do not return in the recapitulation. The beginning theme does return (m. 41) before the recapitulation, but as the theme is now in dominant, it cannot be considered part of the recapitulation. The piece moves to dominant at m. 9 and remains so through m. 58. The recapitulation starts at m. 59 when the tonic returns, and mm. 9–40 are replayed in A major to close the symphony.
