= Symphony No. 24 (Haydn) =

Symphony in four movements by Joseph Haydn

Joseph Haydn

Joseph Haydn wrote Symphony No. 24 in D major, Hoboken I/24, in 1764. The symphony is scored for flute, two oboes, bassoon, two horns, and strings with continuo.

The work is in four movements:

1. Allegro, 4/4
2. Adagio in G major, 3/4
3. Menuet — Trio, 3/4d
4. Allegro, 4/4

The second movement very likely derives from the Adagio movement of a now lost Flute Concerto in D major, listed in Haydn's Entwurfkatalog. While there is no extant manuscript evidence for this, the movement is consistent with Haydn's lyrical and less formalist approach to slow movement writing in the concerto genre, including, most obviously, the elision of the opening ritornello and the inclusion of an obvious cadential point at the end of the movement. (This is also true of the slow movement of Haydn's Symphony No 13.)

In the final movement, Haydn again incorporates the same figure as seen in his Symphony No. 13 and Mozart's Jupiter Symphony.
