= Autobiographical sketch (Haydn) =

1776 document by Joseph Haydn

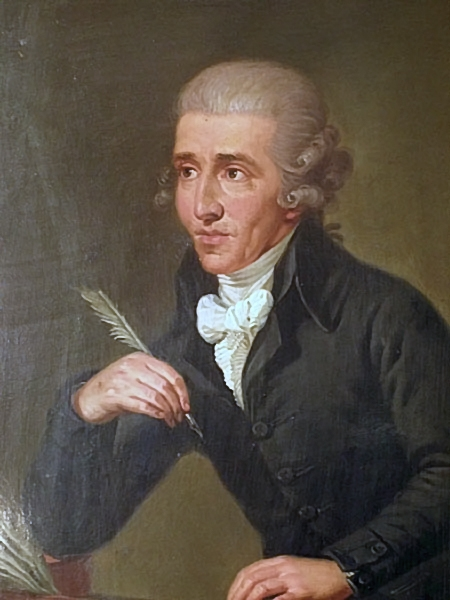
Haydn portrait by Ludwig Guttenbrunn

The Autobiographical sketch (1776) of Joseph Haydn is the only autobiographical document that was ever prepared by this composer. Haydn wrote the sketch, which is about two pages long, when he was 44. He was answering a request, relayed to him by a chain of two mutual acquaintances, from Ignaz de Luca, who was preparing a volume of brief biographies of Austrian luminaries, Das gelehrte Oesterreich ("Learned Austria"). The sketch was published in 1778, in Volume 1, Part 3 of that work.

== Content ==
The sketch begins with a brief account of the first 29 years of Haydn's life. He mentions his early home life in Rohrau, his early education in Hainburg, his subsequent career as a choirboy in Vienna, his struggles during eight years of freelance work and his appointments as Kapellmeister, first with Count Morzin and then with the hugely wealthy Esterházy family.

Having related his rise to career success, Haydn says nothing at all of the years 1761 to 1776 that spent working in the Esterházy court, but he concludes his narrative with a declaration of loyalty to his employer:

I was engaged as... Capellmeister of His Highness the Prince Esterházy, in whose service I wish to live and die

Haydn held to his word: despite considerable tedium and loneliness when his employer required him to live in isolated Esterháza, he remained in official service to Prince Esterházy and his heirs until his death, in 1809.

The sketch goes on to list what Haydn regarded as his most important works up to that time: the operas Le pescatrici, L'incontro improvviso, and L'infedelta delusa; his oratorio Il Ritorno di Tobia (1775) and his Stabat Mater (1767). All of them are vocal music; Haydn omits the pre-1776 instrumental works that arguably have received greater critical acclaim in modern times, such as the "Farewell" Symphony or the string quartets, Opus 20. Musicologist David Schroeder notes that "in the eighteenth century vocal music was considered pre-eminent. With opinion such as this as the common currency, it should not surprise us that Haydn... listed only vocal works among those he considered his finest." Jones (2009:80) makes the same point and goes on to say, "It was to take a further ten years or so for Haydn even to begin to realize that he had set a historical process in motion as a pre-eminent composer of instrumental music."

Haydn also offers an assessment of his then-current reputation as a composer, expressing appreciation for the praise and support of Johann Adolph Hasse, Carl Ditters von Dittersdorf and Gottfried van Swieten as well as considerable resentment directed at various (unnamed) critics in Berlin:

I have been fortunate enough to please almost all nations except the Berliners; this is shown by the public newspapers and letters addressed to me. I only wonder that the Berlin gentlemen, who are otherwise so reasonable, preserve no medium in their criticism of my music, for in one weekly paper they praise me to the skies, whilst in another they dash me sixty fathoms deep into the earth, and this without explaining why; I know very well why: because they are incapable of performing some of my works, and are too conceited to take the trouble to understand them properly.

The sketch concludes thus:

My highest ambition is only that all the world regard me as the honest man I am.

I offer all my praises to Almighty God, for I owe them to Him alone: my sole wish is to offend neither my neighbour, nor my gracious Prince, nor above all our merciful God.

== As rhetoric ==
The musicologist Elaine Sisman has offered a novel interpretation of the sketch as having been written, whether consciously or not, according to principles of rhetoric laid down in the Middle Ages. She notes that Haydn studied Latin as a schoolboy and that traditional Latin instruction would likely have included the principles of rhetoric. Sisman annotates the sections of Haydn's original letter as follows:

The sketch is a classic rhetorically organized composition, drawing particularly on the medieval ars dictaminis, the art of letter-writing: first an introduction (exordium), incorporating the so-called "securing of good-will" (benevolentiae captatio, in this case by self-deprecation); then the narration of facts (narratio, his biography); the supporting evidence (corraboratio, the list of pieces); the refutation of his enemies' arguments (confutatio, the Berlin critics); and the conclusion, revealing again his good qualities as well as those whom he admires and respects (peroratio).

== Versions ==
The document Haydn wrote was edited by the staff of Das gelehrte Oesterreich—in Jones's words -- "to make it suitable for a dictionary, preserving the factual content but also devitalising the human being who had supplied it." Modern reference sources tend to quote Haydn's own words, not the published version.
