= Bernardo Lorenziti =

Italian composer (c.1764–c.1813)

Bernardo Lorenziti (c. 1764 - after 1813) and his brother Antonio Lorenziti (Aix, c. 1740-1789) were two Italian musicians and composers, active mainly in France.

Bernardo was born in Kirchheim, Württemberg trained under his brother in Nancy, and for twenty-five years he was employed in the opera of Paris. He was second violinist in 1787, and pensioned in 1813. He wrote 240 works of music including concertos for violin and orchestra, viola and orchestra, trios for viola, bass, and violin; 12 variations for 2 violins and bass; 11 duos for violins, etudes, caprices, and airs varies for violin alone and violin and flute.

He wrote an elemental instruction method for playing violin.

Antonio Lorenziti studied under his father, who worked for the Prince of Orange, then under Pietro Locatelli. In 1767, he was appointed maestro di Capella for the Cathedral of Nancy, where he lived till he died. He composed many terzetti, quartetti, and concerti.
