= Josep Mir i Llussà =

Josep Mir i Llussà (Spanish José Mir y Llussá, also José Mir y Lusa) (c. 1700–1764) was a Catalan composer, and maestro de capilla at Segovia, then Valladolid and Madrid. His works are preserved in copies in the Royal Convent of La Encarnación and in archives in the Americas. Little is known about the life of Jose Mir y Llussa, but his pieces were often performed in private palaces along with those of Manuel Pla.

== Works, editions, and recordings ==
His surviving choral works include:

- Missa a 8 in D major
- Stabat Mater in G minor
- Quomodo obscuratum est
- Lauda Jerusalem - Psalm in A minor
