= Symphony No. 14 (Haydn) =

Symphony in four movements by Joseph Haydn

Joseph Haydn

Joseph Haydn's Symphony No. 14 in A major, Hoboken I/14, may have been written between 1761 and 1763. The symphony is scored for two oboes, bassoon, two horns, strings, and continuo. As was becoming more common for Haydn, this symphony has four movements:

1. Allegro molto, 3/4
2. Andante in D major, 2/4
3. Menuetto e Trio: Allegretto, with the Trio in A minor, both 3/4
4. Allegro, 6/8

The Andante was originally the finale of an early divertimento "Der Geburtstag" (en. "Birthday"), Hob. II/11. The variations of the divertimento are reworked into sonata form for the symphony.

The trio of the Minuet features an oboe solo accompanied by violins and cello.

The finale is highly contrapuntal and is based on a descending scale.
