= Carl Ferdinand Pohl =

German-Austrian music historian, archivist, and composer

Anton Carl Ferdinand Pohl (6 September 1819 – 28 April 1887) was a German-Austrian music historian, archivist, and composer.

Pohl was born in Darmstadt. He attended high school in his hometown and studied to be an engraver. At the same time he took music lessons with Christian Heinrich Rinck. In 1841 he went to Vienna and continued his education with Simon Sechter. From 1849 to 1855, he worked as an organist at the Protestant church in Gumpendorf. He then traveled. In 1866 he took over the post of archivist of the Gesellschaft der Musikfreunde in Vienna.

As a music writer, he produced books about Wolfgang Amadeus Mozart and Joseph Haydn. Among his friends was Johannes Brahms, whom he encouraged to compose the Haydn Variations (Op. 56).

He died in Vienna. His estate is located at the Gesellschaft der Musikfreunde.

== Selected writings ==
- Mozart und Haydn in London, 2 volumes, Vienna 1867 (Digitized version)
- "Simon Sechter," in Jahresbericht des Wiener Conservatoriums 1868
- Die Gesellschaft der Musikfreunde des Österreichischen Kaiserstaates und ihr Conservatorium, Vienna 1870 (Digitized version)
- Denkschrift aus Anlass des hundertjährigen Bestehens der Tonkünstler-Societät, Vienna 1871 (Digitized version)
- Joseph Haydn, 2 volumes, Leipzig 1878–1890 (second volume completed in 1890 by Eusebius Mandyczewski,
  - (third volume started and completed by Hugo Botstiber in 1927)
