= Symphony No. 65 (Haydn) =

1778 symphony by Joseph Haydn

Joseph Haydn

Symphony No. 65 in A major, Hoboken I/65, is a symphony by Joseph Haydn which was composed by 1778.

== Music ==
The symphony is scored for two oboes, two horns, and strings.

There are four movements:

1. Vivace e con spirito
2. Andante, 3/8
3. Menuetto and Trio
4. Finale: Presto, 12/8

The first movement starts with three declamatory chords at intervals of a rising fourth and a falling minor second followed by a lyrical answer which constitutes the first theme group. This section does not appear in the recapitulation causing some scholars to question if this movement is in sonata form as its form is closer to that of an Italian overture.

Scholars have theorized that the eccentric slow movement may have been conceived as incidental music to a play. Musicologist Elaine Sisman suggested that it may have been Shakespeare's Hamlet. The minuet is not dance music, as it is rhythmically complex. Haydn switches frequently between 3/4 and 4/4 meter. The minor-key trio also features metric complexity in the form of hemiolas. The finale is a hunting piece, similar to the finale to the 73rd symphony.
