= Symphony No. 73 (Haydn) =

Symphony in four movements by Joseph Haydn

- La chasse
- by Joseph Haydn
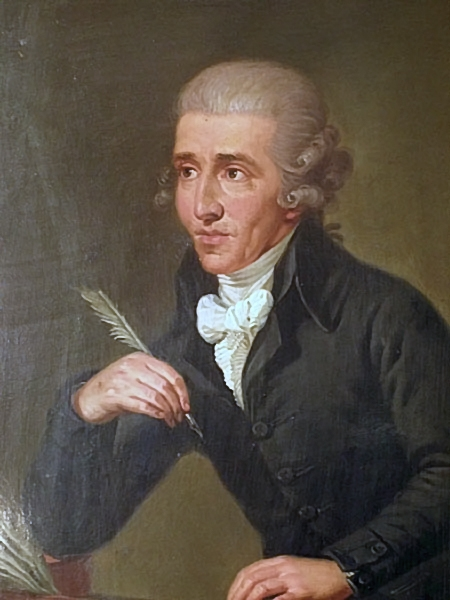
- Portrait of Joseph Haydn, ca. 1770
- Key: D major
- Catalogue: Hob. I:73
- Composed: 1782
- Duration: c. 25 minutes
- Movements: Four
- Scoring: Orchestra

The Symphony No. 73 in D major, Hoboken 1/73, is a symphony by Joseph Haydn composed in 1782. It is often known by the subtitle La chasse (transl. The Hunt) due to the hunting horn calls in the final movement, a popular trope in eighteenth century music.

== Music ==
The symphony is scored for flute, two oboes, bassoon, two horns, and strings. Some versions also include two trumpets and timpani which appear only in the Finale.

The work has four movements:

1. Adagio – Allegro
2. Andante, 2/4 in G major
3. Menuetto & Trio: Allegretto
4. La chasse Presto

The first movement follows a sonata form with a slow introduction. Notably, although the introduction ends on a dominant chord, the Allegro does not open in the tonic key. This movement displays one of Haydn's favorite musical devices, turning accompaniment into melody. Here, this is done in the simplest possible manner by constructing the main theme out of repeated notes. Once the repeated-note theme is established, then any time repeated notes are used in accompaniment, it sounds to the listener like thematic counterpoint.

The second movement is based on Haydn's song Gegenliebe, Hob. XVIIa:16. The song forms the refrain for a rondo. The contrasting episodes of the rondo are derived from the song-melody and are all in the minor.

The final movement was originally composed as the overture to Haydn's opera La fedeltà premiata (“Fidelity Rewarded”), a detail which has helped secure the dating of the symphony. The hunting melody of the finale is a quotation from La Chasse du cerf, a Divertissement for solo voices, chorus, and instrumental ensemble by the eighteenth century French composer Jean-Baptiste Morin. Morin himself drew upon the popular Sourcillade (or Vue) penned by André Danican Philidor in the first decade of the 18th century. Haydn's theme was therefore widely recognisable as a hunting motif.

Along with the famous coda to the Farewell Symphony, La Chasse is one of the few Haydn symphonies to end quietly.

== See also ==
- List of symphonies by name
