= List of compositions by Joachim Raff =

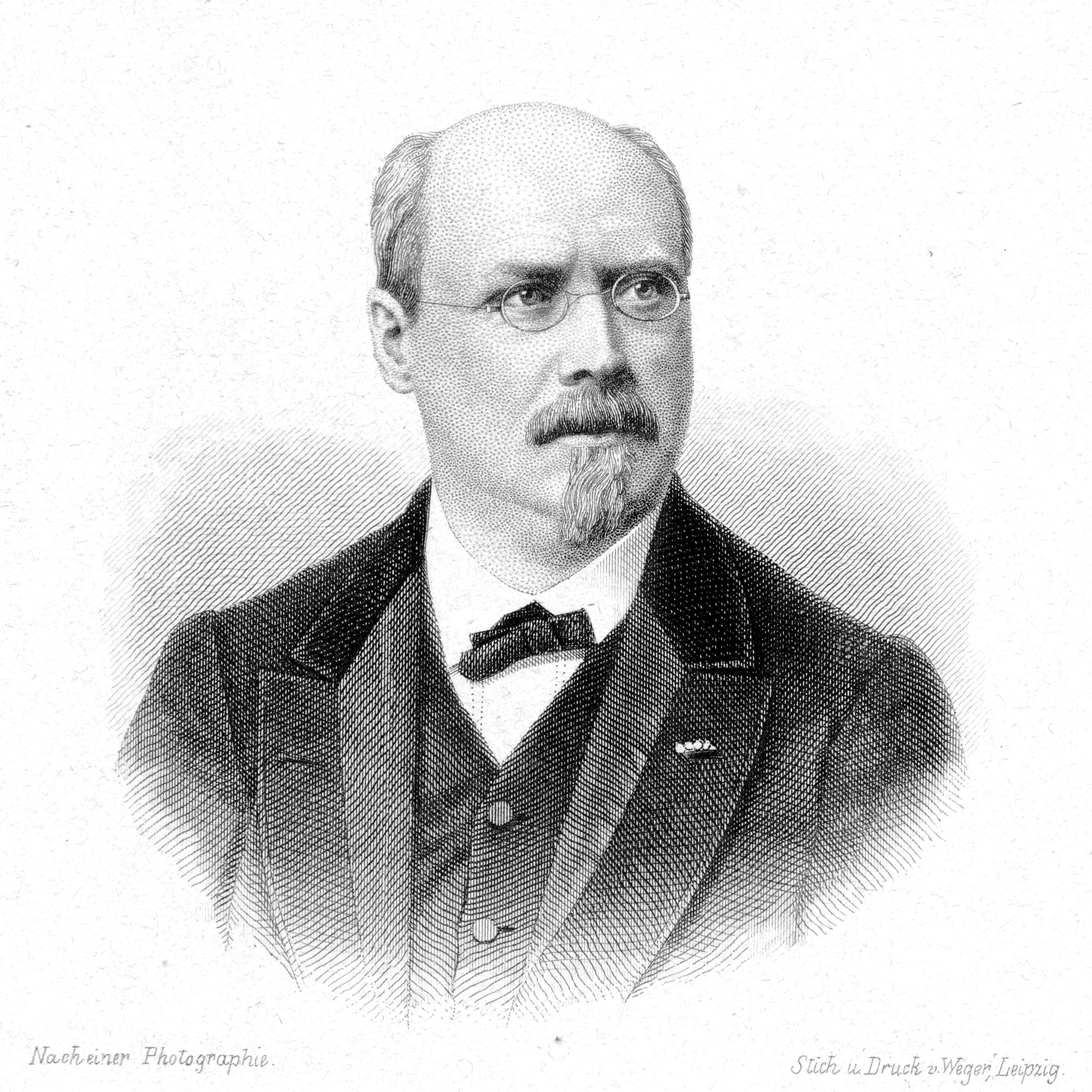
Joachim Raff (1822-1882)

This is a list of compositions by Joachim Raff. Raff was a prolific composer and composed numerous works in a wide variety of genres. His works include eleven symphonies, five concertos, six operas, eight string quartets, numerous other chamber works, over 100 works for solo piano and many songs and song cycles.

== Orchestral ==
=== Symphonies ===
- WoO. 18: Grand Symphony in E minor in five movements (lost; movements 4 and 5 re-used in Orchestral Suite No. 1 in C major, Op. 101)
- Op. 96: Symphony No. 1 in D major An das Vaterland ("To the Fatherland") (1859-1861)
- Op. 140: Symphony No. 2 in C major (1866)
- Op. 153: Symphony No. 3 in F major Im Walde ("In the Forest") (1869)
- Op. 167: Symphony No. 4 in G minor (1871)
- Op. 177: Symphony No. 5 in E major Lenore (1870-1872)
- Op. 189: Symphony No. 6 in D minor Gelebt: Gestrebt, Gelitten, Gestritten - Gestorben - Umworben ("Lived: Struggled, Suffered, Fought - Died - Glorified") (1874)
- Op. 201: Symphony No. 7 in B♭ major In den Alpen ("In the Alps") (1875)
- Op. 205: Symphony No. 8 in A major Frühlingsklänge ("Sounds of Spring") (1876)
- Op. 208: Symphony No. 9 in E minor Im Sommer ("In Summer") (1878)
- Op. 213: Symphony No. 10 in F minor Zur Herbstzeit ("To Autumn Time") (1879; revised 1881)
- Op. 214: Symphony No. 11 in A minor Der Winter ("The Winter") (1876, unfinished; completed by Max Erdmannsdörfer)

=== Soloist and orchestra ===
- Op. 67: The Love Fairy: Characteristic Concert Piece in A minor for violin and orchestra (1854)
- Op. 76: Ode to Spring: Concert Piece in G major for piano and orchestra (1857)
- Op. 161: Violin Concerto No. 1 in B minor (1870-1871)
- Op. 180: Suite for Violin and Orchestra in G minor (1873)
- Op. 185: Piano Concerto in C minor (1873)
- Op. 193: Cello Concerto No. 1 in D minor (1874)
- Op. 200: Suite for Piano and Orchestra in E♭ major (1875)
- WoO 45: Cello Concerto No. 2 in G major (1876)
- Op. 206: Violin Concerto No. 2 in A minor (1877)

=== Orchestral suites ===
- Op. 101: Orchestral Suite No. 1 in C major (1863)
- WoO. 35: Italian Suite in E minor (1871)
- Op. 194: Orchestral Suite No. 2 in F major In the Hungarian Style (1874)
- WoO. 45: Orchestral Suite No. 3 in B♭ major Thüringian (1877)

=== Other orchestral works ===
- WoO. 15: Festival Overture (1851-1852; lost)
- WoO. 16a: Fantasy in the form of a grand freely developed Overture (1853; destroyed by the composer)
- WoO. 17: Music to the tragedy Bernhard von Weimar (1854)
- Op. 103: Celebration Overture (1864)
- Op. 117: Festival Overture in A major (1864)
- Op. 123: Concert Overture in F major (1862)
- Op. 124: Festival Overture in B♭ major (1865)
- Eine feste Burg ist unser Gott, Ouvertüre zu einem Drama aus dem Dreißigjährigen Krieg (A mighty fortress is our God", Overture to a drama about the Thirty Years' War), Op. 127
- Op. 139: Festival March (1867)
- WoO. 48: Elegy for Orchestra (1879)
- WoO. 49: Orchestral Prelude to Shakespeare's The Tempest (1879)
- WoO. 50: Orchestral Prelude to Shakespeare's Macbeth (1879)
- WoO. 51: Orchestral Prelude to Shakespeare's Romeo and Juliet (1879)
- WoO. 52: Orchestral Prelude to Shakespeare's Othello (1879)
- WoO. 56: Grand Fugue for Orchestra (1882; fragment)

== Operas and choral works ==
=== Operas ===
- WoO. 14: King Alfred, opera in four acts (1848-1849)
- WoO. 20: Samson, opera in five acts (1853-1854)
- WoO. 29: The Password, opera in three acts (1868)
- Op. 154: Lady Phantom, comic opera in three acts (1870)
- WoO. 46: Benedetto Marcello, opera in three acts (1877-1878)
- WoO. 54: Die Eifersüchtigen (The Jealous Ones), comic opera in three acts (1881-1882)

=== Works for chorus and orchestra ===
- WoO. 8: Der 121. Psalm (Psalm 121, 1848)
- WoO. 16: Te Deum (1853)
- WoO. 19: Dornröschen (Sleeping Beauty or Briar Rose), fairy-tale epic in four parts (1855)
- Op. 80: Wachet auf! (Awake!), cantata after Emanuel Geibel (1858)
- Op. 100: Deutschlands Auferstehung (Germany's Resurrection), Festival Cantata for the fiftieth anniversary of the Battle of
- Op. 141: De Profundis, Psalm 130 for soprano, eight-part choir, and orchestra, dedicated to Franz Liszt (1867)
- WoO. 30a: Accompaniment of six wind instruments for the Laudi Sion & Stabat mater of the church in Lachen (1868; lost)
- Op. 171: Zwei Lieder (Two songs) for mixed choir and orchestra(1871)
- Op. 186: Morgenlied (Morning song)' and One Who Has Passed Away (1873)
- Op. 209: Die Tageszeiten (The times of day), text by Helge Heldt (pseudonym of Helene Raff), four movements for piano, choir and orchestra (1877-1878)
- WoO. 53: Die Sterne (The stars), text by Helge Heldt, cantata for choir and orchestra (1880)
- Op. 212: Welt-Ende – Gericht – Neue Welt (World's End - Judgement - New World), oratorio (1879-1881)

=== Works for choir a capella ===
- Op. 97: Ten Songs for Men's Choir (1853-1863)
- Op. 122: Ten Songs for Men's Choir (1853-1863)
- WoO. 27: Four Marian Antiphones after the Cantus Firmus of the Roman church (1868)
- WoO. 31: Kyrie and Gloria (1869)
- WoO. 32: Pater Noster (1869)
- WoO. 33: Ave Maria (1869)
- Op. 195: Ten Songs for Men's Choir (1860-1870)
- Op. 198: Ten Songs for Mixed Choir (1860-1874)

== Chamber music ==
=== Piano quintets ===
- Op. 107: Piano Quintet in A minor (1862)
- Op. 207b: Fantasy for Piano Quintet in G minor (1877)

=== Piano quartets ===
- Op. 202, No. 1: Piano Quartet No. 1 in G major (1876)
- Op. 202, No. 2: Piano Quartet No. 2 in C minor (1876)

=== Piano trios ===
- WoO. 9: Piano Trio in C minor (1849-1850; destroyed by the composer)
- Op. 102: Piano Trio No. 1 in C minor (1861)
- Op. 112: Piano Trio No. 2 in G major (1863)
- Op. 155: Piano Trio No. 3 in A minor (1870)
- Op. 158: Piano Trio No. 4 in D major (1870)

=== String quartets ===
- WoO. 13: String Quartet in C major (1849-1850; destroyed by the composer)
- Op. 77: String Quartet No. 1 in D minor (1855)
- Op. 90: String Quartet No. 2 in A major (1857)
- Op. 136: String Quartet No. 3 in E minor (1866)
- Op. 137: String Quartet No. 4 in A minor (1867)
- Op. 138: String Quartet No. 5 in G major (1867)
- Op. 192: Three String Quartets (1874)
  - No. 6 in C minor, Suite in Ancient Style
  - No. 7 in D major, The Maid of the Mill
  - No. 8 in C major, Suite in Canon Form

=== Violin sonatas ===
- Op. 73: Violin Sonata No. 1 in E minor (1853-1854)
- Op. 78: Violin Sonata No. 2 in A major (1858-1859)
- Op. 128: Violin Sonata No. 3 in D major (1865)
- Op. 129: Violin Sonata No. 4 in G minor (1866)
- Op. 145: Violin Sonata No. 5 in C minor (1868)

=== Other works for violin and piano ===
- Op. 57: From Switzerland: Fantastic Eclogue (1848)
- Op. 58: Two fantasy pieces for violin and piano (1850-1852; revised 1861)
- Op. 59: Duo for piano and cello or violin in A major (1855)
- Op. 85: Six pieces for violin and piano (1859)
- Op. 203: Volker, cyclic tone poem (1876)
- Op. 210: Suite for violin and piano in A major (1879)
- WoO. 55: Duo for violin and piano in G minor (1882)

=== Works for cello and piano ===
- Op. 59: Duo for piano and cello or violin in A major (1855)
- Op. 86: Three fantasy pieces for cello and piano (1854)
- Op. 182: Two Romances for cello and piano (1873)
- Op. 183: Cello Sonata in D major (1873)

=== Other chamber works ===
- Op. 124: Festival Overture for wind instruments on four beloved student songs (1865)
- WoO. 25: Introduction and Fugue for organ in E minor
- Op. 176: String Octet in C major (1872)
- Op. 178: String Sextet in G minor (1872)
- Op. 188: Sinfonietta in F major for 2 flutes, 2 oboes, 2 clarinets, 2 bassoons and 2 horns (1873)

== Piano music ==
- Op. 2: 3 Pièces caractéristiques (first written 1842; revised and published 1877)
- Op. 3: Scherzo in C minor (1842; revised 1881)
- Op. 5: 4 Galop-caprices (1843; revised 1878)
- Op. 6: Variations (1843; revised 1878)
- Op. 7: Rondo brillante in B♭ major (1843)
- Op. 11: Air suisse in A♭ major (1844)
- Op. 14: Grand Sonata in E♭ minor (1844; revised 1881)
- Op. 15: 6 Poèmes (1845)
- Op. 17: Album lyrique (1845; revised 1849)
- Op. 38: Grand Mazurka in A♭ major (1847)
- Op. 41: Romance in A♭ major (1847; revised 1850)
- Op. 54: 3 Dance-Caprices (1852)
- Op. 64: Caprice in F♯ minor (1855)
- Op. 69: Piano Suite No. 1 in A minor (1857)
- Op. 71: Piano Suite No. 2 in C major (1857)
- Op. 72: Piano Suite No. 3 in E minor (1857)
- Op. 79: Cachoucha-Caprice in C minor (1858)
- Op. 82: 12 Pieces for Piano Four Hands (1858-1859)
- Op. 91: Piano Suite No. 4 in D minor (1859)
- Op. 92: Caprice in D minor (1860)
- Op. 94: Impromptu-waltz in B♭ major (ca. 1860)
- Op. 99: 3 sonatinas (1861)
- Op. 104: Caprice brillante in E♭ major Le galop (1861)
- Op. 106: Fantasy-Polonaise in A minor (1861)
- Op. 111: 2 Caprices (1856; revised ca. 1865)
- Op. 115: 2 Morceaux lyriques (1864)
- Op. 116: Waltz-Caprice in G major (1864)
- Op. 118: Waltz favorite in D♭ major (1864)
- Op. 119: Fantasy in G minor (1864)
- Op. 125: 3 Piano Pieces (1865)
- Op. 126: 3 Piano Pieces (1865)
- Op. 142: Fantasy in F♯ major (1867)
- Op. 144: Tarаntella in A minor (1867)
- Op. 156: Waltz brillante in E♭ major (1870-1871)
- Op. 157: 2 Piano Pieces (1870)
- Op. 162: Piano Suite No. 5 in G minor (1870)
- Op. 163: Piano Suite No. 6 in G major (1871)
- Op. 164: 3 Piano Pieces (1871)
- Op. 166: 2 Piano Pieces (1871)
- Op. 168: Fantasy-Sonata in D minor (1871)
- Op. 196: 4 Piano Pieces (1875)
- Op. 197: Caprice in D♭ major (1875)
- Op. 204: Piano Suite No. 7 in B♭ major (1876). Hear Ossip Gabrilowitsch play Rigaudon, Op. 204, No. 3 by Raff (Welte-Mignon recording # D296) on a 1921 Baldwin C, 6'2" Welte-Mignon Reproducing Piano.

== Songs ==
=== Orchestral songs ===
- Op. 66: Dream-King and his Love (1854)
- Op. 199: Two Scenes (1875)

=== Songs for multiple voices ===
- Op. 114: Twelve Songs for Two Voices (1860-1864)
- Op. 184: Six Songs from Emanuel Geibel for Three Female Voices (1870-1873)

=== Lieder ===
- Op. 16: Three Lieder from Lord Byron (1844; destroyed by the composer)
- Op. 18: Three Lieder from Julius Scheffel (1844; destroyed by the composer)
- Op. 47: Three Lieder from J.G. Fischer (1848)
- Op. 48: Two Lieder from Gotthold Logau (1848)
- Op. 49: Three Lieder from J.G. Fischer (1848)
- Op. 50: Two Italian Lieder from C.O. Sternau (1849)
- Op. 51: Five Lieder from Emanual Geibel (1849-1850)
- Op. 52: Three Lieder from C.O. Sternau (1850)
- Op. 53: Two Lieder from the Rhine from C.O. Sternau (1849)
- WoO. 20a: Fatal Love, cycle of lieder and songs (1855)
- Op. 98: Spring Songs, 30 compositions for one voice (Romances, Ballads, Lieder and Songs) with piano accompaniment (1855-1863)
- WoO. 21: Serenade from C.O. Sternau (1859)
- Op. 172: Maria Stuart, cycle of songs (1872)
- Op. 173: Eight Songs (1868-1870)
- Op. 191: The Language of Flowers, six songs from Gustav Kastropp (1874)
- WoO. 47: Spring Song (before 1879)
- WoO. 52a: Two Settings of Tennyson's Tears, Idle Tears (1878 or 1879)
- Op. 211: Blondel de Nesle, cycle of songs (1880)

== Arrangements ==
=== Arrangements of works by others ===
==== Orchestral arrangements ====
- WoO. 14a: Orchestration and arrangement of Liszt's original sketches for the overture Der entfesselte Prometheus (1850)
- WoO. 34a: Orchestration of Huldigungsmarsch ("Homage March") by Richard Wagner (1871)
- WoO. 39: J.S. Bach's Chaconne for solo violin, arranged for large orchestra (1874)
- WoO. 41: J.S. Bach's English Suite arranged for orchestra (1874)

==== Choral arrangements ====
- WoO. 15b: Orchestral arrangement of Liszt's Psalm XX Domine salvum fac regum (1853)

==== Arrangements for piano four hands ====
- Op. 13: Waltz-Rondino on some motifs from the opera Les Huguenots by Giacomo Meyerbeer (1844)
- Op. 42: Der Prätendent, music by Franz Kücken (1847)
- WoO. 39: J.S. Bach's Chaconne for solo violin, arranged for piano four hands (1874)

==== Arrangements for violin and piano ====
- WoO. 10a: Arrangement of 3 Etudes and an Elegy for piano four hands by Karl Vollweiler (1849; unknown fate)
- WoO. 10b: Arrangement of 2 Romances for piano by Adolf von Henselt (1849; unknown fate)
- WoO. 10c: Arrangement of a song by Louis Spohr (1849; unknown fate)
- WoO. 10d: Arrangement of a song by Carl Reissiger (1849; unknown fate)
- WoO. 42: 3 Sonatas by Benedetto Marcello for Cello with added piano accompaniment employing free use of the numbered bass (1875)

==== Arrangements for solo piano ====
- Op. 4: Brilliant Fantasy on some motifs from the opera Maria Rudenz by Gaetano Donizetti (1842)
- Op. 7: Brilliant Rondo on the air Io son ricco e tu sei bella from the opera L'Elisire d'amore by Gaetano Donizetti (1843)
- Op. 18: Two Paraphrases on Lieder by Franz Liszt (1845)
- Op. 19: Eight Lieder by Mendelssohn (1845; lost)
- Op. 19: Dramatic Fantasy on motifs from the opera Die Beiden Prinzen by Heinrich Esser (1845)
- Op. 20: Jaléo and Xeres: two Spanish Dances after Spanish national melodies (1844; lost)
- Op. 28: Two famous airs from the opera Robert le Diable by Giacomo Meyerbeer (1846; lost)
- WoO. 4a: Paraphrase on Les Huguenots (1846; abandoned)
- Op. 34: Six Lieder by Franz Abt, Luise Barthelemy, Franz Kücken, Bernhard Molique and Franz Schmidt (1847)
- Op. 35: Fantasy on motifs from the opera Freischütz by Carl Maria von Weber (1847)
- Op. 36: Military Fantasy on some motifs from the opera Les Huguenot by Giacomo Meyerbeer (1847)
- Op. 37: Fantasy on motifs from the opera La sonnambula by Vincenzo Bellini (1847)
- Op. 39: Nocturne after a Romance by Franz Liszt (1847)
- WoO. 7: Fantasy on themes from Kücken's Prätendent (1847; lost)
- Op. 42: Piano transcriptions from Der Prätendent by Franz Kücken (1847)
- Op. 43: Divertimento on motifs from Fromental Halévy's opera La Juive (1848)
- Op. 44: Fantasy on motifs from the opera The Barber of Seville by Gioachino Rossini (1848)
- Op. 45: Reminiscences from Mozart's Don Giovanni (1848)
- Op. 46: Impromptu on "The Last Rose of Summer" (1849)
- WoO. 10: Grand Fantasy on motifs from the opera Das Diamantkreuz by Siegried Salomon (1849; lost)
- WoO. 11: Arrangement of two violin romances by Ludwig van Beethoven (1849)
- WoO. 12: Valse-Rondino on motifs from the opera Das Diamantkreuz by Siegried Salomon (1849)
- WoO. 12a: Concert Etude on a motif from the opera Puritani by Vincenzo Bellini (1849?)
- Op. 61: Four arrangements for piano (1853-1855)
  - No. 1: Caprice on Wagner's Lohengrin
  - No. 2: Reminiscences on Wagner's The Flying Dutchman
  - No. 3: Fantasy on motif's from Wagner's Tannhäuser
  - No. 4: Capriccio and rondo on motifs from the opera Genoveva by Robert Schumann
- Op. 62: Three Salon-Etudes on Richard Wagner's Operas (1853)
- Op. 65: Two arrangements for piano (1855)
  - No. 1: Fantasy on motifs from Benvenuto Cellini by Hector Berlioz
  - No. 2: Caprice on motifs from the opera King Alfred
- Op. 68: Five Transcriptions after Beethoven, Gluck, Mozart, Schumann and Spohr (1857)
- Op. 70: Trovatore and Traviata, 2 Salon paraphrases after Verdi (1857)
- Op. 81: Two arrangements for piano (1858)
  - No. 1: Sicilienne, Favourite air from the opera Les Vêpres Siciliennes by Verdi
  - No. 2: Tarantella after the tarantella from the opera Les Vêpres Siciliennes by Verdi
- WoO. 22: Two Marches from Handel's oratorios: Saul and Jephta (1859)
- Op. 121: Illustrations of the opera L'Africaine by Giacomo Meyerbeer (1864)
- WoO. 23: Selected pieces from the Violin Sonatas by J.S. Bach (1865)
- WoO. 24: Concert paraphrase on "Evening Song" by Robert Schumann (1865)
- WoO. 26: Reminiscences on the opera Die Meistersinger von Nürnberg by Richard Wagner (1867)
- WoO. 30: Six Cello Sonatas by J.S. Bach arranged for piano (1868)
- WoO. 34: Improvisation on the lied "Der Lindenzweig" by Leopold Damrosch (1870)
- WoO. 37: Berceuse after an idea by Charles Gounod (1872)
- WoO. 38: Juliet's Waltz by Charles Gounod (1872)
- WoO. 40: Three orchestral suites by J.S. Bach arranged for piano (1874)

=== Arrangements of own works ===
==== Orchestral arrangements ====
- Op. 163b: Evening Rhapsody, arrangement of Abends from the Piano Suite No. 5, Op. 163
- Op. 174: Mazurka, Polonaise, Russian dance, orchestral arrangement of three pieces from Aus dem Tanzsalon
- Op. 203: Hungarian Dance, arrangement for violin and orchestra

==== Arrangements for piano four hands ====
Most of the arrangements for piano four hands are made after Raff's orchestral works.

- Op. 73b: First Grand Sonata, arrangement of the Violin Sonata No. 1 in E minor, Op. 73
- Op. 77b: String Quartet, arrangement of the String Quartet No. 1 in D minor, Op. 77
- Op. 78b: Second Grand Sonata, arrangement of the Violin Sonata No. 2 in A major, Op. 78
- Op. 96b: Symphony No. 1 in D major An Das Vaterland
- Op. 99b: Three Sonatilles
- Op. 101b: Orchestral Suite No. 1 in C major
- Op. 103b: Celebration Overture
- Op. 117b: Festival Overture
- Op. 123b: Concert Overture
- Op. 124b: Festival Overture for wind instruments on four beloved student songs
- Op. 127b: A mighty fortress is our God: Overture to a drama about the 30 Years War
- Op. 132b: Brilliant March
- Op. 135b: Leaves and Blossoms, 12 Piano Pieces
- Op. 136b: String Quartet No. 3, arrangement of the String Quartet No. 3 in E minor, Op. 136
- Op. 137b: String Quartet No. 4, arrangement of the String Quartet No. 4 in A minor, Op. 137
- Op. 138b: String Quartet No. 5, arrangement of the String Quartet No. 5 in G major, Op. 138
- Op. 139b: Festival March
- Op. 140b: Symphony No. 2 in C major
- Op. 150: Chaconne for Two Pianos
- Op. 153b: Symphony No. 3 in F major Im Valde
- Op. 167b: Symphony No. 4 in G minor
- WoO. 35b: Italian Suite in E minor
- Op. 177b: Symphony No. 5 in E major Leonore
- WoO. 28b: Waltz-Impromptu after The Tyrolienne
- Op. 181b: Dance of Death, second humoresque in waltz form
- Op. 188b: Sinfonietta in F major
- Op. 189b: Symphony No. 6 in D minor Gelebt, Gestrebt, Gelitten, Gestritten, Gestorben, Umworben
- Op. 192b: Arrangement of the String Quartets Nos. 6, 7 & 8
- Op. 194b: Orchestral Suite No. 2 in F major In the Hungarian Style
- Op. 201b: Symphony No. 7 in B♭ major In den Alpen
- Op. 205b: Symphony No. 8 in A major Frühlingsklänge
- Op. 208b: Symphony No. 9 in E minor Im Sommer
- Op. 213b: Symphony No. 10 in F minor Zur Herbstzeit
- WoO. 49b: Orchestral Prelude to Shakespeare's The Tempest
- WoO. 50b: Orchestral Prelude to Shakespeare's Macbeth
- WoO. 51b: Orchestral Prelude to Shakespeare's Romeo and Juliet
- WoO. 52b: Orchestral Prelude to Shakespeare's Othello

==== Arrangements for voice and piano ====
- WoO 14b: King Alfred
- WoO 20b: Samson
- Op. 66b: Dream-King and his Love
- Op. 80b: Awake!
- Op. 100b: Germany's Resurrection, Festival Cantata for the fifty year's jubilee of the German people's Battle at Leipzig
- Op. 141b: De profundis (Psalm 130)
- WoO. 29b: The Password
- Op. 154b: Lady Phantom
- Op. 171b: Two Songs for Mixed Choir
- Op. 186b: Morning Song and One Who Has Passed Away
- Op. 199b: Two Scenes
- Op. 209b: The Times of Day
- WoO. 46b: Benedetto Marcello
- Op. 212b: World's End - Judgement - New World

==== Arrangements for alternative piano accompaniment ====
- Op. 67b: The Love Fairy
- Op. 76b: Ode to Spring
- Op. 161b: Violin Concerto No. 1 in B minor
- Op. 180b: Suite for Violin and Orchestra G minor
- Op. 193b: Cello Concerto No. 1 in D minor
- WoO. 44b: Cello Concerto No. 2 in G major
- Op. 206b: Violin Concerto No. 2 in A minor

==== Arrangements for solo piano ====
- Op. 82b: 12 Pieces for Piano Four Hands
- Op. 139c: Festival March
- Op. 101c: Orchestral Suite No. 1 in C major
- Op. 154c: Lady Phantom
- Op. 174: From the Dance Salon
- Op. 177c: Symphony No. 5 in E major Leonore
- Op. 200b: Suite for Piano and Orchestra in E♭ major
