= Rosanna Scalfi Marcello =

Italian singer and composer (fl. 1723–1742)

Anna Bon
- Born: Rosanna Scalfi
- Occupations: Singer; composer
- Years active: fl. 1723–1742

Rosanna Scalfi Marcello (fl. 1723–1742) was an Italian singer and composer of the late Baroque and early Classical periods.

== Life ==
Rosanna Scalfi's exact birth and death dates are unknown; she was professionally active around 1723–1742 in Venice. She was a gondola singer of the Venetian arie di battello–a tradition of simple strophic songs. A legendary account tells of the composer and nobleman Benedetto Marcello, while above the ciy's Grand Canal, hearing Scalfi sing. Impressed by her voice, Marcello began instructing her in vocal training around 1723; the two were secretly wed in a religious ceremony on 20 May 1728, when she was twenty-four years old. However, this marriage to a commoner was unlawful and they never completed the civil requirements. After Marcello died of tuberculosis in 1739, the marriage was declared null by the state, and Rosanna was unable to inherit his estate. Left destitute, she filed suit on 1 February 1742 against Benedetto's brother Alessandro Marcello, seeking financial support, but her claims were rejected. Also in 1742, she appeared as Arbace in Giuseppe Antonio Paganelli's Artaserse at St. Salvatore during the Ascension season that same year. Some of Marcello's dramatic cantatas were likely written with her in mind, and she performed Marcello's settings of psalms. Little else is known of her life.

Scalfi Marcello composed twelve cantatas for alto and basso continuo, writing most if not all of the texts, as well. Musicologist Eleanor Selfridge-Field notes that these cantatas "are far simpler than Benedetto Marcello’s numerous cantatas but show a basic mastery of compositional technique".

The manuscript volume, Twelve Cantatas for Alto Voice and Basso Continuo (ca. 1730), has been published in modern edition by Deborah Hayes and John Glenn Paton (Fayetteville, AR: ClarNan Editions, 2012). The editors' preface includes a biography of the composer, notes on the cantata lyrics and music, and guidelines for performance. The edition also contains continuo realizations, poetic rendering of the lyrics in Italian, and English translation.

== List of cantatas ==
I. Io ti voglio adorar
II. In questo giorno
III. Quand'io miro in oriente
IV. Solcare il mar tranquillo
V. Dunque fia vero
VI. Mirar quei chiari lumi
VII. Arde quest'alma
VIII. Ferma, Fileno ingrato
IX. Mio cor, alfin sei vinto
X. Arder di due pupille
XI. Ecco il momento
XII. Se mai non sieno

Rosanna Marcello appears as a character in Joachim Raff's 1878 opera Benedetto Marcello, sung by mezzo-soprano.
