= Des Deutschen Vaterland =

German nationalist song (1813)

Was ist des Deutschen Vaterland is a German nationalist song by Ernst Moritz Arndt (1813) which was popular in the 19th century.

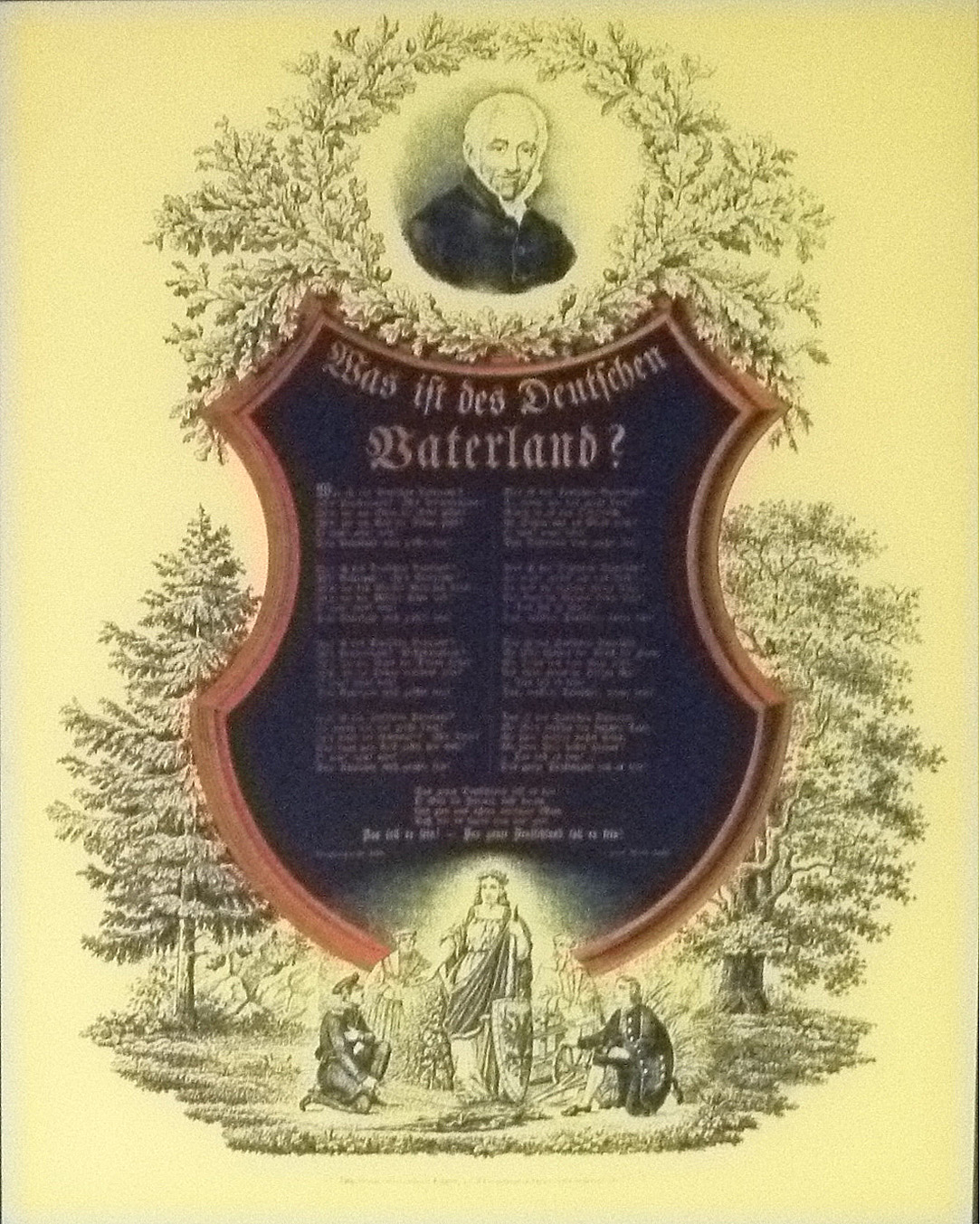
Was ist des Deutschen Vaterland

== History ==
In the text, Arndt asks the German question and answers it by demanding a Greater German nation-state comprising all German-speaking areas in Europe. The song was performed for the first time in Berlin in 1814.

As the original tune did not become popular, Gustav Reichardt wrote a new melody in 1825. This new tune made the song very popular among the German population that desired the transformation of the German Confederation into a united empire, instead of the previous situation where there were multiple duchies and kingdoms.

Joachim Raff used Reichhardt's tune as a leitmotif in his symphony An das Vaterland.

In 1911, Emil Sembritzki, a German schoolteacher, wrote a song known as "Was ist des Deutschen Tochterland?", which used the 1825 tune and embraced German colonialism.

== Lyrics ==
Arndt enumerates German states and regions and asks whether these particular areas are the fatherland of all Germans. He immediately replies with ″no″ and finally concludes that no particular state or states can be the German fatherland, which is understood to be the entirety of predominantly German-speaking areas.

Original German

Was ist des Deutschen Vaterland?
Ist’s Preußenland? Ist’s Schwabenland?
Ist’s, wo am Rhein die Rebe blüht?
Ist’s, wo am Belt die Möwe zieht?
O nein, nein, nein!
Sein Vaterland muss größer sein!

Was ist des Deutschen Vaterland?
Ist’s Bayerland? Ist’s Steierland?
Ist’s, wo des Marsen Rind sich streckt?
Ist’s, wo der Märker Eisen reckt?
O nein, nein, nein!
Sein Vaterland muss größer sein!

Was ist des Deutschen Vaterland?
Ist’s Pommerland? Ist’s
Westfalenland?
Ist’s, wo der Sand der Dünen weht?
Ist’s, wo die Donau brausend geht?
O nein, nein, nein!
Sein Vaterland muss größer sein!

Was ist des Deutschen Vaterland?
So nenne mir das große Land!
Ist’s Land der Schweizer? Ist’s Tirol?
Das Land und Volk gefiel mir wohl!
Doch nein, nein, nein!
Sein Vaterland muss größer sein!

Was ist des Deutschen Vaterland?
So nenne mir das große Land!
Gewiss, es ist das Österreich,
An Ehren und an Siegen reich?
O nein, nein, nein!
Sein Vaterland muss größer sein!

Was ist des Deutschen Vaterland?
So nenne endlich mir das Land!
So weit die deutsche Zunge klingt
Und Gott im Himmel Lieder singt:
Das soll es sein!
Das, wackrer Deutscher, nenne dein!

Das ist des Deutschen Vaterland,
Wo Eide schwört der Druck der Hand,
Wo Treue hell vom Auge blitzt
Und Liebe warm im Herzen sitzt.
Das soll es sein!
Das, wackrer Deutscher, nenne dein!

Das ist des Deutschen Vaterland,
Wo Zorn vertilgt den welschen Tand,
Wo jeder Franzmann heißet Feind,
Wo jeder Deutsche heißet Freund.
Das soll es sein!
Das ganze Deutschland soll es sein!

Das ganze Deutschland soll es sein,
O Gott vom Himmel, sieh darein
Und gib uns rechten deutschen Mut,
Dass wir es lieben treu und gut!
Das soll es sein!
Das ganze Deutschland soll es sein!

English translation

|What is the German’s fatherland?
Is it Prussia? Is it Swabia?
Is it where the vines blossom on the Rhine?
Is it where the gull moves on the Belt?
Oh no, no, no!
His fatherland must be bigger!

What is the German’s fatherland?
Is it Bavaria? Is it Styria?
Is it where the cattle of the Marsi roam?
Is it where the citizens of the Mark mold iron?
Oh no, no, no!
His fatherland must be bigger!

What is the German’s fatherland?
Is it Pomerania? Is it Westphalia?
Is it where the sand of dunes blows?
Is it where the Danube rushes along?
Oh no, no, no!
His fatherland must be bigger!

What is the German’s fatherland?
So name the great land to me!
Is it the land of the Swiss? Is it Tyrol?
The land and people that please me well!
But no, no, no!
His fatherland must be bigger!

What is the German’s fatherland?
So name the great land to me!
Certainly it must be Austria,
Rich in victories and in honors?
Oh no! No! No!
His fatherland must be bigger!

What is the German’s fatherland?
So name the great land to me, already!

As far as the German tongue sounds
And sings songs to God in heaven:
That shall it be! That shall it be!
That, brave German, call that yours!

That is the German’s fatherland,
Where oaths are sworn with curled hand,
Where loyalty blazes brightly from the eye
And love sits warmly in the heart.
That shall it be,
That, brave German, shall it be!

That is the German’s fatherland,
Where rage wipes out the foreign junk,
Where every Frenchman is called enemy,
Where every German is called friend.
That shall it be,
The whole of Germany it should be.

The whole Germany shall it be,
O God from heaven, see within
And give us real German courage,
That we may love it faithfully and well.
That shall it be!
The whole of Germany it should be.
