= Symphony No. 1 (Raff) =

- An das Vaterland
- by Joachim Raff
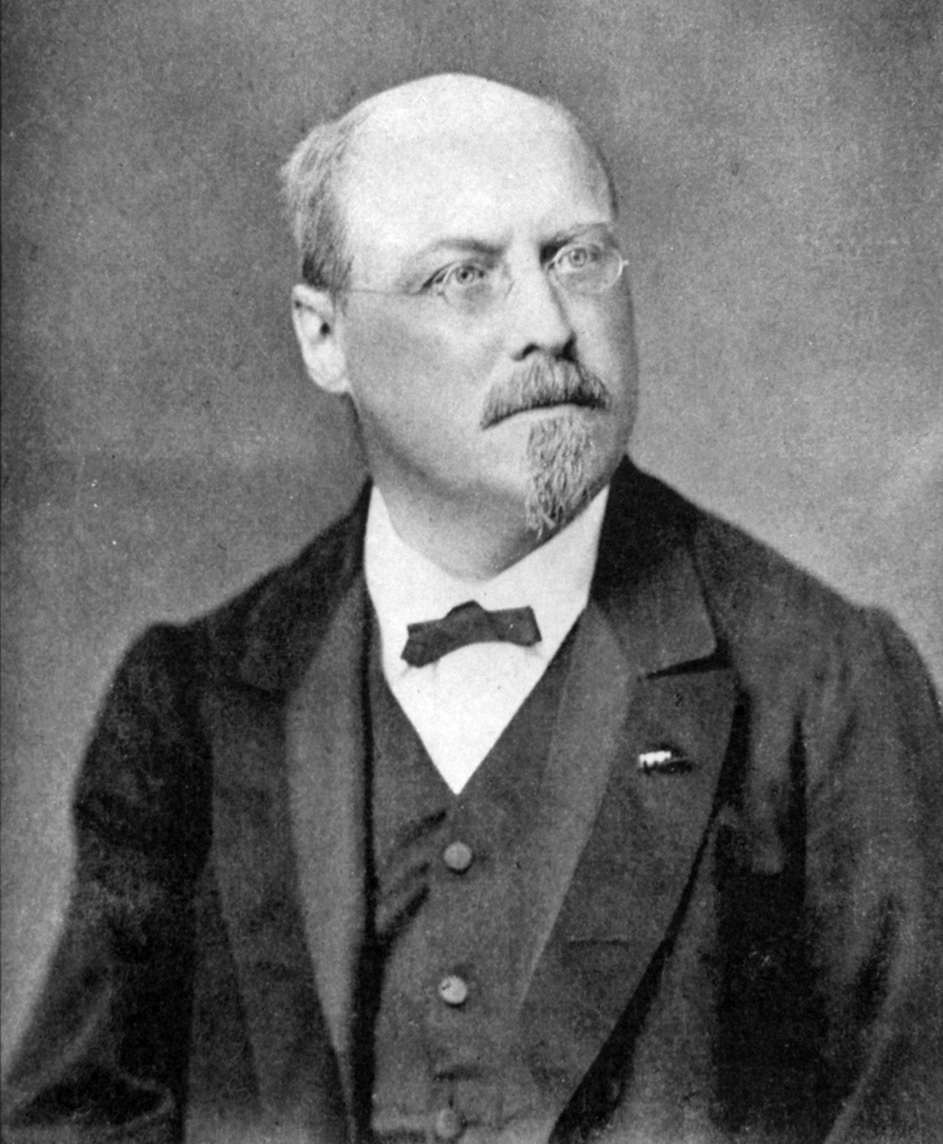
- The composer, 1878
- Key: D major
- Opus: 96
- Composed: 1859–1861:
- Dedication: Charles Alexander, Grand Duke of Saxe-Weimar-Eisenach
- Performed: February 1863: Musikverein, Vienna
- Published: 1864 J. Schuberth & Co, Leipzig
- Duration: 68 min
- Movements: 5

Symphony No. 1 in D major, An das Vaterland (To the Fatherland), Op. 96, was composed by Joachim Raff between 1859 and 1861.

== History ==
The work was Raff's first numbered symphony, though not the first symphony he had written. He composed a Grand Symphony in E minor, WoO. 18, in 1854, but only two of the work's original five movements survive.

Raff entered the completed symphony in a competition organized in Vienna, sponsored by Gesellschaft der Musikfreunde and judged by Ferdinand Hiller, Carl Reinecke, Robert Volkmann and Vinzenz Lachner. It won first prize out of 32 entries.

The symphony was premiered in February 1863 in Vienna at the Musikverein, conducted by Joseph Hellmesberger Sr. It is dedicated to Charles Alexander, Grand Duke of Saxe-Weimar-Eisenach and was published in 1864 in Leipzig by J. Schuberth & Co. The duration is between 60 and 70 minutes.

== Music ==
The symphony is scored for 2 flutes, 2 oboes, 2 clarinets in A, 2 bassoons, 4 horns in F, 2 trumpets in F, 2 trombones, bass trombone, timpani, and strings.

The symphony is structured in five movements:

1. Allegro
2. Scherzo. Allegro molto vivace (D minor)
3. Larghetto (B♭ major)
4. Allegro dramatico (G minor)
5. Larghetto sostenuto (D minor)

Raff uses extensively a melody composed in 1825 by Gustav Reichardt for Ernst Moritz Arndt's poem Was ist des Deutschen Vaterland?.

According to Helen Raff's biography of her father, "The first three movements are supposed to show German life and existence, the fourth describes German disunity." She further adds: "The fifth movement begins with a lament on the destiny of greater Germany and then proceeds to develop prophetic visions of future unity and majesty." Joachim Raff's note about the symphony states "Here the composer felt himself permitted the use of a motive not original with him ... as a symbol."

== Sources ==
- Symphony No.1, Op.96: Scores at the International Music Score Library Project
- An das Vaterland on YouTube
