= Op. 167 =

In music, Op. 167 stands for Opus number 167. Compositions that are assigned this number include:

- Raff – Symphony No. 4
- Reinecke – Undinesonate
- Saint-Saëns – Clarinet Sonata
- Schubert – Gesang der Geister über den Wassern
