= Arianna (Marcello) =

Arianna (concert performance Venice, 1727, first fully staged performance Venice, 1913) is an opera by the Venetian nobleman composer Benedetto Marcello to a libretto by Vincenzo Cassani, with contributions by Pietro Pariati. The opera was recorded under Filippo Maria Bressan in 2000.
