= Symphony No. 4 (Raff) =

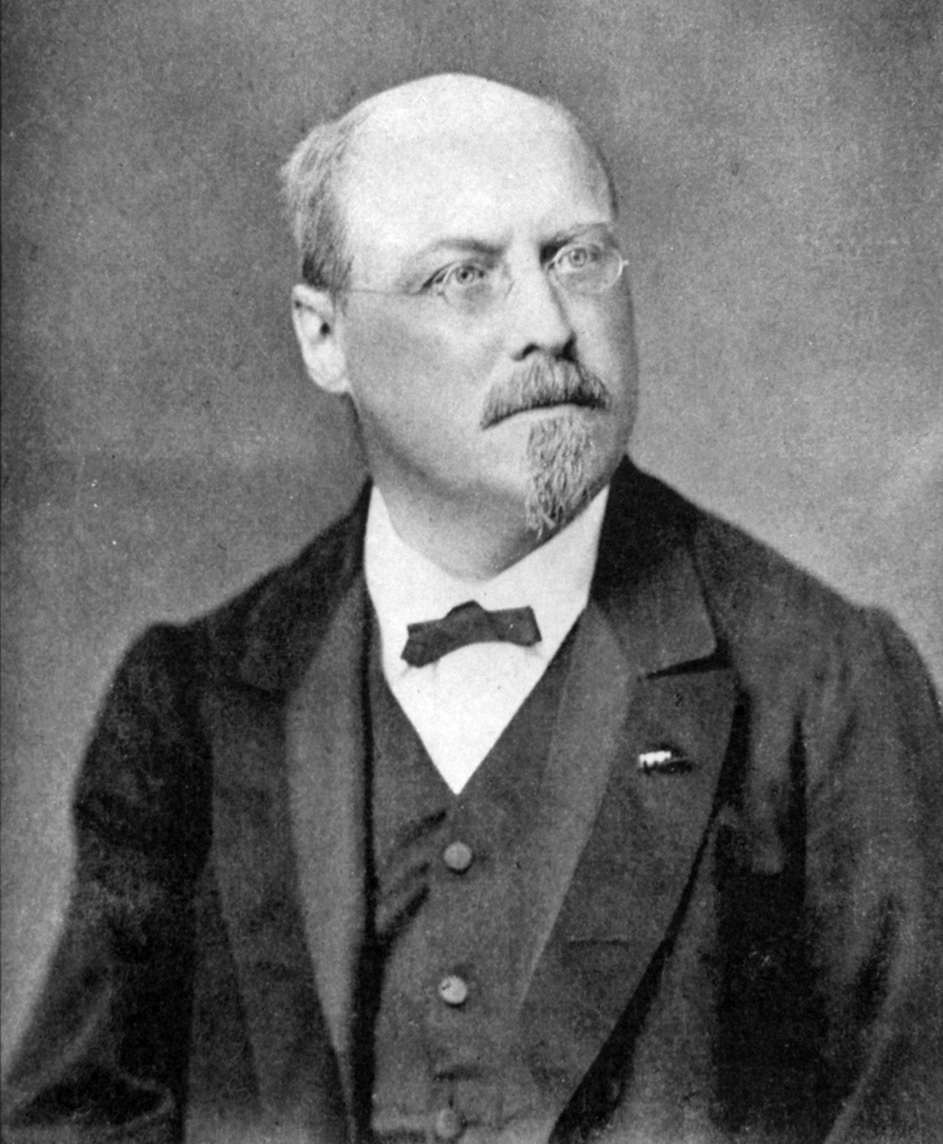
Joachim Raff in 1978

Symphony No. 4 in G minor, Op. 167, was composed by Joachim Raff in the spring and summer of 1871, during the time of the Franco-Prussian War. The work was published in October 1872. Like his Second Symphony, it does not carry a descriptive title and there is no evidence that Raff had a particular programme in mind when he wrote the symphony.

Following the success of his Third Symphony and the opera Dame Kobold, the orchestras were eager to perform Raff's new symphony. It received its premiere on 8 February 1872 in a concert at the Royal Hoftheatre in Wiesbaden, conducted by Wilhelm Jahn, followed by more performances later that year. On 25 October it was performed in Frankfurt under the baton of Karl Müller and six days later it was performed at the Leipzig Gewandhaus conducted by Raff. The work was also performed in Brussels in February 1873 conducted by Henri Vieuxtemps.

Despite its success, the work was overshadowed by Raff's Fifth Symphony, which ultimately became his most successful symphony during his lifetime.

== Music ==
The symphony is scored for 2 flutes, 2 clarinets, 2 bassoons, 4 horns, 2 trumpets, triangle, and strings.

It is structured in the traditional symphony form of four movements:

1. Allegro (G minor)
2. Allegro molto (E♭ major)
3. Andante, non troppo mosso (C minor)
4. Allegro (G minor – G major)

A typical performance lasts for about 30–35 minutes.
