= Des Deutschen Tochterland =

Was ist des Deutschen Tochterland (lit. 'What is the German's daughterland') is a German colonialist song by the German teacher Emil Sembritzki (1911). Its melody comes from the more well-known German nationalist song Was ist des Deutschen Vaterland.

== History ==
The original melody came from Was ist des Deutschen Vaterland's 1825 melody, which was more popular than the original 1814 melody.

The lyrics were composed in 1911 by Emil Sembritzki, who was a German teacher in the German colony of Kamerun. He was also the writer of multiple books on German colonies, such as Kamerun and Owanama.

In the song, the concept of the original song that gradually expands the list of named places (which form the German Fatherland) is kept, but is adapted to various German colonies. A notable exception to the list is Kiautschou, which is not listed in the song.

== Lyrics ==
Was ist des Deutschen Tochterland?

Ist’s Kamerun, Dualastrand?
Ist’s wo die Ambasbucht sich dehnt?
Ist’s wo der Schlund des Loba gähnt?
O nein, nein, nein —
Neu-Deutschland muss wohl größer sein.

Was ist des Deutschen Tochterland?

Ist’s Lomé heiß, ist’s Togostrand?
Ist’s, wo der Ewe Stoffe webt,
Der Haussa mit dem Pferde lebt?
O nein, nein, nein —
Neu-Deutschland muss wohl größer sein.

Was ist des Deutschen Tochterland?

Ist’s Angra klein, Kaokosand?
Ist’s, wo der Hottentott sich regt,
Der Herero dort den Ochsen hegt?
O nein, nein, nein —
Neu-Deutschland muss wohl größer sein.

Was ist des Deutschen Tochterland?

Ist’s Usagara wohlbekannt?
Ist’s, wo man Suaheli spricht?
Ist’s wo der Mtussi hält Gericht?
O nein, nein, nein —
Neu-Deutschland muss wohl größer sein.

Was ist des Deutschen Tochterland?

So nenne mir das große Land,
Gewiss ist’s Neu-Guinea dann,
Samoa hat mir’s angetan.
O nein, nein, nein —
Neu-Deutschland muss wohl größer sein.

Was ist des Deutschen Tochterland?

So nenne endlich mir das Land,
So weit die deutsche Flagge weht,
Des Kaisers Macht und Wille geht.
Das soll es sein!
Das, kühner Deutscher, nenne dein!

Das Größer-Deutschland soll es sein,

O Gott, vom Himmel, sieh darein
Und gib uns echten deutschen Mut,
Dass wir es lieben treu und gut.
Das soll es sein!
Das Größer-Deutschland soll es sein!

Translation:

What is the German daughterland?

Is it Cameroon, Duala’s shore?
Is it where the Ambas Bay stretches out?
Is it where the mouth of the Loba yawns?
Oh no, no, no —
New Germany must surely be larger.

What is the German daughterland?

Is it hot Lomé, is it Togo’s shore?
Is it where the Ewe weaves cloth,
The Hausa lives with the horse?
Oh no, no, no —
New Germany must surely be larger.

What is the German daughterland?

Is it little Angra, Kaoko’s sand?
Is it where the Hottentot stirs,
The Herero tends the ox?
Oh no, no, no —
New Germany must surely be larger.

What is the German daughterland?

Is it well-known Usagara?
Is it where Swahili is spoken?
Is it where the Mtusi holds court?
Oh no, no, no —
New Germany must surely be larger.

What is the German daughterland?

Then name me the great land,
Surely it is New Guinea then,
Samoa has taken my fancy.
Oh no, no, no —
New Germany must surely be larger.

What is the German daughterland?

Then finally name me the land,
As far as the German flag flies,
Where the Emperor’s power and will prevail.
That shall be it!
That, bold German, call your own!

It shall be the Greater Germany,

O God in heaven, look down,
And give us true German courage,
That we may love it faithfully and well.
That shall be it!
It shall be the Greater Germany!
