= Vaterlandslied (Arndt) =

Song

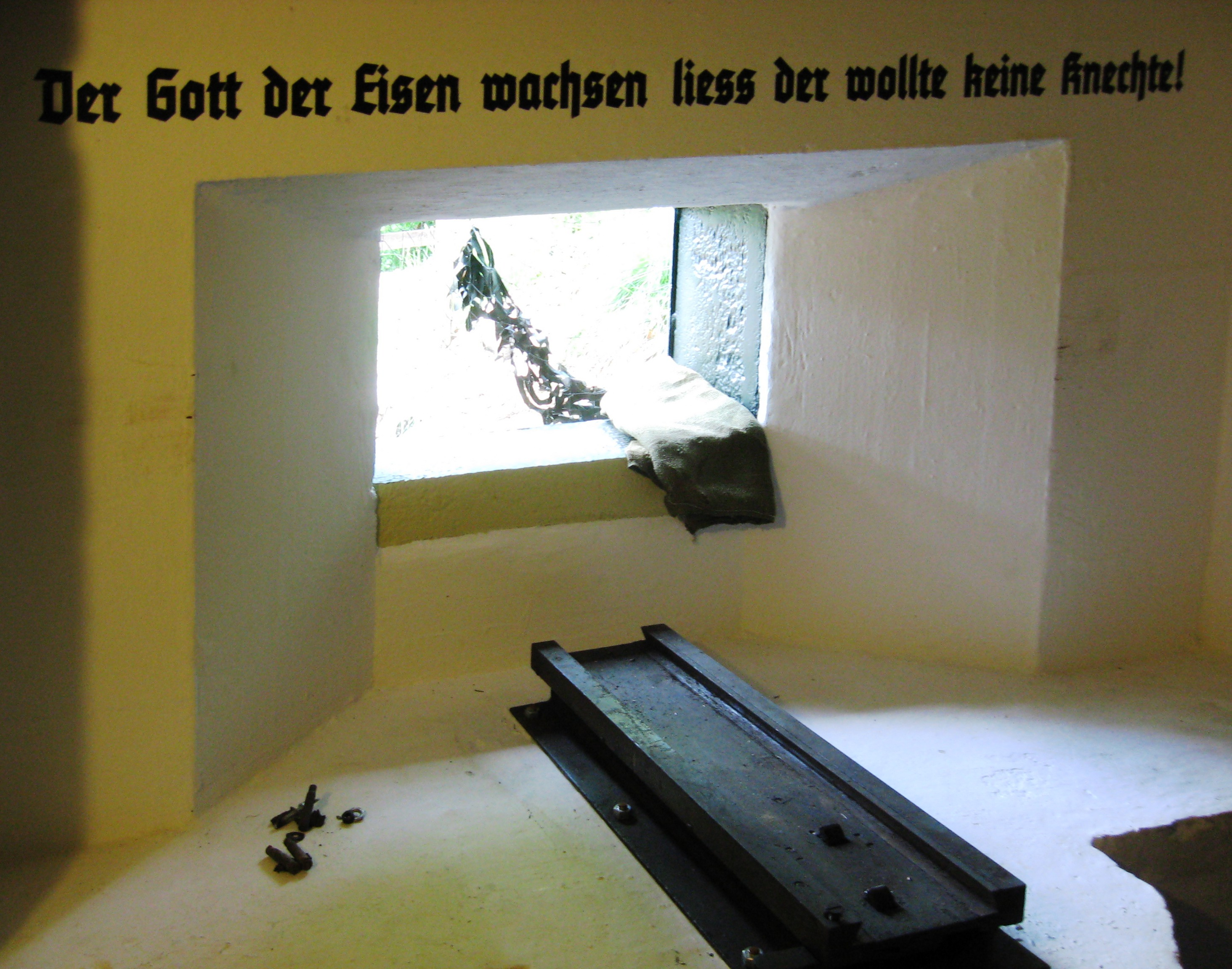
Der Gott, der Eisen wachsen ließ written on a bunker at the Siegfried Line (Westwall) in Haustadt, Beckingen, Saarland

The Vaterlandslied (Song of the Fatherland) is a patriotic poem written by Ernst Moritz Arndt in 1812. It is also known by its first line Der Gott, der Eisen wachsen ließ (The God who made iron grow).

The song was written to denounce the fact that several German states fought on the side of Napoleon to the detriment of their own nation. In 1812, the armies of the Confederation of the Rhine, Austria and Prussia participated in the French invasion of Russia. Many patriots such as Baron von Stein and Ernst Moritz Arndt left Germany and got positions in the Russian state.

With the music of Albert Methfessel (1785–1869), Arndt's Vaterlandslied became very popular during the German campaign of 1813, and remained part of the canon of patriotic songs throughout the 19th and early 20th century.

== Text ==
Vaterlandslied
Der Gott, der Eisen wachsen ließ,
Der wollte keine Knechte,
Drum gab er Säbel, Schwerdt, und Spieß
Dem Mann in seine Rechte,
Drum gab er ihm den kühnen Muth,
Den Zorn der freien Rede,
Daß er bestände bis aufs Blut,
Bis in den Tod die Fehde.

So wollen wir was Gott gewollt
Mit rechten Treuen halten
Und nimmer im Tyrannensold
Die Menschenschädel spalten;
Doch wer für Tand und Schande ficht,
Den hauen wir zu Scherben,
Der soll im teutschen Lande nicht
Mit teutschen Männern erben.

O Teutschland, heil’ges Vaterland!
O teutsche Lieb und Treue!
Du hohes Land! du schönes Land!
Dir schwören wir aufs neue:
Dem Buben und dem Knecht die Acht!
Der speise Kräh’n und Raben!
So ziehn wir aus zur Hermannsschlacht,
Und wollen Rache haben.

Laßt brausen, was nur brausen kann,
In hellen, lichten Flammen!
Ihr Teutschen, alle Mann für Mann
Zum heil’gen Krieg zusammen!
Und hebt die Herzen himmelan!
Und himmelan die Hände!
Und rufet alle Mann für Mann:
Die Knechtschaft hat ein Ende!

Laßt klingen, was nur klingen kann,
Die Trommeln und die Flöten!
Wir wollen heute Mann für Mann
Mit Blut das Eisen röthen,
Mit Henkerblut, Franzosenblut –
O süßer Tag der Rache!
Das klinget allen Teutschen gut,
Das ist die große Sache.

Laßt wehen, was nur wehen kann,
Standarten weh’n und Fahnen!
Wir wollen heut uns Mann für Mann
Zum Heldentode mahnen;
Auf! fliege hohes Siegspanier
Voran dem kühnen Reihen!
Wir siegen oder sterben hier
Den süßen Tod der Freien.

Translation:

The god who made iron grow
Did not want slaves;
Therefore he gave sabre, sword and spear
To man in his right hand;
Therefore he gave him bold courage,
The rage of free speech,
So that he would prevail to the last drop of blood,
Even unto death, in the struggle.

What God desires, we desire to maintain
With righteous loyalty,
And never for tyrant's wages;
To never to split men's skulls.
But whoever fights for trumpery and shame,
Him we cut into bits.
He shall not inherit in the German land
With German men.

O Germany, holy fatherland!
O German love and loyalty!
You high land! You beautiful land!
We swear to thee anew:
To the rascal and slave, watch out!
Let him feed crows and ravens!
Thus we advance for Hermann's battle,
And want to take revenge.

Let roar whatever can roar,
In bright radiant flames!
You Germans, all, every man,
To the sacred war together!
And raise your hearts toward heaven,
And toward heaven your hands,
And call, all, every man:
Slavery has an end!

Let resound whatever can resound,
The drums and flutes!
We want today, every man,
To redden iron with blood,
With enemy blood, French blood,
O sweet day of revenge!
That sounds good to all Germans,
That is the great cause.

Let flutter whatever can flutter,
Banners flutter and flags!
We want today, every man,
To urge ourselves to heroic death.
Up! fly high, victory banner,
Before the bold ranks!
We conquer or die here
The sweet death of free men.
