= Berliner Liedertafel =

- Choir
- Also known as: Berlin choral society
- Origin: Berlin, Germany
- Founded: December 1808
- Founder: Carl Friedrich Zelter
- Genre: Male voice choir
- Members: 117
- Notable members: Ludwig Berger, Bernhard Klein, Gustav Reichardt

Berliner Liedertafel (Berlin choral society), as the name for a male-voice choir, was first used in December 1808 by Carl Friedrich Zelter, who established the first north German prototype for such male-voice choirs. In 1819 another society was founded by Ludwig Berger, Bernhard Klein, Gustav Reichardt and Ludwig Rellstab and In 1884, Adolf Zander founded the still active men's singing club Berliner Liedertafel e.V.

== History ==
=== The (original) Berlin Liedertafel of 1809 ===
The first Berlin choral society also known as "Zelter Liedertafel", named after its founder Carl Friedrich Zelter, was the first male choral society of its kind and a model for similar groups. Composed of 25 men who wrote and performed works for each other, used Das Englische Haus (The English House) on Mohrenstraße as their meeting place.

=== The (younger) Berliner Liedertafel of 1819 ===
The 1819 "Younger Berlin Liedertafel" (or even younger Liedertafel of Berlin) founded by Ludwig Berger, Bernhard Klein, Gustav Reichardt and Ludwig Rellstab, continued tradition of popular choral music in the city. It differed radically from the elitist, romantic Zelter's Round Table, once it was also based on a democratic statute. Here the generation of young veterans of the World War I gathered, bringing their liberal and patriotic ideas.

=== The (new) Berliner Liedertafel of 1884 ===
In 1884 the new Berlin choral society, established by Adolf Zander, came to existence through a merger of several smaller choirs. The choir counted already with 117 singers by the end of the founding year. In the Wilhelmian Liedertafel era, the Berlin Liedertafel counted with more than 250 singers, being the largest male-voice choir in Germany. The choir took long trips abroad (Austria, Romania, Sweden, France, Baltic states, Italy, Russia, Egypt, the United States, Japan), and along with the Berlin Philharmonic Orchestra it gave great concerts. This society gave rise to another, the Lehrergesangverein of 1886.
