= Adolf Zander =

German musician and choir director (1843–1914)

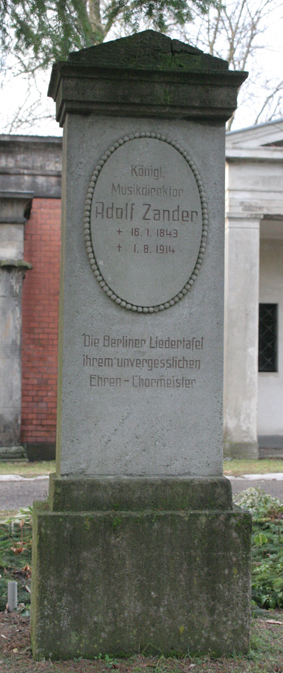
Resting place of Adolf Zander in the old Sophienfriedhof cemetery in Berlin.

Adolf Zander (16 January 1843 – 1 August 1914) was a German composer, organist at the Church of St. Sophia in Berlin, choir director, royal Prussian music director and founder of the new male Berliner Liedertafel choir.

== Life ==
Zander was born in Barnewitz an der Havel (today part of Märkisch Luch). He worked as a musician and teacher, and in particular, he devoted himself to choral music. He founded, in 1881, the "Zander Quartet Society". From 1877 to 1880, he was the second conductor of the Berlin male voice choir "Liederlust", and in 1884 led both choirs together in the new Berlin Liedertafel.

Zander lived in Berlin around 1880 at 26 Höchste Straße, later at 16 Krautstraße, finally about 1895 on Graefestraß'. He died in Kleinaupa, Riesengebirge, aged 71, and was buried on the old Friedhof II der Sophiengemeinde Berlin cemetery in Berlin-Mitte.

== See also ==
- Friedrich Hieronymus Truhn
- Neue Berliner Musikzeitung

== Literature ==
- Literature by and about Adolf Zander in the German National Library catalogue

Attribution

- This article is based on a translation of the article at the German Wikipedia. A list of contributors can be found at de.Wikipedia.org History).
