= Die Eifersüchtigen =

Die Eifersüchtigen is an 1882 German-language comic opera by Joachim Raff to a text by the composer. The story is set in Florence in 1555, with references to Rossini, Mozart and Commedia dell'arte.

Unperformed during the composer's life the Joachim Raff Society, the Zurich Opera Collective gave the first performance to mark the 200th anniversary of the birth of the composer in 2022.

== Recording ==
Matthias Bein, Balduin Schneeberger, Raìsa Ierone, Mirjam Fässler, Serafina Giannoni, Martin Roth, Benjamin Popson Orchestra of Europe, Joonas Pitkänen 2CD Naxos
