= Gustav Reichardt =

German music teacher and composer

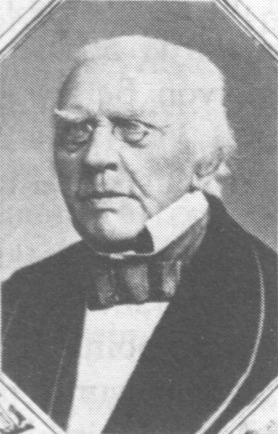
Gustav Reichardt

Gustav Reichardt, also Heinrich Wilhelm Ludwig Gustav Reichardt (13 November 1797 – 18 October 1884), was a 19th-century German music teacher and composer.

== Life and work ==
Gustav Reichardt was born in Schmarsow. He received his first music lessons at the age of five from his father, the versatile educated countryside preacher Rev. Georg Gustav Zacharias Reichardt (1766–1852). Already, at the age of nine, he appeared on violin and piano. From 1809 to 1811, he received music lessons in Neustrelitz and was a violinist in a local Chapel. In 1811, he attended grammar school and then he began studying theology at the University of Greifswald.

In 1818, he moved to the Berlin Academy, but decided to study music in 1819. He became a pupil of Bernhard Klein in music theory and composition. As a member of the Sing-Akademie zu Berlin (1819–1832) he co-founded the Berliner Liedertafel and soon attracted attention due to his well-trained bass voice. He turned entirely to composition and developed a fruitful activity in this area. After a number of years he acted as a singing teacher with extraordinary success. Due to this he began to have access to aristocratic circles and the royal family of Frederick William III of Prussia. As a popular teacher, he taught singing, including to the later Emperor Frederick III. For his wedding in 1858, he composed a cantata festival. In 1850, he was appointed royal music director.

Reichardt's compositions number only thirty-six and they are mostly vocal popular songs, preferably for male choirs. Among them is the song The image of the Rose. Artists such as Felix Mendelssohn Bartholdy and music enthusiasts met regularly at his home. During a visit to the Sněžka in 1825, he set to music the poem Des Deutschen Vaterland by Ernst Moritz Arndt, thus becoming well known in Prussian Berlin circles. The song became one of the hymns of the German unification movement. In 1871, he published under Opus 36 his last work, a national anthem, with lyrics by Müller von der Werra. Reichardt died, aged 87, in Berlin. His final resting place is located after on the southwestern alley of Stahnsdorf South-Western Cemetery.

== Literature ==
- Hans Michael Schletterer, "Reichardt, Gustav". In Allgemeine Deutsche Biographie (ADB). Volume 27, Duncker & Humblot, Leipzig 1888, pp. 622–624.
- "Gustav Reichardt". In Meyers Konversations-Lexikon. 4th Edition. Vol. 13, Bibliographisches Institut, Leipzig 1885-1892, p. 674.
- Gero von Wilcke: Gustav Reichardt, composer of the old German national anthem (for his 100th death anniversary). In Archives for Genealogical Research. 51st Year, No. 98, June 1985, p. 95–96 and 98
