= Symphony No. 5 (Raff) =

19th-century symphony by Joachim Raff

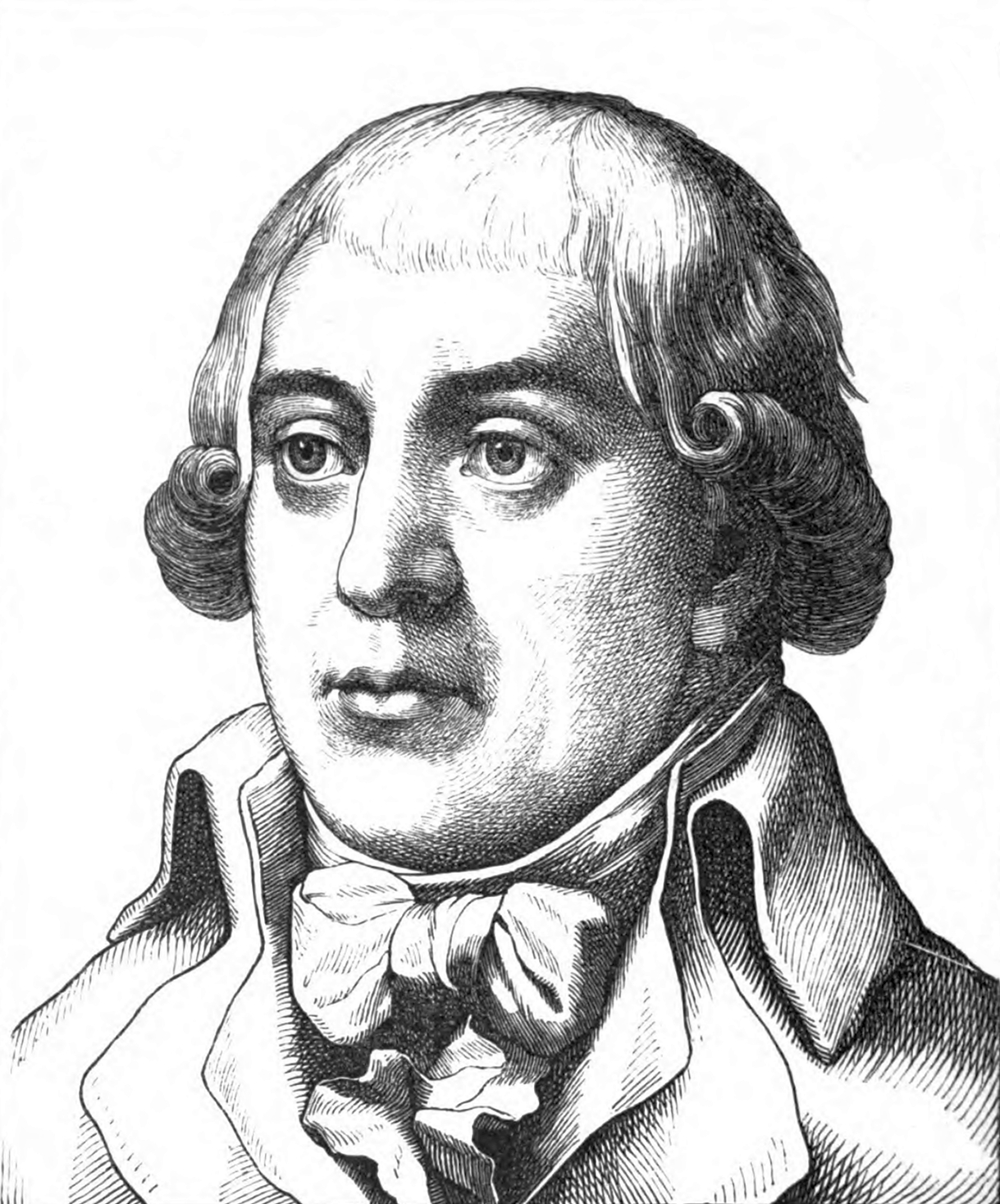
Gottfried August Bürger, author of Lenore

Symphony No. 5 in E major (Lenore), Op. 177, was composed by Joachim Raff between 1870 and 1872. It is generally regarded as his best symphony and the most frequently performed and recorded today. It was inspired by Gottfried August Bürger's ballad Lenore, set during the Seven Years' War.

The symphony came during a time of great success for Raff. He already achieved fame with his Third and Fourth symphonies, as well as the opera Dame Kobold, so the orchestras were eager to perform it. The premiere took place in December 1872 at a private performance in Sonderhausen in front of an audience of 20. The first public performance took place in Berlin the following year and it was very well received. The work was performed in other places in Germany, as well as England and America. Ebenezer Prout reported that at the English premiere "those who were present will remember the sensation created by its performance".

Raff described the symphony's programme: "The happiness of two lovers is interrupted by war. The time has come when he must go forth with his fellow soldiers and she remain behind alone. In this solitude evil forebodings take possession of her; she falls into a fever, in which her hallucinations prepare, in reality, only for her own death".

== Instrumentation ==
The symphony is scored for piccolo, 2 flutes, 2 oboes, 2 clarinets, 2 bassoons, 4 horns, 2 trumpets, 3 trombones, timpani, snare drum, triangle, and strings.

In 1971 Unicorn Records released an LP recording of the symphony played by the London Philharmonic Orchestra conducted by Bernard Herrmann. In 2014 Chandos released a CD recording played by L'Orchestre de la Suisse Romande conducted by Neeme Järvi.

== Structure ==
Just like his Third symphony, the work is structured in three parts and four movements:

Part I: Love's Happiness

I. Allegro (E major)
II. Andante quasi larghetto (A♭ major)

Part II: Parting

III. Marsch Tempo. Agitato (C major)

Part III: Reunited in Death

IV. Allegro (E minor – E major)
