= Benedetto Marcello (opera) =

Lyric opera by Joachim Raff

Benedetto Marcello is a lyric opera by Joachim Raff loosely based on the life of the composer Benedetto Marcello. Unperformed during Raff's life the world premiere performance was given in Metzingen Stadthalle, Bad Urach, Germany, October 4th, 2002.

== Recording ==
Benedetto Marcello Detlef Roth (baritone), Johannes Kalpers (tenor), Melba Ramos (soprano), Margarete Joswig (mezzo) SWR Rundfunkorchester Kaiserslautern, Grzegorz Nowak 2CD Sterling 2020.
