= Benedetto Marcello =

Italian composer and writer (1686–1739)

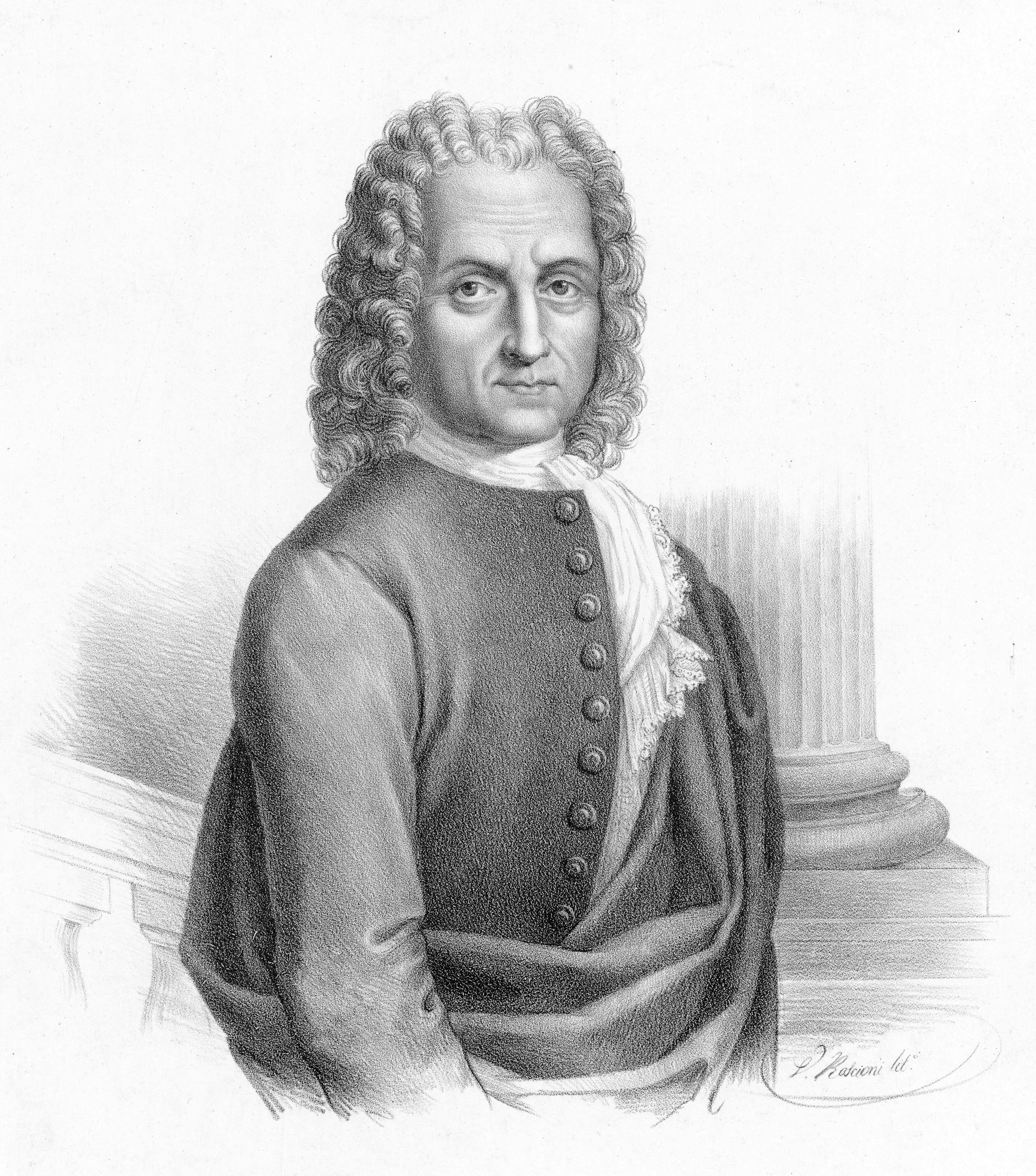
Benedetto Marcello, engraving by Vincenzo Roscioni

Benedetto Giacomo Marcello (Italian: [beneˈdetto marˈtʃɛllo]; 31 July or 1 August 1686 – 24 July 1739) was an Italian composer, writer, lawyer, magistrate, and teacher.

== Life ==
Born in Venice, Benedetto Marcello was a member of the noble Marcello family and in his compositions, he is frequently referred to anonymously as Patrizio Veneto (Venetian patrician, i.e. aristocrat). Although he was a music student of Antonio Lotti and Francesco Gasparini, his father wanted Benedetto to devote himself to law. Benedetto managed to combine a life in law and public service with one in music. In 1711, he was appointed a member of the Council of Forty (in Venice's central government), and in 1730, he went to Pola as Provveditore (district governor). Due to his health having been "impaired by the climate" of Istria, Marcello retired after eight years in the capacity of Camerlengo (chamberlain) to Brescia, where he died of tuberculosis in 1739.

Benedetto Marcello was the brother of Alessandro Marcello, also a notable composer. On 20 May 1728, Benedetto Marcello married his singing student Rosanna Scalfi in a secret ceremony. However, as a nobleman, his marriage to a commoner was unlawful; after his death, the marriage was declared null by the state. Rosanna was unable to inherit his estate and filed suit in 1742 against Benedetto's brother Alessandro, seeking financial support.

== Music ==
Flute Sonata in F major, Op. 2 No. 1
Performed by Albert Tipton (flute) and Mary Norris (piano)

Marcello composed a variety of music including considerable church music, oratorios, hundreds of solo cantatas, duets, sonatas, concertos and sinfonias. Marcello was a younger contemporary of Antonio Vivaldi in Venice and his instrumental music enjoys a Vivaldian flavour.

As a composer, Marcello was best known in his lifetime and is now still best remembered for his Estro poetico-armonico (Venice, 1724–27), a musical setting for voices, figured bass (a continuo notation), and occasional solo instruments, of the first fifty Psalms, as paraphrased in Italian by his friend G. Giustiniani. They were much admired by Charles Avison, who with John Garth brought out an edition with English words (London, 1757). Estro poetico-armonico also represents an important contribution to the history of Jewish liturgical music. Eleven of the Psalms are set to melodies that Marcello apparently transcribed while attending services at several Venetian synagogues. The eleven melodies – six from the Ashkenazic tradition, and five from the Sephardic tradition – are among the earliest notated sources of Jewish liturgy, preceded only by Salamone Rossi's Hashirim Asher L’Shlomo. Perhaps the best known of these melodies is an Ashkenazic melody for Ma'oz Tzur.

The library of the Brussels Conservatoire possesses some interesting volumes of chamber cantatas composed by Marcello for his mistress. Although Benedetto Marcello wrote an opera called La Fede riconosciuta and produced it in Vicenza in 1702, he had little sympathy with this form of composition, as evidenced in his writings (see below).

Benedetto Marcello's music is "characterized by imagination and a fine technique and includes both counterpoint and progressive, galant features".(Grove 1994).

With the poet Antonio Schinella Conti he wrote a series of experimental long cantatas – a duet, Il Timoteo, then five monologues, Cantone, Lucrezia, Andromaca, Arianna abandonnata, and finally Cassandra.

== Writing ==
Marcello vented his opinions on the state of musical drama at the time in the satirical pamphlet Il teatro alla moda, published anonymously in Venice in 1720. This little work, which was frequently reprinted, is not only extremely amusing, but is most valuable as a contribution to the history of opera.

... he directed his satire not against the opera as such but only against the slovenly routine and the abuse that had crept into opera production. He spared nobody and attacked composers, singers, directors alike, down to the last stage hand. The vivid picture he draws would in many ways apply also to the modern operatic "tradition" which according to Gustav Mahler is identical with "Schlamperei" (sloppiness). Marcello presented his vitriolic suggestions in an ostensibly serious tone and revealed by implication more about the musical and social aspects of opera than other authors did by factual reports. The bitterest attacks were leveled against the castrati who visibly embodied the most abusive side of opera. Their singing was derisively called "capon's laughter". Outside of Italy they were sometimes beaten up in the streets, not because of their singing but because of economic jealousy and the social injustices for which they stood.

== Legacy ==
The composer Joachim Raff wrote an opera entitled Benedetto Marcello, based loosely on the life of Marcello and Scalfi.

The Conservatorio di Musica Benedetto Marcello di Venezia was named after him.

A street in Rome, Largo Benedetto Marcello, is named after him.

== Works ==
=== Vocal music ===
==== Oratorios ====
- La Giuditta (premiered in Venice 1709?)
- Joaz (premiered in Venice 1727?, Florence 1729)
- Il pianto e il riso delle quattro stagioni dell’anno per la morte, esultazione e coronazione di Maria Assunta in Cielo (premiered in Macerata 1731)
- Il trionfo della poesia e della musica nel celebrarsi la morte, e la esultazione, e la incoronazione di Maria sempre Vergine Assunta in Cielo (1733, production unknown)

==== Sacred works ====
- Estro poetico-armonico: parafrasi sopra li primi [e secondi] venticinque salmi (translation: G.A. Giustiniani), 8 volumes (Venice 1724–26)
- 9 Masses for 3–8 voices, including a Requiem in G minor
- 30 religious works: 4 Antiphons, 3 Graduals, 1 Hymn, 1 setting of the Lamentations of Jeremiah the Prophet (lost), 1 Lesson for the Holy Week (lost), 2 Magnificats for 3–4 voices, 5 Misereres, 8 motets, 3 Offertories, 2 vespers

==== Theater works ====
- La morte d’Adone (Serenata, premiered in Venice 1710 or 1729)
- La gara amorosa (Serenata, premiered in Venice ca. 1710–12?)
- Psiché (intreccio scenico musicale, Libretto: Vincenzo Cassani, premiered in Venice 1711/12?)
- Spago e Filetta (Intermezzi for the tragedy Lucio Commodo, premiered in Venice 1719?)
- Le nozze di Giove e Giunone (Serenata), 2 versions: Nasce per viver (premiered in Vienna 1725 for Charles VI, Holy Roman Emperor), Questo é ’l giorno (shortened version, premiered in Vienna 1716?)
- Calisto in orsa (Pastorale, Libretto: Carminati?, premiered in 1725?)
- Arianna (intreccio scenico musicale, Libretto: Cassani, premiered in Venice ca. 1727)

==== Other vocal works ====
- [12] Canzoni madrigalesche et [6] arie per camera for 2–4 voices op. 4 (Bologna 1717)
- 380 Cantatas (with Texte often by Marcello himself) for 1 voice and basso continuo, 22 with strings (including Carissima figlia, Didone, Gran tiranno è l’amore, Percorelle che pascete, Senza gran pena)
- 81 duets for 2 voices and basso continuo, 2 with strings (including Timoteo, Clori e Daliso, Clori e Tirsi)
- 7 Trios for 3 voices and basso continuo
- 5 Madrigals for 4–5 voices

=== Instrumental music ===
==== Concerti and sinfonie ====
- 12 Concerti a cinque op. 1 (Venice 1708)
- 5 Concerti for violins, strings and basso continuo (D major, D major, D major, E♭ major, F major)
- Concerto in F major for 2 violins, strings and harpsichord (1716/17)
- Concerto in D major for flute, strings and harpsichord
- 7 sinfonias (D major, F major, G major, G major, A major, A major, B♭ major)

==== Sonatas ====
- 12 Sonatas for flute and basso continuo op. 2 (Venice 1712); incomplete reprint as op. 1 (London 1732)
- 6 sonatas for cello and basso continuo „op. 1“ (Amsterdam ca. 1732); also as op. 2 (London 1732)
- 6 sonatas for 2 cellos or viole da gamba and basso continuo „op. 2“ (Amsterdam ca. 1734)
- Sonata in G minor for violin and basso continuo
- Sonata in B♭ major for cello and basso continuo
- 4 sonatas for flautino (soprano recorder) and basso continuo (C major, G major, G major, G minor; authenticity questioned)

==== Harpsichord works ====
- 12 sonatas for harpsichord op. 3? (Venice ca. 1712–17)
- 35 sonatas and sonata movements for harpsichord
- 4 minuets; Suite with 30 Minuets

=== Selected publications ===
- Fantasia ditirambiva eroicomica (or Volo Pindarico, 1708)
- Lettera famigliare d’un accademico filarmonico et arcade (1716)
- Sonetti: pianger cercai non già dal pianto onore (Venice 1718)
- Il teatro alla moda (Venice 1720)
- A. Dio: Sonetti ... con altre rime, d’argomento sacro e morale (Venice 1731)
- Il divino Verbo fatto Uomo, o sia L’universale redenzione (at least 21 Canti)

== Selected recordings ==
- "Il mio bel foco" (song), with Frederica von Stade (mezzo-soprano) and Martin Katz (piano), CBS, 1982
- Solo cantata Cassandra Kai Wessel (countertenor), David Blunden (harpsichord), Aeon Classics 2010.
- Opera Arianna Chandos 2000
- Requiem in the Venetian Manner. Academia de li Musici, dir. Filippo Maria Bressan, Chandos 1999
- Sonatas for Harpsichord (premiere recording; 2×CD), Roberto Loreggian (harpsichord), "Reconstruction and critical edition" by Alessandro Borin, Chandos 2001
