= Symphony No. 3 (Raff) =

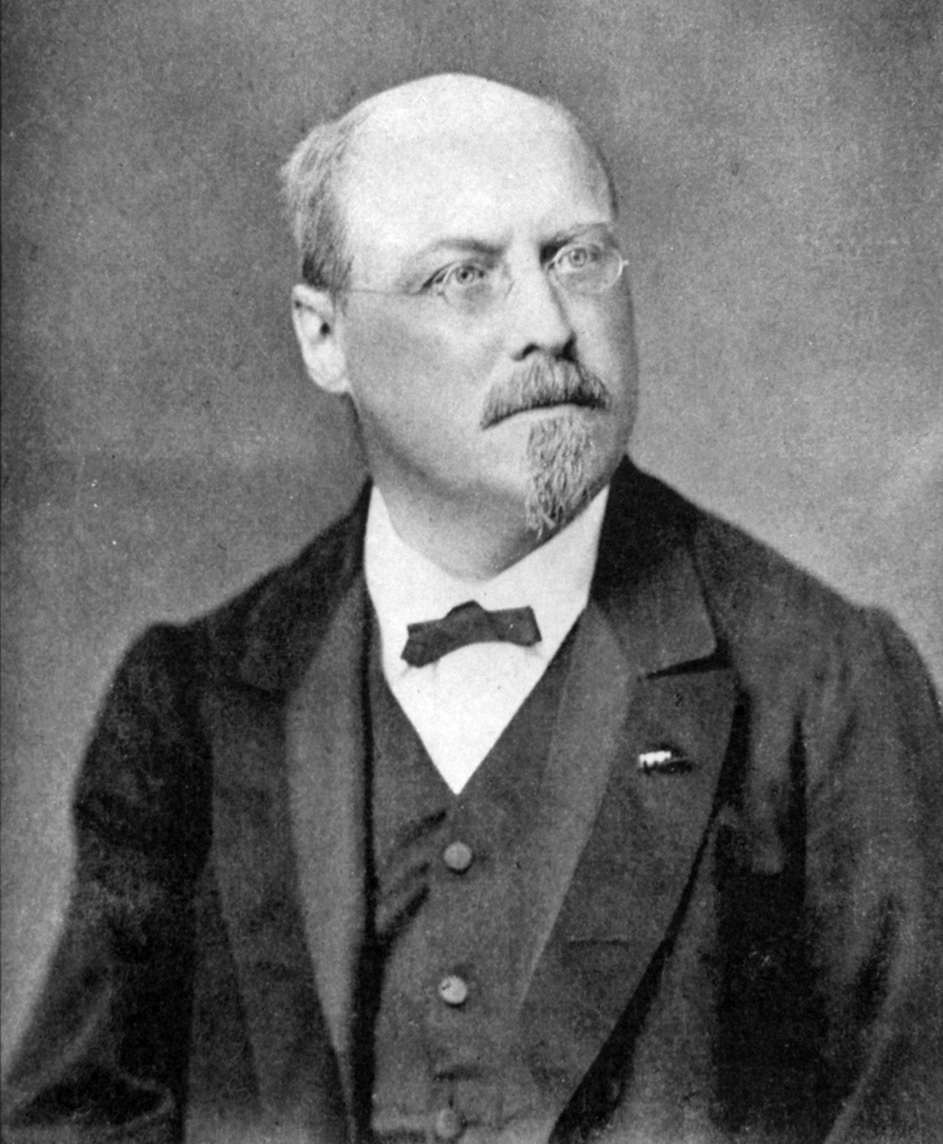
Joachim Raff in 1978

Symphony No. 3 in F major, Im Walde (In the Forest), was composed by Joachim Raff in Wiesbaden in 1869 and was premiered in 1870 in Weimar. Along with his Fifth Symphony, it was one of his most successful and frequently performed works during his lifetime and it earned him a reputation as a symphonist. An American critic named it "the best symphony of modern times" while Hans von Bülow described the symphony's success as "colossal". It was published in 1871 by Kistner of Leipzig. A typical performance lasts for about 45 minutes.

As a Romantic, Raff was deeply inspired by nature. As such, six of his nine programme symphonies are related to nature.

== Music ==
The symphony is scored for piccolo, 2 flutes, 2 oboes, 2 clarinets in B♭, 2 bassoons, 4 horns in F, 2 trumpets in F, 3 trombones, timpani, triangle, and strings.

The symphony is structured in three parts and four movements:

- Part I
  1. Impressions and Feelings: Allegro
- Part II
  2. Dreaming: Largo
  3. Dance of the Dryads: Allegro assai
- Part III
  4. At Night. Stillness of the night in the forest. Entry and departure of the wild hunt, with Lady Holle and Wotan. Day-break: Allegro

== Reception ==
The symphony was enthusiastically received by the audience at that time, spread quickly to England and America and was one of the most played orchestral pieces in the world at the end of the 19th century, which it probably owed to its dramatic musical pictorialism. At the premiere on Easter Sunday, April 17, 1870, in Weimar, a "whirlwind of enthusiasm went through the concert hall" and Raff was "celebrated with frenetic cheers" by the audience. Hans von Bülow described the success of the Third Symphony as "colossal", and an American music critic even called Im Walde "the best symphony of modern times; one of the few who are worth to go into posterity accompanied by the works of Beethoven and Schumann."

The work fell into oblivion together with Raff himself, but it influenced many later composers in their descriptions of nature. In recent years, the symphony has enjoyed some popularity again, measured by increasing sales and new recordings.
