= Ernst Moritz Arndt =

German historian, writer and politician (1769–1860)

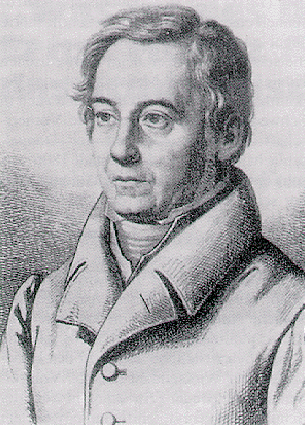
- Born: 26 December 1769; Rügen, Swedish Pomerania, Holy Roman Empire
- Died: 29 January 1860 (aged 90); Bonn, Rhine Province, Kingdom of Prussia
- Occupations: author, poet
- Notable work: Des Deutschen Vaterland

Ernst Moritz Arndt (26 December 1769 – 29 January 1860) was a German nationalist historian, writer and poet. Early in his life, he fought for the abolition of serfdom, later against Napoleonic dominance over Germany. Arndt had to flee to Sweden for some time due to his anti-French positions. He is one of the main founders of German nationalism during the Napoleonic wars and the 19th century movement for German unification. After the Carlsbad Decrees, the forces of the restoration counted him as a demagogue.

Arndt played an important role for the early national and liberal Burschenschaft movement and for the unification movement, and his song "Was ist des Deutschen Vaterland?" acted as an unofficial German national anthem.

== Early life and studies ==
Arndt was born at Gross Schoritz (now a part of Garz on the island of Rügen), then in Swedish Pomerania. He was the son of a prosperous farmer and emancipated serf of the lord of the district, Count Putbus. His mother came of well-to-do German yeoman stock. In 1787 the family moved to Stralsund, where Arndt was able to attend the academy. After an interval of private study he went in 1791 to the University of Greifswald as a student of theology and history, and in 1793 moved to Jena, where he came under the influence of the German idealist philosopher Gottlieb Fichte.

After the completion of his university studies he returned home, and for two years was a private tutor in the family of Ludwig Koscgarten (1758–1818), pastor of Wittow on Rügen, and having qualified for the ministry as a candidate of theology, he assisted in church services. In 1800, he started teaching history at Greifswald.

At the age of 28 he renounced the ministry, and for 18 months led a life of traveling, visiting Austria, Hungary, Italy, France and Belgium. Turning homewards up the river Rhine, he was moved by the sight of the ruined castles along its banks to intense bitterness against France. The impressions of this journey he later described in Travels in parts of Germany, Hungary, Italy and France in 1798 and 1799.

== Opposition to serfdom and Napoleonic rule ==
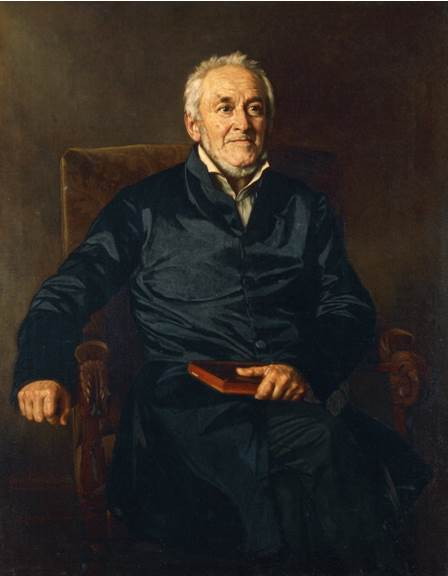
Arndt in his elder years; portrait by Julius Roeting

Originally a supporter of the ideas of the French revolution, Arndt dissociated himself from them when the Reign of Terror of the Jacobins became apparent. When Napoleon began to conquer Europe, this renunciation was transformed into visceral dislike.

In 1800 he taught at the University of Greifswald as an independent lecturer (privatdocent) in history, and the same year published Über die Freiheit der alten Republiken. Germanien und Europa appeared in 1803, a "fragmentary outburst," as he himself called it, on his views on French aggression. This was followed by one of his most influential books, Geschichte der Leibeigenschaft in Pommern und Rügen (Berlin, 1803), a history of serfdom in Pomerania and on Rügen, which was so convincing an indictment that King Gustav IV Adolf of Sweden in 1806 abolished serfdom.

Arndt had meanwhile risen from privatdocent to extraordinary professor, and in 1806 was appointed to the chair of history at the university. In this year he published the first part of his Geist der Zeit, in which he flung down the gauntlet to Napoleon and called on countrymen to rise and shake off the French yoke. So great was the excitement it produced that Arndt was compelled to take refuge in Sweden to escape the vengeance of Napoleon. Settling in Stockholm, he obtained government employment, and devoted himself to the great cause which was nearest his heart. In pamphlets, poems and songs, he communicated his enthusiasm for German independence to his countrymen. Schill's heroic death at Stralsund prompted him to return to Germany, and in disguise he reached Berlin in December.

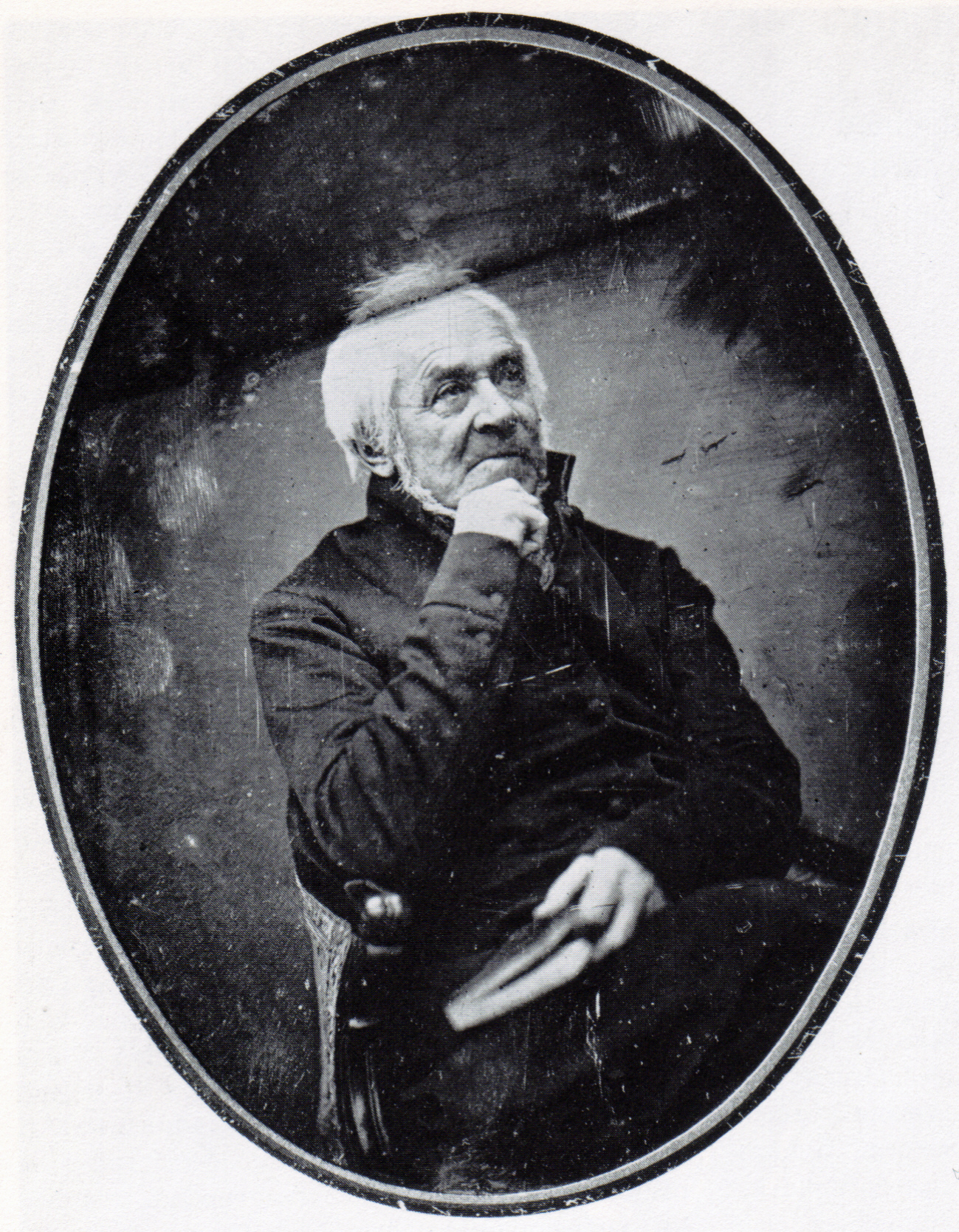
Arndt in 1848

In 1810 he returned to Greifswald, but only for a few months. He again set out on his adventurous travels, lived in close contact, with notable men of his time, such as Gebhard Leberecht von Blücher, August von Gneisenau and Heinrich Friedrich Karl Stein, and in 1812 was summoned by the last named to St Petersburg to assist in the organization of the final struggle against France. Meanwhile, pamphlet after pamphlet, and his stirring patriotic songs, such as Was ist des Deutschen Vaterland?, Der Gott, der Eisen wachsen ließ, and Was blasen Trompeten? became widely popular. Composers such as Pauliine Volkstein also set his texts to music.

When, after the peace, the University of Bonn was founded in 1818, Arndt was appointed to teach from his Geist der Zeit, in which he criticized the particularist policies of the German principalities. The boldness of his demands for reform offended the Prussian government, and in the summer in 1819 he was arrested and his papers confiscated. Although speedily liberated, he was in the following year, at the behest of the Central Commission of Investigation at Mainz – established in accordance with the reactionary Carlsbad Decrees – arraigned before a special tribunal. Although not found guilty, he was forbidden to exercise the functions of his professorship, although he was allowed to retain the stipend. The next 20 years he passed in retirement and literary activity.

In 1840 he was reinstated in his professorship, and in 1841 was chosen rector of the university. The revolutionary outbreak of 1848 rekindled in the venerable patriot his old hopes and energies, and he took seat as one of the deputies to the National Assembly at Frankfurt. He participated in the deputation that offered the Imperial crown to Frederick William IV, and was indignant at the king's refusal to accept it, so he retired from public life. He continued to lecture and to write with freshness and vigor, and on his 90th birthday received from all parts of Germany good wishes and tokens of affection. He died at Bonn in January 1860, and was buried in Bonn's Alter Friedhof. There are monuments to his memory at Schoritz on Rügen, at the University of Greifswald, and in Bonn.

Arndt was married twice, first in 1800, his wife dying in the following year; a second time in 1817. His youngest son drowned in the Rhine in 1834.

== Ethnocentrism and attitude towards different ethnicities ==
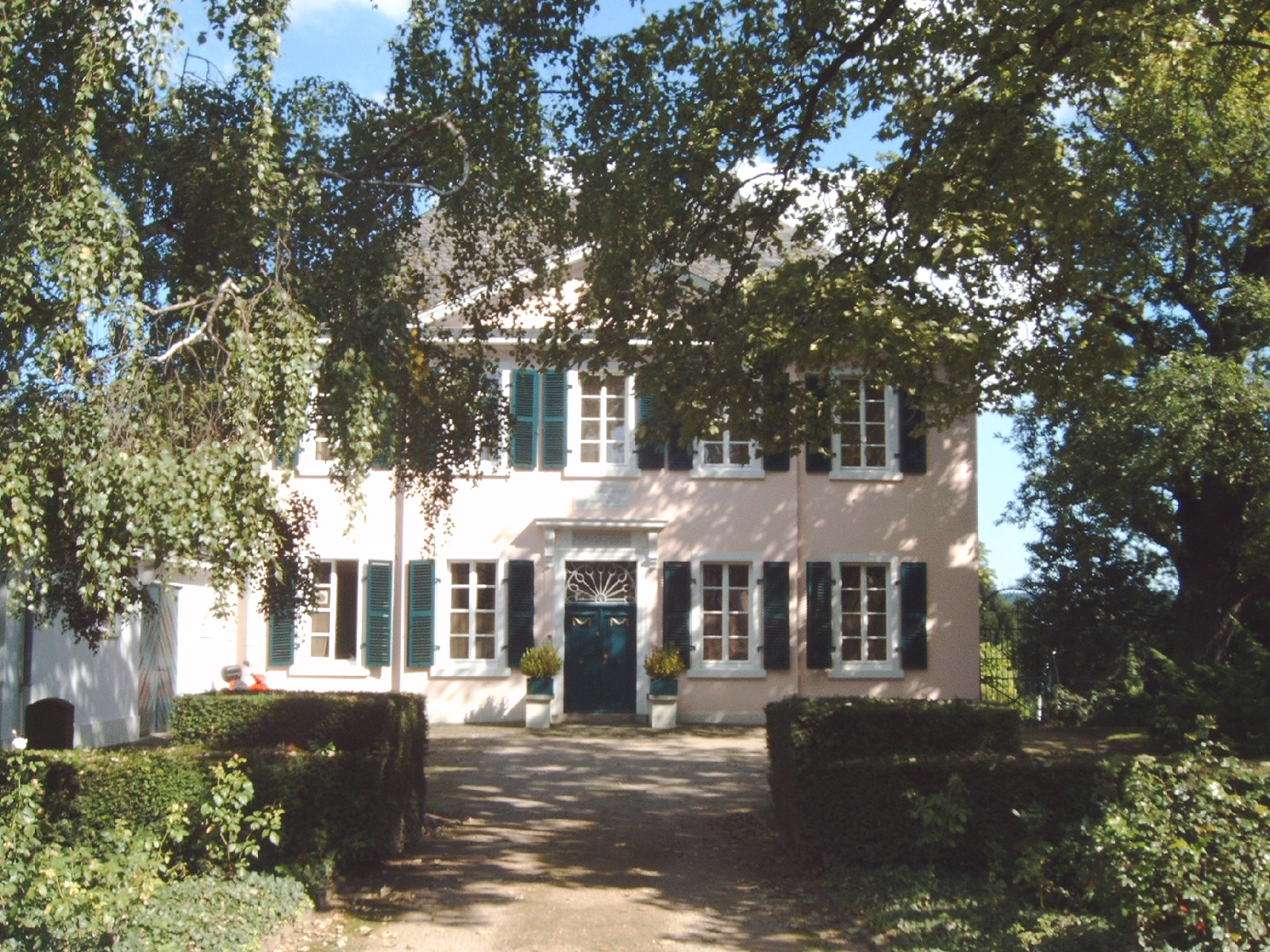
Arndt's home in Bonn following 1819

Like Fichte and Jahn, Arndt began to envision the German nation as a society of ethnic homogeneity, drawing on the history of the German people, especially in the Middle Ages. His writings lack a specific political program, but instead cite external enemies. While "freedom" is often mentioned, the freedom Arndt envisioned was not that of a pluralistic society, but rather of a romanticized national community. The French are denigrated as weakened, womanish and morally depraved, while supposed German virtues are extolled.

"The Germans have not been bastardized by foreign peoples, have not become half-breeds, they more than many other peoples have remained in their native state of purity."

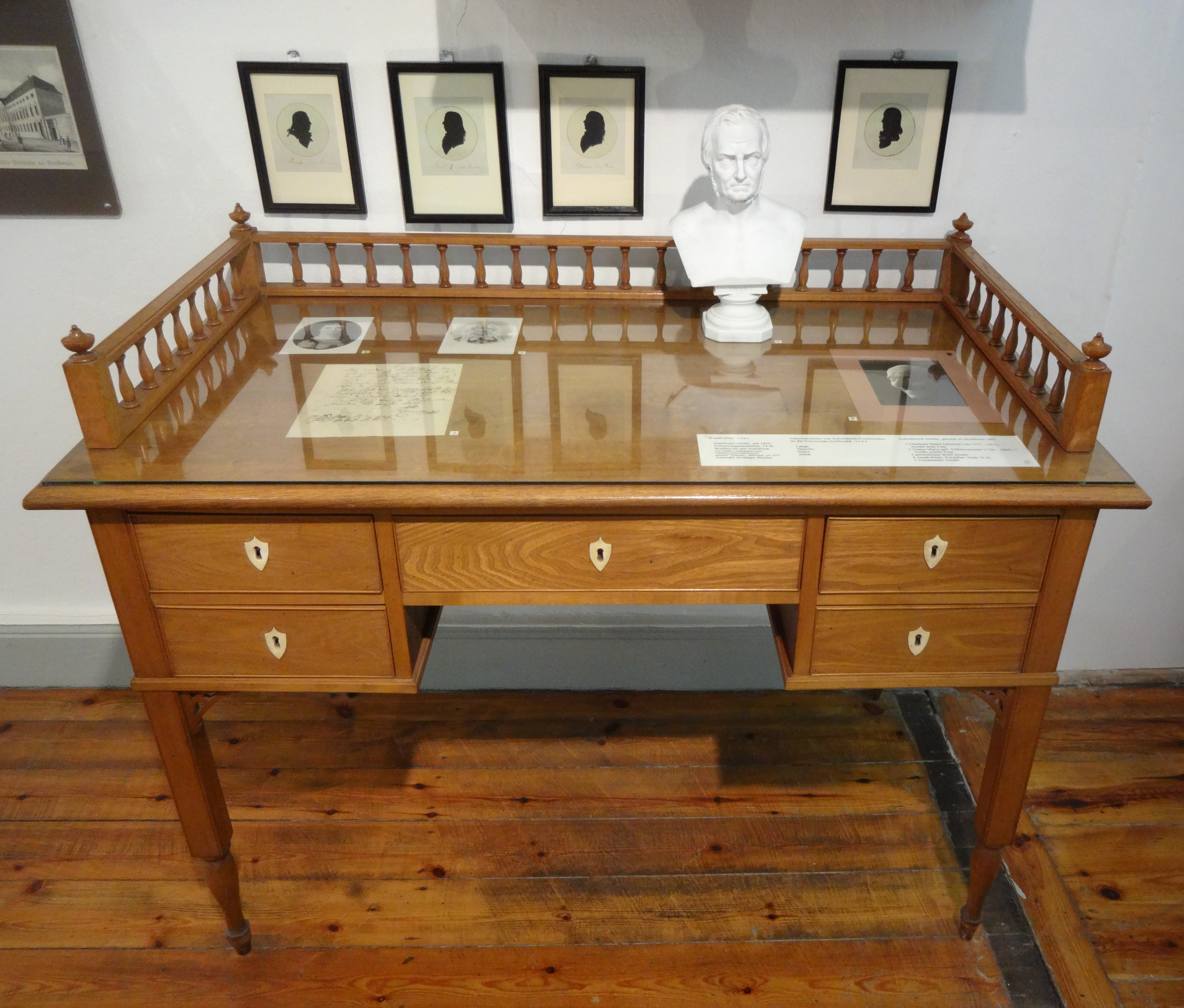
Arndt's desk, Stralsund

These ideas led Arndt to generate anti-French propaganda during the Napoleonic conquest of the German states:

"When I say I hate the French carelessness, I despise the French daintiness, I disapprove of the French loquacity and flightiness, I may pronounce a flaw, but it is a flaw that I share with all my people. I could likewise say I hate the English presumption, the English prudery, the English seclusiveness. These hated, despised, dispraised characteristics are not yet vices as such, from the peoples that they represent they may come with great virtues which I and my people are lacking. Therefore ... let us hate our Frenchmen, the infamizers and destroyers of our power and virginity, even more, now that we feel how they weaken and enervate our virtue and strength."

Arndt also was prejudiced against Poles and other Slavs, and published an anti-Polish pamphlet in 1831 in which he castigated Polish "barbarity and wildness". During the liberal Revolution of 1848, when the issue of reviving the Polish state was raised in Frankfurt, Arndt declared that "tribes" of Slavs and Wends "have never done or been able to do anything lasting with respect to state, science, or art," and concluded: "At the outset I assert with world history that pronounces judgment [that] the Poles and the whole Slavonic tribe are inferior to Germans."

He also warned of close contact with Judaism. He warned of the "thousands [of Jews] which by the Russian tyranny will now come upon us even more abounding from Poland" – "the impure flood from the East". Moreover, he warned of a Jewish intellectual conspiracy, claiming that Jews had "usurped" half of literature.

Arndt paired his antisemitism with his anti-French views, calling the French "the Jewish people" ("das Judenvolk"), or "refined bad Jews" ("verfeinerte schlechte Juden"). In 1815 he wrote of the French: "Jews... I call them again, not only for their Jewish lists and their penny-pinching avarice, but even more because of their Jew-like sticking together."

== Works ==
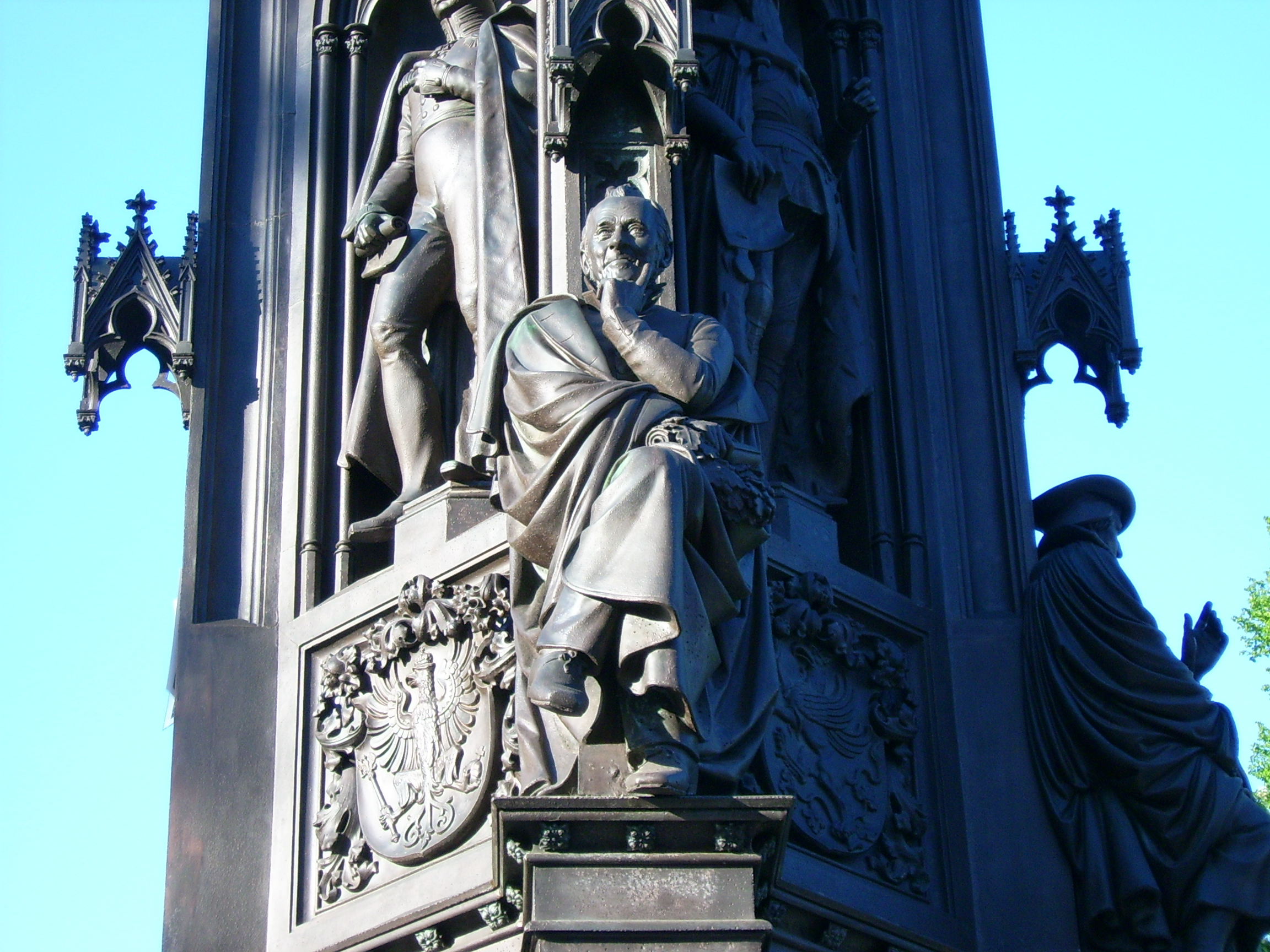
Monument in front of the University of Greifswald depicting of Ernst Moritz Arndt

Works related to Ernst Moritz Arndt at Wikisource

=== Poems and songs ===
Arndt's lyric poems are not all confined to politics. Many among the Gedichte are religious pieces.This is a selection of his best-known poems and songs:

- Sind wir vereint zur guten Stunde ("When we are united in happy times")
- Was ist des Deutschen Vaterland? ("What is the fatherland of the Germans?")
- What is the German's Fatherland? German Classics 1900 William Cleaver Wilkinson
- Vaterlandslied (Arndt), better known as Der Gott, der Eisen wachsen ließ ("The god who let iron grow") Melody written by Albert Methfessel (1785–1869).
- Zu den Waffen, zu den Waffen ("To arms, to arms")
- Kommt her, ihr seid geladen (Come here, you are invited), EG 213 (No. 213 in the current German Protestant hymnal Evangelisches Gesangbuch)
- Ich weiß, woran ich glaube ("I know what I believe in", EG 357)
- Die Leipziger Schlacht ("The Battle of Leipzig", Deutsches Lesebuch für Volksschulen (German reader for elementary schools))

=== Other selected works ===
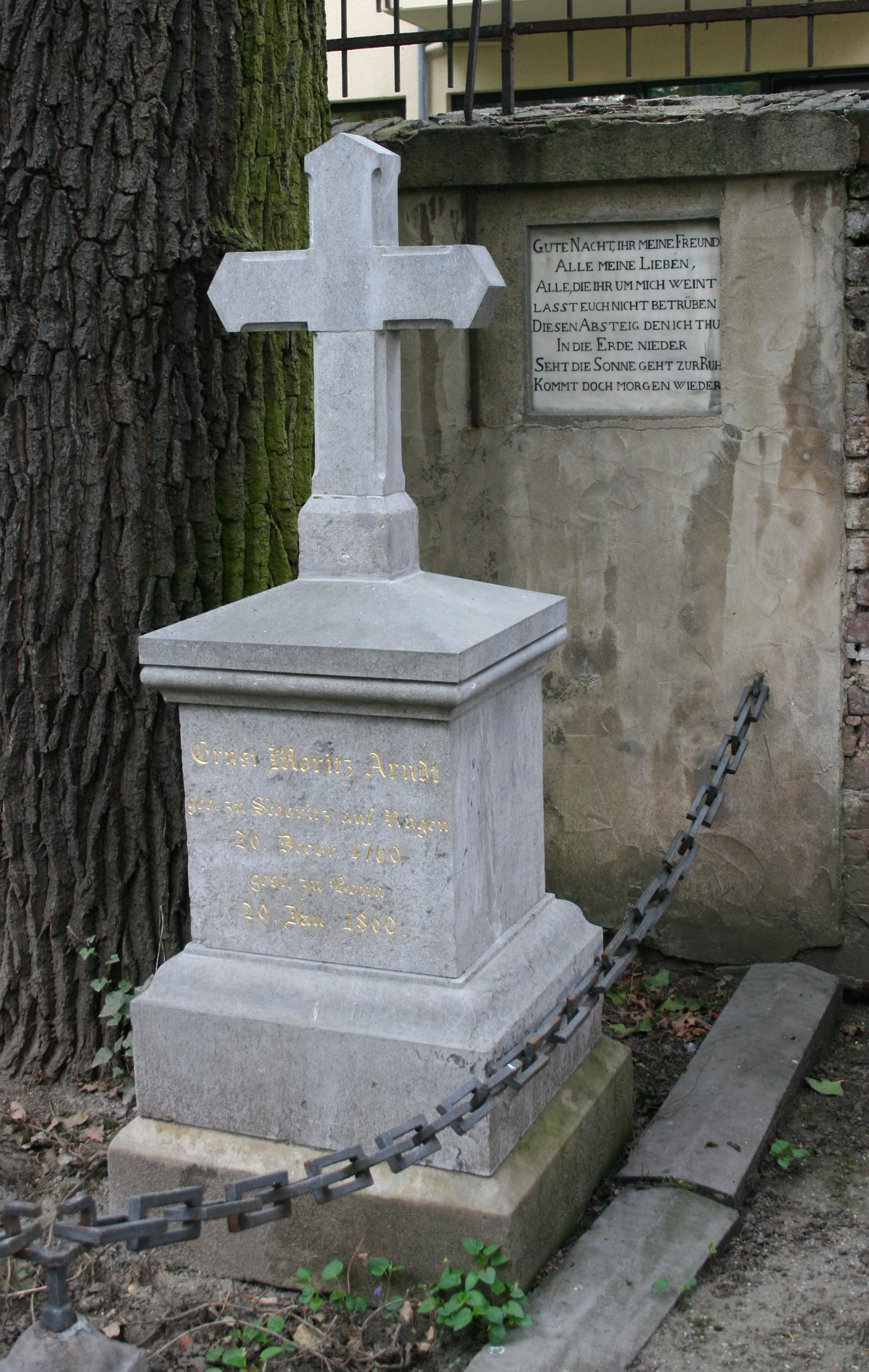
Arndt's grave in the Old Cemetery in Bonn

- Reise durch Schweden ("Voyage through Sweden", 1797)
- Mährchen und Jugenderinnerungen (1818), a collection of folktales.
- Nebenstunden, Beschreibung und Geschichte der Shetländischen Inseln und Orkaden ("Description and history of the Shetland and Orkney Islands", 1820)
- Die Frage über die Niederlande ("The Netherlands question", 1831)
- Erinnerungen aus dem äusseren Leben (1840) An autobiography, and the most valuable source of information for Arndt's life. This is the basis of E. M. Seeley's Life and Adventures of E. M. Arndt (1879)
- Rhein- und Ahrwanderungen ("Peregrinations along the Rhine and Ahr", 1846)
- Meine Wanderungen und Wandlungen mit dem Reichsfreiherrn Heinrich Carl Friedrich vom Stein ("My peregrinations and metamorphoses together with Reichsfreiherr Heinrich Carl Friedrich vom Stein", 1858)
- Pro populo germanico (1854) Originally intended to form the fifth part of the Geist der Zeit.

== Biographies ==
- Schenkel (Elberfeld, 1869)
- E. Langenberg (Bonn, 1869)
- Wilhelm Baur (Hamburg, 1882)
- H. Meisner and R. Geerds, E. M. Arndt, Ein Lebensbild in Briefen (1898)
- R. Thiele, E. M. Arndt (1894).

== See also ==
- Greifswald
- Ernst Moritz Arndt Tower
- Ernst Moritz Arndt University of Greifswald (old German university named after him until 2018)
- List of German-language authors
