= Symphony No. 2 (Raff) =

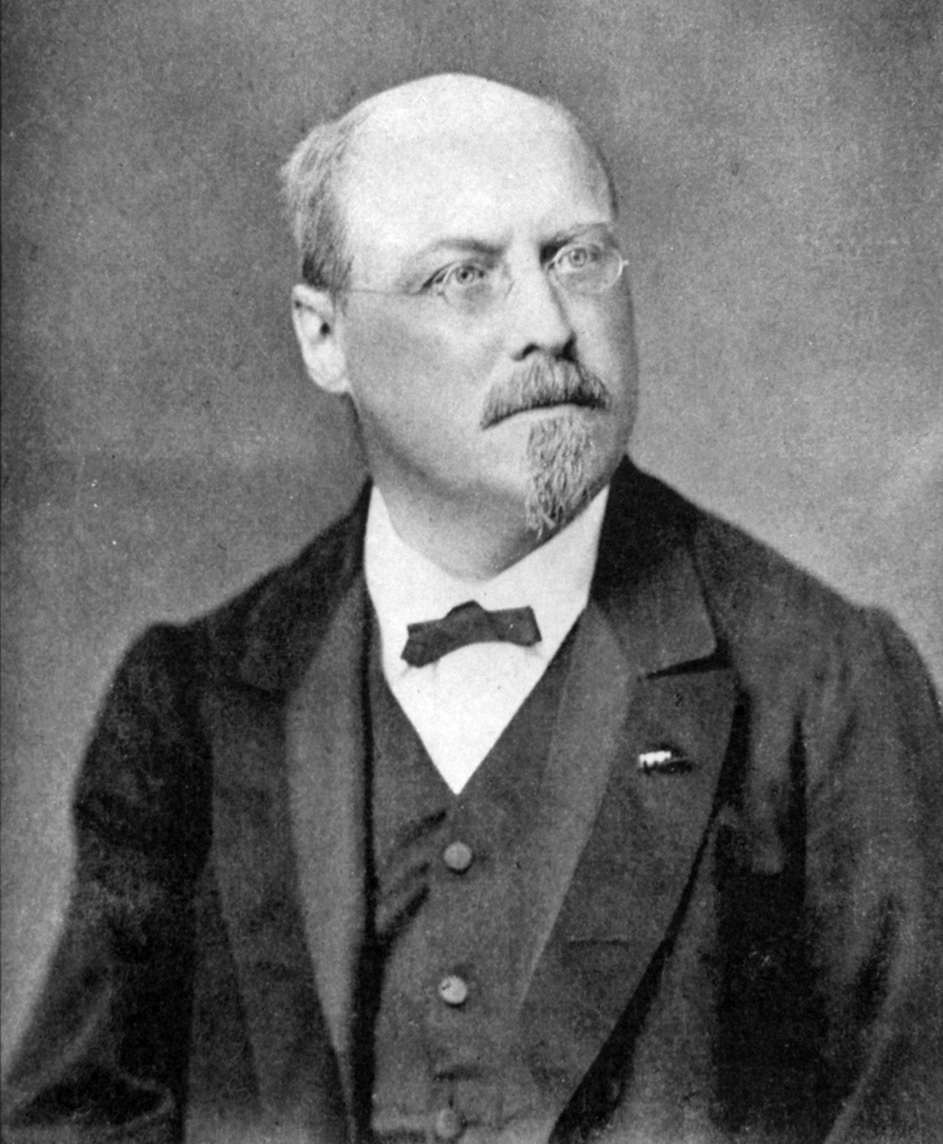
Joachim Raff in 1978

Symphony No. 2 in C major, Op. 140, was composed by Joachim Raff in Weimar in 1866. It is one of the three Raff symphonies that does not carry a descriptive title. It is dedicated to Ernest II, Duke of Saxe-Coburg and Gotha. It was premiered in Weimar in 1867 and was published two years later in Mainz. A few years later the symphony received its second performance in the Leipzig Gewandhaus under Raff's baton. A typical performance lasts for about 37 minutes.

== Music ==
The symphony is scored for piccolo, 2 flutes, 2 oboes, 2 clarinets in B♭, 2 bassoons, 4 horns in F, 2 trumpets in F, trombone, bass trombone, timpani, and strings.

The symphony is structured in four movements:

1. Allegro
2. Andante con moto
3. Allegro vivace
4. Andante maestoso. Allegro con spirito
