= Joachim Raff =

German-Swiss composer and pianist (1822–1882)

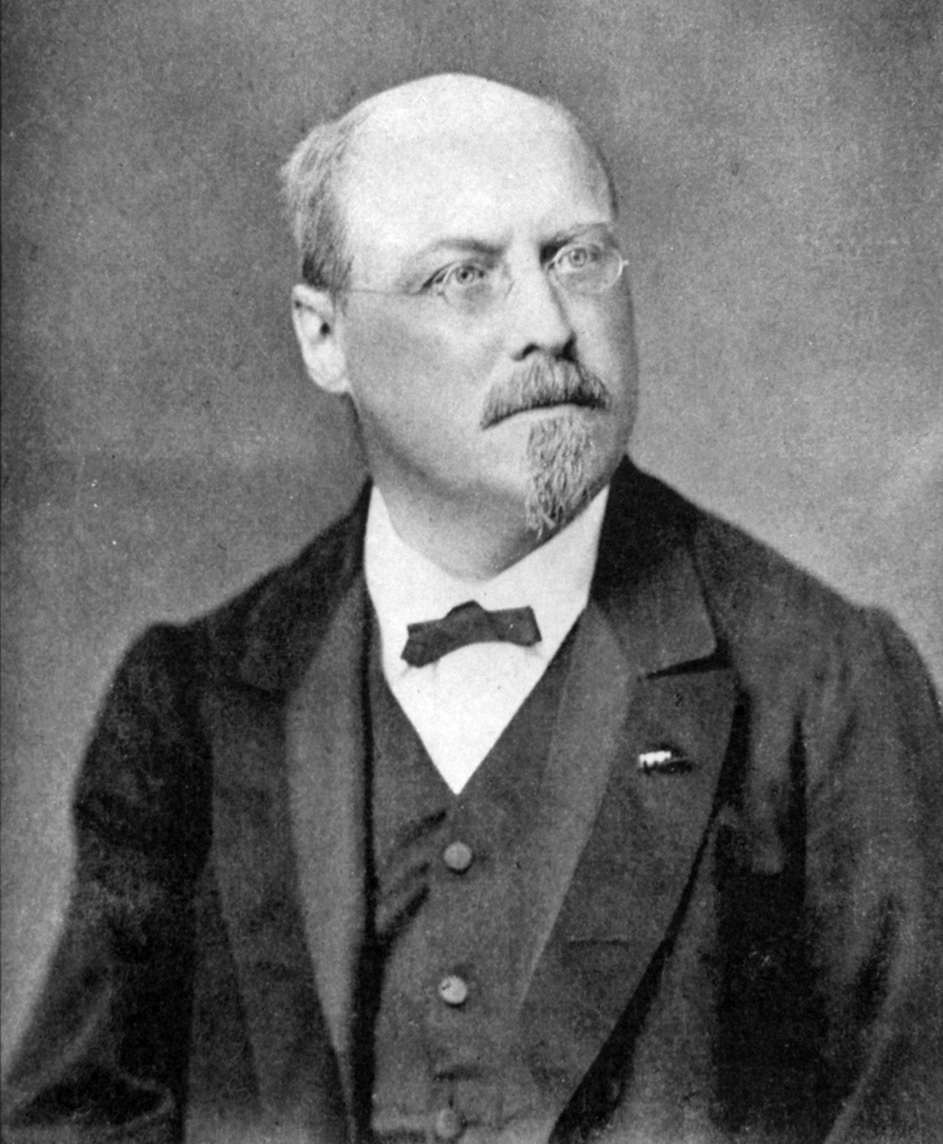
- Raff in 1878, published in John Knowles Paine's Famous Composers, Vol. 2, 1891
- Born: 27 May 1822; Lachen, Switzerland
- Died: 25 June 1882 (aged 60); Frankfurt, German Empire
- Occupations: Composer; Pianist; Music teacher
- Works: List of compositions

Joseph Joachim Raff (27 May 1822 – 24 or 25 June 1882) was a Swiss composer, pedagogue and pianist.

== Biography ==
Raff was born in Lachen in Switzerland. His father, a teacher, had fled there from Württemberg in 1810 to escape forced recruitment into the military of that southwestern German state that had to fight for Napoleon in Russia. Joachim was largely self-taught in music, studying the subject while working as a schoolmaster in Schmerikon, Schwyz and Rapperswil. He sent some of his piano compositions to Felix Mendelssohn who recommended them to Breitkopf & Härtel for publication. They were published in 1844 and received a favourable review in Robert Schumann's journal, the Neue Zeitschrift für Musik, which prompted Raff to go to Zürich and take up composition full-time.

In 1845, Raff walked to Basel to hear Franz Liszt play the piano. After a period in Stuttgart where he became friends with the conductor Hans von Bülow, he worked as Liszt's assistant at Weimar from 1850 to 1853. During this time he helped Liszt in the orchestration of several of his works, claiming to have had a major part in orchestrating the symphonic poem Tasso. In 1851, Raff's opera König Alfred was staged in Weimar, and five years later he moved to Wiesbaden where he largely devoted himself to composition. From 1878 he was the first Director of, and a teacher at, the Hoch Conservatory in Frankfurt. There he employed Clara Schumann and a number of other eminent musicians as teachers, and established a class specifically for female composers. (This was at a time when women composers were not taken seriously.) His pupils there included Edward MacDowell, Olga Radecki, and Alexander Ritter. See: List of music students by teacher: R to S#Joachim Raff.

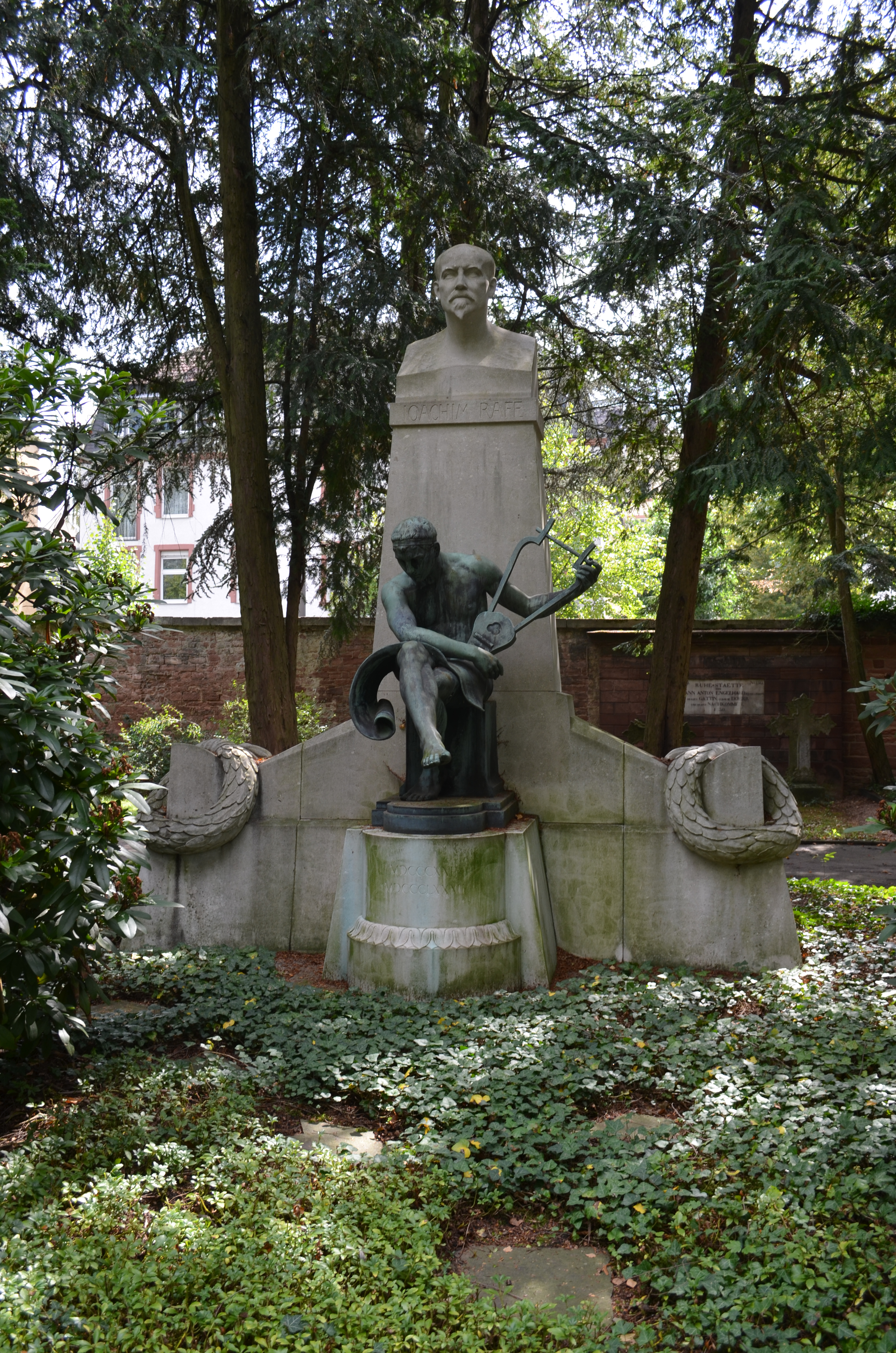
Grave of Joachim Raff in Frankfurt Main Cemetery, Gewann D 298

He died in Frankfurt on the night of June 24/25, 1882. His tomb is in Frankfurt Main Cemetery.

== Compositions ==
Raff's cavatina (3:09)
This cavatina for violin and piano (Op. 85) performed in 1920, violin solo by Elias Breeskin (1896-1969), pianoforte by Rudolph Gruen (1900-1966)

Raff was very prolific, and by the end of his life was one of the best known German composers, though his work is largely forgotten today. (Only one piece, a cavatina for violin and piano, is performed with any regularity today, sometimes as an encore.) He drew influence from a variety of sources - his eleven symphonies, for example, combine the Classical symphonic form, with the Romantic penchant for program music and contrapuntal orchestral writing which harks back to the Baroque. Most of these symphonies carry descriptive titles including In the Forest (No. 3), Lenore (No. 5) and To the Fatherland (No. 1), a very large-scale work lasting around seventy minutes. His last four symphonies make up a quartet of works based on the four seasons. A complete cycle of all his symphonies and many other orchestral works was recorded in the early 2000s by the Bamberg Symphony under Hans Stadlmair.

Raff's Symphony No. 3 "In the Forest" was enthusiastically received by the audience at that time, spread quickly to England and America and was one of the most played orchestral pieces in the world at the end of the 19th century. It fell into oblivion together with Raff himself, but influenced many later romantic composers including Tchaikovsky in his famous "Pathétique" for example. Arturo Toscanini conducted some performances of the symphony in 1931.

The Lenore symphony (No. 5), famous in its time, was inspired by a ballad of the same name by Gottfried August Bürger that also inspired works by several other composers, including Maria Theresia von Paradis (1789), Henri Duparc, Franz Liszt (late 1850s, mentioned by Alan Walker in his Liszt biography vol. 2), for example. The world premiere recording of Lenore was made in 1970 by the London Philharmonic Orchestra conducted by Bernard Herrmann, who championed Raff's orchestral music. He described it as "one of the finest examples of the Romantic Programme School - it deserves a place alongside the Symphonie fantastique of Berlioz, Liszt's Faust Symphony and the Manfred Symphony of Tchaikovsky".

Richard Strauss was a pupil of Hans von Bülow, a friend of Raff's, and it has been said that Strauss was influenced in his early works by Raff. For example, Raff's Symphony No. 7 In the Alps (1877) could have been an inspiration to Strauss's An Alpine Symphony (1915). Much of Raff's music has been said to forecast the early works of Jean Sibelius.

Raff also composed in most other genres, including concertos, opera, chamber music and works for solo piano. His chamber works include five violin sonatas, a cello sonata, a piano quintet, two piano quartets, eight string quartets, a string sextet and four piano trios. Many of these works are now commercially recorded. He also wrote numerous suites, some for smaller groups (there are suites for piano solo and suites for string quartet), some for orchestra and one each for piano and orchestra and violin and orchestra.

Hear Ossip Gabrilowitsch play Rigaudon, Op. 204, No. 3 by Raff (Welte-Mignon recording # D296) on a 1921 Baldwin C, 6'2" Welte-Mignon Reproducing Piano.

== Works ==
=== Symphonies ===
- Große Symphonie, WoO. 18 (before 1860; lost, scherzo and finale included in the Orchestral Suite No. 1, Op. 101)
- Symphony No. 1 in D major, Op. 96 "An das Vaterland" (1859–61)
- Symphony No. 2 in C major, Op. 140 (1866)
- Symphony No. 3 in F major, Op. 153 "Im Walde" (1869)
- Symphony No. 4 in G minor, Op. 167 (1871)
- Symphony No. 5 in E major, Op. 177 "Lenore" (1870–72)
- Symphony No. 6 in D minor, Op. 189 "Gelebt, Gestrebt, Gelitten, Gestritten, Gestorben, Umworben" (1874)
- Symphony No. 7 in B♭ major, Op. 201 "In den Alpen" (1875)
- Symphony No. 8 in A major, Op. 205 "Frühlingsklänge" (1876)
- Symphony No. 9 in E minor, Op. 208 "Im Sommer" (1878)
- Symphony No. 10 in F minor, Op. 213 "Zur Herbstzeit" (1879)
- Symphony No. 11 in A minor, Op. 214 "Der Winter" (1876, unfinished; completed by Max Erdmannsdörfer)

=== Concertos ===
- Konzertstück "La Fée d'amour", for violin and orchestra Op. 67 (1854)
- Konzertstück "Ode au printemps" in G major, for piano and orchestra, Op. 76 (1857)
- Violin Concerto No. 1, Op. 161 (1870–71)
- Suite for Violin and Orchestra, Op. 180 (1873)
- Piano Concerto in C minor, Op. 185 (1873)
- Cello Concerto No. 1, Op. 193 (1874)
- Suite for Piano and Orchestra in E♭, Op. 200 (1875)
- Cello Concerto No. 2, WoO. 45 (1876)
- Violin Concerto No. 2, Op. 206 (1877)

=== Orchestral suites ===
- Suite for Orchestra No. 1, Op. 101 (1863)
- Italian Suite for Orchestra in E minor, WoO. 35 (1871)
- Suite for Orchestra No. 2 in F major "In ungarischer Weise", Op. 194 (1874)
- Suite for Orchestra Aus Thüringen, WoO. 46 (1877)

=== Opera ===
- König Alfred, heroic opera in four acts (Weimar, 9 March 1851)
- Samson, musical drama in five acts (Weimar, 11 March 2022)
- Dame Kobold, comic opera in three acts (Weimar, 1870)
- Die Parole, comic opera in three acts (not performed)
- Benedetto Marcello, lyric opera in three acts, loosely on the life of the composer Benedetto Marcello (first concert performance, Metzingen 2002)
- Die Eifersüchtigen, opera in three acts (Arth (CH), 3 September 2022)

=== Other orchestral works ===
- Orchestral pieces, Op. 85
- Jubilee overture, Op. 103 (1864)
- Festival overture, Op. 117 1864)
- Concert overture, Op. 123 (1862)
- Eine feste Burg ist unser Gott, Ouvertüre zu einem Drama aus dem Dreißigjährigen Krieg (A mighty fortress is our God", Overture to a drama about the Thirty Years' War), Op. 127 (1854; revised 1865)
- Rhapsody for Orchestra "Abends", Op. 163b
- Festival March, Op. 139
- Sinfonietta, Op. 188
- Elegy for Orchestra, WoO. 48
- Orchestral Prelude to Shakespeare's "The Tempest", WoO. 50
- Orchestral Prelude to Shakespeare's "Macbeth", WoO. 51
- Orchestral Prelude to Shakespeare's "Romeo and Juliet", WoO. 52
- Orchestral Prelude to Shakespeare's "Othello", WoO. 53
- Grand Fugue for Orchestra, WoO. 57
- Overture to Benedetto Marcello
- Overture to Dame Kobold, Op. 154
- Overture to Die Parole
- Orchestration of Bach's Chaconne from Violin Partita No. 2

=== Chamber music ===
- String Quartet No. 1, Op. 77
- String Quartet No. 2, Op. 90
- Suite in D minor for solo piano Op. 91
- Piano Trio No. 1, Op. 102
- Piano Quintet, Op. 107
- Piano Trio No. 2, Op. 112
- String Quartet No. 3, Op. 135
- String Quartet No. 4, Op. 136
- String Quartet No. 5, Op. 137
- Piano Trio No. 3, Op. 155
- Piano Trio No. 4, Op. 158
- String Octet, Op. 176
- String Sextet, Op. 178
- Sinfonietta for 10 Wind Instruments, Op. 188 (2fl, 2ob, 2cl, 2bn, 2hn)
- String Quartet No. 6, Op. 192 No. 1 "Suite in Ancient Style"
- String Quartet No. 7, Op. 192 No. 2 "The Maid of the Mill" [Die Schöne Müllerin]
- String Quartet No. 8, Op. 192 No. 3 "Suite in Canon Form"
- Piano Quartet No. 1, Op. 202 No. 1
- Piano Quartet No. 2, Op. 202 No. 2
- Fantasy for Piano Quintet, Op. 207a
