= Stahnsdorf South-Western Cemetery =

Large church operated cemetery in Germany

Südwestkirchhof Stahnsdorf
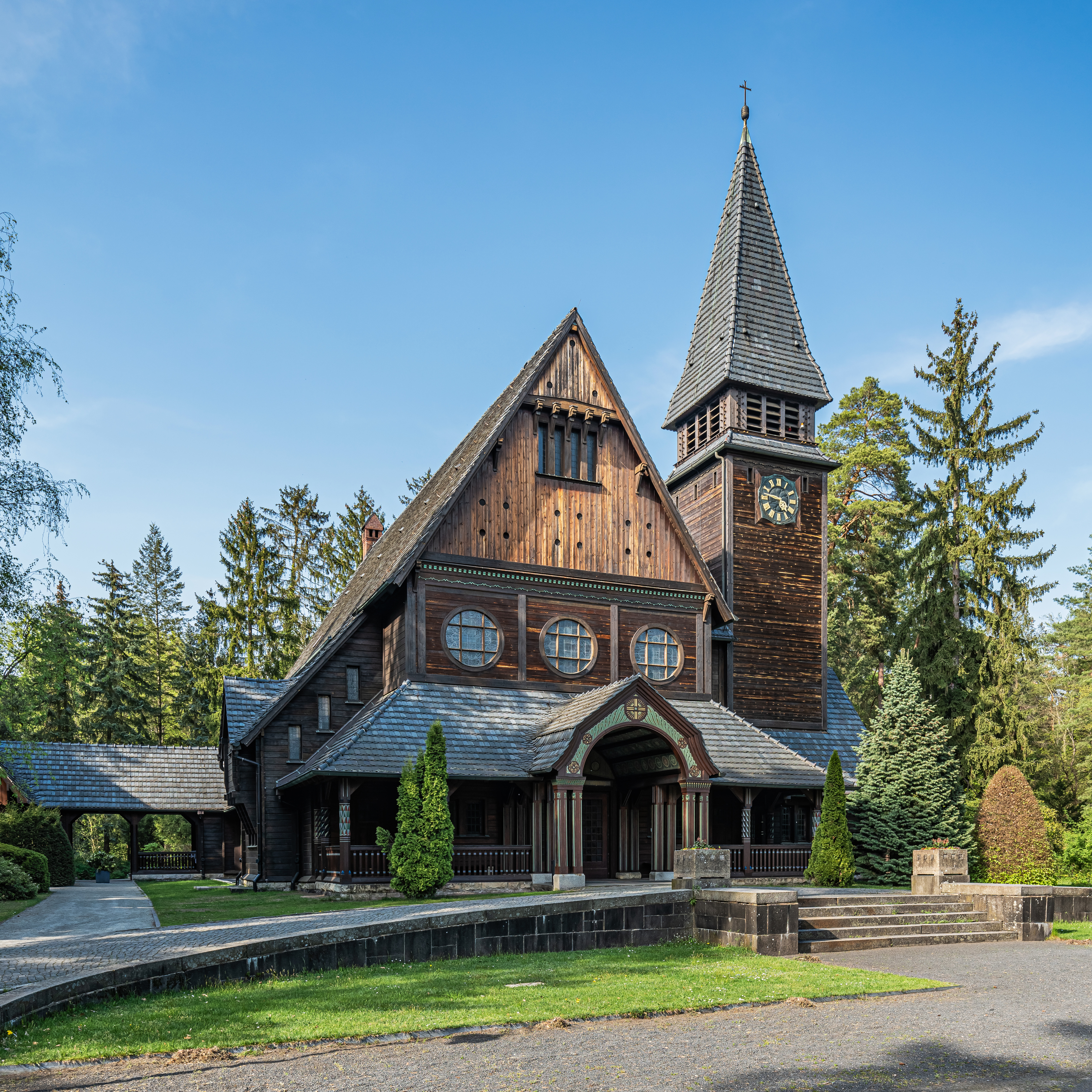
- Designated landmark wooden chapel of the Southwest Cemetery in Stahnsdorf
- Interactive map of Südwestkirchhof Stahnsdorf

Details
- Established: 1909
- Location: Stahnsdorf
- Country: Germany
- Coordinates: 52.388889°N 13.180556°E
- Type: Protestant cemetery
- Owned by: Evangelical Church in Berlin, Brandenburg and Silesian Upper Lusatia
- Size: 206 ha (510 acres)
- No. of interments: +120,000
- Website: The official website

The Stahnsdorf South-Western Cemetery (German: Südwestfriedhof Stahnsdorf der Berliner Synode) is a Protestant rural cemetery in Germany. Established in 1909, the cemetery is located in the municipality of Stahnsdorf in Potsdam-Mittelmark district, Berlin/Brandenburg Metropolitan Region. With a land area of approximately 206 hectares (510 acres), it is the largest church-owned Christian cemetery in Germany, as well as being the tenth largest cemetery in the world and Germany's second largest cemetery after Hamburg's Ohlsdorf Cemetery. The cemetery is operated by the administration of the Berlin City Protestant Synod Association. Due to its status as one of the most important landscape parks in the Berlin metropolitan area, along with the large amount of historically valuable tombs and other buildings which include the landmark wooden chapel, the cemetery was designated as a place of special importance and a protected area by the state of Brandenburg in 1982.

== History and description ==
In the second half of the 19th century, it became clear that due to industrialization, Berlin's population growth would eventually increase to such an extent that the existing Protestant parish burial grounds would prove to be insufficient to cope with the increasing mortality rates. It was decided by Berlin City Synodal Association, comprising parishes of the Protestant Church of the older provinces of Prussia in Berlin and the surrounding area, that a large cemetery on the outskirts should have to be established and finally acquired a large piece of land outside the city limits which included an area of around 156 hectares in size, partly covered with pine trees in a wooded area, in the southwest of Berlin, between the Parforceheide forests in the north and west, the new Potsdamer Landstrasse in the south and the municipality of Stahnsdorf in the east. The cemetery was consecrated on March 28, 1909, and the first burial took place on April 8; a retired teacher named Elisabeth Wenzlewski. The landmark wooden cemetery chapel, modeled on Norwegian stave churches, was built between 1908 and 1911 according to plans by the church architect Gustav Werner. The wooden interior houses Art Nouveau stained glass windows and a pipe organ built by Wilhelm Sauer. The chapel is still used for funerals and church services and it occasionally hosts musical events. In 1928, a railway built between Wannsee and Stahnsdorf, and a special train station was inaugurated on the forecourt of the cemetery for the purpose of transporting the coffins, along with the mourners, families of the deceased and visitors. The so-called cemetery railway was colloquially referred to as the widow railway. Around 33,000 graves were exhumed from the six Schöneberg parish cemeteries and transferred along with tombstones to Stahnsdorf South-Western Cemetery. The newly created cemetery was one of the first examples of the popular rural cemetery movement in Germany, along with the Ohlsdorf Cemetery of Hamburg which is non-denominational and not affiliated with any church. In the first 25 years of its operation, the Südwestfriedhof received more than 35,000 interments which is almost a third of the approximately 120,000 burials recorded to date. Although the burial area was primarily intended for the burial of the deceased of those professing the Protestant faith, with each one of the twenty-one Protestant parishes having their own plots, a separate nonsectarian part was set up by the municipal authorities for the burial of other religious communities and non-religious citizens. In addition to the non-denominational municipal blocks within the cemetery, the non-sectarian Friedenauer Waldfriedhof (Forest-cemetery of Friedenau) which has been called Wilmersdorfer Waldfriedhof Güterfelde since 1935, was opened in 1913 and then another non-denominational cemetery to the north was inaugurated in 1921 to accommodate non-sectarian burials in a secular setting. Due to the construction of Berlin Wall in 1961, the railway ceased to operate and the cemetery lost its main function as a central cemetery to serve Berlin metropolitan region, after it had been detached from its primary service area. To maintain and preserve the large cemetery under the difficult environment of a politically and geographically divided Berlin in the post-war period has always been a priority of the Evangelical Church in Berlin, Brandenburg and Silesian Upper Lusatia. Since 1991, the Protestant Church invested more than 6 million Euros for the conservation of cemetery site and associated facilities, along with the rehabilitation of the chapel, funerary monuments and mausoleums.

== List of parish burial blocks located on Stahnsdorf South-Western Cemetery ==
The burial grounds of the individual Protestant parishes are called blocks. In addition to the blocks of the parishes, there are also special blocks that were created later for war graves and reburials (see below). Many of the parishes listed here have now merged with neighboring parishes under new names.

- Old Reburial Block: Lot of Evangelical Lutheran parish of St. Matthew's Church in Berlin-Tiergarten which contains graves that were relocated to Stahnsdorf from the old parish burial ground.
- Charlottenburg Block: Non-denominational municipal section for the burial of those who reside in Charlottenburg district of Berlin, regardless of religious affiliation.
- Chapel block: A row of graves in front of the cemetery chapel, including the grave of architect Gustav Werner who built the chapel.
- Epiphany (Epiphanien) Block: Lot of Evangelical Lutheran parish of Epiphany Church in Westend.
- Redeemer (Erlöser) Block: Lot of Evangelical Lutheran parish of the Redeemer Church, reburials from the crypts of the Potsdam Garrison Church (1949) and from abandoned parts of the Old Garrison Cemetery in Berlin-Mitte.
- Gustav-Adolf Block: Lot of Protestant parish of the Gustav-Adolf Church in northern Charlottenburg.
- Holy Spirit (Heilig Geist) Block: Lot of Evangelical Lutheran parish of the Holy Spirit Church in Moabit, including Heroes' Block: War graves of fallen German soldiers from First World War.
- Lietzensee Block: Lot of Protestant parish of Witzleben church in Berlin-Witzleben.
- Nathanael Block: Lot of Protestant parish of the Nathanael Church in Schöneberg.
- Reformation Block: Lot of Evangelical Lutheran parish of the Reformation Church in Moabit.
- Schöneberg Block I and II: Non-denominational municipal section for the burial of those who reside in Schöneberg district of Berlin, regardless of religious affiliation.
- Swedish cemetery: Lot of Swedish Lutheran Victoria Community in Wilmersdorf.
- Sisters' Block: Burial site of Lutheran St. Elisabeth deaconesses.
- Stahnsdorf Block: Non-denominational municipal section for the burial of those who reside in Stahnsdorf, regardless of religious affiliation.
- Trinity (Trinitatis) Block: Lot of Evangelical Lutheran parish of the Holy Trinity Church in Charlottenburg.
- Urnhain I, II, III: Urn interment fields for those who opted for cremation.

== World War graves ==
After the First World War, the British and Italian governments acquired areas within the South-Western Cemetery in order to set up honorary cemeteries for their military personnel who perished during the First World War. The two military cemeteries, each approximately one hectare in size, have been preserved to this day. The British Commonwealth South-Western Cemetery contains a total of 1,177 burials and the Italian one around 1,650 interments. A memorial to the German soldiers who died in the First World War was erected in the South-Western Cemetery. British military graves are maintained by the Commonwealth War Graves Commission, which registered the cemetery as Berlin South-Western Cemetery. Queen Elizabeth II of the United Kingdom paid a visit to South-Western Cemetery on November 3, 2004 to commemorate those who died in the First World War at the British military cemetery on the occasion of her state visit to Germany.

== Flora and fauna ==
Apart from its architectural and historic importance, the cemetery ground serves as a home to many animal species, which includes over 40 species of birds, 200 species of butterflies and over 300 species of insects, with some of those endangered that are threatened by extinction. Four different bat species live in the crypts and mausoleums. There are also over 200,000 trees on the site, along with different species of shrubs, bushes and flowers.

== In popular culture ==
The gothic setting of the burial ground and grave monuments in the attractive forest-like landscape has made the Stahnsdorf South-Western Cemetery a backdrop for film shoots on various occasions, particularly the area around the chapel and the mausoleum of the Caspary family.

- In March 2009, Roman Polanski filmed a scene for The Ghostwriter, starring Ewan McGregor and Tom Wilkinson, in a remote area of the Lietzensee block in the cemetery.
- Julian Rosefeldt shot the eulogy scene of his movie Manifesto at the South-Western Cemetery with Cate Blanchett starring as the funeral speaker.
- The cemetery chapel was also used as a filming location in Dark; a German science fiction thriller television series released on Netflix in 2017.

== Notable burials, including re-burials from Berlin parish burial grounds ==
List is sorted in order of the year of death.

- Adolf Bernhard Marx (1795–1866), music theorist, critic, and musicologist
- Richard Lucae (1829–1877), architect
- August Krönig (1822–1879), chemist and physicist
- Gustav Reichardt (1797–1884), music teacher and composer
- Johann Georg Meyer (1813–1886), commonly known as Meyer von Bremen, painter
- Jean Lulvès (1833–1889), Franco-German painter
- Alexander von Monts (1832-1889), officer in the Prussian Navy and later the German Imperial Navy
- Werner von Siemens (1816–1892), electrical engineer, inventor and industrialist
- Gustav Langenscheidt (1832–1895), book publisher, and the founder of Langenscheidt Publishing Group
- Fedor Jagor (1816–1900), ethnologist, naturalist and explorer
- Hedwig Raabe (1844–1905), actress
- Adolf Bastian (1826–1905), polymath
- Ferdinand von Richthofen (1833–1905), traveller, geographer, and scientist
- Wilhelm von Bezold (1837-1907), physicist and meteorologist
- Bernhard Plockhorst (1825– 1907), painter and graphic artist
- Eberhard Schrader (1836–1908), orientalist
- August Meitzen (1822-1910), statistician
- Carl Anton Ewald (1845–1915), gastroenterologist
- August Stramm (1874–1915), war poet and playwright
- Georg Jochmann (1874–1915), internist and bacteriologist
- Eduard Sonnenburg (1848–1915), surgeon
- Christian Luerssen (1843–1916), botanist
- Dorrit Weixler (1892–1916), actress
- Albert Eulenburg (1840–1917), neurologist
- Albert Niemann (tenor) (1831-1917), operatic heldentenor especially associated with the operas of Richard Wagner
- Adelsteen Normann (1848–1918), Norwegian painter
- Johannes Kaempf (1842–1918), liberal politician and banker
- Reinhold Felderhoff (1865–1919), sculptor
- Gilda Langer (1896–1920), stage and film actress
- Engelbert Humperdinck (composer) (1854–1921), composer
- Hugo Conwentz (1855–1922), botanist
- Carl Ludwig Schleich (1859–1922), surgeon and writer
- Carl Harries (1866–1923), chemist
- Emanuel Reicher (1849–1924), actor
- Lovis Corinth (1858–1925), artist and writer
- Karl Hilgers (1844–1925), sculptor
- Wilhelm Kuhnert (1865–1926), painter, author and illustrator
- Karl Holl (1866–1926), professor of Lutheran theology and church history at Tübingen
- Richard Eilenberg (1848–1927), composer
- Erich Kaiser-Titz (1875–1928), stage and film actor
- Heinrich Zille (1858–1929), illustrator, caricaturist, lithographer and photographer
- Meta Seinemeyer (1895–1929), opera singer
- Otto Taubmann (1859–1929), composer and conductor
- Hans Moldenhauer (1901–1929), Germany's first major international tennis player
- Oskar Kanehl (1888–1929), poet
- Emil Krebs (1867–1930), polyglot and sinologist
- F. W. Murnau (1888–1931), film director, producer, and screenwriter
- Theodor Wedepohl (1863–1931), portrait, landscape and genre painter
- Hans Wassmann (1873–1932), actor
- Ernst Kromayer (1862–1933), dermatologist
- Max Adalbert (1874–1933), stage and film actor
- Lola Artôt de Padilla (1880-1933), French-Spanish soprano
- Franz Bracht (1877–1933), jurist and politician
- Oskar Fleischer (1856–1933), musicologist
- Willem Kes (1856–1934), Dutch conductor, composer, violist, and violinist
- Alexander von Kluck (1846–1934), general during World War I
- Wilhelm Diegelmann (1861–1934), actor
- Hugo Rüdel (1868–1934), choir director and conductor
- Max Friedlaender (musicologist) (1852–1934), bass singer, music editor, and musicologist
- Siegfried Seidel-Dittmarsch (1887–1934), Nazi Party politician and SS-Gruppenführer
- Karl Ludwig Manzel (1858–1936), sculptor and painter
- Friedrich von Oppeln-Bronikowski (1873–1936), writer, translator, publisher and cultural historian
- Rudolf Bosselt (1871–1938), sculptor
- Erna Denera (1881–1938), operatic soprano and voice teacher
- Ernst Gennat (1880–1939), director of the Berlin criminal police
- Wilhelm Groener (1867–1939), general and politician
- Magnus von Levetzow (1871–1939), naval officer who rose to the rank of Konteradmiral
- Willy Hess (violinist) (1859–1939), violinist and violin teacher
- Georg von Arco (1869–1940), physicist, radio pioneer, and one of the joint founders of the "Society for Wireless Telegraphy" which became the Telefunken company
- August Borchard (1864–1940), physician and surgeon
- Ralph Arthur Roberts (1884–1940), actor
- Wilhelm Guttmann (1886–1941), composer
- Friedrich Mallinckrodt (1894–1941), World War I test pilot and flying ace credited with six aerial victories
- Carl Friedrich von Siemens (1872–1941), entrepreneur and politician, a member of the Siemens family
- Joachim Gottschalk (1904–1941), stage and film actor
- Adolf Gottstein (1857–1941), social hygienist and epidemiologist
- Hugo Distler (1908–1942), organist, choral conductor and composer
- Emmy Wyda (1876–1942), actress
- Rudolf Breitscheid (1874–1944), politician
- Max de Crinis (1889–1945), psychiatrist
- Friedrich Paschen (1865-1947), physicist
- Kurt Feldt (1897–1970), general in the Wehrmacht
- Jean Kurt Forest (1909–1975), violist, Kapellmeister and composer
- Hannjo Hasse (1921–1983), actor
- Otto Graf Lambsdorff (1926–2009), politician
- Maja Maranow (1961–2016), actress
- Manfred Krug (1937–2016), actor, singer and author
- Dieter Thomas Heck (1937–2018), television presenter, singer and actor
- Jürgen Holtz (1932–2020), actor
- Thomas Gumpert (1952–2021), actor

== Gallery ==
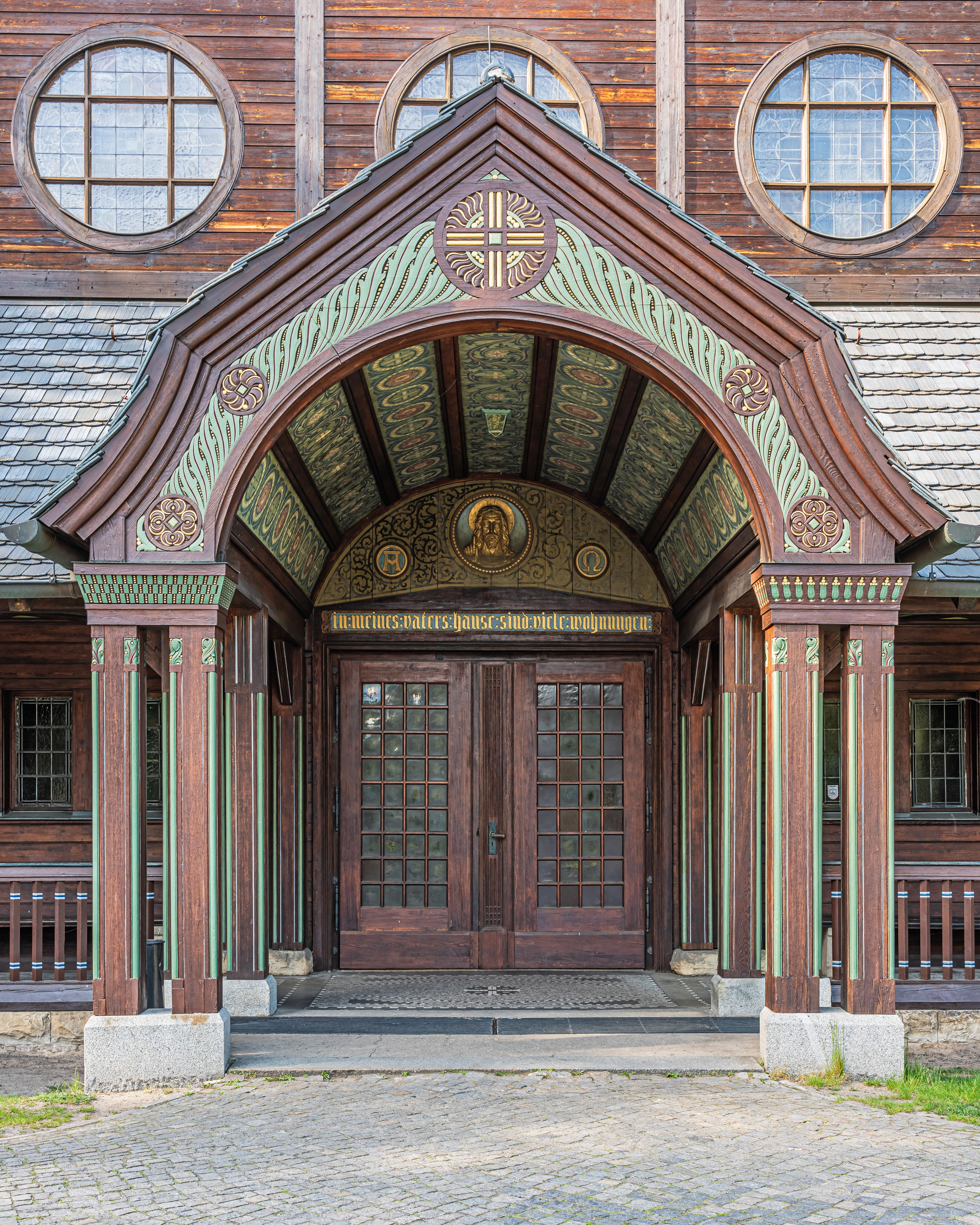
The entrance of the cemetery chapel

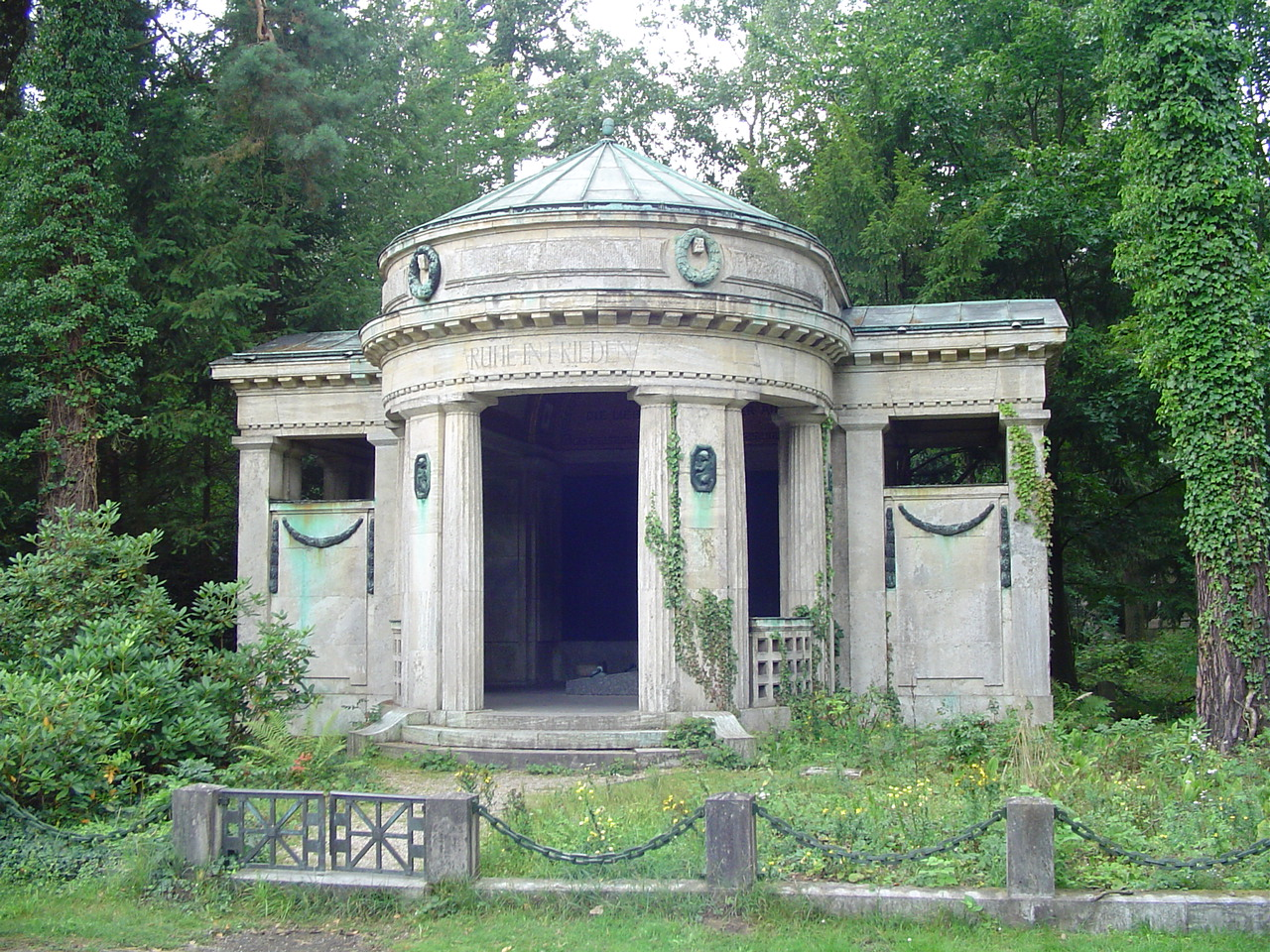
Mausoleum of the Caspary family built in 1911–1912

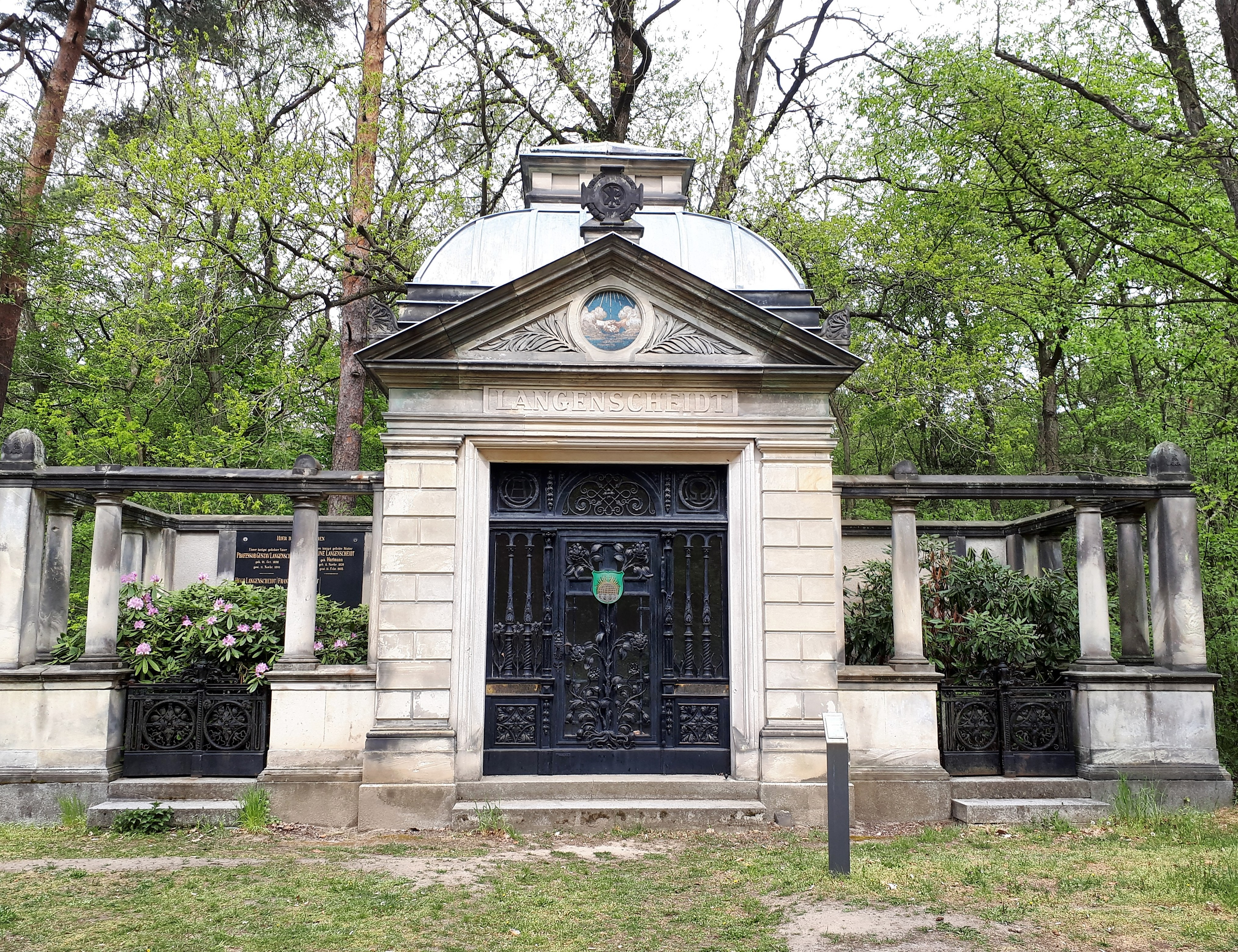
Langenscheidt mausoleum

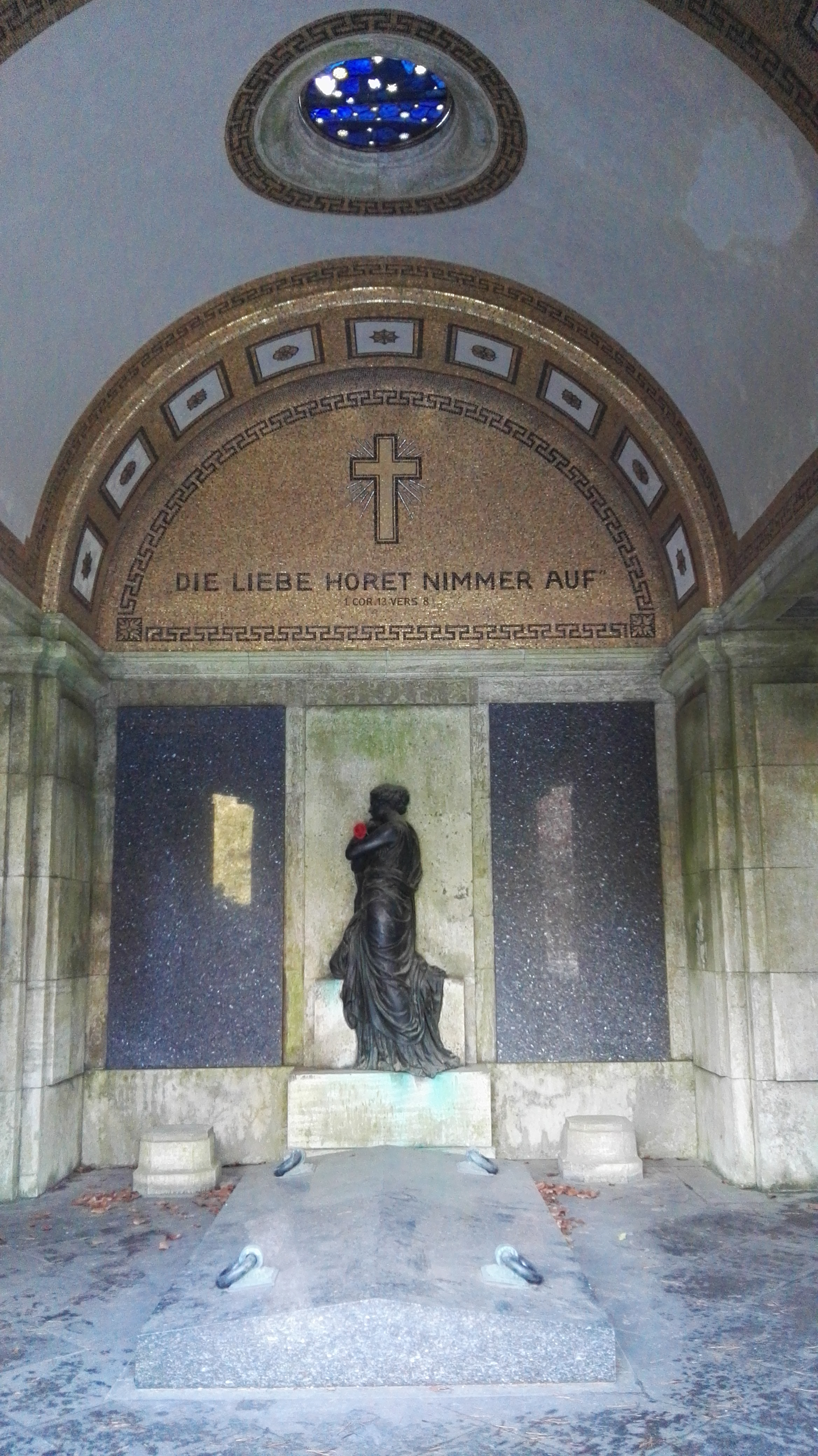
Interior of a family vault

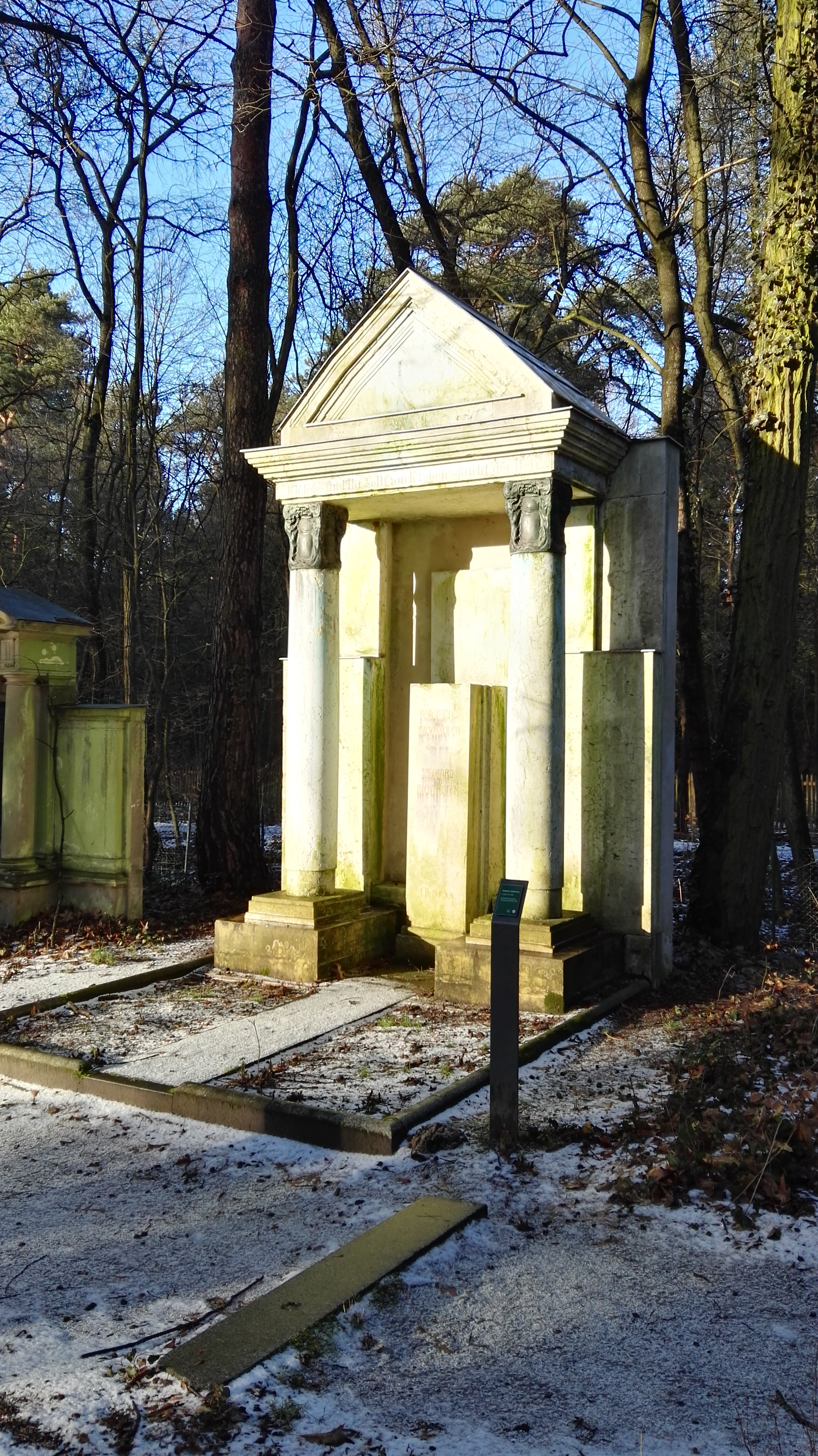
Mausoleum of Ferdinand von Richthofen

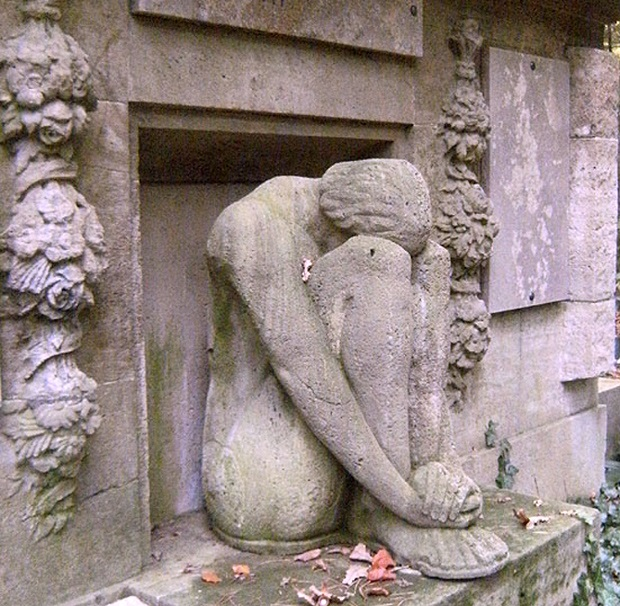
Grave figure by sculptor Kurt Kroner

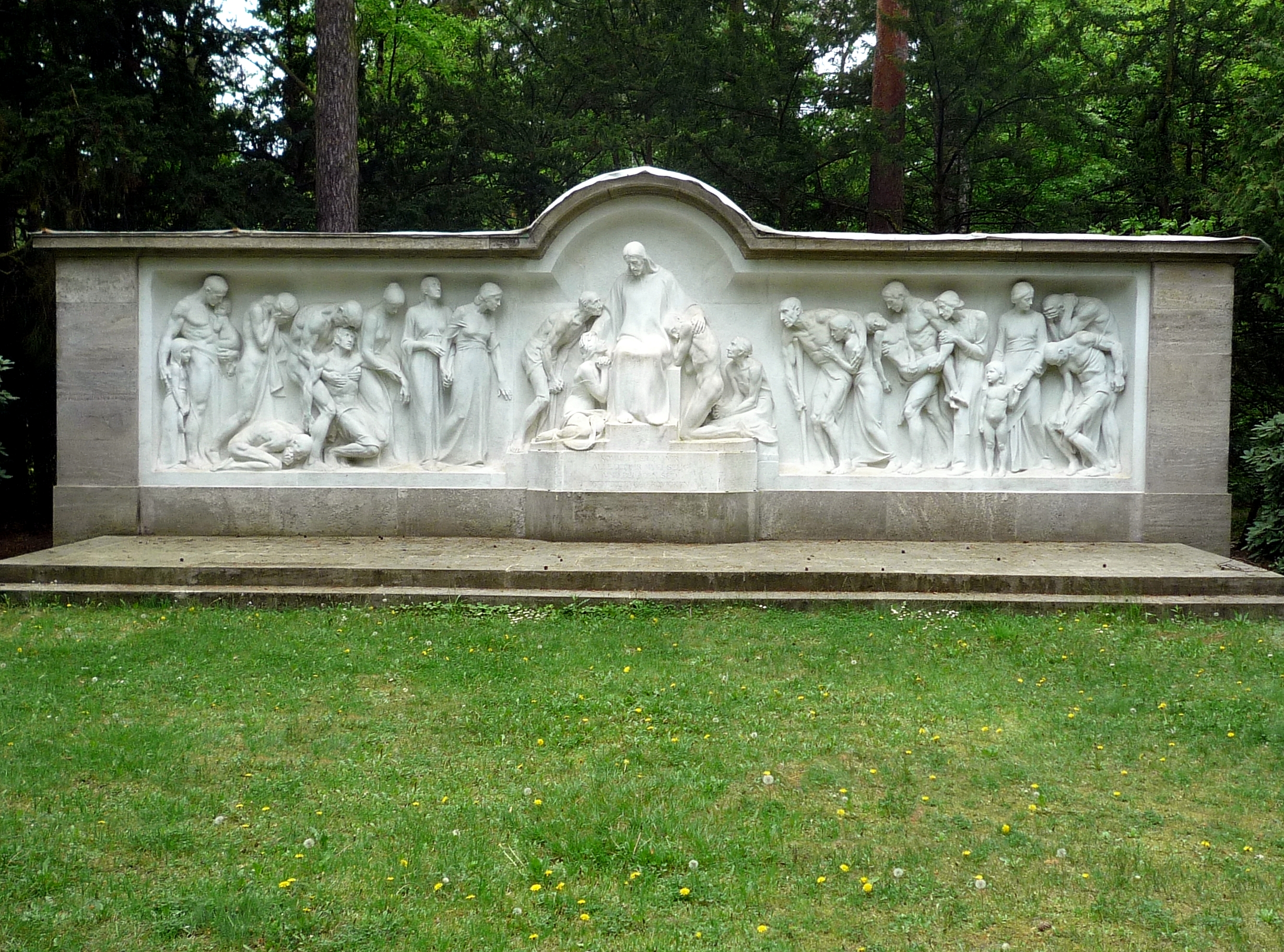
Christ-Monument by sculptor Ludwig Manzel

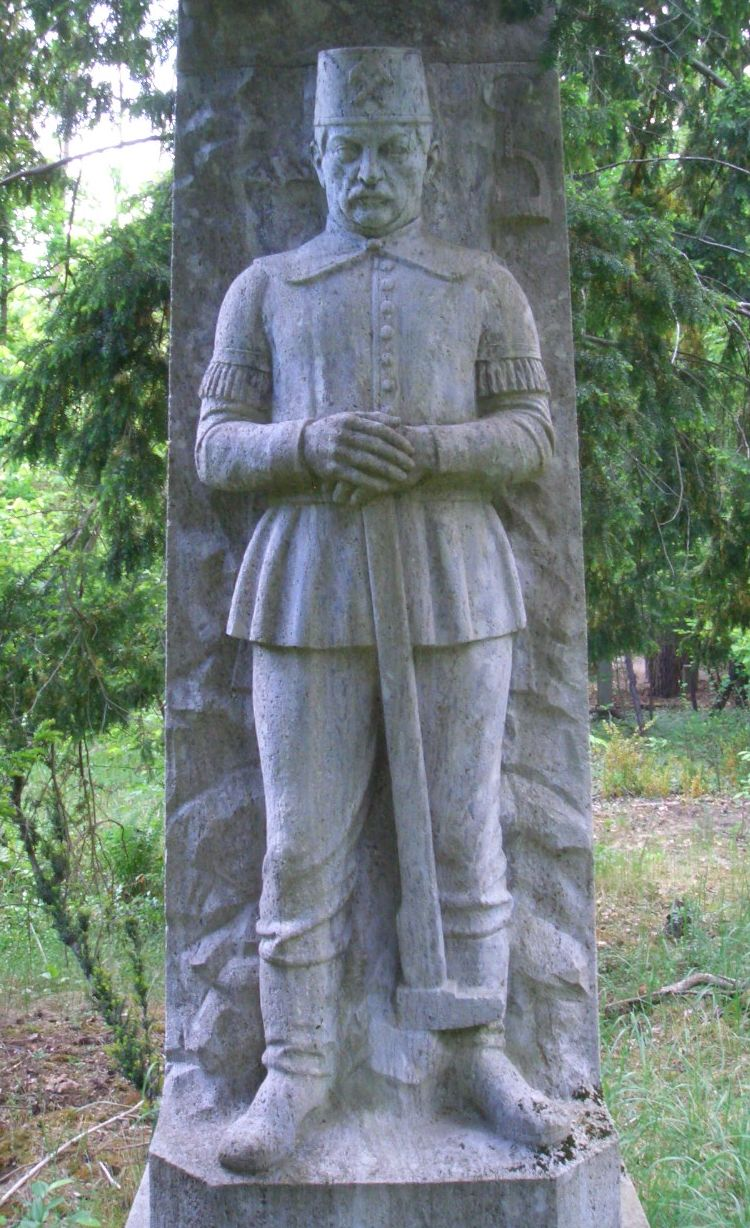
Life-size statue for the Oskar Poensgen family grave by sculptor August Kraus

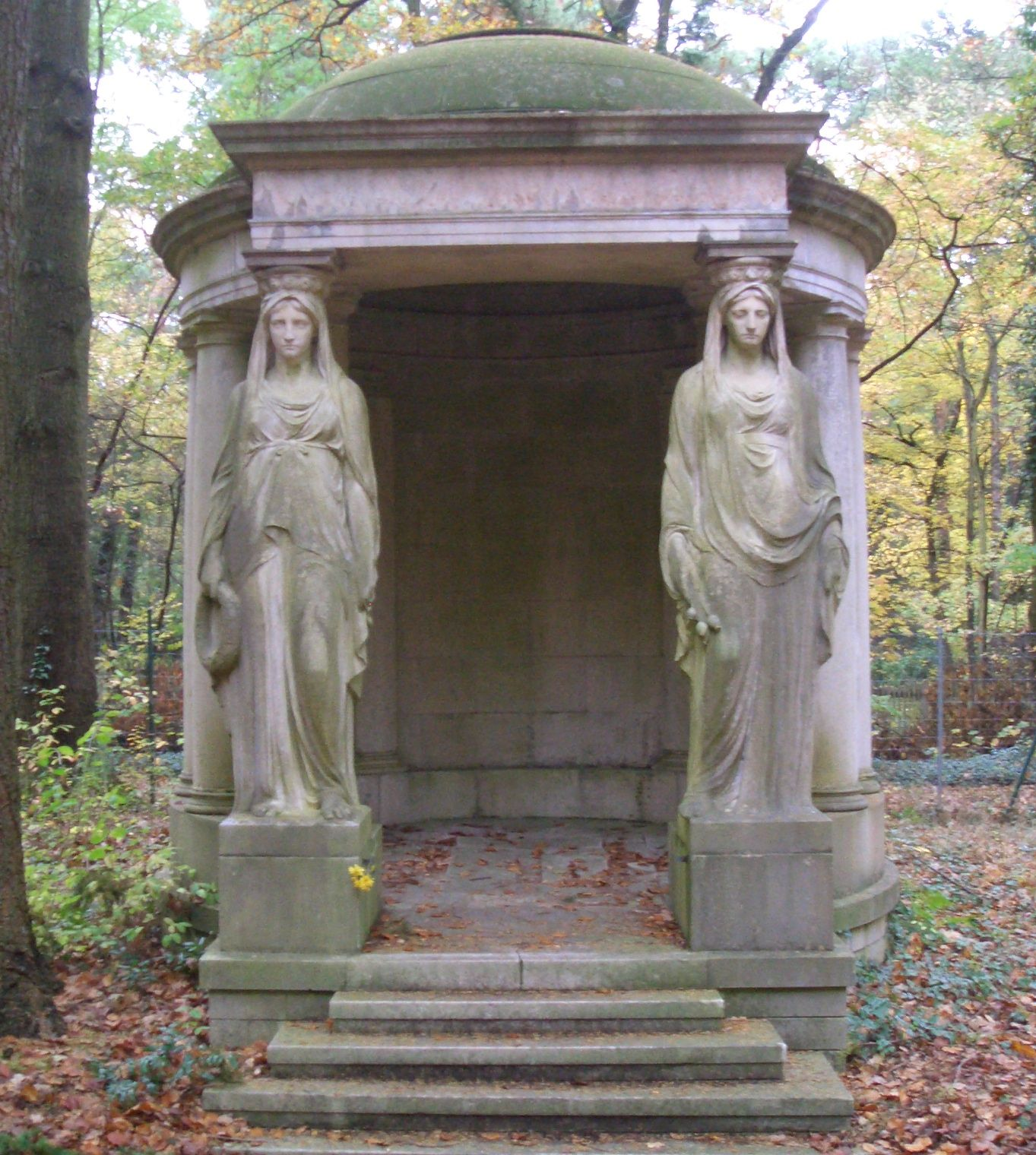
Monument for the banker Wilhelm Kühn by sculptor Reinhold Felderhoff

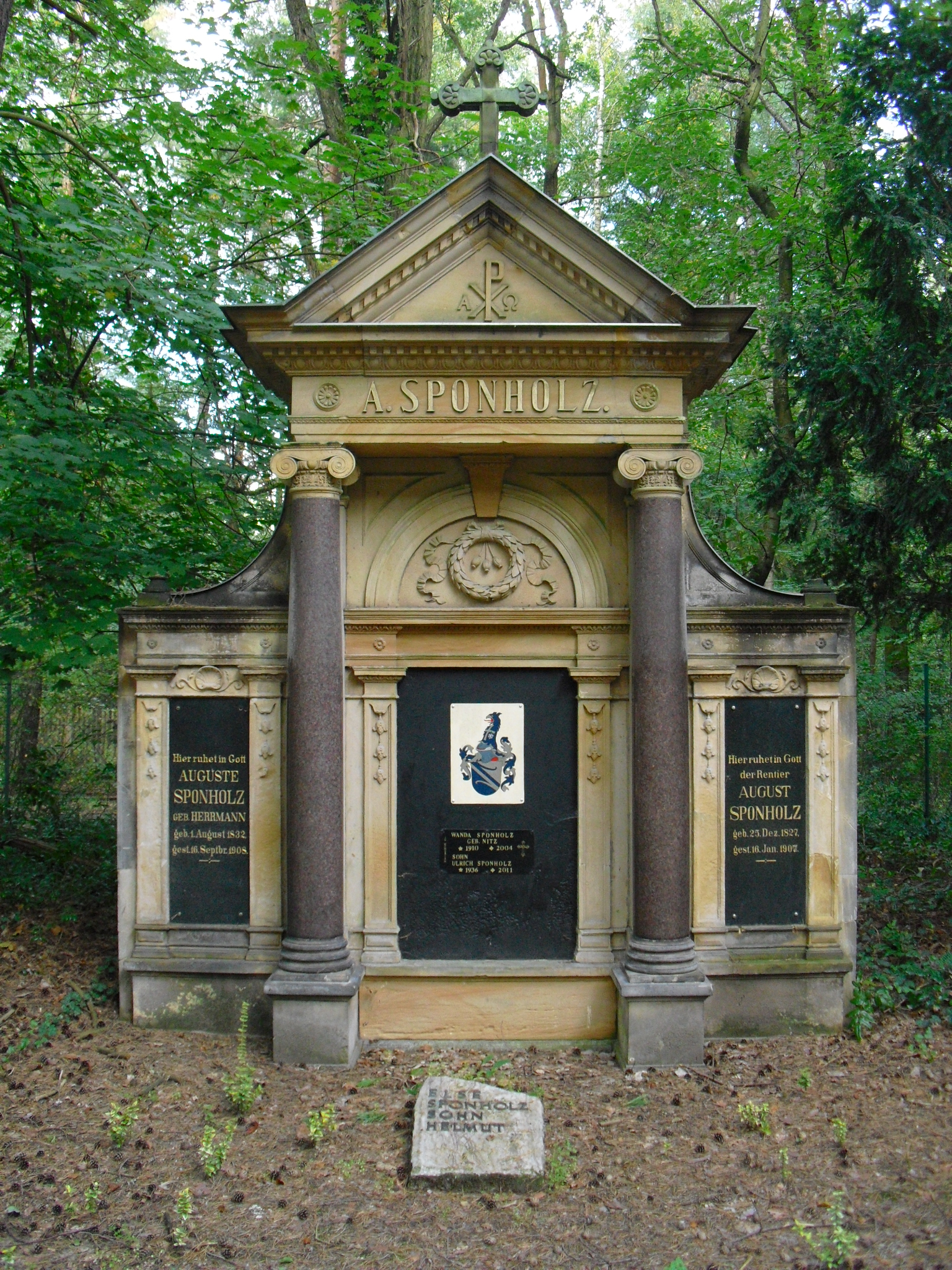
Grave monument for August Sponholz

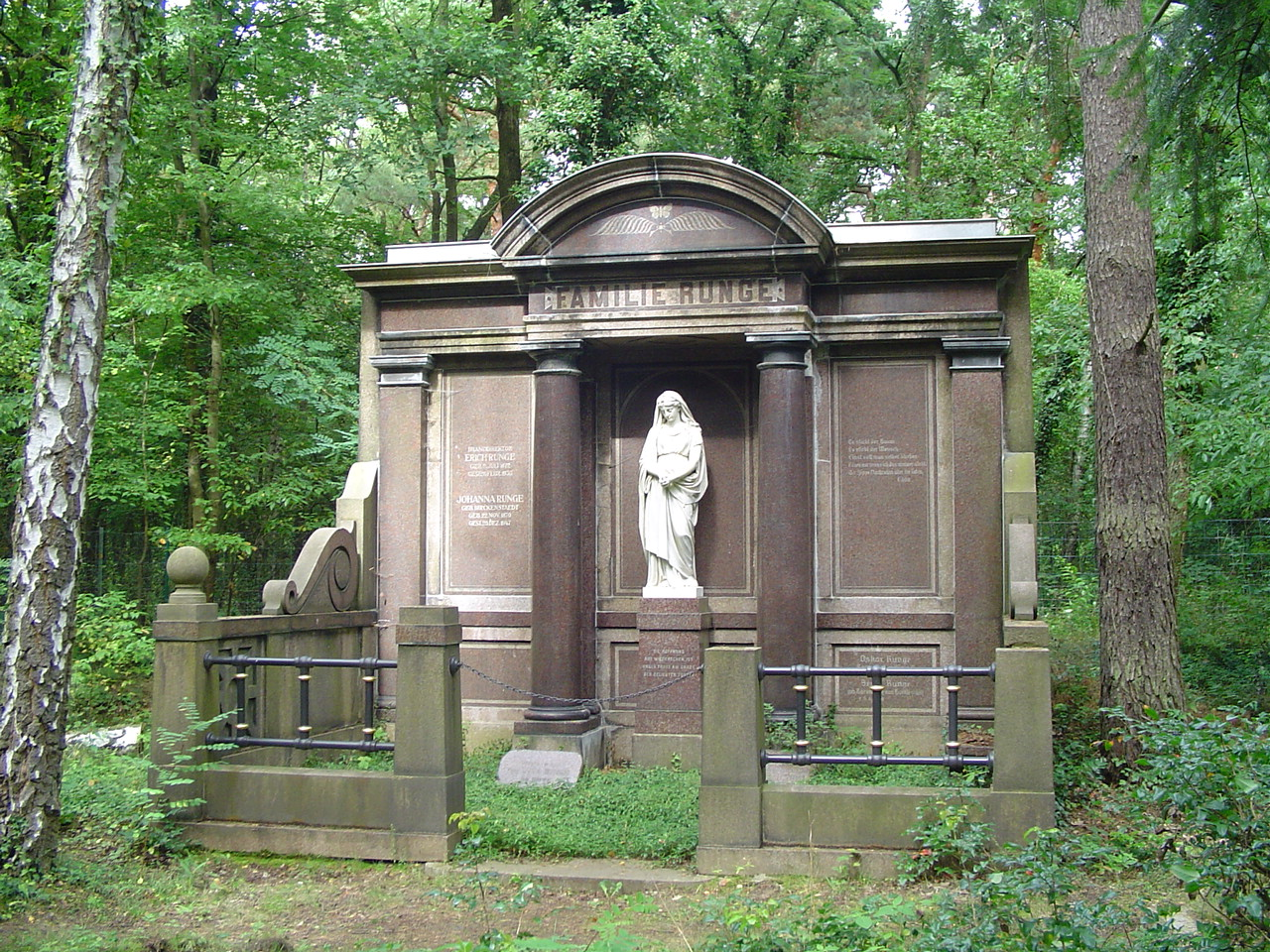
Mourning female figure by sculptor Heinrich Pohlmann

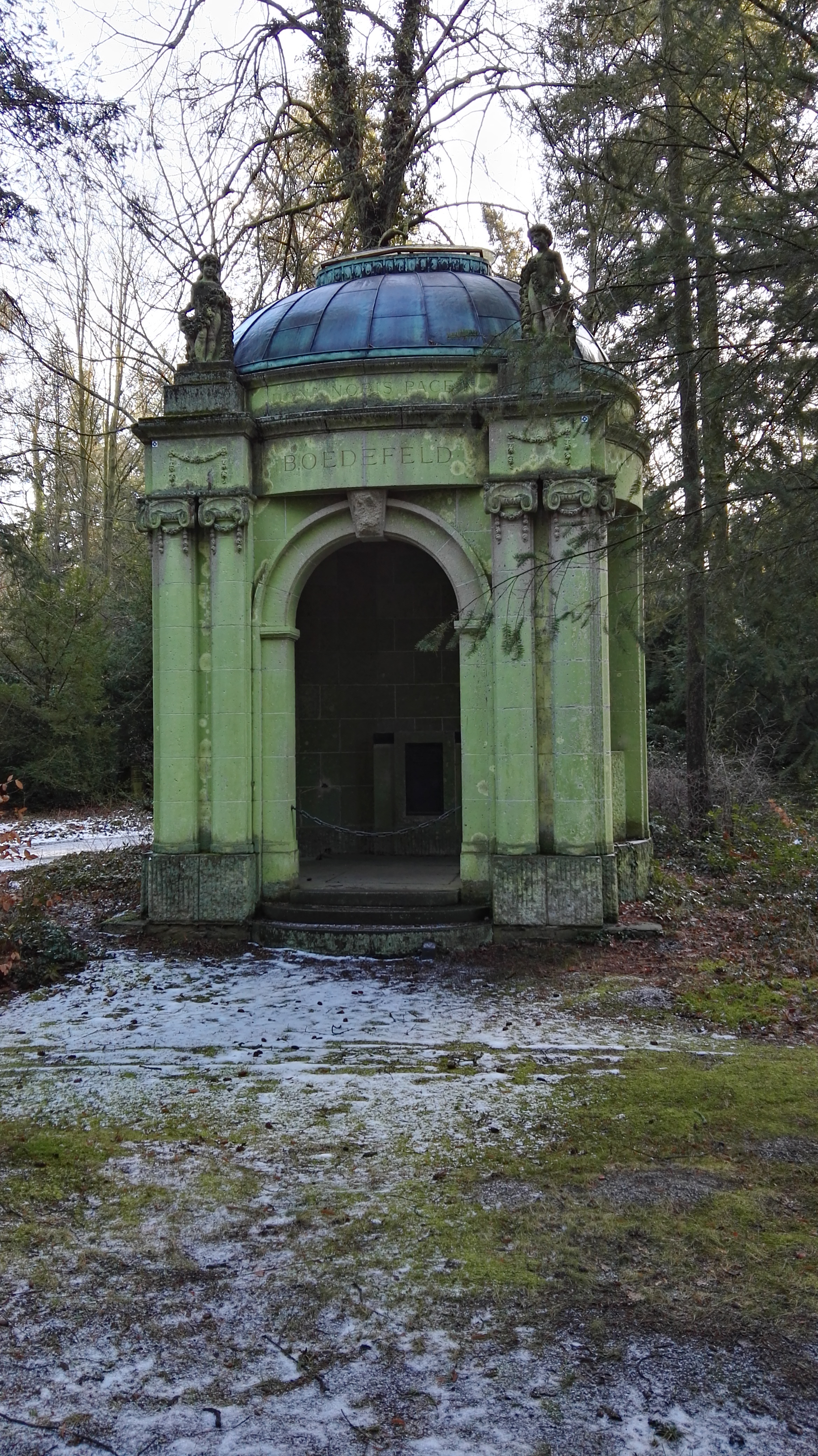
Boedefeld family mausoleum
