= Juon =

Juon may refer to:

- Paul Juon, noted classical composer
- Ju-On, a series of horror films originating in Japan; remade in English as The Grudge by the same director
