= Duden-Bibliothek =

Duden-Bibliothek (English: The Duden Library), known as the Office-Blibliothek until August 2010 and the PC-Bibliothek until version 3, is a proprietary digital library on which many electronic reference works of the Bibliographisches Institut & F. A. Brockhaus (Brockhaus, Duden, Meyer) ("BIFAB") and the Langenscheid publisher are based. In addition, the Office-Blibliothek (or its compatible predecessor version, see below) is also used for the Lexikon der Religionspädagogik published by Neukirchener Verlag and for the Römpp Chemie-Lexikon published by the Thieme publishing group. Reed Publishing in New Zealand also uses the Duden-Bibliothek.

While the software itself can be downloaded free of charge, the reference works that can be used with it must be purchased.

Since September 2010, the software, which has been updated to version 5.1, has been available for download as a Duden library and is also supplied on CD-ROMs with Duden books. The current version 6 cannot integrate all previous reference works, as the underlying file format has changed. On the "Service packs and patches" page, only version 6.4 from October 2020 is currently (February 2024) offered.
