= Gustav Langenscheidt =

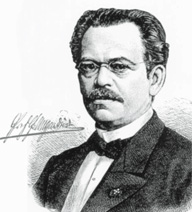
- Born: October 21, 1832; Berlin, Prussia
- Died: November 11, 1895 (aged 63); Berlin, Prussia
- Resting place: Stahnsdorf South-Western Cemetery, Germany
- Known for: Founder of Langenscheidt Publishing Group
- Notable work: Encyklopädisches französisch-deutsches und deutsch-französisches Wörterbuch ("Encyclopedic French-German and German-French dictionary"); Encyklopädisches englisch-deutsches und deutsch-englisches Wörterbuch ("Encyclopedic English-German and German-English dictionary")
- Spouse: Pauline Hartmann (m. 1857–1895) (his death)
- Children: 2 daughters, 4 sons

Gustav Langenscheidt (October 21, 1832 – November 11, 1895) was a German language teacher, book publisher, and the founder of Langenscheidt Publishing Group.

== Life ==
Gustav Langenscheidt was the son of Johann Ludwig Langenscheidt, a decorator, and his wife Sophie Caroline Schwartze. After graduating from high school in 1850 Langenscheidt started a commercial apprenticeship, which he completed in two years.

Between 1851 and the spring of 1853 Langenscheidt traveled to almost all the neighboring countries of Germany and covered around 7000 kilometers on foot and by stagecoach. After returning to Germany he joined the army in the summer of 1853. During his time in the military Langenscheidt extensively studied the different ways of learning the French language.

In 1857, he married Pauline Hartmann (1832–1903) in Berlin and had two daughters and four sons, including the writer and publisher Paul Langenscheidt and Carl Langenscheidt, who later became his successor.

Gustav Langenscheidt died on November 11, 1895, at the age of 63 years. He was first buried in the Alter St.-Matthäus-Kirchhof in Schöneberg, but then his remains were transferred to a newly built family mausoleum in Stahnsdorf South-Western Cemetery in 1935. The family's mausoleum is in Department D of the cemetery.

== Work ==
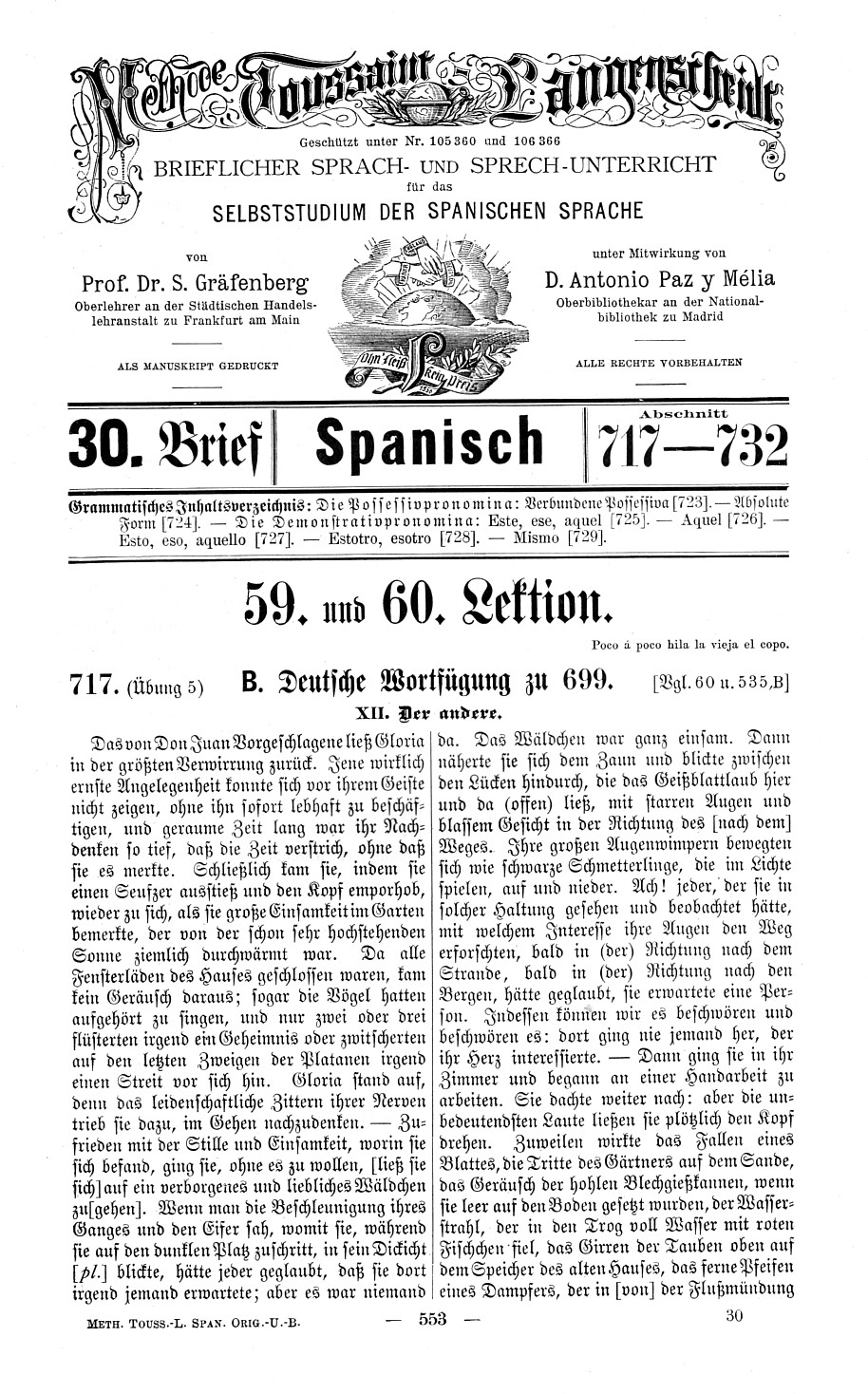
Example title page of a language learning letter for Spanish, which uses the Toussaint–Langenscheidt method

Together with Charles Toussaint Langenscheidt developed a self-learning method, which he published in 1856 under the title Unterrichtsbriefe zur Erlernung der französischen Sprache ("Teaching letters for learning the French language"). Langenscheidt had copied the idea of such a teaching method and especially the sales strategy of William Cobbett. Since no publisher was interested in this teaching work, Langenscheidt himself established a publishing house on October 1, 1856. These correspondence lessons became very popular and were widely read, so today Langenscheidt can be considered the "father of distance education".

In 1857 Langenscheidt was appointed chief writer of the 11th Infantry Brigade in Berlin. In 1861, together with Carl Dalen and Henry Lloyd, Langenscheidt published "English lessons letters" (similar in structure to the French). From 1867 Langenscheidt Publishing Group had its printing press.

From 1869 Langenscheidt worked with Karl Sachs and Césaire Villatte on the Encyklopädisches französisch-deutsches und deutsch-französisches Wörterbuch ("Encyclopedic French–German and German–French dictionary") and was finally able to publish it in 1880. In 1874, Langenscheidt was awarded the title of professor.

In 1891, in close collaboration with Eduard Muret and Daniel Sanders, he started working on the English equivalent, the Encyklopädisches englisch-deutsches und deutsch-englisches Wörterbuch ("Encyclopedic English–German and German–English dictionary"). Langenscheidt did not live to see its publication; his son Carl, his successor, published it in 1901.

The Toussaint–Langenscheidt method is based on the language teaching methodology of James Hamilton and Jean Joseph Jacotot. The revolutionary aspect of this method was that the focus was no longer on grammar, but on reading and communication. Langenscheidt and Toussaint created a new phonetic alphabet for the representation of pronunciation in order to facilitate learning. This was used until the Second World War, after which it was replaced by the International Phonetic Alphabet (IPA).

== Honors ==
- The Langenscheidt bridge in Berlin is named after Gustav Langenscheidt.
- The Gustav Langenscheidt School in Berlin is named after him.
