= Der Große Muret Sanders =

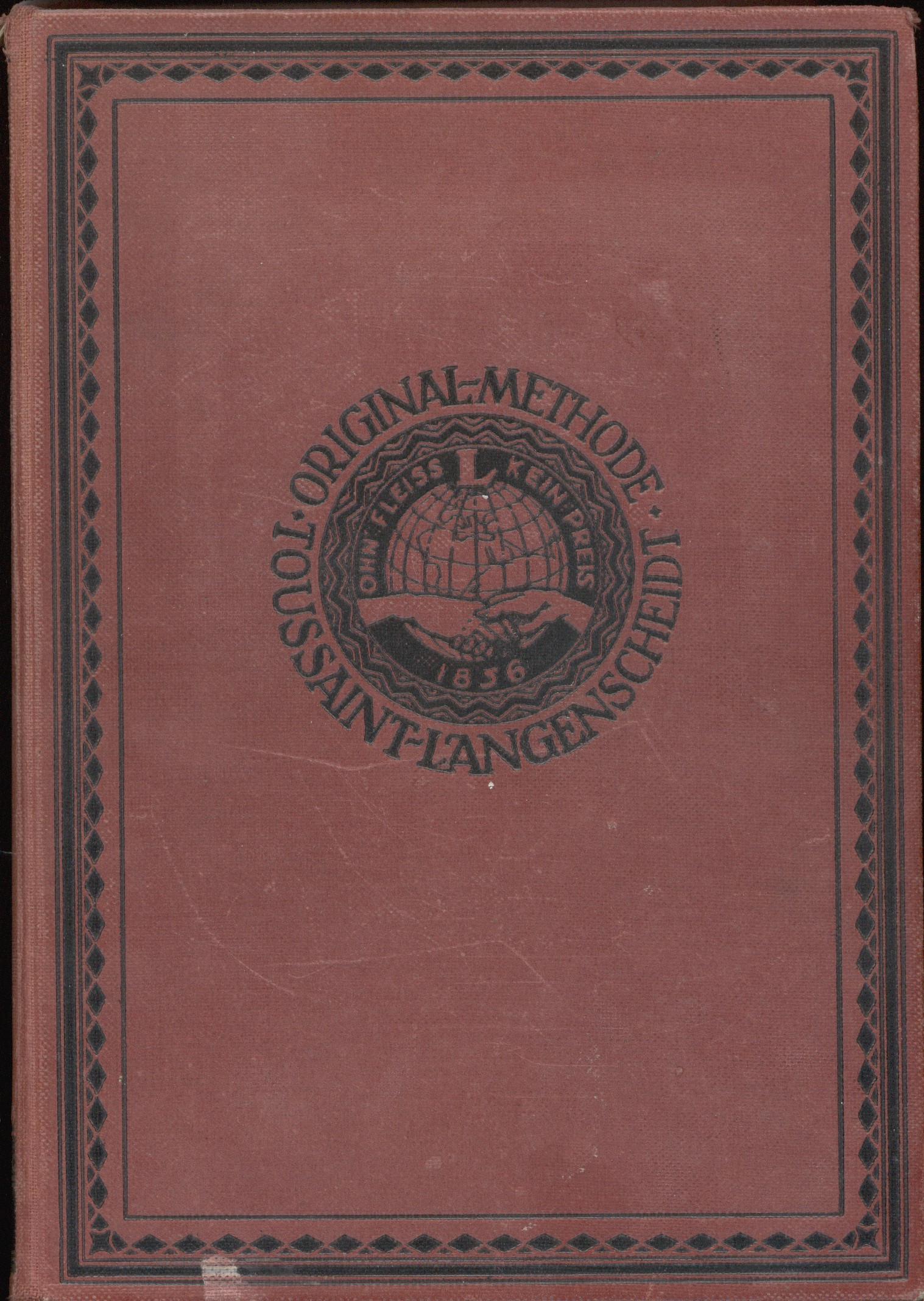
Edition from 1910

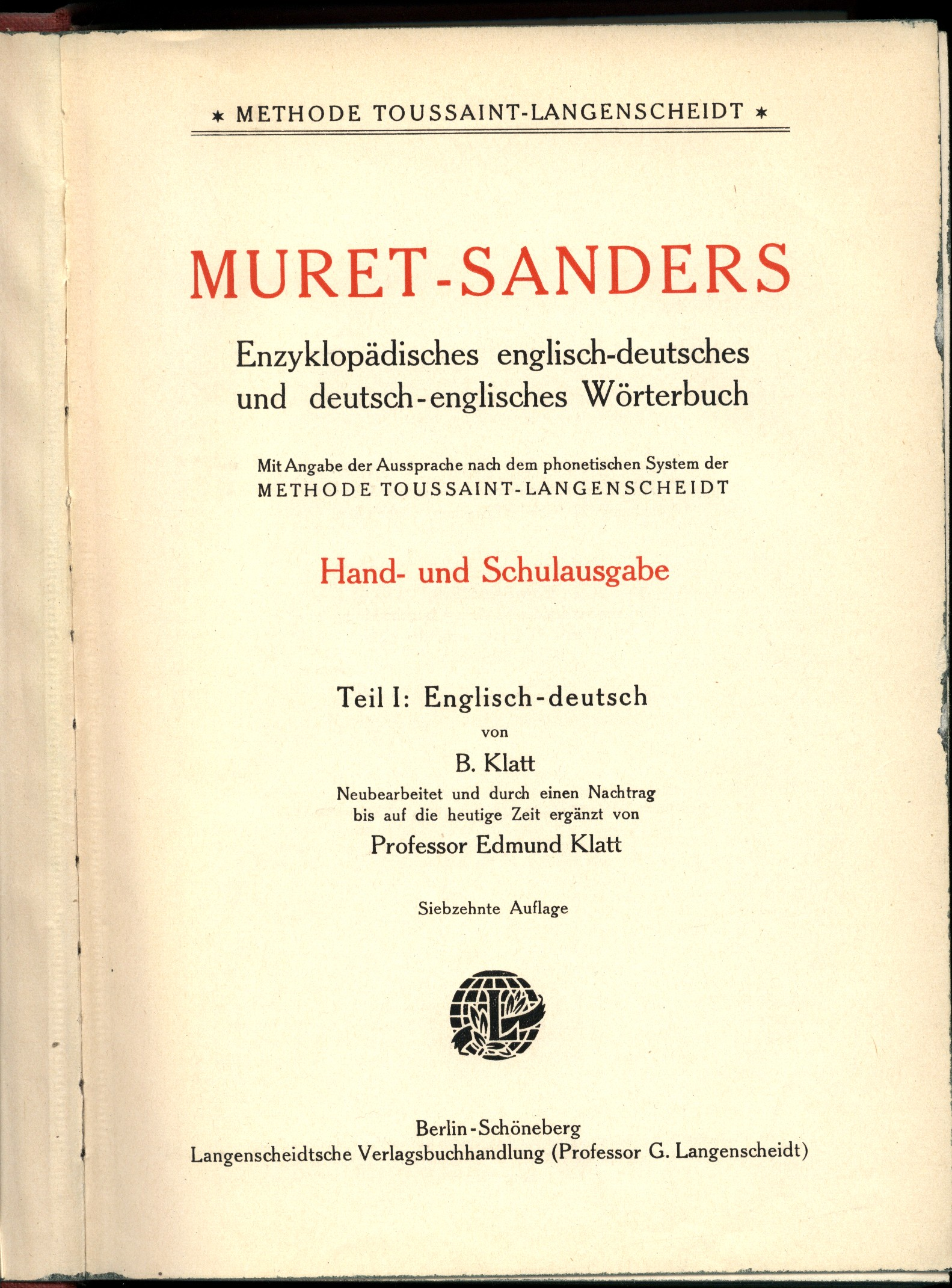
German dustjacket

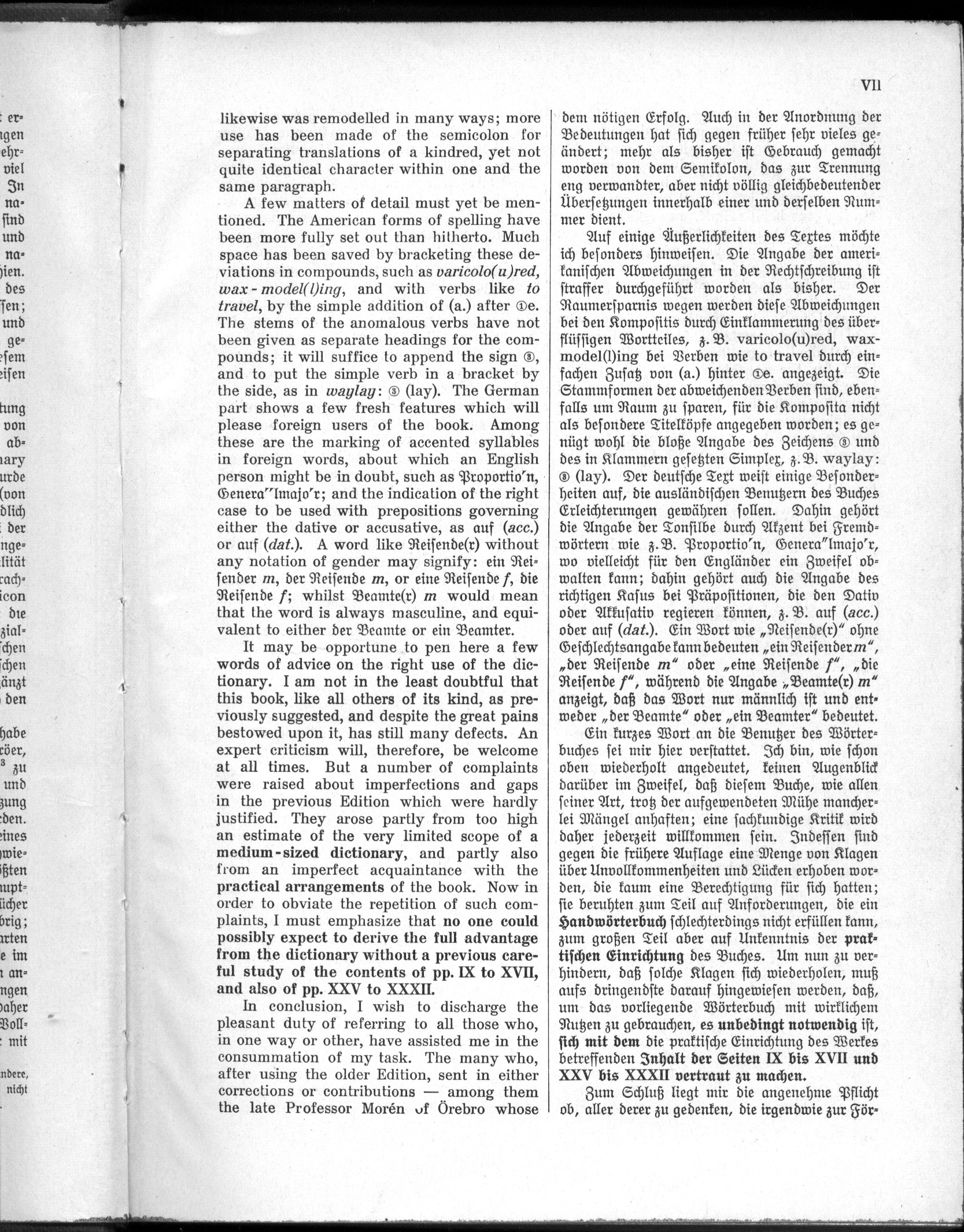
Dictionary Muret-Sanders, Edition 1910

Der Große Muret-Sanders is a German–English and English–German bilingual dictionary now published by German publishing house Langenscheidt. In its original form, it was a (monodirectional) German–English dictionary in two volumes by Eduard Muret and Daniel Sanders, published in 1869. The most recent edition contains 560,000 entries in 4 volumes and is the largest German–English bilingual dictionary available; a CD-ROM edition is also available from Langenscheidt as Muret-Sanders e-Großwörterbuch Deutsch–Englisch.
