= Richard Eilenberg =

German composer

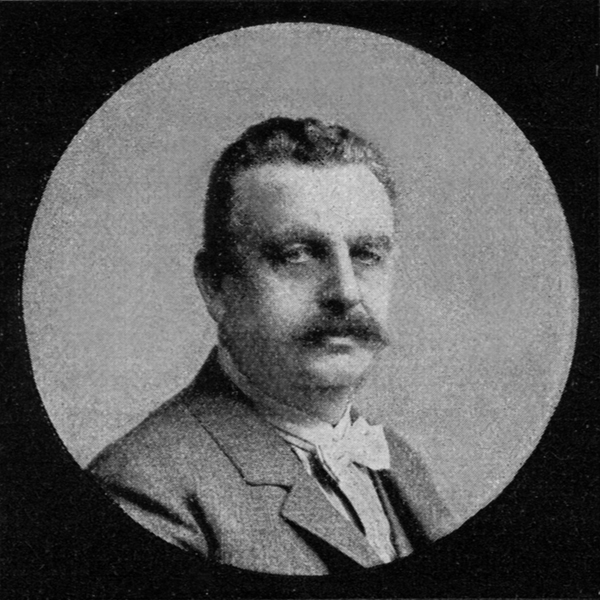
Richard Eilenberg

Richard Eilenberg (13 January 1848 – 5 December 1927) was a German composer.

== Life ==
Born in Merseburg, Eilenberg's musical career began with the study of piano and composition. At 18 years old, he composed his first work, a concert overture. As a volunteer he participated in the Franco-Prussian War from 1870 to 1871. In 1873, Eilenberg became the music director and conductor in Stettin. In 1889, he decided to move to Berlin as a freelance composer, where his second marriage with his wife Dorothee started. They lived on 73 Bremer Street.

Eilenberg composed marches and dances for orchestra, harmony and military music, and a ballet The Rose of Shiras, Op. 134. He also composed the operettas Comtess Cliquot (1909), King Midas, Marietta, and The Great Prince. The most notable music that he composed were his marches, including The Coronation March (for Alexander III of Russia), and Janitscharen-Marsch, Op. 295.

Some of his music pieces, attributable to the salon and its entertainment, were The Petersburg Sleigh Ride, Op. 52 and The Mill In The Black Forest, Op. 57 (1885). Eilenberg completed 350 compositions throughout his life, including ten fantasies after melodies of great masters, like Ehrenkränze der Tonkunst, Opp. 268–277 and the suite Durch Feld und Wald, Op. 119.

He died in Berlin. His grave is located at the Stahnsdorf South-Western Cemetery in Potsdam.

== Media ==
- Petersburg Sleigh Ride
