= Karl Holl =

German theologian and church historian (1866–1926)

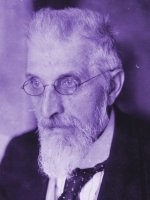
- Born: 15 May 1866; Tübingen, Germany
- Died: 23 May 1926 (aged 60); Berlin

Academic background
- Education: University of Tübingen; University of Berlin

Academic work
- School or tradition: Tübingen School
- Institutions: University of Tübingen; University of Berlin
- Main interests: Theology; Church History

Karl Holl (15 May 1866 – 23 May 1926) was a professor of theology and church history at Tübingen and Berlin and is considered one of the most influential church historians of his era.

== Life ==
Karl Holl studied philosophy and theology at the Tübinger Stift. He became a member of the Studentenverbindung (student association) Normannia. While serving as a minister in Württemberg, he completed his doctorate and became the lead tutor (Repetent) at the Tübinger Stift in 1891. From 1894 he was active as a research assistant at the Prussian Academy of Sciences at the instigation of Adolf von Harnack. He completed his Habilitation in 1896 at the theological faculty of Berlin. In 1901 he became associate professor (Extraordinarius) of church history at the University of Tübingen, from 1906 he was Professor (Ordinarius) at the University of Berlin. On December 17, 1914, he was admitted as a full member of the Prussian Academy of Sciences. He also served from 1912 to 1926 as “Ephorus” of the Evangelical Theological Seminary, the Stiftung Johanneum, in Berlin. His grave is located at the Stahnsdorf South-Western Cemetery near Berlin.

== Work ==
Karl Holl's theological development is characterized by the outlook of the “Tubingen school” of Ferdinand Christian Baur. He published numerous studies on Martin Luther, which made a fundamental contribution to scholarship and remain important today. Holl's works interpret the Lutheran religious and God concept as “Gewissensreligion” (a religion of conscience) and helped spark the “Luther Renaissance.” He returned the doctrine of justification to its place in the center of theology.

He has been called "perhaps the greatest Luther scholar of [his] generation".

== Original works ==
- Die Sacra Parallela des Johannes Damascenus, 1897
- Enthusiasmus und Bußgewalt beim griechischen Mönchtum, und Studium zu Symeon der Neuen Theologen, 1898
- Fragmente vornicänischer Kirchenväter aus den Sacra Parallela, 1899
- Amphilochius von Ikonium in seinem Verhältnis zu den großen Kappadoziern, 1904
- Die geist. Übungen des Ignatius von Loyola. Eine psychologische Studie, 1905
- Die Rechtfertigungslehre im Licht der Geschichte des Protestantismus, 1906
- Was hat die Rechtfertigungslehre dem modernen Menschen zu sagen?, 1907
- Der Modernismus, 1908
- Johannes Calvin, Rede zur Feier der 400. Wiederkehr des Geburtstages Calvins, 1909
- Die handschriftliche Überlieferung des Epiphanius, 1910
- Thomas Chalmers und die Anfänge der kirchlich-sozialen Bewegung, 1913
- Der Kirchenbegriff des Paulus in seinem Verhältnis zu dem der Urgemeinde, 1921
- Gesammelte Aufsätze zur Kirchengeschichte I.: Luther (1. Was verstand Luther unter Religion? 2. Rechtfertigungslehre in Luthers Vorlesung über den Römerbrief mit besonderer Rücksicht auf die Frage der Heilsgewißheit. 3. Der Neubau der Sittlichkeit. 4. Die Entstehung von Luthers Kirchenbegriff. 5. Luther und das landesherrliche Kirchenregiment. 6. Luthers Urteile über sich selbst. 7. Luther und die Schwärmer. 8. Die Kulturbedeutung der Reformation 9. Luthers Bedeutung für den Fortschritt der Auslegungskunst), 1921
- Augustins innere Entwicklung, 1923
- Urchristentum und Religionsgeschichte, 1924
- Die Entstehung der vier Fastenzeiten in der griechischen Kirche, 1924
- Christliche Reden, 1926
- Gesammelte Aufsätze zur Kirchengeschichte II.: Der Osten, 1927/28
- Gesammelte Aufsätze zur Kirchengeschichte III.: Der Westen, 1928

== English translations ==
- The cultural significance of the Reformation. New York: Meridian Books, 1959
- The Distinctive Elements in Christianity. Edinburgh: T. & T. Clark, 1937.
- What Did Luther Understand by Religion? Philadelphia: Fortress Press, 1977.

== See also ==
- Theology of Martin Luther
