= Henry Jolles =

German pianist and composer

Henry Jolles (born Heinz-Frederic Jolles; 28 November 1902 – 16 July 1965) was a German pianist and composer. Uprooted from his native Germany by the rise of Nazism, he spent his last quarter-century in Brazil.

== Life ==
Jolles was born in Berlin to Dr Oscar Jolles and his wife, Gertrude (née Sternberg). His mother was Jewish but it is unclear if his father was also. Oscar, who had received a degree of Doctor of Philosophy at Jena University in 1886, was president and majority owner of the large printing and publishing company H. Berthold AG, and near the end of World War I the Kingdom of Württemberg would honor him with the Wilhelmkreuz, a recently created civilian decoration for merit in the war effort, for his management of that company's metals business. At age six, Jolles played for the celebrated virtuoso and composer Eugen d'Albert, who subsequently greatly influenced the boy's musical development.

After studying piano with Artur Schnabel and Edwin Fischer and composition with Paul Juon and, privately, with Kurt Weill, Jolles began to develop a successful performing career in the 1920s. His academic career also flourished, bringing appointment as professor at the Cologne Music Academy in 1928, at which point he moved from Berlin-Charlottenburg to Cologne. The ascendency of the Nazis brought an abrupt halt to this progress and several years of disruptions. In 1933, the regime directed Jolles's dismissal from his Academy position, and, by 1934, Jolles had moved to Paris to escape persecution. There, he had some success in re-establishing his performing career and, in 1940 or 1941, married Elisabeth Henriette Sauty de Chalon, but with the fall of France in 1940, Jolles came back into danger from the German occupation. Luck was with him, however, as he received assistance from American philanthropist Varian Fry. Jolles secured an entry permit into Brazil and able to flee France aboard a freighter from Marseille in 1942.

Once in Brazil, he settled in São Paulo and changed his name from "Heinz" to "Henry". His mother and sister were murdered in the Auschwitz concentration camp in 1943. He and his wife would remain residents of Brazil for the rest of their lives. Their sole child, a son named Olivier de Chalon Jolles, was born there in 1945. Olivier was a childhood friend of famous Brazilian composer Chico Buarque. They were both protagonists in a well-known episode in 1961 when, at ages 16 and 17 respectively, they were briefly arrested after a car theft.

In 1952, Hans-Joachim Koellreutter invited Jolles to accept a teaching position at the Escola Livre de Música in São Paulo. His students there included composer Henrique de Curitiba.

== Death ==
Jolles died in São Paulo in 1965, aged 63. His wife died there three years later, on 26 March 1968.

== Career ==
Jolles launched a successful career as a performer in the 1920s, earning a reputation as an accomplished performer of both classical and contemporary literature. In 1928 he performed the complete piano works of Franz Schubert in a series of recitals at the University of Heidelberg.

Upon fleeing Germany for France after 1933, Jolles met with some success in re-establishing his career, from 1935-39 leading the concert society "La Sonata", but the German invasion forced him to start yet again in Brazil. That disruption proved one too many; while he returned to touring in Europe in 1946 and in Germany in 1950, and around that time made long playing recordings for the American Haydn Society label, he was unable to recapture his earlier success. His sole surviving composition predating 1933 is a fragment of a work he wrote jointly with Weill for four pianos. Among his works after arriving in Brazil are piano pieces, a ballet based on Carmen, a sonata for violin and piano, and the song "Ultimo poema de Stefan Zweig,"; the last based on Stefan Zweig's "Letzte Gedicht", which the poet wrote on the occasion of his 60th birthday in November 1941.
