= Oskar Fleischer =

German musicologist (1856–1933)

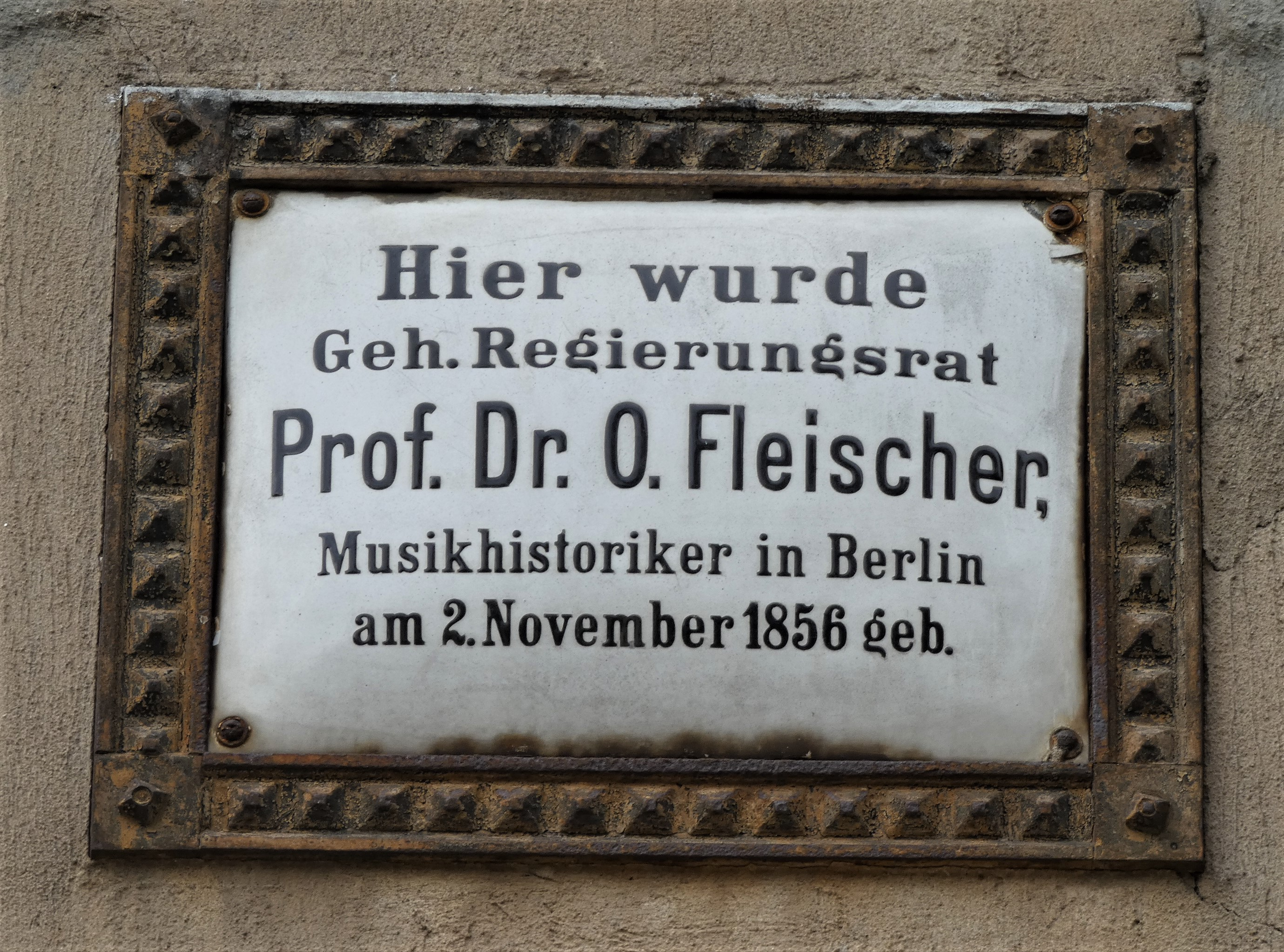
Commemorative plaque at Fleischer's birthplace in Zörbig, Radegaster Straße 4

Oskar Fleischer (2 November 1856 – 8 February 1933) was a German musicologist.

== Life ==
Born in Zörbig Anhalt-Bitterfeld, after attending the Latin secondary school at the Francke Foundations in Halle, Fleischer studied ancient and modern languages, history of literature and philosophy at the Martin Luther University of Halle-Wittenberg from 1882 to 1886 and was promoted to Dr. phil. He then completed a four-year degree in musicology (with Philipp Spitta) in Berlin. In 1888, he took over the management of the "Royal Collection of Ancient Musical Instruments" at the Berlin University of the Arts, whose holdings he was able to expand considerably with the acquisition of Snoeck's private collection. From 1892, he worked as a "Privatdozent", and from 1895 (until 1925) as an associate professor of musicology at the Humboldt-Universität zu Berlin. Among his best-known students were the Mozart scholar Hermann Abert, Komitas Vardapet and his successor Curt Sachs.

In 1899, he was a co-founder of the International Music Society and editor of its publication organs (Sammelbände der Internationalen Musikgesellschaft, Zeitschrift der Internationalen Musikgesellschaft). His main academic field was not so much the study of musical instruments but rather the study of medieval and ancient Greek chant scales (neume genesis). In the last years of his life, he became an outsider with his attempt to reconstruct a "Germanic neume script" and published in the völkisch-national journal Die Sonne. He was a "Geheimrat" (Privy Councillor).

Fleischer died in Berlin aged 76. After being reburied, he found his final resting place at the Stahnsdorf South-Western Cemetery near Berlin.

== Publications ==
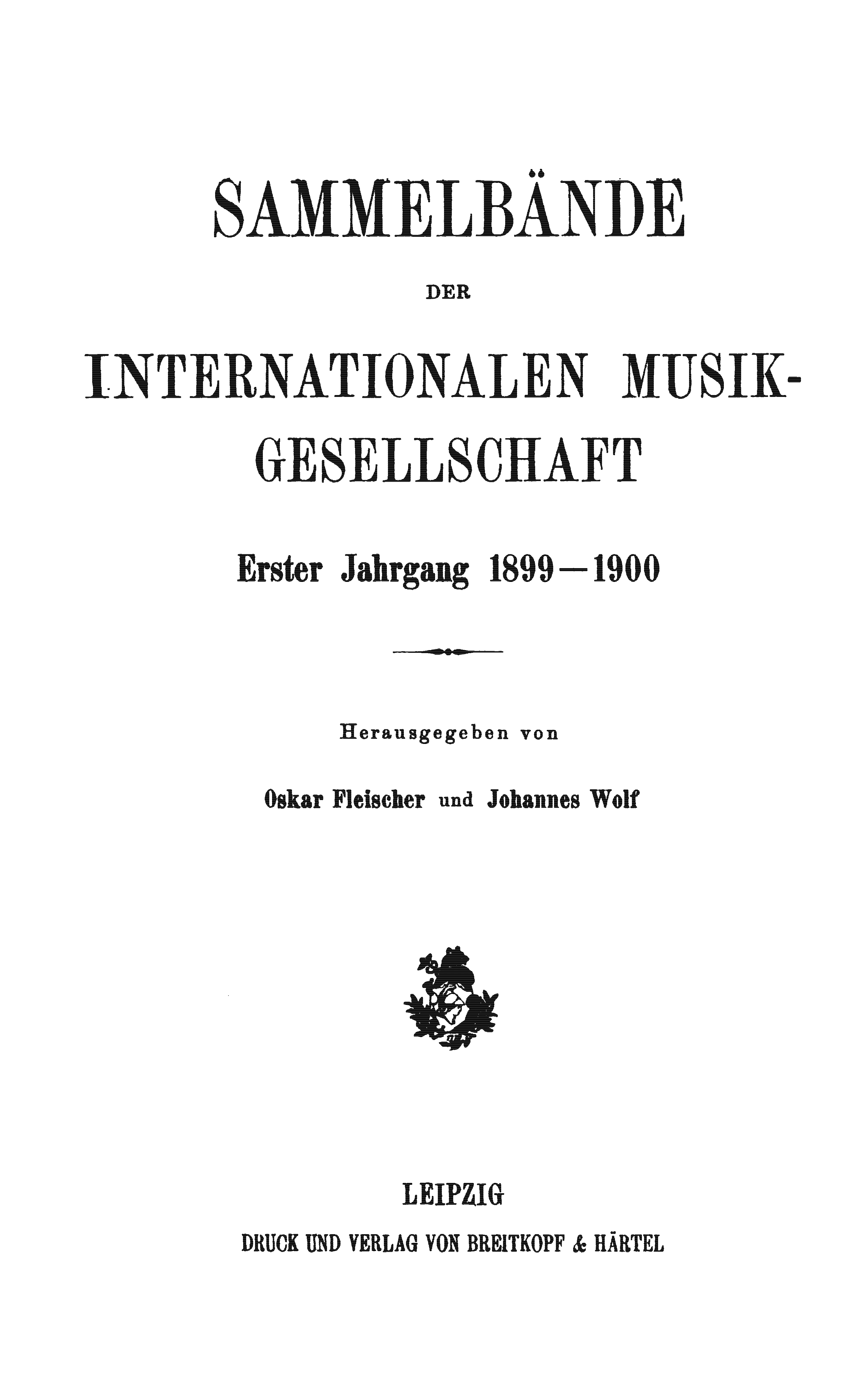

- Das Accentuationssystem Notkers in seinem Boethius, Halle 1882 (Diss.)
- Denis Gaulthier. In VfMw 2 (1886), pp. 1–180
- Neumenstudien. Abhandlungen über mittelalterliche Gesangs-Tonschriften. 3 volumes., vol.I, Leipzig 1895, vol.II, Leipzig 1897, vol.III, Berlin 1904
- Königliche Hochschule für Musik zu Berlin. Führer durch die Sammlung Alter Musikinstrumente, Berlin 1892
- Die Bedeutung der internationalen Musik- und Theaterausstellung in Wien für Kunst und Wissenschaft der Musik, Leipzig 1894
- Die Reste der altgriechischen Tonkunst, Leipzig 1899
- C.F. Weitzmann: Geschichte der Klaviermusik, Leipzig 1899 (Neubearbeitung mit Max Seiffert)
- Mozart (Geisteshelden Bd. 33), Berlin 1900
- Führer durch die Bach-Ausstellung im Festsaale des Berliner Rathauses, Berlin 1901
- Zur Phonophotographie. Eine Abwehr, Berlin 1904
- Musikalische Bilder aus Deutschlands Vergangenheit, Berlin 1913
- Vom Kriege gegen die deutsche Kultur – ein Beitrag zur Selbsterkenntnis des deutschen Volkes, Berlin 1915
- Eine astronomisch-musikalische Zeichen-Schrift in neolithischer Zeit, Berlin 1915
- Die germanischen Neumen als Schlüssel zum altchristlichen und gregorianischen Gesang, Frankfurt 1923
- Vor- und frühgeschichtliche Urgründe des Volkslieds. In Die Sonne. Monatsschrift für nordische Weltanschauung und Lebensgestaltung 5 (1928). pp. 193–200
