= Henrique de Curitiba =

- Born: Zbigniew Henrique Morozowicz; August 29, 1934; Curitiba, Paraná, Brazil
- Died: February 18, 2008 (aged 73)
- Education: Cornell University; Ithaca College
- Occupation: composer

Zbigniew Henrique Morozowicz, known as Henrique de Curitiba (August 29, 1934 – February 18, 2008) was a Brazilian composer. He chose the pseudonym "Henrique de Curitiba" to become known in Brazil and abroad under a more commonly and better pronounceable name.

Morozowicz was born in Curitiba, Paraná; his family had come to Curitiba in 1873 from Poland. His father was a dancer and choreographer and was known at La Scala in Milan, Italy. His mother was a pianist which brought little Henrique to music. He graduated at the Curitiba Music and Arts School in 1953 and worked as an organist at the city's cathedral. Morozowicz then moved to São Paulo to study piano under Henry Jolles and composition under H. J. Koellreuter at the Escola Livre de Música. He went to Poland in 1960 for further studies.

In 1981 Morozowicz received the master's degree at Cornell University and Ithaca College in New York, under the guidance of Karel Husa. He became a well-known and recognised composer as "Henrique de Curitiba". Morozowicz has composed more than 150 works, amongst them many choral works. He taught at Federal University of Paraná in the 1980s and 1990s, and at Universidade Federal de Goiás until 2006.

He died in Curitiba on February 22, 2008.
