= Paul Juon =

Russian composer (1872–1940)

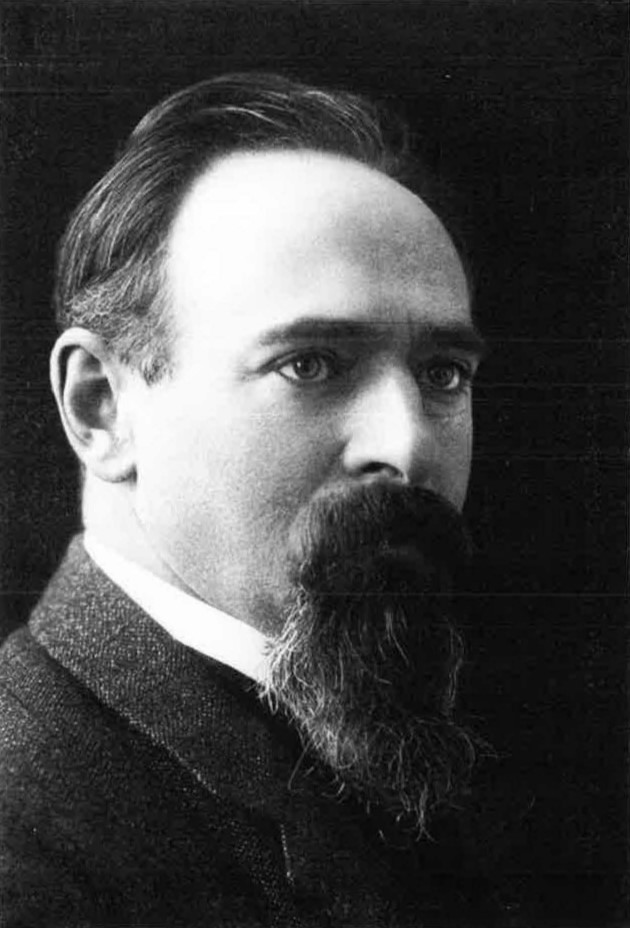
Paul Juon

Paul Juon (Russian: Па́вел Фёдорович Юо́н, Pavel Fyodorovich Yuon; 6 March 1872 – 21 August 1940) was a Russian composer of Swiss origin.

== Life ==
Juon was born in Moscow on 6 March 1872, the son of Theodor Friedrich Juon (1842–1912), an insurance official, and Emilie Gottwalt. His father was born in Goldingen, Courland Governorate, Russian Empire (now Kuldīga, Latvia), into a Swiss family originally from Masein, Grisons, while his mother was of Irish descent. Juon entered the Moscow Conservatory in 1889, where he studied violin with Jan Hřímalý and composition with Anton Arensky and Sergei Taneyev. He completed his studies at the Hochschule für Musik in Berlin, under Woldemar Bargiel. His first (privately) printed works, two Romanzen (lieder) appeared in 1894, the year he began studies with Bargiel.

Juon worked as a music teacher in Baku before moving to Berlin in 1897. During his time in Berlin he was a composition professor, employed by Joseph Joachim; his students included Hans Chemin-Petit, Werner Richard Heymann, Nikos Skalkottas, Henry Jolles, Pancho Vladigerov, Philipp Jarnach, Heinrich Kaminski, Lauri Ikonen, Max Trapp, Heino Kaski, Yrjö Kilpinen, Gerhart von Westerman, Hans Moltkau, Giannis Konstantinidis, Wilhelm Guttmann, Stefan Wolpe, Nicolas Nabokov and Gunnar Johansen. Juon was a member (1919) and later a senator of the Prussian Academy of Arts, which awarded him the Beethoven Prize in 1929. Juon retired to Vevey, Switzerland, in 1934, devoting himself exclusively to composing. He died in Vevey on 21 August 1940.

== Music ==
Juon's works include sonatas for viola, cello, winds, and three for violin (the third was recorded on a multi-LP set called Musik zwischen den Kriegen : eine Berliner Dokumentation); four symphonies (including one in manuscript) and a chamber symphony; four string quartets; several piano trios, piano quartets and piano quintets, and one sextet for piano and strings; a wind quintet; a number of concertante works, including three violin concertos and a triple concerto with piano trio; many piano works and lieder; and a number of stage works, including an opera, Aleko.

Several of these works have been recorded on compact disc, including some of the sonatas, two of the concertos, two of the symphonies, all four string quartets, the piano trios, and the three violin sonatas (Naxos 8.574091). He is known to have orchestrated Johannes Brahms' Hungarian Dance No. 4.

He also translated Arensky's 'Practical Studies in Harmony' into German.

The CD set "The Dawn of Recording: The Julius Block Cylinders," issued by Marston Records, includes recordings, dating from 1911, 1914 and 1915, of five brief excerpts from Juon's music: one selection for piano solo played by Juon, two selections for piano duet played by Juon and Leonid Kreutzer, one selection for piano solo played by Leonid Kreutzer, and one selection for violin and piano played by Eddy Brown and Julius Block.

== Personal life ==
Juon married his first wife, Katharina Schalchalova, in 1896; they had three children: Ina, Aja, and Ralf. Katharina died in 1911. In 1912, he married Marie Hegner-Günthert (called Armande), with whom he also had three children: Stella, Irsa and Rémi. He dedicated his Mysterien, Op 59 to Armande in 1928.

His younger brother was painter Konstantin Yuon.

== Works ==
- Aleko, opera, 1896
- Psyche, Op. 32, Tanzpoem, 1906
- The Golden Temple Book, stage music, 1912
- The Poor Broom Makers, stage music, 1913
- Five symphonies (1895-1936)
- Wächterweise in E major, Fantasie nach dänischen Volksl., for orchestra, Op. 31, 1906
- Violin Concerto in B minor, Op. 42, 1909
- Violin Concerto in A major, Op. 49, 1912
- Violin Concerto in A minor, Op. 88, 1931
- Episodes Concertantes for Piano Trio and Orchestra, Op. 45, by 1911
- Mysterien, a tone poem for Cello and Orchestra based on Knut Hamsun's Mysteries, Op. 59, 1928
- Four string quartets: D major, Op. 5 (1896), B minor, Op. 11 (1896), A minor, Op. 29 (1904), String quartet, Op. 67 (1916)
- Three violin sonatas, Op. 7 in A (1898), Op. 69 in F (1920) and Op. 86 in B minor (1930)

== Sources ==
- "Юон, Павел" . Brockhaus and Efron Encyclopedic Dictionary (in Russian). 1906.
