= Wilhelm Guttmann =

German composer

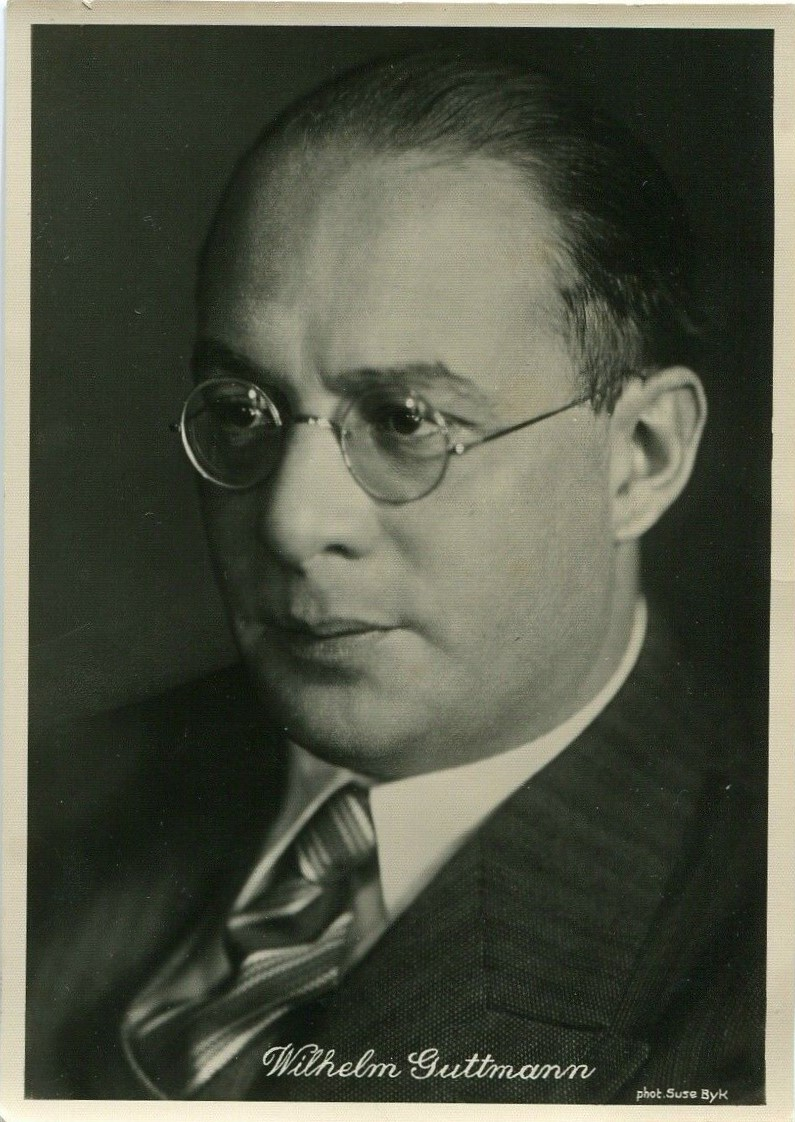
- Born: 1 January 1886; Berlin, Germany
- Died: 24 April 1941 (aged 55); Berlin, Germany
- Occupation: Composer

Wilhelm Guttmann (1 January 1886 – 24 April 1941) was a German composer. His work was part of the music event in the art competition at the 1932 Summer Olympics. He died in 1941 and was buried at the Stahnsdorf South-Western Cemetery near Berlin.
