= Daniel Sanders (lexicographer) =

German lexicographer (1819–1897)

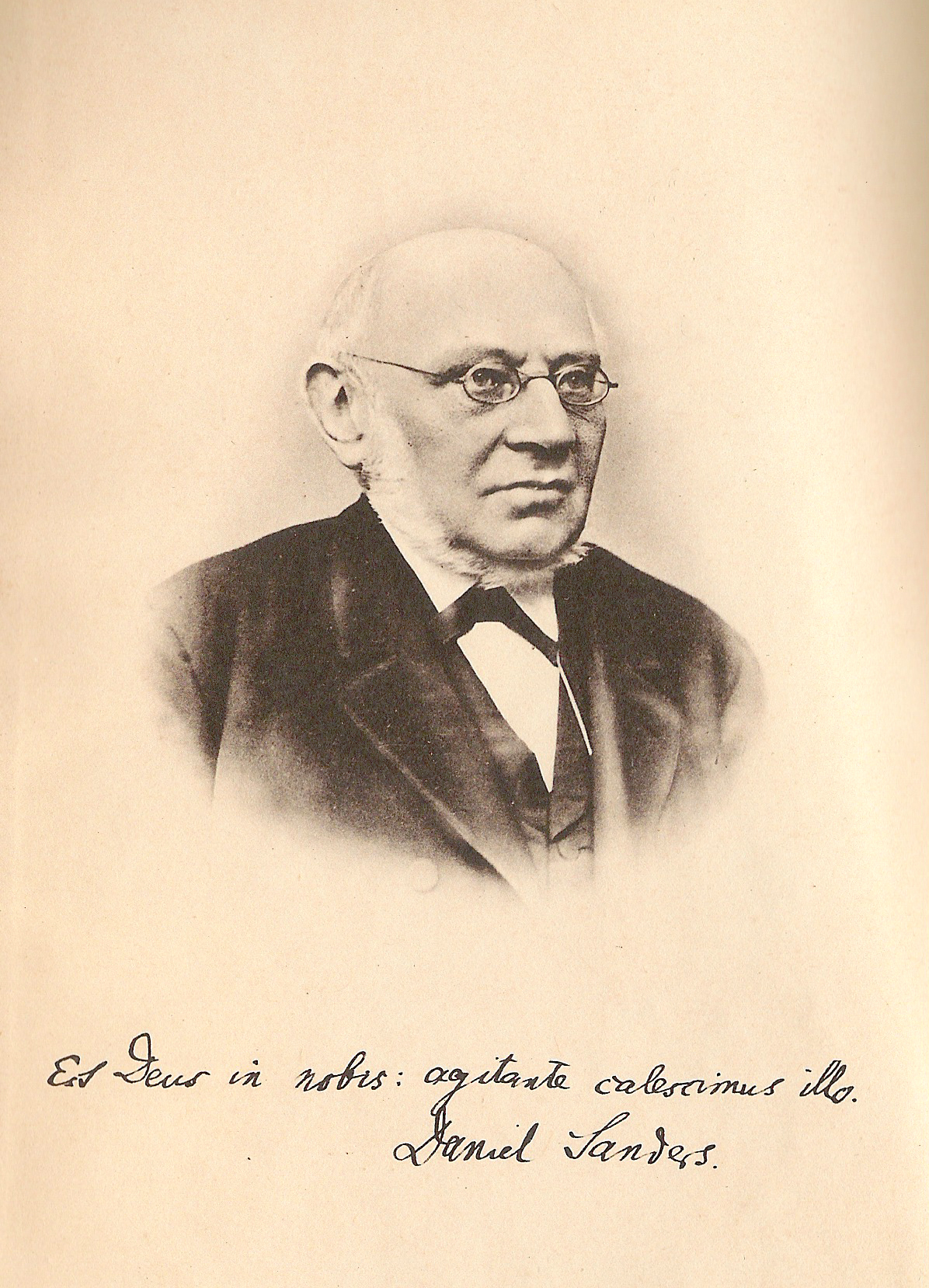
Daniel Sanders

Daniel Sanders (November 12, 1819, Strelitz – March 11, 1897, Strelitz) was a German lexicographer of Jewish parentage. He is best known for lexicons and dictionaries, including Der Große Muret Sanders.

== Biography and bibliography ==
Sanders received his elementary education at a local Jewish school before continuing his studies at the Gymnasium Carolinum in the nearby city of Neustrelitz. He then attended the universities of Berlin and Halle, where he studied classical and modern languages, mathematics, and natural history, ultimately earning a doctorate in philosophy. From 1842 to 1852, he worked as a schoolteacher at his former elementary school in Altstrelitz.

In 1852, Sanders began a detailed critique of the Grimms' Deutsches Wörterbuch, which he strongly opposed. This led to the publication of his own dictionary of the German language, Wörterbuch der Deutschen Sprache published from 1859 to 1865. He later published the Ergänzungswörterbuch der Deutschen Sprache (1878–1885). Other notable works by Sanders in the same field include Fremdwörterbuch (1871), Wörterbuch der Hauptschwierigkeiten in der Deutschen Sprache (1872), and Lehrbuch der Deutschen Sprache für Schulen in 3 Stufen (1888). Sanders also expressed his views in his Katechismus der Deutschen Orthographie (1856) and was an active participant in the orthographical conference held in Berlin in 1876.

Sanders also published a verse translation of the Song of Songs (1866), and wrote a collection of poems titled Heitere Kinderwelt (1868). In 1887, he founded the Zeitschrift fur die Deutsche Sprache, which he continued to edit almost until his death at Altstrelitz in the spring of 1897.
