= Langenscheidt =

German publisher

Langenscheidt Publishing Group
- Parent company: Klett
- Founder: Gustav Langenscheidt
- Country of origin: Germany
- Headquarters location: Berlin, Germany (formerly Prussia) since 1 October 1856
- Distribution: Worldwide
- Publication types: Dictionaries; Maps; Atlases Travel Products
- Nonfiction topics: Language references Travel guides
- Revenue: € 131 million (2010)
- Official website: langenscheidt.de

Langenscheidt (German pronunciation: [ˈlaŋənʃaɪt]) is a German publishing company that specializes in language reference works. In addition to publishing monolingual dictionaries, Langenscheidt also publishes bilingual dictionaries and travel phrase-books.

Langenscheidt has language-to-language dictionaries in many languages, including English, German, French, Spanish, Italian, Dutch, Swedish, Greek, Ancient Greek, Latin, Arabic, Chinese and Croatian, and in varying sizes, ranging from small travel pocket dictionaries to large desk sized ones.

== History ==
The Langenscheidt Publishing Group was founded on 1 October 1856 by Gustav Langenscheidt, in response to other publishers' refusal to publish his self-study materials for learning French, which he subsequently published under the title „ Unterrichtsbriefe zur Erlernung der französischen Sprache“ ("Teaching letters for learning the French language"). These learning materials became very popular and were widely read so much so that even today, Langenscheidt can be considered the "Father of distance education". From 1867, Langenscheidt Publishing Group had its own printing press.

From 1869 Langenscheidt worked with Karl Sachs and Césaire Villatte on the Encyklopädisches französisch-deutsches und deutsch-französisches Wörterbuch ("Encyclopedic French-German and German-French dictionary") and published it in 1880. In 1874, Langenscheidt was awarded the title of professor.

In 1891, in close collaboration with Eduard Muret and Daniel Sanders, he started working on the English equivalent, the Encyklopädisches englisch-deutsches und deutsch-englisches Wörterbuch ("Encyclopedic English-German and German-English dictionary"). Langenscheidt did not live to see its publication; his son Carl, his successor, published it in 1901.

From before 1870 to 1970, Langenscheidt bilingual dictionaries were popular among language students and various schools.

In 2019, Langenscheidt was acquired by Klett, owner of the competing dictionary Pons.

== Dictionary structure ==
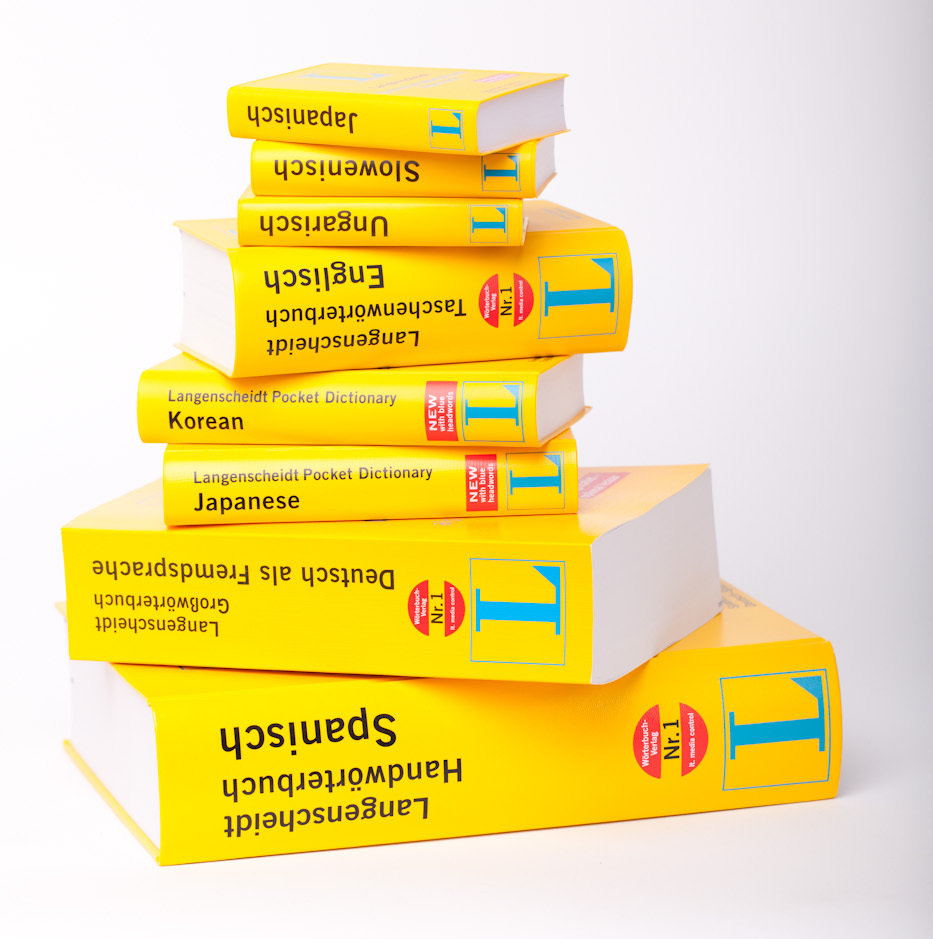
Langenscheidt dictionaries in various languages

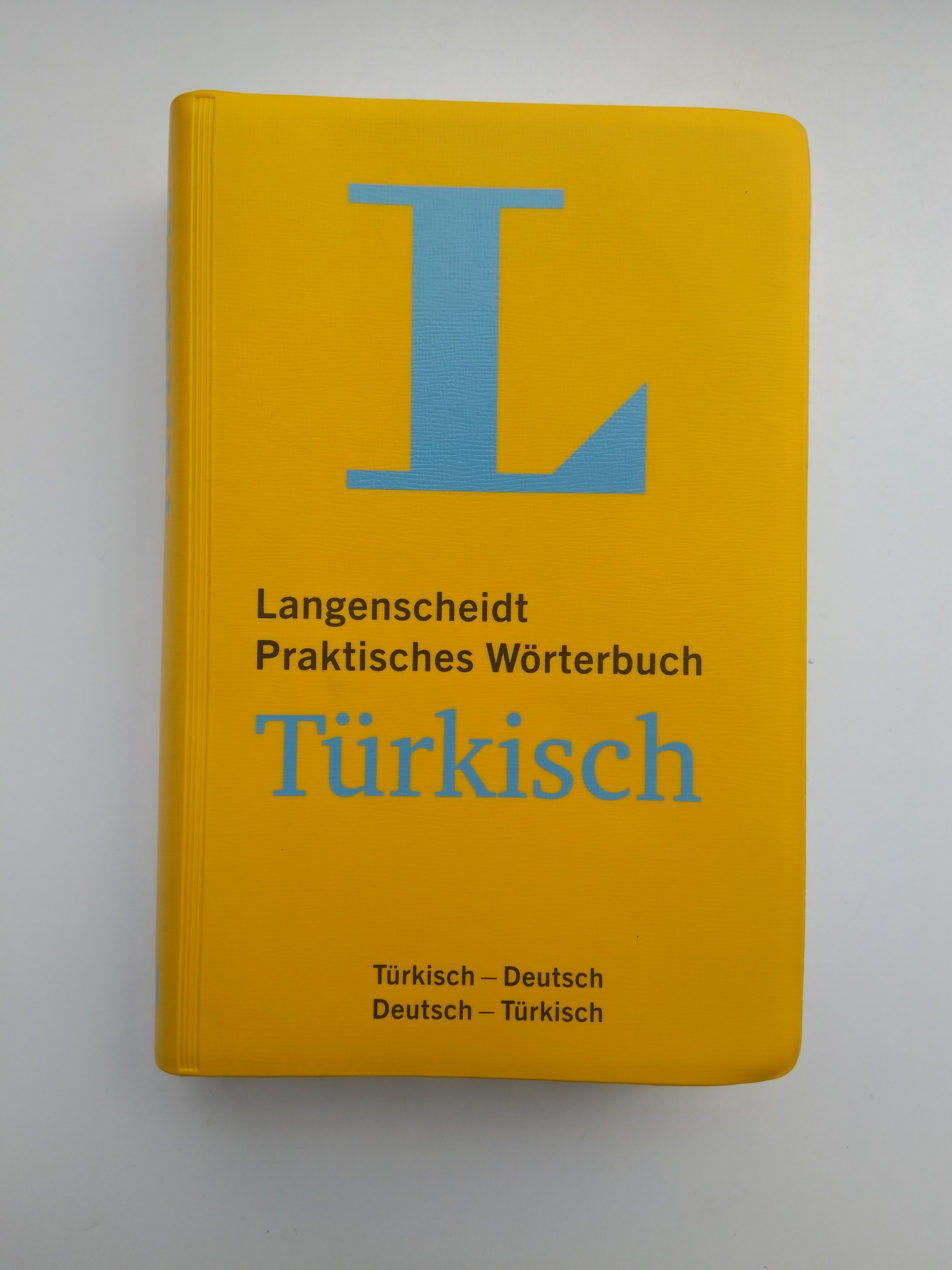
A 2015-printed Turkish to German (and vice versa) Langenscheidt dictionary with 55,000 words capacity

The structure for most Langenscheidt dictionaries is the same. Most pocket dictionaries include around 55,000 references designed for tourists or people studying beginning or intermediate foreign languages, while larger desk sized interlanguage dictionaries include around 220,000 references. After the two languages' references conclude, grammatical assistance appears in the Appendix section, including helpful abbreviations, geographical regions, currency values, temperature conversions, and numerical values.
