= Nikolaus Becker =

German lawyer and poet (1809–1845)

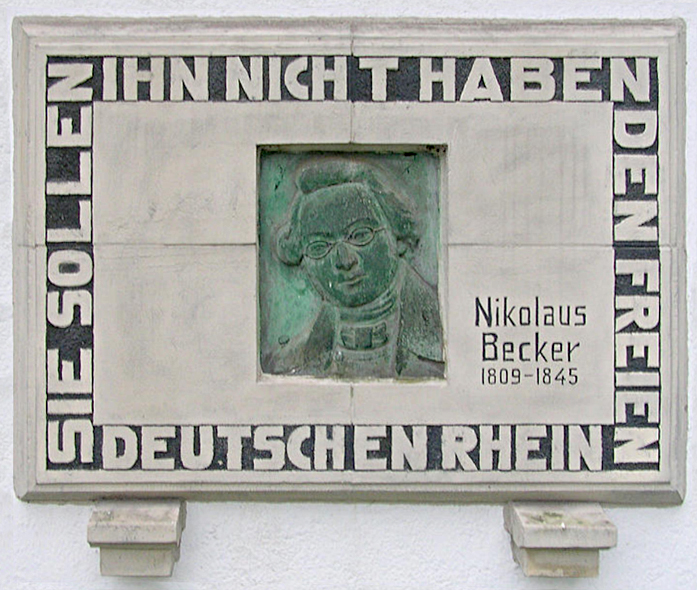
Plaque for Nikolaus Becker and his Rheinlied - "Sie sollen ihn nicht haben, den freien, deutschen Rhein ..." (They shall not have it, the free German Rhine)

Nikolaus Becker (8 October 1809, Bonn, Rhin-et-Moselle – 28 August 1845 in the Hünshoven district of Geilenkirchen) was a German lawyer and writer. His one poem of note was the 1840 Rheinlied (Rhine song) which was set to music over 70 times.

== The Rhine Song ==
With French–German enmity already about 200 years old, the poem was inspired by the Rhine crisis of 1840, caused by the French prime minister, Adolphe Thiers, who voiced demands that France should own the left bank of the Rhine (described as France's "natural boundary"), as France had done decades earlier during Napoleon's reign. In response, Becker wrote a poem called Rheinlied, which contained the verse: "Sie sollen ihn nicht haben, den freien deutschen Rhein ..." (They shall not have it, the free German Rhine).

1. Sie sollen ihn nicht haben,
Den freien deutschen Rhein,
Ob sie wie gier'ge Raben
Sich heiser danach schrein,

2. Solang' er, ruhig wallend,
Sein grünes Kleid noch trägt,
Solang', ein Ruder schallend,
In seine Wogen schlägt.

3. Sie sollen ihn nicht haben,
Den freien deutschen Rhein,
Solang' sich Herzen laben
An seinem Feuerwein;

4. Solang' in seinem Strome
Noch fest die Felsen stehn,
So lang' sich hohe Dome
In seinem Spiegel sehn.

5. Sie sollen ihn nicht haben,
Den freien deutschen Rhein,
So lang' dort kühne Knaben
Um schlanke Dirnen frein;

6. Solang' die Flosse hebet
Ein Fisch in seinem Grund,
Solang' ein Lied noch lebet
In seiner Sänger Mund!

7. Sie sollen ihn nicht haben,
Den freien deutschen Rhein,
Bis seine Flut begraben
Des letzten Manns Gebein.

Translation:

They shall not have it,
The free German Rhine,
Even if they cry like avaricious ravens
Until their voices are hoarse,

As long as it, flowing calmly,
Is of green colour,
As long as rudders sound
On its waves.

They shall not have it,
The free German Rhine,
As long as hearts refresh themselves
With its fiery wine;

As long as rocks
Stand firm in its current,
As long as big cathedrals
Are mirrored in its waves.

They shall not have it,
The free German Rhine,
As long as bold boys
Court beautiful girls;

As long as fish
Swim in its floods,
As long as poets
Write songs about it!

They shall not have it,
The free German Rhine,
Until its flood has covered
The last man's bones.

This patriotic poem brought him much praise throughout Germany. The Prussian King Friedrich Wilhelm IV sent him 1,000 Thaler, and King Ludwig I of Bavaria honoured him with a goblet. The Rheinlied was set to music over 70 times, amongst others by Robert Schumann, and other songs about the Rhine followed, the most famous being Die Wacht am Rhein by Max Schneckenburger.

The French answered, with Alfred de Musset: "Nous l'avons eu, votre Rhin allemand" (We've had him, your German Rhine) rubbing salt into the wounds Napoleon and others had caused, while Lamartine's "Peace Marseillaise" (1841) was peaceful.

He published a volume of more poems in 1841, but none achieved much popularity.
