= Tanunda =

Tanunda may refer to the following places and organisations in South Australia.

- Tanunda, South Australia, a town and locality
- Tanunda Liedertafel, a German language male choir
- Tanunda Town Band, a brass band
- Tanunda railway station, a former railway station

== See also ==
- Liedertafel (disambiguation)
