= Methfessel =

Methfessel is a German surname. Notable people with the surname include:

- Albert Methfessel (1785–1869), German composer, singer, musicologist, and conductor
- Friedrich Methfessel (1771–1807), German composer
