= Karl Wilhelm (conductor) =

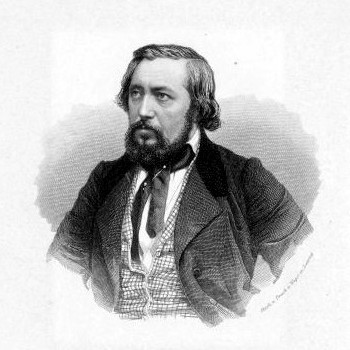
Karl Wilhelm

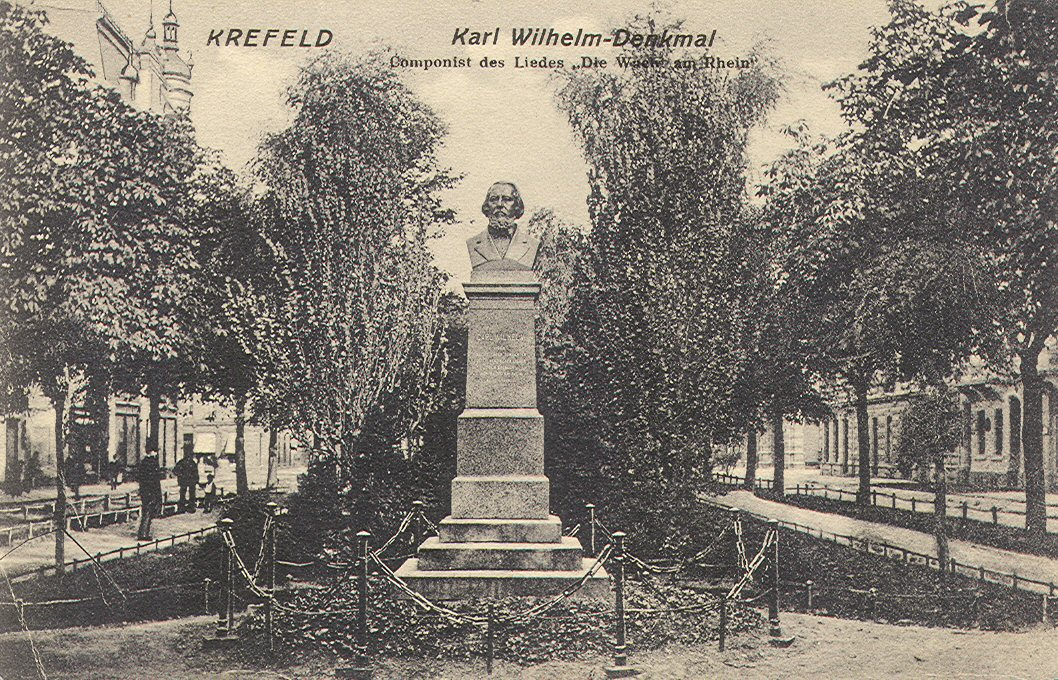
Monument to Karl Wilhelm in Krefeld

Karl Wilhelm, also Carl Wilhelm (5 September 1815, Schmalkalden – 26 August 1873, Schmalkalden) was a German choral director. He is best known as the composer of the music of the song “Die Wacht am Rhein.”

== Biography ==
Wilhelm was born in Schmalkalden. He studied at Cassel under Louis Spohr, and then in Frankfurt am Main with Aloys Schmitt and A. André. From 1841 to 1864 he was the director of the Krefeld Liedertafel for which he composed numerous male choruses. In Krefeld in 1854 he set to words “Die Wacht am Rhein,” the poem Max Schneckenburger wrote in 1840. In recognition of the success and the national importance of this song, he received the title of “Royal Prussian Musical Director” in 1860, and four years later received a gold medal from Queen (later Empress) Augusta.

On 24 June 1871, he received a personal acknowledgement from Chancellor of the German Empire Otto von Bismarck. In the same year, he received an annual gift from the government of 3,000 marks, which was then more than four times a typical salary.

From 1865 on, Wilhelm worked as the director of the music society in Schmalkalden, where he died eight years later.

== Sources ==
- Gilman, D. C.; Peck, H. T.; Colby, F. M., eds. (1905). "Wilhelm, Karl" . New International Encyclopedia (1st ed.). New York: Dodd, Mead.
