= Talheim, Tuttlingen =

Talheim
- Municipality
- Coat of arms

- Location of Talheim within Tuttlingen district
- Interactive map of Talheim
- Location within Germany Location within Baden-Württemberg
- Coordinates: 48°00′36″N 08°39′51″E
- Country: Germany
- State: Baden-Württemberg
- Admin. region: Freiburg
- District: Tuttlingen

Government
  - Mayor (2020–28): Andreas Zuhl

Area
  - Total: 13.12 km^{2} (5.07 sq mi)
- Elevation: 755 m (2,477 ft)

Population (2025-12-31)
  - Total: 1,331
  - Density: 101.4/km^{2} (262.7/sq mi)
- Time zone: UTC+01:00 (CET)
  - Summer (DST): UTC+02:00 (CEST)
- Postal codes: 78607
- Dialling codes: 07464
- Vehicle registration: TUT
- Website: www.gemeinde-talheim.de

Talheim (German pronunciation: [ˈtaːlhaɪm]) is a municipality in the district of Tuttlingen in Baden-Württemberg in Germany.

== People ==
- Max Schneckenburger (1819-1849), German poet
