= Liedertafel =

Liedertafel may refer to the following choral societies:

- Adelaide Liedertafel
- Berliner Liedertafel
- Hamburger Liedertafel
- Salzburger Liedertafel
- Tanunda Liedertafel
