= Hamburger Liedertafel =

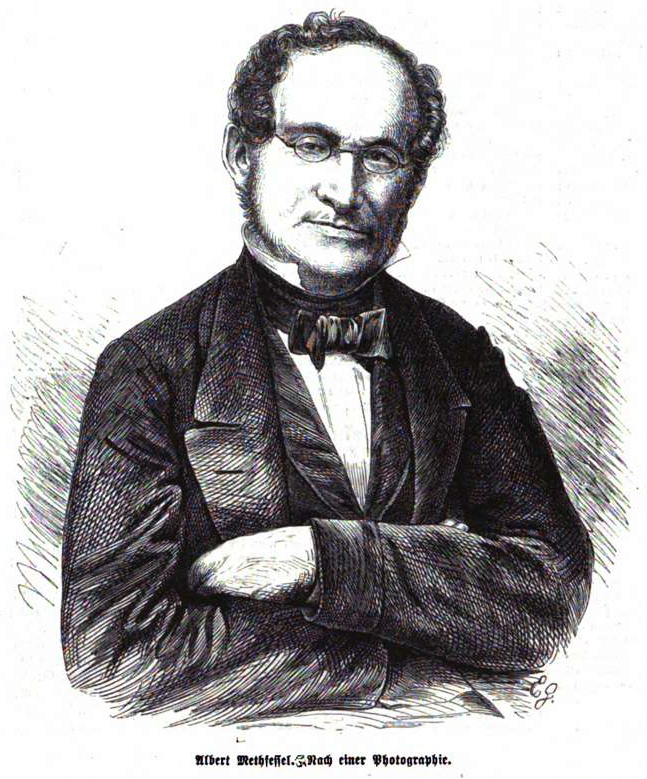
Albert Methfessel, founder of the choir

Hamburger Liedertafel is a choir in Hamburg, Germany, founded in 1823. The choir is one of the three oldest associations in Hamburg, and is entitled to have the city's coat of arms as its emblem.

== History ==
The choir was founded on 19 April 1823 by Albert Methfessel, who earlier in that year had organized the musical programme for the tenth anniversary festival in Hamburg of the Hanseatic Legion. It was the first men's choir in the city. The first "Liedertafel" had been the Berliner Liedertafel, founded in 1808, followed by others in Germany and Austria; it was a group of men who regularly met to socialize and sing.

The choir took part in important events in the city, and organized charity concerts. On 5 October 1841 the choir premiered the Deutschlandlied by Hoffmann von Fallersleben, which became the German national anthem. After the Great fire of Hamburg in 1842, the choir collected donations for victims, and later sang at the laying of the foundation stone of Hamburg City Hall.

== Present day ==
The choir has a varied repertoire, performing traditional and modern songs. It remains socially committed, and gives concerts in churches, local festivals, hospitals and retirement homes. Hamburger Liedertafel remained a men's choir until recently: a ladies' choir was formed in Hamburg in October 2023, and became part of the Liedertafel in June 2024.
