= Die Wacht am Rhein =

German patriotic anthem

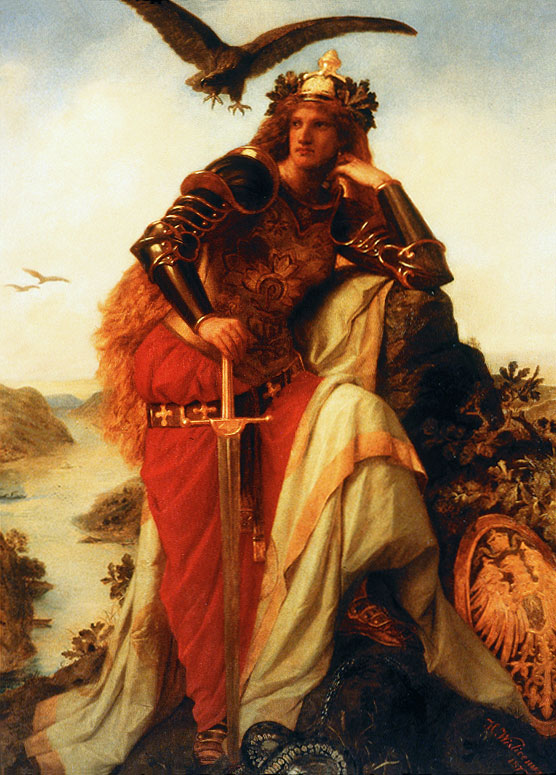
- Germania on Guard on the Rhine, Hermann Wislicenus, 1873
- Die Wacht am Rhein 1907 recording of "Die Wacht am Rhein"

"Die Wacht am Rhein" (German: [diː ˈvaxt am ˈʁaɪn], The Watch on the Rhine) is a German patriotic anthem. The song's origins are rooted in the historical French–German enmity, and it was particularly popular in Germany during the Franco-Prussian War, World War I, and World War II. The original poem was written by Max Schneckenburger during the Rhine crisis of 1840, and is generally sung to music written by Karl Wilhelm in 1854, seven years after Schneckenburger's death.

== Origin ==
Repeated French efforts to annex the Left Bank of the Rhine began with the devastating Nine Years' War. French forces occupied the Rhineland, pillaging much of Alsace and the Palatinate. France yet again occupied the Rhineland during the Napoleonic Wars. In the two centuries from the Thirty Years' War to the final defeat of Napoleon I, the German inhabitants of lands by the Rhine suffered from repeated French invasions.

Then during the Rhine Crisis of 1840, French prime minister Adolphe Thiers advanced the claim that the Upper and Middle Rhine River should serve as his country's "natural eastern border", which sparked a Rhine song movement in Germany. Germany feared that France was resuming her annexationist designs.

The Swabian merchant Max Schneckenburger, inspired by Nikolaus Becker's successful song "Der Deutsche Rhein", then wrote the poem "Rheinwache", which was later renamed to "Die Wacht am Rhein".

In the poem, with five original stanzas, a "thunderous call" is made for all Germans to rush and defend the German Rhine, to ensure that "no enemy sets his foot on the shore of the Rhine" (4th stanza). Two stanzas with a more specific text were added by others later. Unlike the older "Heil dir im Siegerkranz" which praised a monarch, "Die Wacht am Rhein" and other songs written in this period, such as the "Deutschlandlied" (the third verse of which is Germany's current national anthem) and "Was ist des Deutschen Vaterland?" (What is the German's Fatherland?) by Ernst Moritz Arndt, called for Germans to unite, to put aside sectionalism, sectarianism, and the rivalries of the various German kingdoms and principalities, to establish a unified German state and defend Germany's territorial integrity.

Schneckenburger worked in Restoration Switzerland, and his poem was first set to music in Bern by Swiss organist J. Mendel, and performed by tenor Adolph Methfessel for the Prussian ambassador, von Bunsen. This first version did not become very popular. When Karl Wilhelm, musical director of the city of Krefeld, received the poem in 1854, he produced a musical setting and performed it with his men's chorus on 11 June, the day of the silver anniversary of the marriage of Prinz Wilhelm von Preussen, later German Emperor Wilhelm I. This version gained popularity when sung at Dresden.

== Lyrics ==
The following is the complete text of the original five verses, plus additions.

German lyrics	German IPA	Literal translation	Nineteenth-century verse translation
Es braust ein Ruf wie Donnerhall, wie Schwertgeklirr und Wogenprall: Zum Rhein, zum Rhein, zum deutschen Rhein, wer will des Stromes Hüter sein?	[ɛs bʁaʊ̯st aɪ̯n ʁuːf viː dɔnɐˈhal] [viː ʃʋeːɐ̯tɡəˈklɪːɐ̯ ˀʊnt ˈvoːɡən pʁal] [tsuːm ˈʁaɪ̯n tsuːm ʁaɪ̯n tsuːm dɔʏ̯t͡ʃən ʁaɪ̯n] [ˈveːɐ̯ vɪl dəs ʃtʁoːməs ˈhyːtɐ zaɪ̯n]	There roars a call like a thunderclap, like clashing swords and splashing waves: To the Rhine, the Rhine, to the German Rhine, who wants to be a guardian of the river?	A wild cry leaps like thunder roar, Like glittering brand or wave to shore, The Rhine! the Rhine! the German Rhine! Who'll keep it when its foes combine?
Refrain Lieb Vaterland, magst ruhig sein, lieb Vaterland, magst ruhig sein, Fest steht und treu die Wacht, die Wacht am Rhein! Fest steht und treu die Wacht, die Wacht am Rhein!	[liːp ˈfaːtʰɐˌlantʰ maːkst ˈʁuː.ɪç zaɪ̯n] [liːp ˈfaːtʰɐˌlantʰ maːkst ˈʁuː.ɪç zaɪ̯n] [fɛst ʃteːt ˀʊnt tʁɔɪ̯ dɪ vaxt dɪ vaxt am ʁaɪ̯n] [fɛst ʃteːt ˀʊnt tʁɔɪ̯ dɪ vaxt dɪ vaxt am ʁaɪ̯n]	Chorus Dear fatherland, put your mind at rest, Dear fatherland, put your mind at rest, Firm and true stands the Watch, the Watch on the Rhine! Firm and true stands the Watch, the Watch on the Rhine!	Chorus; Dear Fatherland! no fear be thine, Dear Fatherland! no fear be thine, Great hearts and true watch by the Rhine; Great hearts and true watch by the Rhine.
Durch Hunderttausend zuckt es schnell, und aller Augen blitzen hell; der Deutsche, bieder, fromm und stark, (Note: alternative: der deutsche Jüngling, fromm und stark) beschützt die heil'ge Landesmark.	[dʊɪ̯ç ˌhʊndɐtˈtaʊ̯zn̩t t͡sʊkt əs ˈʃnɛl] [ˀʊnt ˀalɐ ˈˀaʊ̯ɡən ˌblɪtsən hɛl] [dɛɐ̯ ˈdɔɪ̯t͡ʃə ˈbiːdɐ fʁɔm ʊnt ʃtaɐ̯k] [bəˈʃʏt͡st dɪ haɪ̯lˈgə ˈlɑndəsmaɐ̯k]	Through a hundred thousand it quickly flickers, And everybody's eyes brightly flash; The German, honest, pious, and strong, (Note: alternative: the German youth, pious, and strong); Protects the sacred border of the land.	Through countless thousands thrills that cry, And lightning fills each patriot eye, And German youth devoutly brave, Protect the sacred frontier wave.
Er blickt hinauf in Himmelsau'n, wo Heldenväter niederschau'n, und schwört mit stolzer Kampfeslust: Du, Rhein bleibst deutsch wie meine Brust!	[ˀeːɐ̯ ˈblɪkt hɪˈnaʊ̯f ˀɪn ˈhɪməlsaʊ̯n] [voː hɛldənˈfɛːtɐ ˈniː.dɐʃaʊ̯n]	He looks up to the meadows of heaven, Where his heroic forefathers glance down, And swears with proud pugnacity: You, Rhine will remain German like my breast!	The ghost of many a German Knight; Looks down on us from his azure height, And as we gaze on Rhine's bright blue, We feel its tide is German too!
So lang ein Tropfen Blut noch glüht, noch eine Faust den Degen zieht, und noch ein Arm die Büchse spannt, betritt kein Feind hier deinen Strand!		As long as a drop of blood still glows, A fist still draws the sword, And one arm still holds the rifle, No enemy will here step on your shore!	So long as we have blood to tun, So long as we can hold a gun, So long as we can wield a brand, No foe, O Rhine, shall tread thy stand!
Additional stanza inserted between 4th and 5th (also sometimes inserted between the 3rd and 4th stanza)
Und ob mein Herz im Tode bricht, wirst du doch drum ein Welscher nicht. Reich, wie an Wasser deine Flut, ist Deutschland ja an Heldenblut!		And if my heart breaks in death, You won't become a Frenchman yet. As abundant with water is your flood, So is Germany in heroes' blood.	But if my heart in death be stayed, O seek for me no alien aid, For as the Rhine is rich in flood, So rich our land in hero blood!
6th stanza
Der Schwur erschallt, die Woge rinnt die Fahnen flattern hoch im Wind: Am Rhein, am Rhein, am deutschen Rhein wir alle wollen Hüter sein.		The oath rings out, the billow runs, The flags wave high in the wind: On the Rhine, on the German Rhine; We all want to be guardians.	Flows on thy wave, while spreads our vow, Lo! proud in air our flag flies now, "The Rhine! the Rhine! the German Rhine! We'll keep it, though our foes combine!"
Additional 7th stanza on war postcards of the First World War
So führe uns, du bist bewährt; In Gottvertrau'n greif' zu dem Schwert! Hoch Wilhelm! Nieder mit der Brut! Und tilg' die Schmach mit Feindesblut!		So lead us, you are tried and true; With trust in God, seize the sword! Hail Wilhelm! Down with all that brood! Wipe out the shame with enemy blood!	So lead us with your tried command, With trust in God, take sword in hand, Hail Wilhelm! Down with all that brood! Repay our shame with the foes' blood!

== Usage in Germany ==
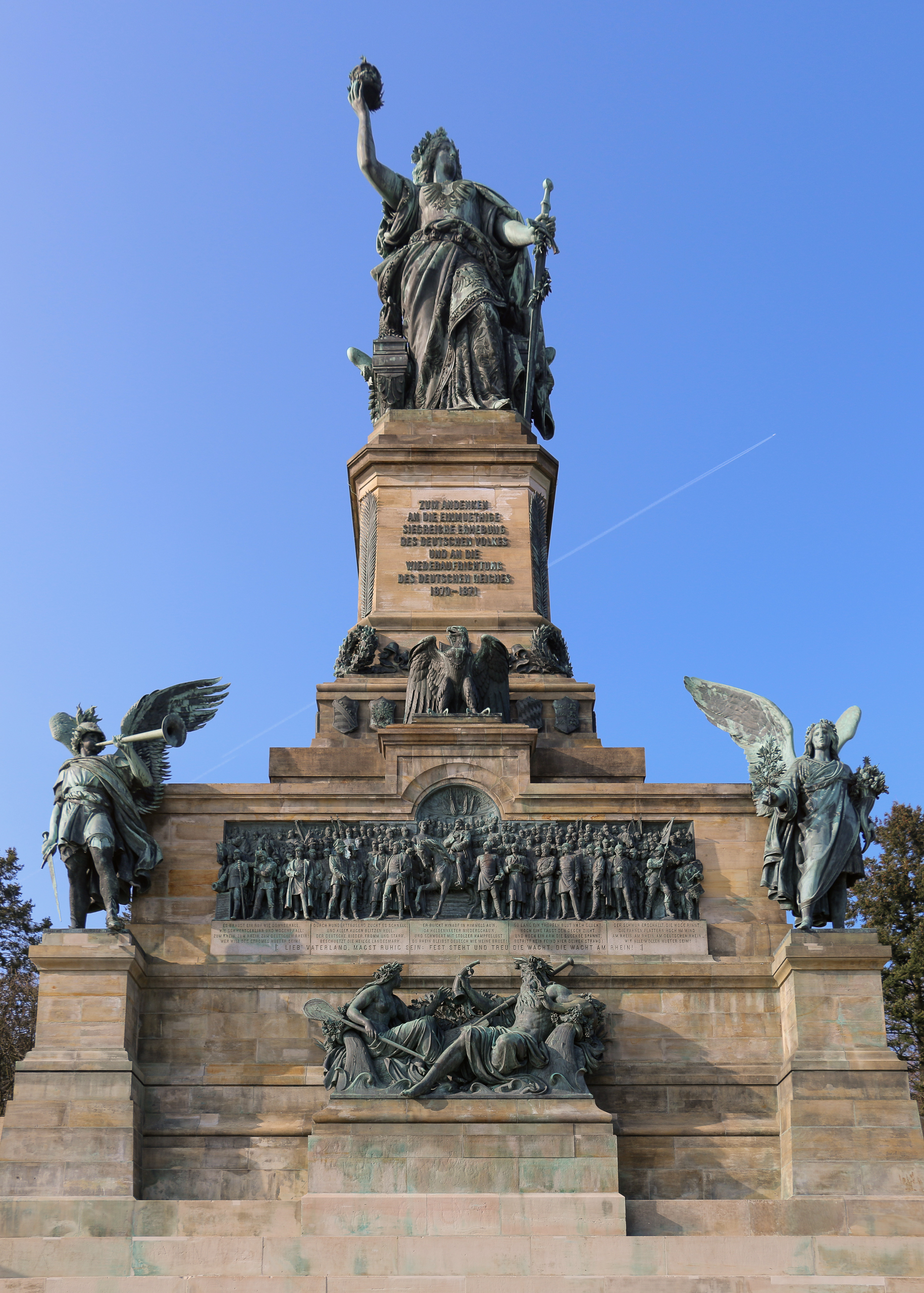
Niederwald monument with lyrics of Guard on the Rhine

During the Vormärz era and the Revolutions of 1848–1849, a Rhine romanticism movement arose, stressing the cultural and historical significance of the Rhine Gorge and the German territories on the river's left bank around the cities of Cologne, Worms, Trier and Speyer.

In response to the Ems dispatch incident, which occurred in Bad Ems, not far from the Rhine, France initiated the Franco-Prussian War of 1870–1871. When in the aftermath of the subsequent French defeat, the Prussian prime minister Otto von Bismarck achieved the Unification of Germany and the German Empire including Alsace–Lorraine was established, "Die Wacht am Rhein" — beside "Heil dir im Siegerkranz" — was the unofficial second national anthem. The song became famous, and both the composer and the family of the author were honoured and granted an annual pension by Bismarck.

The song's lyrics also appear on the 1883 Niederwald monument located just outside Rüdesheim am Rhein high above the river.

From World War I through to 1945, the "Watch on the Rhine" was one of the most popular songs in Germany, again rivaling the "Deutschlandlied" as the de facto national anthem. In World War II, the daily Wehrmachtbericht radio report began with the tune, until it was replaced by the fanfare from Liszt's Les Préludes in 1941.

The song's title was also used as the codename for the German offensive in 1944 known today as the Battle of the Bulge. However, the scenario envisioned in the song — i.e., an enemy approaching the Rhine and seeking to cross it, and patriotic German youths mobilizing en masse to defend the river with their lives — never came about in reality. Due to the German Army's preferred offensive strategy, the fighting in 1870–1871, 1914–1918 and 1940 all took place on French soil, far to the west of the Rhine. The same is true also for the German offensive in the 1944 Battle of the Bulge, which as noted used "Watch on the Rhine" as its code name, but actually took place away from the river. In 1945 Operation Plunder did result in a successful allied crossing of the Rhine, but by then Germany was on the verge of collapse, no longer capable of this kind of mobilization.

Today, the lands along the western bank of the Rhine between Switzerland and the Netherlands are mainly part of Germany. The Saarland, Rhineland-Palatinate and North Rhine-Westphalia are German federal states; Alsace and northern Lorraine are parts of France with a German cultural element to them. The French–German enmity was ended in 1963 with the Élysée Treaty and the implementation of the Franco–German friendship, so that the danger of an invasion that loomed for centuries over both nations no longer exists. The song has only historical significance in Germany, and is rarely sung or played.

== Stage and film ==
The song has figured in stage works and films.

The tune is quoted near the end of César Cui's opera Mademoiselle Fifi (composed 1902/1903), set in France during the Franco–Prussian War.

In Lewis Milestone's 1930 film All Quiet on the Western Front, the song is played at the end of the first scene as schoolboys, whipped into a patriotic frenzy by their instructor, abandon their studies and head off to enlist in the army. It is also heard in the background of the 1979 remake version of All Quiet on the Western Front when Paul (played by Richard Thomas) is preparing to board the train on his way to the front for the first time.

In Jean Renoir's 1937 film La Grande Illusion, two songs are juxtaposed in exactly the same way as in Casablanca five years later. In the latter movie, "Die Wacht am Rhein" was sung by German officers, who then were drowned out by exiled French singing La Marseillaise (which began as the "War Song for the Army of the Rhine", written and composed at the Rhine).

The song provides the title for Lillian Hellman's cautionary pre-World War II play Watch on the Rhine (1941) and the 1943 movie based on it.

In the first and second part of Rainer Werner Fassbinder's 1980 epic film adaptation of Alfred Döblin's Berlin Alexanderplatz (1929), Franz Biberkopf starts singing the song (as in the novel).

In John Ringo's science fiction novel Watch on the Rhine (2005), cannibal alien hordes landing in France advance towards Germany, and Germans prepare to block them at the Rhine.

In the parodic science fiction film Iron Sky (2012), the Nazis living on the far side of the Moon use the song's tune (with different lyrics) as their national anthem.

In François Ozon's 2016 film Franz, a portion of the song is sung by several German characters in a bar.

== Adaptations ==
The tune for the alma mater of Yale University, "Bright College Years", was taken from Karl Wilhelm's "Die Wacht am Rhein". New lyrics to the "splendid tune" were written by Henry Durand in 1881.

The tune is used by Doshisha University for its school song, "Doshisha College Song".

Italian poet Giovanni Pascoli also wrote new, patriotic lyrics to the song's tune, titled "La vedetta delle Alpi". They speak about a "guard on the Alps" (Alps play the part of the sacred boundaries, just as the Rhein river does in the original lyrics). The poem bears the subtitle "Twin anthem of the 'Wacht am Rhein'".

At the outbreak of the First World War a British song parodying the original "When We've Wound Up the Watch on the Rhine" enjoyed success.
