= Tanunda Town Band =

The Tanunda Town Band is an A-Grade Brass band, located in Tanunda, South Australia. The band is recognised as the oldest continuing brass band in the Southern hemisphere, having been established in 1857 (sometimes reported as 1860).

The band's instrumentation is in the English traditional brass band format, utilising B♭ cornets, E♭ soprano cornet, B♭ flugel horn, E♭ tenor horns, B♭baritones, B♭ euphoniums, tenor & bass trombones, B♭ and E♭ tubas and percussion. On occasion the band is augmented with a rhythm section of drum kit, guitar, piano, and bass. As a community band the members all volunteer their time and skills, with funds raised through sponsorship and performances directed towards the band's running expenses, purchases of music and instruments, and tuition grants.

Tanunda Town Band is a member of the South Australian Bands Association and competes in a number of competitions and festivals, most notably the South Australian State Championships and the Australian National Band Championships. In recent years the band placed 8th in the 2013 National Band A-Grade Championships held in Perth, Western Australia, and in recent history has won the SA A-Grade competition in 2014, 2013, 2011 and 2007. Tanunda Town Band won the National Championships in 1957.

Melodienacht is the band's annual concert, presented in the Tanunda Agricultural Shed ("The Show Hall") which draws an audience of over 2,000 people over the course of two nights. Held on the last Friday & Saturday of May, the program includes light-classical, pop, jazz, movie and theatrical songs, soloists from within the band, and local guest artists. In recent years the band has moved to use a headline special guest artist, beginning with Andy Seymour in 2013, James Morrison in 2014, and has recently announced Rachael Beck for 2015.
