= Max Schneckenburger =

German poet

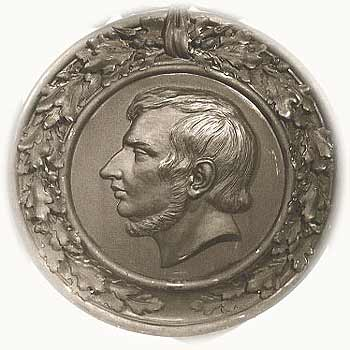
Medallion depicting Max Schneckenburger

Max Schneckenburger (17 February 1819 – 3 May 1849) was a German poet. The patriotic hymn "Die Wacht am Rhein" uses the text of a poem Schneckenburger wrote in 1840.

Schneckenburger was born in Talheim near Tuttlingen, Württemberg. The younger brother of Matthias Schneckenburger, he was a co-owner of an iron blast furnace company, and his business sent him across the Rhine River to Switzerland. Due to this connection, a first version of his poem was set to music and performed there in 1840 by local musicians. This Bern version is now largely forgotten. Schneckenburger died in Burgdorf near Bern.

The well-known music to his poem was composed by Karl Wilhelm in 1854, five years after Schneckenburger's death. After the use of the song in the Franco-Prussian War of 1870-71 made him and Wilhelm famous, his widow and two sons were granted an annual pension of 3,000 Mark by Otto von Bismarck's Reichskanzleramt. The rest of his German songs were published in Stuttgart in 1870.

On 18 July 1886, Schneckenburger's remains were returned to his native town Talheim in the German Empire.

== Quote ==
In a political essay of Schneckenburger in 1840, he calls for a re-arrangement of the "patch work" European borders into national areas, according to languages spoken, similar to the ideas espoused by Ernst Moritz Arndt.

Bei der ersten neuen Regulierung Europas muß die Schuhflickerorganisation des Wiener Congresses durch die einzig vernünftige und fürderhin einzig zulässige Eintheilung nach nationalen Grundlagen ersetzt werden. Und einer solchen Eintheilung ist es vorbehalten, Deutschland alle seine nach und nach entfremdeten Provinzen wiederzugeben, wobei Arndts Soweit die deutsche Zunge klingt als das richtige Schema für die Gründung eines neuen Deutschland angenommen wird.

He also called for secure borders with neighboring countries.

The Watch on the Rhein

A voice resounds like thunder-peal,
'Mid dashing waves and clang of steel: —
The Rhein, the Rhein, the German Rhein!
Who guards to-day my stream divine?

Chorus
Dear Fatherland, no danger thine:
Firm stand thy sons to watch the Rhein!

They stand, a hundred thousand strong,
Quick to avenge their country's wrong;
With filial love their bosoms swell,
They'll guard the sacred landmark well!

The dead of a heroic race
From heaven look down and meet their gaze;
They swear with dauntless heart, O Rhein,
Be German as this breast of mine!

While flows one drop of German blood,
Or sword remains to guard thy flood,
While rifle rests in patriot hand, —
No foe shall tread thy sacred strand!

Our oath resounds, the river flows,
In golden light our banner glows;
Our hearts will guard thy stream divine:
The Rhein, the Rhein, the German Rhein!

- Max Schneckenburger
