= French–German enmity =

1500s–1940s hostile relations between Germans and French

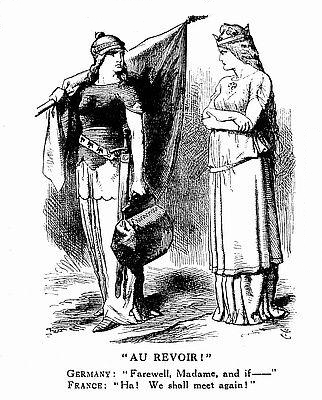
John Tenniel: Au Revoir!, Punch 6 August 1881

French–German (Franco–German) enmity (French: Rivalité franco-allemande, German: Deutsch-französische Erbfeindschaft) was the idea of unavoidably hostile relations and mutual revanchism between Germans (including Austrians) and French people that arose in the 16th century and became popular with the Franco-Prussian War of 1870–1871. It was an important factor in the unification of Germany (excluding Austria), World War I, and ended after World War II, when under the influence of the Cold War, West Germany and France both became part of NATO and the European Coal and Steel Community.

== France and the Habsburgs ==
Charles V's territories surrounding the Kingdom of France

In 1477, the Habsburg archduke Maximilian I of Austria, son of Emperor Frederick III, married Mary the Rich, the only child of the Burgundian duke Charles the Bold. Frederick and Charles had arranged the marriage, shortly before the duke was killed at the Battle of Nancy.

His ancestors of the French House of Valois-Burgundy over the centuries had acquired a collection of territories on both sides of the border of France with the Holy Roman Empire. It stretched from Burgundy proper in the south to the Low Countries in the north, somewhat resembling of early medieval Middle Francia. He had plans to raise Burgundian lands to the status of a kingdom (recreating the Kingdom of Lotharingia), but died at the Battle of Nancy (1477). Upon the duke's death, King Louis XI of France attempted to seize his heritage as reverted fiefs but was defeated by Maximilian at Battle of Guinegate (1479), who by the 1493 Treaty of Senlis annexed the Burgundian territories, including Flanders as well as French-speaking Artois and asserted the possession of the County of Burgundy (Franche-Comté).

Maximilian, Holy Roman Emperor from 1493, was also able to marry his son Philip the Handsome to Joanna of Castile, heiress to both the Crown of Castile and the Crown of Aragon. His grandson, Emperor Charles V, inherited the Low Countries and the Franche-Comté in 1506; when he by his mother also inherited Spain in 1516, France was surrounded by Habsburg territories and felt under pressure. The resulting tension between the two powers caused a number of conflicts, such as the Italian Wars or the War of the Spanish Succession, until the Diplomatic Revolution of 1756 made them allies against Prussia.

The Thirty Years War (1618–1648), was a complex conflict that took place in and around the Holy Roman empire, with religious, structural, and dynastic causes. France intervened in this conflict both indirectly, largely but not exclusively, on the side of various intervening Protestant powers, as well as directly from 1635 on. The 1648 Peace of Westphalia gave France limited control over Alsace and Lorraine. The 1679 Treaties of Nijmegen consolidated this result by bringing the towns under French control. In 1681, France occupied Strasbourg.

Meanwhile, the expanding Muslim Ottoman Empire became a serious threat to Christian Austria. The Vatican initiated a so-called Holy League against the "hereditary enemy" of Christian Europe ("Erbfeind christlichen Namens"). Far from joining or supporting the common effort of Austria, Brandenburg-Prussia, the other German states and Poland, France under Louis XIV of France invaded the Spanish Netherlands in September 1683, a few days before the Battle of Vienna. While Austria and the other German states were occupied with the Great Turkish War (1683–1699), France initiated the War of the Grand Alliance (1688–1697). The attempt to conquer large parts of southern Germany ultimately failed, when German troops were withdrawn from the Ottoman border and moved to the region. However, following a scorched earth policy that caused a large public outcry at the time, French troops, under notorious General Ezéchiel du Mas, Comte de Mélac, devastated large parts of the Palatinate, Baden and Württemberg burning down and levelling numerous cities and towns in southern Germany.

In the course of the Seven Years' War and in view of the rising Kingdom of Prussia, which had concluded the neutrality Treaty of Westminster with Great Britain, France under Louis XV realigned their foreign policy. The Diplomatic Revolution instigated by the Austrian chancellor Wenzel Anton Kaunitz in 1756 ended the French-Habsburg enmity.

== France and Prussia ==
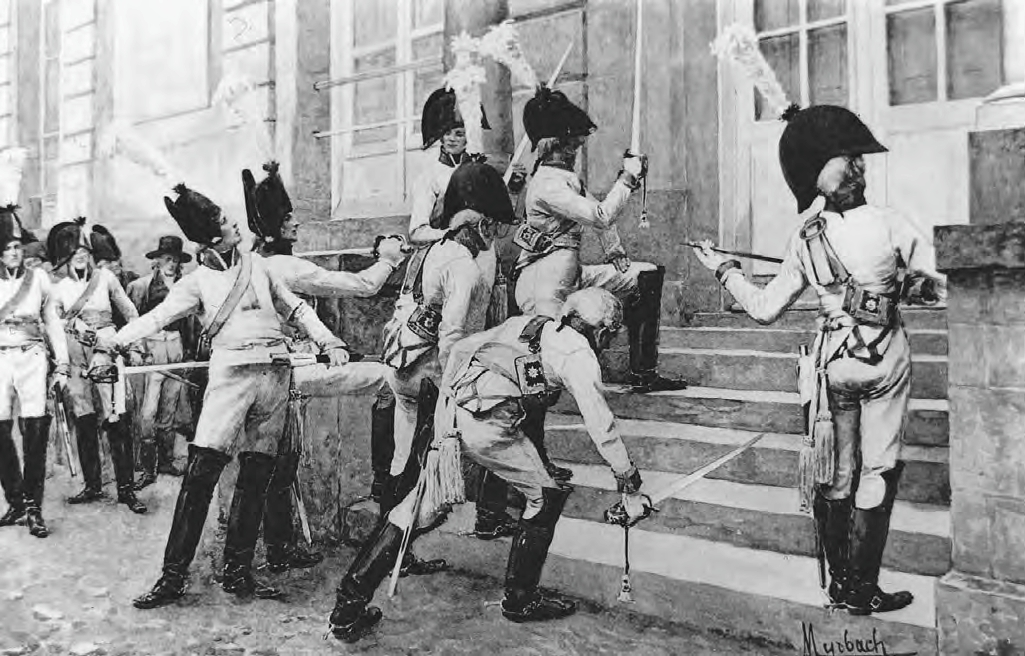
Officers of the Prussian Life Guards, wishing to provoke war with France, ostentatiously sharpen their swords on the steps of the French embassy in Berlin in autumn 1806.

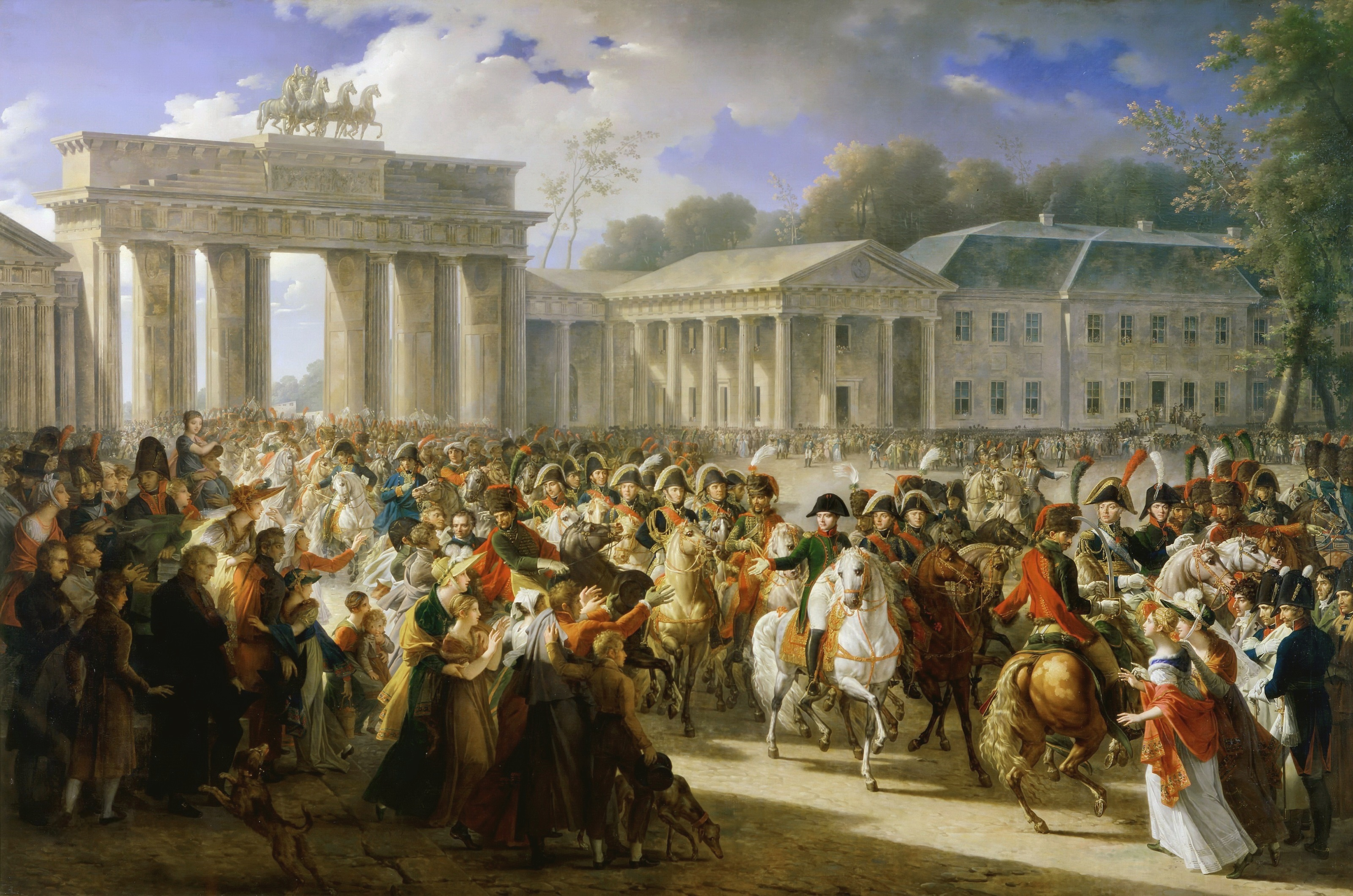
Entry of Napoleon into Berlin by Charles Meynier. 1810. French troops entering Berlin following the Battle of Jena in 1806. Symbolic beginning of the Franco–German enmity.

The Diplomatic Revolution as an alliance between France, the Habsburg Empire and Russia manifested in 1756 in the Treaty of Versailles and the following Seven Years' War against Prussia and Great Britain. Although an overall German nation-state was on the horizon, the loyalties of the German population outside of Prussia were primarily with smaller states. The French war against Prussia was justified through its role as guarantor of the 1648 Peace of Westphalia, and France was fighting on the side of the majority of German states, including Habsburg Austria.

The civil population still regarded war as a conflict between their authorities and distinguished between troops less according to the side on which they fought than according to how they treated the local population. The personal contacts and mutual respect between French and Prussian officers did not stop entirely while they were fighting each other, and the war resulted in a great deal of cultural exchange between the French occupiers and the German population.

The perception of war began to change after the French Revolution. The levée en masse for the Revolutionary Wars and the beginning formation of nation states in Europe made war increasingly a conflict between peoples rather than a conflict between authorities carried out on the backs of their subjects.

At the battle of Austerlitz (1805), Napoleon I put an end to the millennium-old Holy Roman Empire the next year. A year later, at the battle of Jena, French forces crushed the Prussian armies. Within two weeks of Jena, Napoleon had conquered almost all of Prussia except the area around Königsberg. The Prussian army, previously thought invincible, had been fought to almost the point of total liquidation. This humiliation led German philosophers (such as Clausewitz, Fichte, Arndt...) to play an important role for the development of German nationalism. It led politicians (such as Stein and Hardenberg) to reform Prussia in order to adapt their country to the new world brought about by the French Revolution.

The Continental System led Napoleon to directly incorporate German-speaking areas such as Hamburg into his First French Empire. Napoleon reshaped the map of Germany by the creation of the Confederation of the Rhine, which included vassal States ruled directly by members of the Bonaparte family (such as the Kingdom of Westphalia, and the Grand Duchy of Berg) and allied States who took advantage of the French protectorate to increase their territory and power (such as the Kingdom of Bavaria and the Kingdom of Saxony).

The Napoleonic Wars, often fought in Germany and with Germans on both sides, as in the Battle of the Nations at Leipzig, also marked the beginning of what was explicitly called French–German hereditary enmity. Modern German nationalism was born in opposition to French domination under Napoleon. In the recasting of the map of Europe after Napoleon's defeat, most of the German-speaking territories in the Rhineland adjoining France were put under the rule of Prussia and the remainder were ruled by Bavaria and Grand Duchy of Hesse.

== 19th century ==
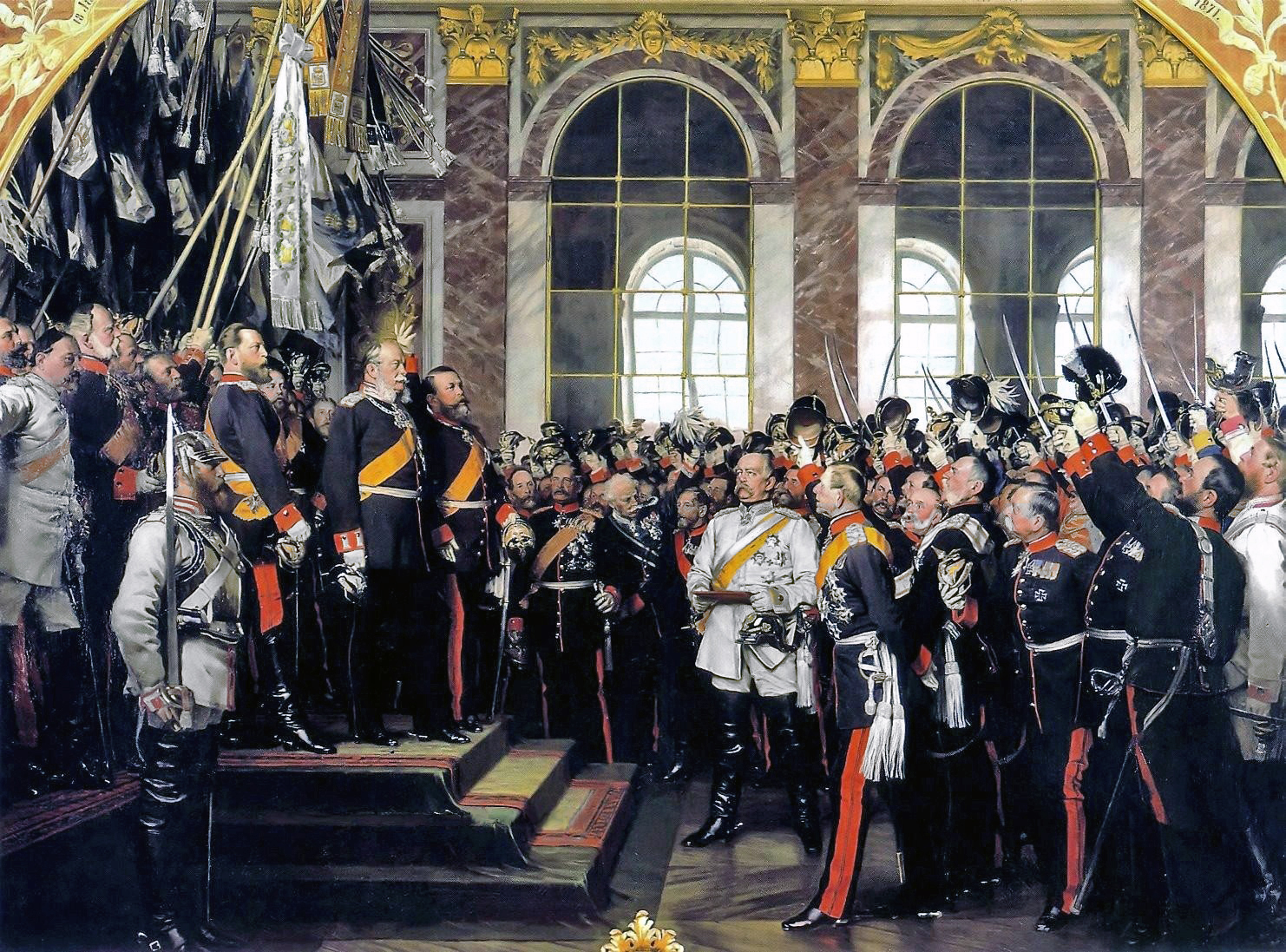
Proclamation of the German Empire in Versailles' Hall of Mirrors

During the first half of the 19th century, many Germans looked forward to a unification of most or all of the German states, but most German leaders and the foreign powers were opposed to it. The German nationalist movement believed that a united Germany (even without Austria) would replace France as the dominant land power in Western Europe. This argument was aided by demographic changes: since the Middle Ages, France had had the largest population in Western Europe, but in the 19th century, its population stagnated (a trend that continued until the second half of the 20th century), and the population of the German states overtook it and continued to rapidly increase. Following the Congress of Vienna in 1815, France had lost territories on the left bank of the Rhine, which had been annexed during the Revolutionary Wars.

The Rhine Crisis emerged from a combination of French imperial ambitions and the nationalist sentiments that were growing in both France and Germany. In 1840, French Prime Minister Adolphe Thiers reignited claims to these territories, asserting that the Rhine should be reinstated as France's natural eastern border. This demand was met with strong resistance from the other German states, particularly Prussia, which had regained control of these areas. This also significantly fueled German nationalism, as the defense of the Rhine became a symbol of national pride and unity among the German states. Nationalist songs, such as "Die Wacht am Rhein," gained popularity, reflecting the growing sentiment against French claims. This period marked a shift towards a more aggressive and mass-oriented German nationalism, as various social classes rallied to defend what they considered their "most German river".

== Franco-Prussian War ==
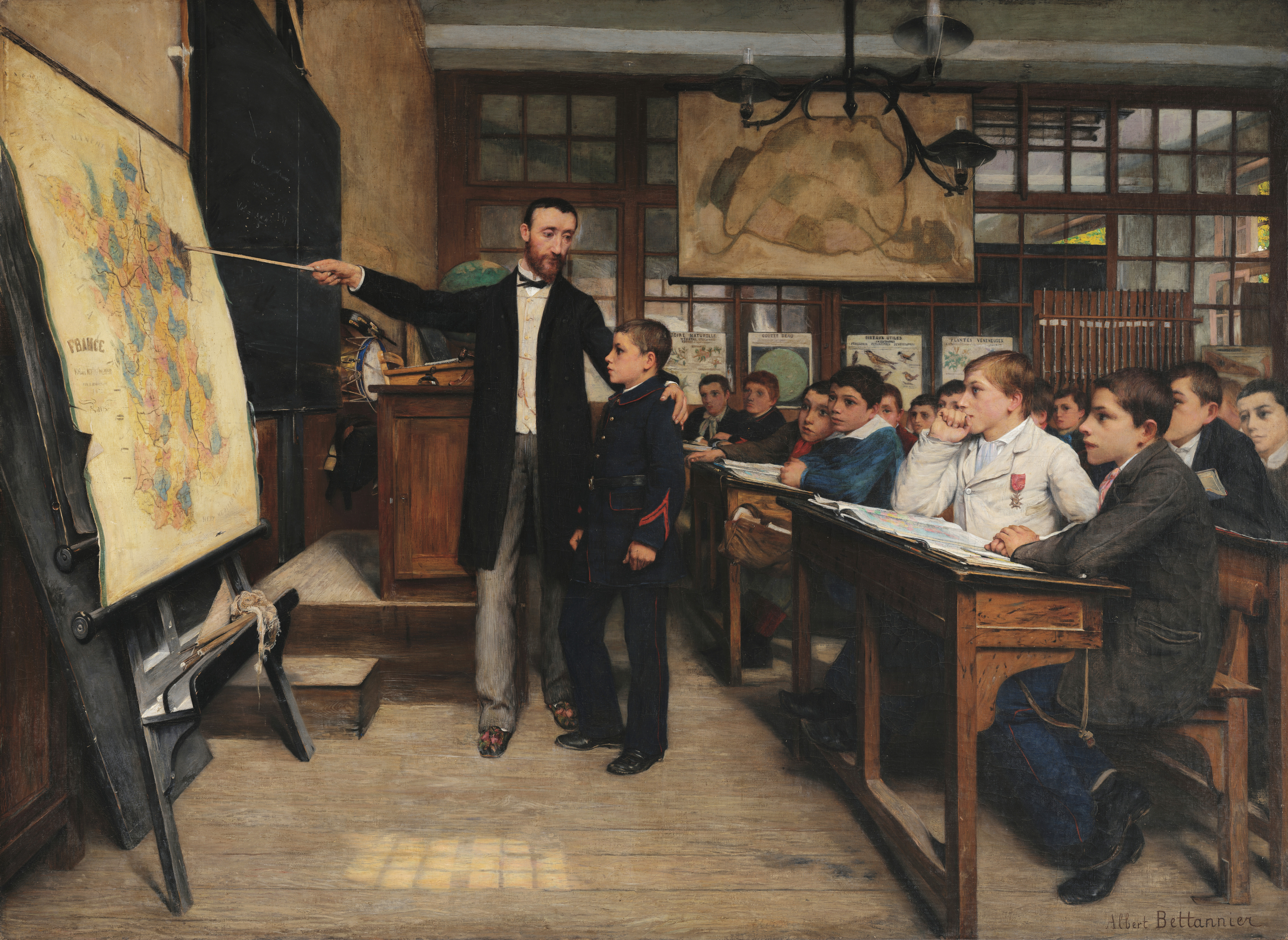
An 1887 painting depicting French boys taught not to forget the lost provinces of Alsace and Lorraine.

The unification of Germany, excluding Austria, was triggered by the Franco-Prussian War in 1870 and the French defeat. The military forces of Prussian and the other German states (excluding Austria) crushed the French armies at the Battle of Sedan. Finally, the Treaty of Frankfurt, reached after a lengthy siege of Paris forced France to cede the Alsace-Lorraine territory (consisting of most of Alsace and a quarter of Lorraine), of which most of the inhabitants spoke German dialects. France had to pay an indemnity of five billion francs to the newly declared German Empire. Thereafter, the German Empire had replaced France as the leading land power. Under Otto von Bismarck Germany was content--it had all it wanted so that its main goal was peace and stability. However, when it appeared Germany would decisively win in late 1870, German public opinion demanded it to humiliate France; the German Army favoured annexation to create more defensible frontiers. Bismarck reluctantly gave in--the French would never forget or forgive, he mistakenly calculated, so he might as well take the provinces. Germany's foreign policy fell into a trap with no exit. The only policy that made sense was trying to isolate France so it had no strong allies. However, France complicated Berlin's plans when it became friends with Russia. In 1905 a German plan for an alliance with Russia fell through because Russia was too close to France.

== Late 19th and early 20th centuries ==
=== Immigrant tensions ===
In the late 19th century and early 20th century, resentment existed between many nearby populations of French and German Americans, reflecting ethnic tensions on the European continent.

=== Nearly looming conflict between France and Germany ===
The incident happened in April 20, 1887, Schnaebelé was invited by a German colleague to meet at the Franco-German border for a discussion. However, upon his arrival, he was arrested by two agents of the German border guard, who were disguised as laborers. The arrest sparked immediate outrage in France, as it was perceived as a violation of French sovereignty, with claims that it occurred on French territory but Germans authorities accuse Schnaebelé espionage and trespassing over the Rhine fortresses. The French government, led by warhawk parties under Boulanger, reacted strongly, calling for an ultimatum against Germany. This incident occurred during a period of heightened nationalism and militarism in both countries, and the potential for conflict loomed large. The incident occurred between France and Germany, leading to fears nearly go to war. However, German Emperor William I intervened and ordered Schnaebelé's release, which occurred on April 30, 1887. This decision was seen as a move to de-escalate the situation and maintain stability in Europe. Despite the resolution, the Schnaebelé incident contributed to the growing animosity between the two nations and was part of a larger series of events known as the Georges Boulanger Affair, which involved various political and military tensions in France during that period. At same time, Chancellor Bismarck was pushing for an expensive new military law in Germany, and some historians speculate that the incident was used to justify heightened military readiness and taxation by stirring fears of war. However, Bismarck carefully managed the situation, communicating to the French ambassador that while he considered the arrest justified, Schnaebele’s release was necessary to honor international protocols.

== The World Wars ==
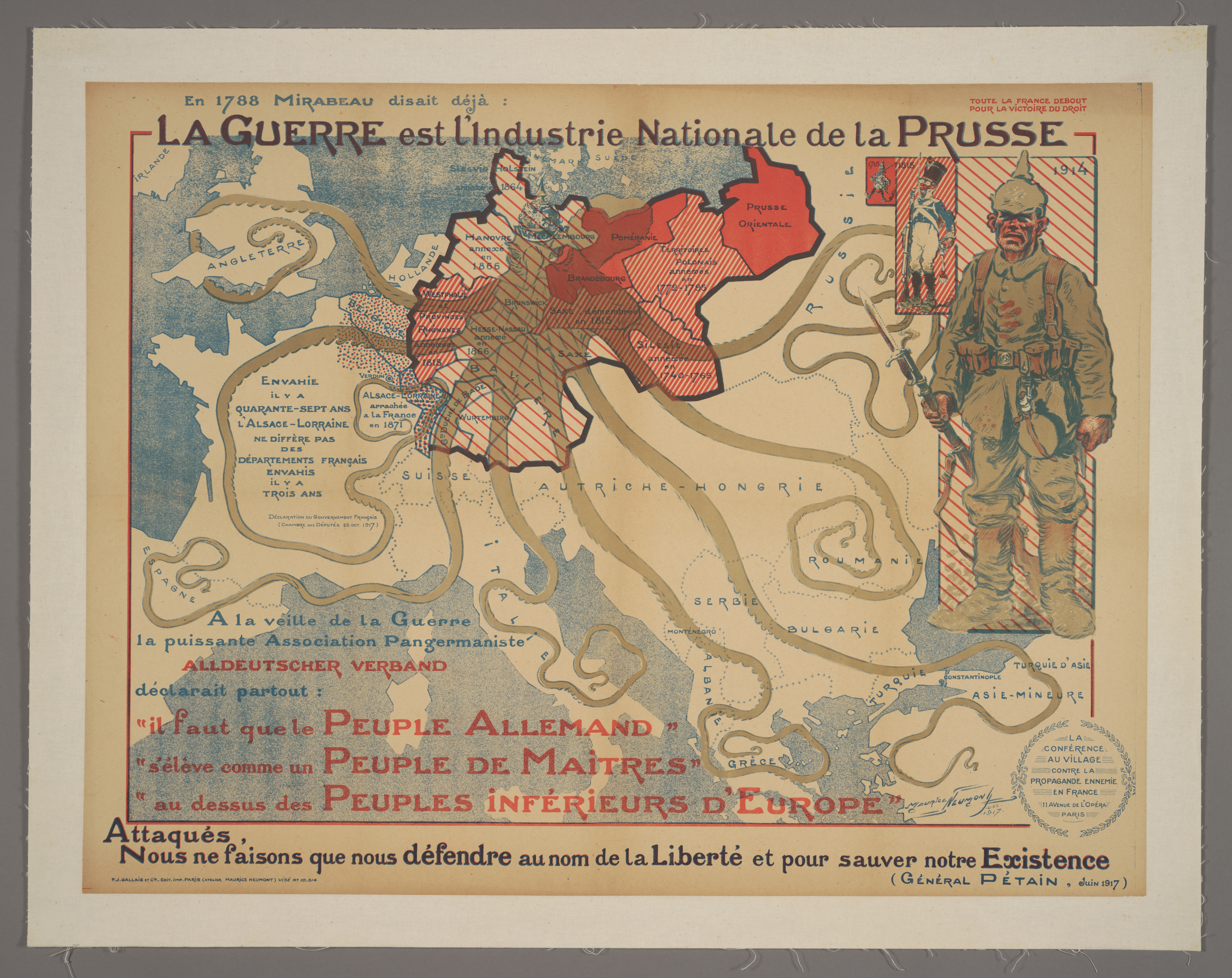
A French propaganda poster from 1917 portrays Prussia as an octopus stretching out its tentacles vying for control. It is captioned with an 18th-century quote: "Even in 1788, Mirabeau was saying that War is the National Industry of Prussia."

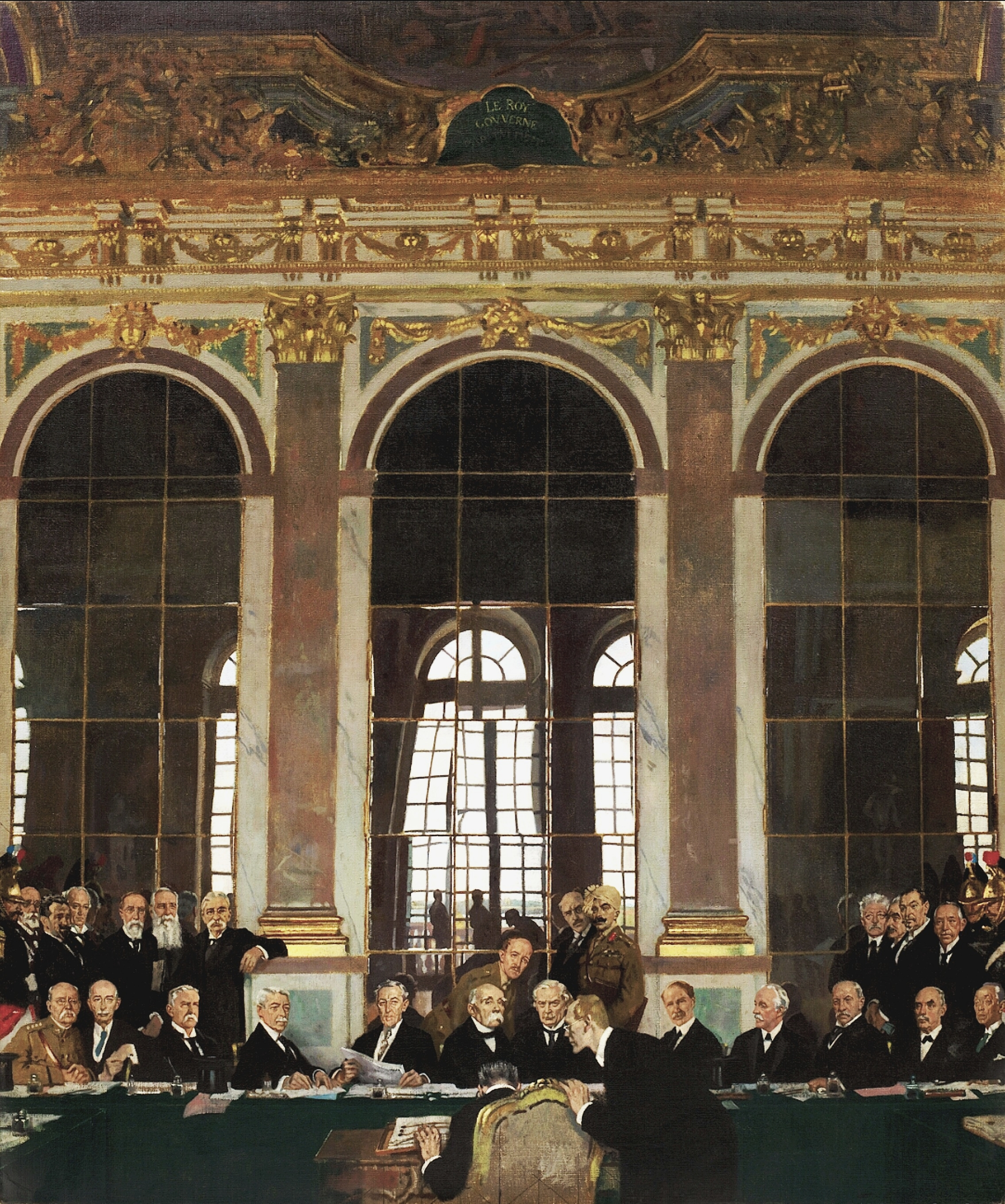
The signing of the Treaty of Versailles in the Hall of Mirrors, 28 June 1919.

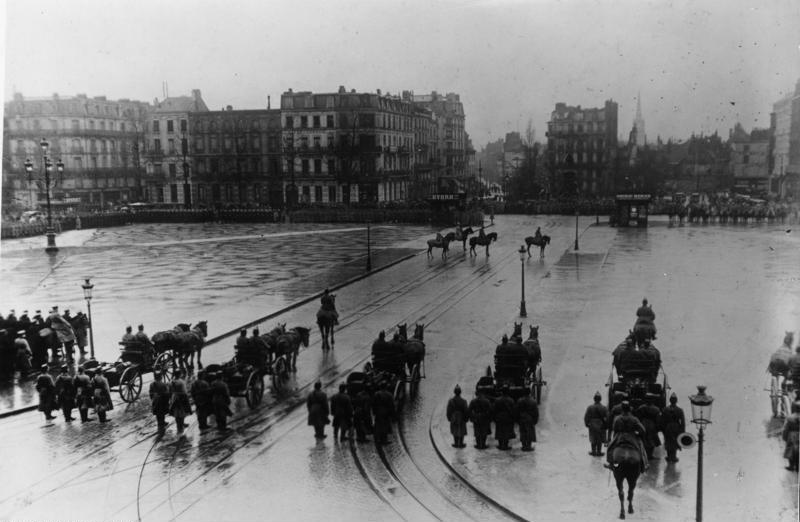
German troops conducting a military parade at Republic Square, Lille, during the Western Front, 1915.

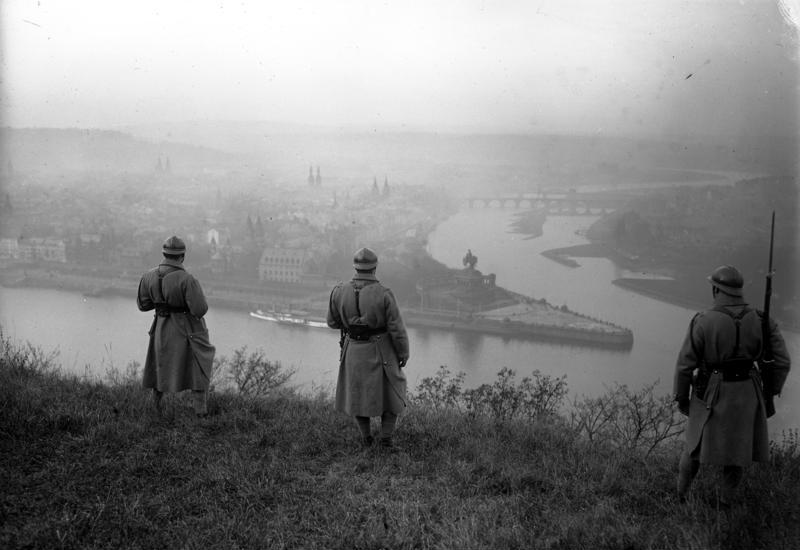
French troops observing the Rhine at Deutsches Eck, Koblenz, during the Occupation of the Rhineland.

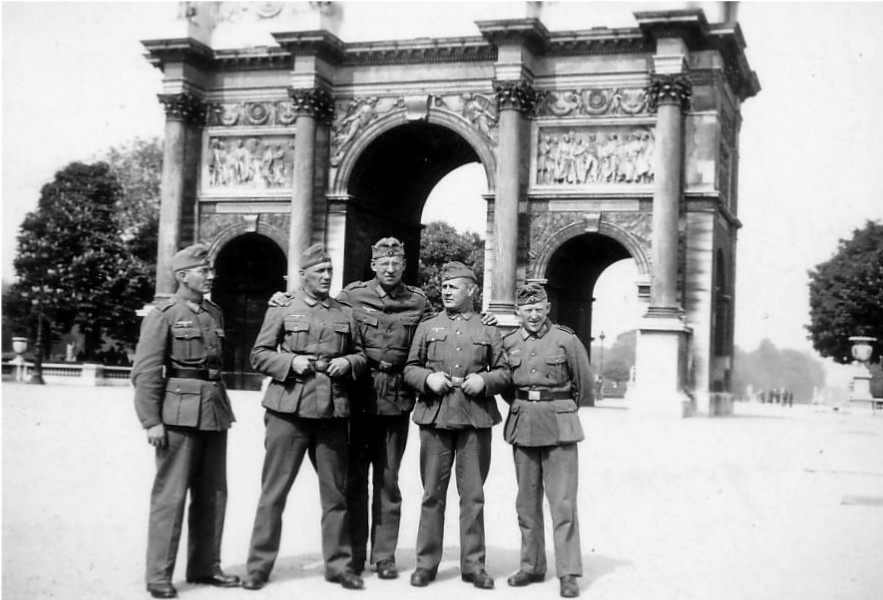
German Wehrmacht soldiers in front of the Arc de Triomphe du Carrousel, occupied Paris, 1940

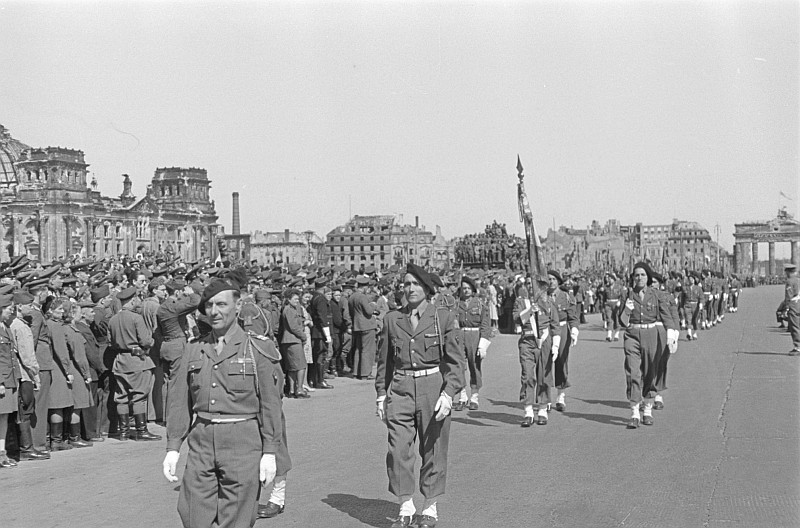
French occupation forces parading in front of Berlin's Reichstag at the end of World War II.

The desire for revenge (esprit de revanche) against Germany, and demands for the recovery of the "lost provinces" of Alsace and Lorraine was often heard in the 1870s. The short-term French reaction after 1871 was Revanchism: a sense of bitterness, hatred and demand for revenge against Germany, and demand for the return of the two lost provinces. Paintings that emphasized the humiliation of the defeat came in high demand, such as those by Alphonse de Neuville. However elite French opinion changed after about five years. The elites were now calm and considered it a minor issue. The Alsace-Lorraine issue was a minor theme after 1880, and Republicans and Socialists systematically downplayed the issue. J.F.V. Keiger says, "By the 1880s Franco–German relations were relatively good." Return didn't become a French war aim until after World War I began.

The Allied victory in 1918 saw France seize back Alsace-Lorraine and briefly resume its old position as the leading land power on the European continent. France was the leading proponent of harsh peace terms against Germany at the Paris Peace Conference. As the war had been fought mostly on French soil, it had destroyed much of the infrastructure and industry in Northern France, and France had suffered the highest number of casualties proportionate to population. Much of French opinion wanted the Rhineland, the section of Germany west of the Rhine and adjoining France's northeastern boundary, and the old focus of French ambition, to be detached from Germany as an independent country. In the end, the Americans and the British forced them to settle for a promise that the Rhineland would be demilitarized, and that heavy German reparation payments would be levied.

On the remote eastern end of the German Empire, the Memel territory was separated from the rest of East Prussia and occupied by France before being annexed by Lithuania. Austria, which had been reduced to roughly its German-speaking areas, excluding the Sudetenland (the mostly German-inhabited areas of the Czech lands) and South Tyrol, was forbidden to re-join its former fellow states of the Holy Roman Empire by joining Germany. In response to the German failure to pay reparations under the Treaty of Versailles in 1923, France returned with the Occupation of the Ruhr area of Germany, the center of German coal and steel production, until 1925. Also, the French-dominated International Olympic Committee banned Germany from the Olympic Games of 1920 and 1924, which illustrates the French desire to isolate Germany.

Under terms of Versailles, the French Army had the right to occupy the Rhineland until 1935, but in fact the French withdrew from the Rhineland in June 1930. As a number of the units the French stationed in the Rhineland between December 1918 - June 1930 were recruited from France's African colonies, this promoted a violent campaign against the so-called "Black Horror on the Rhine" as the German government and various grass-roots German groups claimed that the Senegalese units in the French Army were raping white German women on an industrial scale. Numerous German authors likened that France, the "hereditary enemy on the Rhine" had deliberately unleashed the Senegalese-who were always portrayed as animals or malicious children -- to rape German women. In the words of the American historian Daniel Becker, the campaign against the "Black Horror on the Rhine" centered "tales of sexual violence against German, bourgeois, white women that often bordered on the pornographic" and the campaign against the "Black Horror" by various German authors and associated international sympathizers "unleashed a rhetoric of violence, and radical nationalism that, as some scholars have argued, laid the groundwork for widespread support for the various racial projects of the Nazi regime." Additionally, the campaign against the "Black Horror on the Rhine" served to strengthen the demand for Germany to become the Volksgemeinschaft (People's Community") because only by becoming united in the Volksgemeinschaft could Germany again become strong enough to crush France and end the "Black Horror".

However, the UK and the US did not favor these policies, which were seen as too pro-French. Germany soon recovered economically and then from 1933, under Adolf Hitler, began to pursue an aggressive policy in Europe. Meanwhile, France in the 1930s was tired, politically divided, and above all dreaded another war, which the French feared would again be fought on their soil for the third time (the first 2 being 1870 and 1914), and again destroy a large percentage of their young men. France's stagnant population meant that it would find it difficult to withhold the sheer force of numbers of a German invasion; it was estimated Germany could put two men of fighting age in the field for every French soldier. Thus in the 1930s the French, with their British allies, pursued a policy of appeasement of Germany, failing to respond to the remilitarization of the Rhineland, although this put the German army on a larger stretch of the French border.

Finally, however, Hitler pushed France and Britain too far, and they jointly declared war when Germany invaded Poland in September 1939. But France remained exhausted and in no mood for a rerun of 1914–18. There was little enthusiasm and much dread in France at the prospect of actual warfare. After the Phoney War when the Germans launched their blitzkrieg invasion of France in 1940, the French Army crumbled within weeks, and with Britain retreating, an atmosphere of humiliation and defeat swept France.

A new government under Marshal Philippe Pétain called for an armistice, and German forces occupied most of the country. A minority of the French forces escaped abroad and continued the fight under General Charles de Gaulle (the "Free French" or the "Fighting French"). On the other hand, the French Resistance conducted sabotage operations inside German-occupied France. To support the invasion of Normandy of 1944, various groups increased their sabotage and guerrilla attacks; organizations such as the Maquis derailed trains, blew up ammunition depots, and ambushed Germans, for instance at Tulle. The 2nd SS Panzer Division Das Reich came under constant attack and sabotage on their way across the country to Normandy, suspected the village of Oradour-sur-Glane of harboring terrorists, arms and explosives, and wiped out the population in retaliation.

There was also a free French army fighting with the Allies, numbering almost 500,000 men by June 1944, 1,000,000 by December and 1,300,000 by the end of the war. By the war's end, the French army occupied south-western Germany and a part of Austria. French troops under the command of General Jean de Lattre de Tassigny destroyed and looted the town of Freudenstadt in the southern Black Forest (Schwarzwald) region for 3 days and perpetrated at least 600 rapes of German women of all ages there. Also various killings of civilians are recorded there. Mass rapes committed by French troops were also reported in the cities of Pforzheim, Stuttgart, Magstadt and Reutlingen.

When Allied forces liberated Normandy and Provence in August 1944, a victorious rebellion emerged in occupied Paris and national rejoicing broke out, as did a maelstrom of hatred directed at French people who had collaborated with the Germans. Women had their head shaved for the crime of horizontal collabortion. Some Germans taken as prisoners were killed by the resistance.

== Post-war relations ==
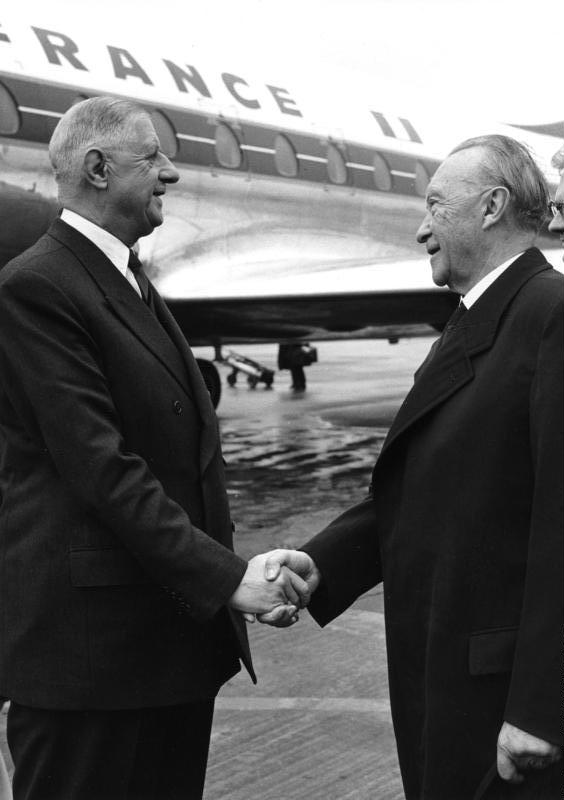
Charles de Gaulle and Konrad Adenauer in 1961

There was debate among the other Allies as to whether France should share in the occupation of the defeated Germany because of fears that the long Franco–German rivalry might interfere with the rebuilding of Germany. Ultimately the French were allowed to participate and from 1945 to 1955, French troops were stationed in the Rhineland, Baden-Württemberg, and part of Berlin, and these areas were put under a French military governor. The Saar Protectorate was allowed to rejoin West Germany only in 1957.

Kehl was turned into a suburb of Strasbourg. After the war, all citizens were expelled from Kehl. This state of affairs continued until 1953, when the city was returned to the Federal Republic of Germany and the refugees returned.

In the 1950s, the French and West Germans launched a new period of Franco–German cooperation that led to the formation of the European Union. Since then, France and Germany (West Germany between 1949 and 1990) have generally cooperated in the running of the European Union and often in foreign-policy matters in general. For example, they jointly opposed the US invasion of Iraq in 2003, leading US Secretary of Defense Donald Rumsfeld to lump them together as "Old Europe".

== Chronology ==
- 843: Treaty of Verdun: division of the Holy Roman Empire of Charlemagne into a Western Franconia realm (foundation of France), a central realm (Lorraine), and an Eastern Franconia realm (foundation of Germany).
- 1214: Battle of Bouvines
- 1250–1300: Philip IV of France's offensive territorial policy against the Holy Roman Empire
- 1477: After the death of Charles I, Duke of Burgundy, the territory of the Duchy of Burgundy was annexed by France. In the same year, Charles' daughter Mary of Burgundy married Archduke Maximilian of Austria, giving the Habsburgs control of the remainder of the Burgundian Inheritance. Although the Duchy of Burgundy itself remained in the hands of France, the Habsburgs remained in control of the other parts of the Burgundian inheritance, notably the Low Countries and the Free County of Burgundy.
  - 1477–82: War of the Burgundian Succession
- 1485-1488: Habsburg supported the Mad War.
- 1513: Battle of the Spurs
- 1618–48: Thirty Years' War
- 1667–68: War of Devolution
- 1672–78: Franco-Dutch War between the Netherlands and France expands to a European conflict in 1673–74
- 1683–84: War of the Reunions
- 1688: War of the Grand Alliance
- 1688–1702 Esechiel du Mas, Comte de Melac pursues a policy of death and destruction in SW Germany "Brûlez le Palatinat", countless cities, towns and villages were reduced to ashes
- 1701–14: War of the Spanish Succession between the Houses of Bourbon and Habsburg
- 1718: War of the Quadruple Alliance
- 1733–35: War of the Polish Succession between the Houses of Bourbon and Habsburg
- 1740–48: War of the Austrian Succession → main antagonists: France and Great Britain
- 1754 and 1756–63: Seven Years' War → Prussia, Great Britain, and Hannover against France, Austria, the Russian Empire, Sweden, and Saxony
- 1775–83: American Revolutionary War
- 1792–1815: French Revolutionary Wars
- 1792–97: War of the First Coalition: Prussia and Austria, since 1793 also Great Britain, Spain, the Netherlands, Sardinia, Naples, and Tuscany against French Republic. French occupation of the Rhineland.
- 1794: Holy Roman Empire and France, French occupation of Austrian Netherlands (1795–1806 Batavian Republic)
- 1799–1815: Napoleonic Wars
- 1803–06: War of the Third Coalition: France closes out the Holy Roman Empire.
- 1806–07: War of the Fourth Coalition: Prussia, Electorate of Saxony, Saxony-Weimar, and Brunswick against the French Empire. All Franco-Prussian battles were French victories of Napoleon I (including Battle of Jena–Auerstedt) ensuing this was the occupation of Prussia per the Treaties of Tilsit. Prussia was conquered by France in only 19 days.
- 1813: Battle of the Nations
- 1840: Rhine crisis: Rhine was a historic object of frontier trouble, between France and Germany; in 1840, the Rhine crisis evolved, because the French prime minister, Adolphe Thiers, started to talk about the Rhine border.
- 1848: Revolutions of 1848 grip the German states after French liberalism becomes popular with German peasants.
- 1870–71: Franco-Prussian War. The defeat of Napoleon III led to the unification of Germany, excluding Austria, in the German Empire under Prussian leadership.
- 1914–18: World War I, mostly fought in trenches in France
- 1923–30: French Occupation of the Ruhr.
- 1939–40: Battle of France. Victory of Hitler over the Allies (France, Great Britain et al). France was conquered by Germany in only 1 month and 12 days.
- 1940–42: North part of metropolitan France is occupied by Germany per the Second Armistice at Compiègne.
- 1942–44: Following the Anglo-American landing in French North Africa, the south part of France is occupied by Germany.
- 1944–45: Following the Allies landing in Normandy and Provence (including Free French forces), a Vichy French exile government is created in western Germany, the Sigmaringen enclave.
- 1945: The defeat of Germany during World War II led to the French occupation of parts of western Germany (and Berlin)
- 1963: Élysée Treaty of friendship between France and West Germany, signed by President Charles de Gaulle and Chancellor Konrad Adenauer

== See also ==
- France–Germany relations
- International relations (1814–1919)
- French–Habsburg rivalry
