= Friedrich Methfessel =

German composer

Friedrich Methfessel (27 August 1771 – 14 May 1807) was a German composer. At the instigation of his parents, Johann Christian Methfessel and Sophia Marie (née Gölitz) Methfessel, he studied theology at Leipzig University starting in 1796, but in his leisure time he studied guitar, piano, violin, and vocal performance.

He ultimately abandoned his theological career and became a preceptor at various towns, including Scheibe-Alsbach, Coburg, Mecklenburg, and Ratzeburg. Finding his sole passion was for music, he left church employment entirely and returned to his hometown of Stadtilm, where he taught music and concentrated on writing vocal music. The final year of his life was devoted to composing an opera, Faust, but he died before its completion. Along with works by his brother Albert Methfessel his works for voice and guitar were published by Breitkopf & Härtel and Nikolaus Simrock.
