= Albert Methfessel =

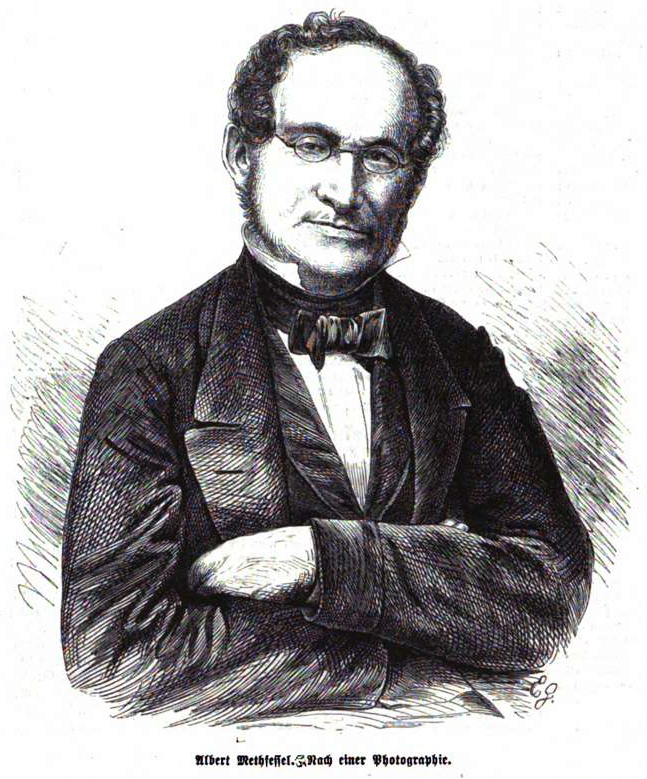
- Born: Albert Gottlieb Methfessel; 6 October 1785; Stadtilm
- Died: 23 March 1869 (aged 83); Bad Gandersheim
- Occupations: Composer; Singer; Educator

Albert Methfessel (6 October 1785 – 23 March 1869) was a German composer, singer, musicologist, and conductor. Originally destined by his parents for service in the church, like his older brother, he left theological studies because of his great interest in music. Given a scholarship by local nobility, he was able to formally study music, and then return to his hometown of Rudolstadt to perform and sing for twelve years. He spent three years in Hamburg before becoming an itinerant musician for seven years. His period of greatest income was as Kapellmeister in Braunschweig from 1832 to 1842. His career was then hampered by health difficulties, but he continued to compose, write musical treatises, and correspond with his fellow musicians until his death in 1869. He is most well known for his vocal compositions, in particular, his works for students and for male voices.

== Early life and family ==
Born Albert Gottlieb Methfessel in Stadtilm, Schwarzburg-Rudolstadt, on 6 October 1785, he was the son of Johann Christian Methfessel (1733–1816) and Sophia Marie (née Gölitz) Methfessel (1745–1818). Johann Christian was the local school teacher and Cantor in Stadtilm, while Sophia was the daughter of a Stadtilm church councilman. Albert's older brother Friedrich Methfessel (1771–1807) also became a song composer of note. He had two sisters, one of whom, Marie (1839–1927), married a clergyman.

== Education ==
From a very early age Albert showed a strong proclivity towards music. At the age of twelve, he wrote music for church services and these compositions were utilized by his father in his position of Cantor. His father fervently desired that he become a theologian, a desire that was heightened when older brother Friedrich, having attained a theological degree, abandoned his church career in pursuit of music. After his confirmation he was sent to the Rudolstadt grammar school. Here he was further attracted to music by the music of the prince's chapel, as well as the town choir, the latter of which he immediately joined and soon became its leader. As part of his functions for this position he composed cantatas and motets for the choir.

However, upon completion of his Rudolstadt studies he followed his father's wishes and attended Leipzig University from 1807 to 1809, studying theology and classical literature. He did not give up music during this time, as he joined the Gewandhaus as a singer. Karoline Luise von Schwarzburg-Rudolstadt became enamored with his voice, and proffered a scholarship which enabled Methfessel to abandon his theological studies and travel to Dresden, where he studied singing under Francesco Ceccarelli for nearly two years.

== Music career ==
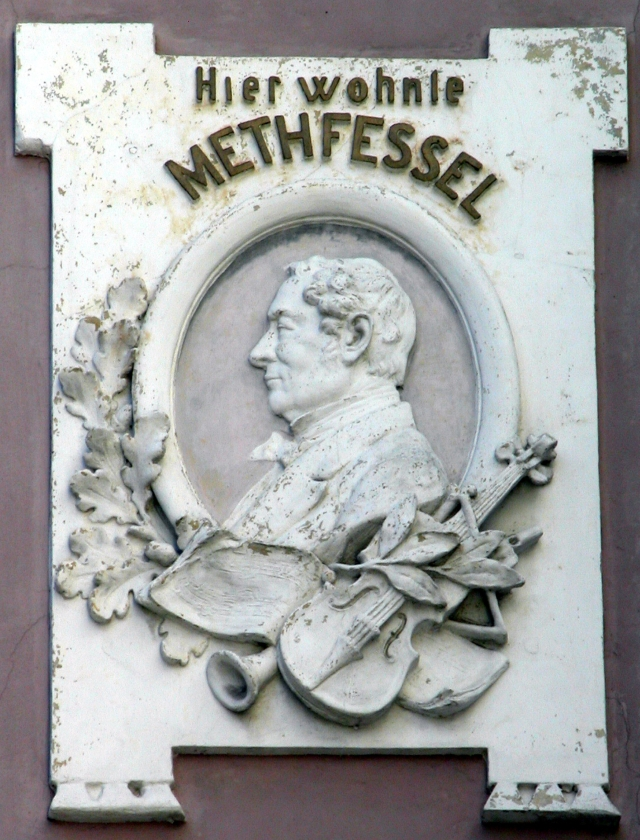
Plaque in Braunschweig commemorating a residence of Methfessel

Methfessel returned to Rudolstadt in 1810, and spent the next twelve years as a Kammersänger and chamber musician at the Rudolstadt court. He became a particular friend of Louis Spohr, and along with three other friends they wandered together in 1818 from town to town towards the music festival at Mannheim. At Mannheim the "Travelers" were given welcome as celebrities, Spohr in particular. Spohr, then at the height of his fame, was offered a private apartment but turned it down so he could be with his friend Methfessel. Methfessel turned down a position in Prague as Kapellmeister, to which he had been recommended by Carl Maria von Weber, but 1822 saw him relocated to Hamburg as a director of music, where he also added teaching to his duties. He founded in 1823 the Hamburger Liedertafel, the first men's choir in the city. From 1825 to 1832 he was a traveling musician whose income was insecure, until such time as he decided to settle into stable employment.

Methfessel became Kapellmeister at Braunschweig in 1832, a position which he held until 1842. He married a singer, Louise Emilie Lehmann (1815–1854), in 1834. As Kapellmeister, one of his principal aims was to improve the quality of opera performances. He also spent some of this time as a music teacher, including piano. He was forced to resign his position of Kapellmeister as he developed a severe hearing impairment. For the rest of his life Methfessel was self-employed as a composer, music critic, and writing on music theory, although he did receive a small pension from his previous court position.

== Later life ==
His wife's death in May 1854 was particularly hard on him. His sight became very weak, but his mind remained at full strength despite the loss of use of both ears and eyes. He was the composer-in-residence at the 1861 Great German Song Festival in Nuremberg, and the 1865 German Signing Association in Dresden. The city of Braunschweig held a celebration day honoring his 80th birthday on 6 October 1864. The University of Jena took the occasion to confer a Doctor of Philosophy upon him.

Age and financial difficulties eventually compelled Methfessel to leave Braunschweig in May 1868 and move to the village Heckenbeck of town Bad Gandersheim to live with his eldest daughter. That August he suffered a severe stroke, which removed his remaining hearing and sight, and left him with little ability to speak. However, by mid-September his heath improved such that he was again able to correspond with friends and even sing. Methfessel died on 23 March 1869 in Heckenbeck, and he was buried in the village cemetery.

== Assessment ==
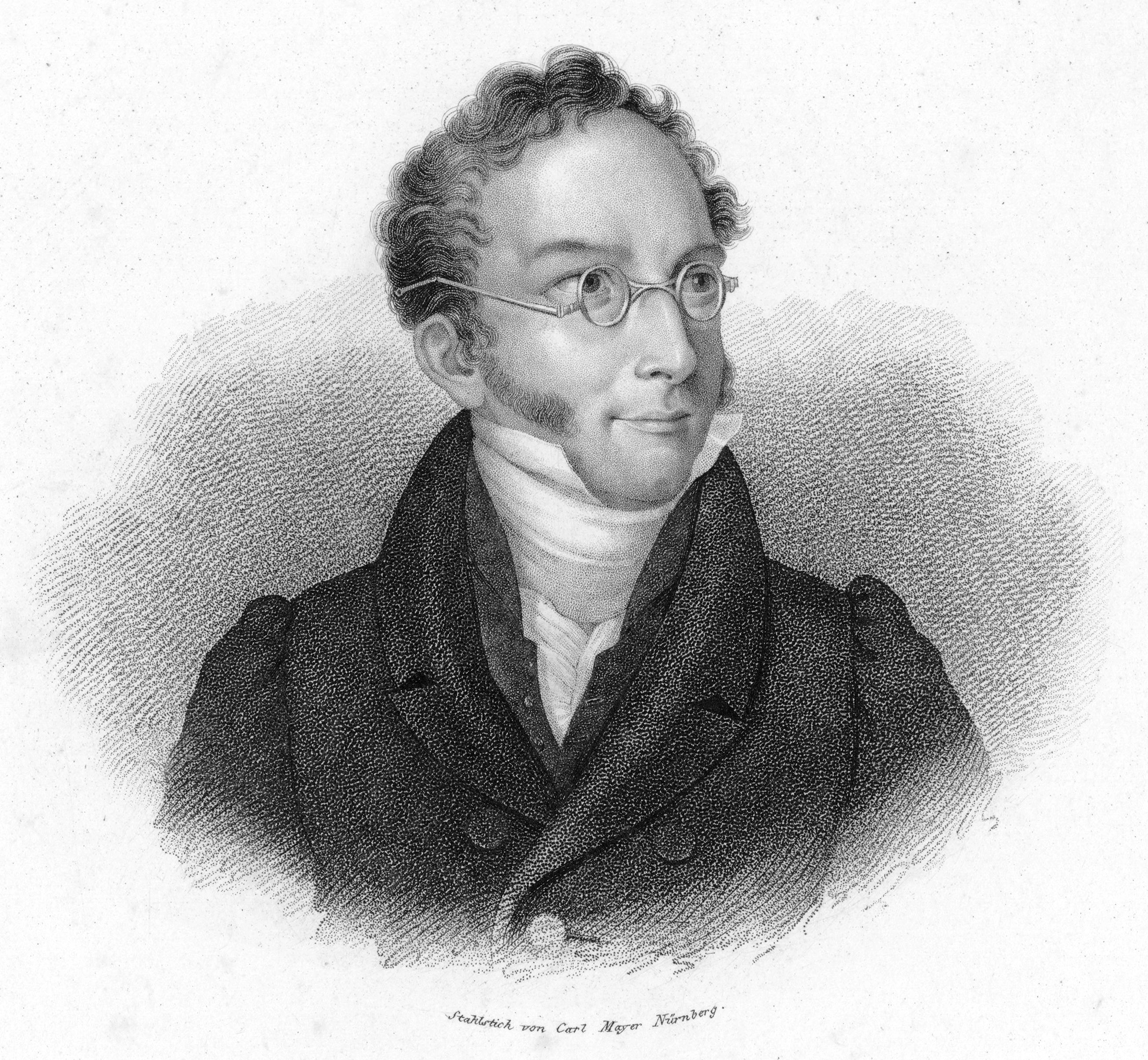
Portrait of Methfessel from the Bibliothèque nationale de France

With his solo voice and choral compositions, Methfessel was a key figure, not only of German folk singing in the 19th century, but of popular singing of the male voice in general. Many of his songs, in particular patriotic songs included in the five editions of "Allgemeinen Commers- und Liederbuch", were considered the model for student songs. His songs were described by his contemporaries as "fresh, singable, pleasant, and pleasing". The instrumental accompaniment for his songs have no independence to the melody, merely supplying simple harmonic support to the vocalist. He wrote several pieces of instrumental music, but the reputation of this output suffers in comparison to his vocal works.

Methfessel was an "exquisite" singer, even preceding his formal training. In addition to his singing, he was a highly accomplished pianist and guitarist. He was a serious student of both theology and music, yet he was popular with his peers and society in general because of his personal integrity and his genial personality. Even upon the loss of his wife, his hearing, and his sight he was known for his cheerfulness.

== Works ==
Many of Methfessel's songs were scored for guitar accompaniment. A large part of his output is for a solo vocalist. His part-songs for male voices remained in the German choral repertoire long after his death. His setting of "Stadt Hamburg an der Elbe Auen" became the national song of Hamburg. The settings for his vocal pieces range from the sacred to the comic. His most resounding works celebrate patriotism, friendship, freedom, and love.

In addition to his vocal works, he wrote instrumental music for guitar, organ, piano, and glass harmonica.

=== Operas ===
- The Prince of Basra

=== Oratorios ===
- Das befreite Jerusalem
