= Rhine crisis =

Diplomatic crisis between France and the German Confederation (1840/41)

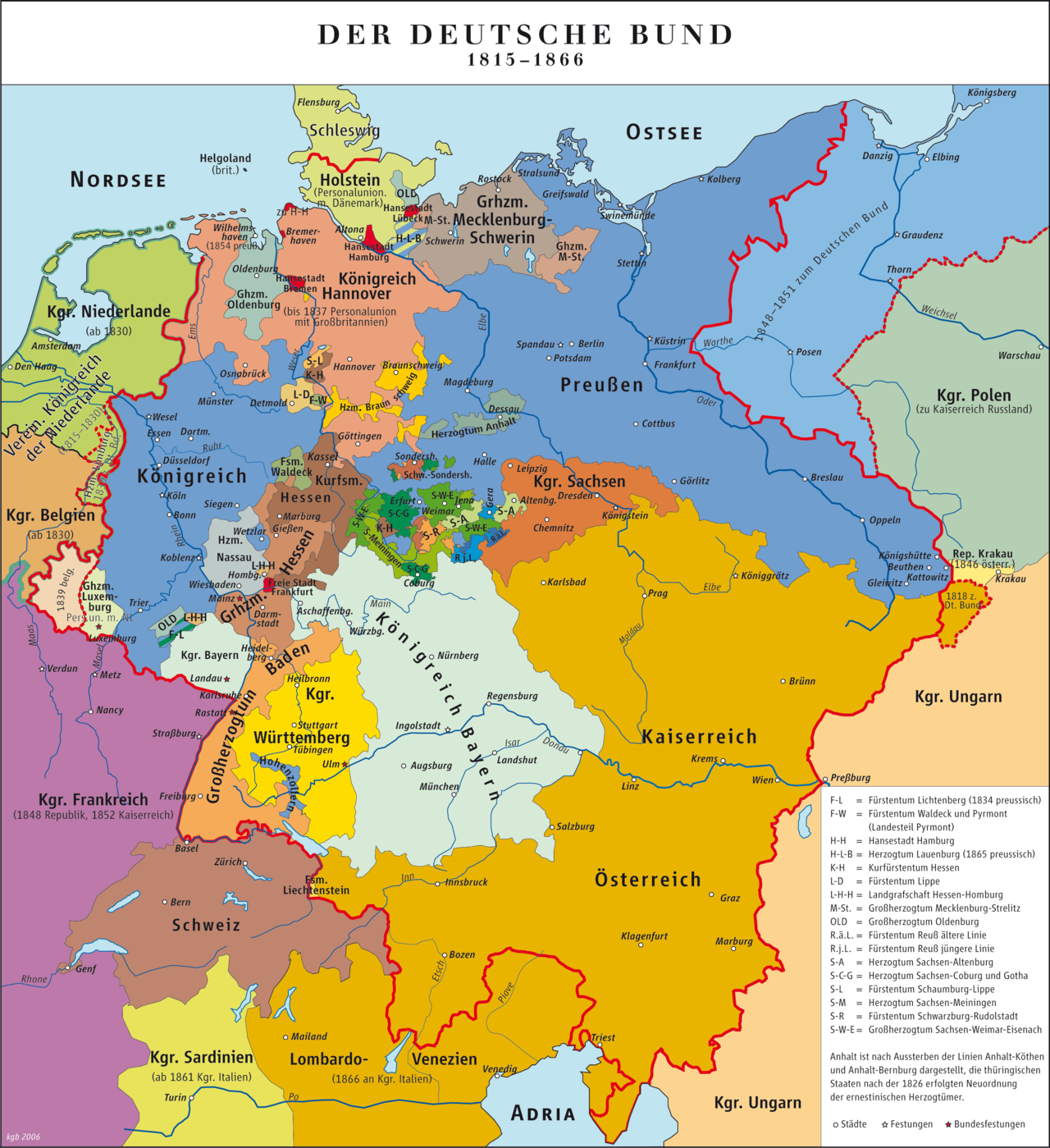
Borders of the German Confederation, c. 1840

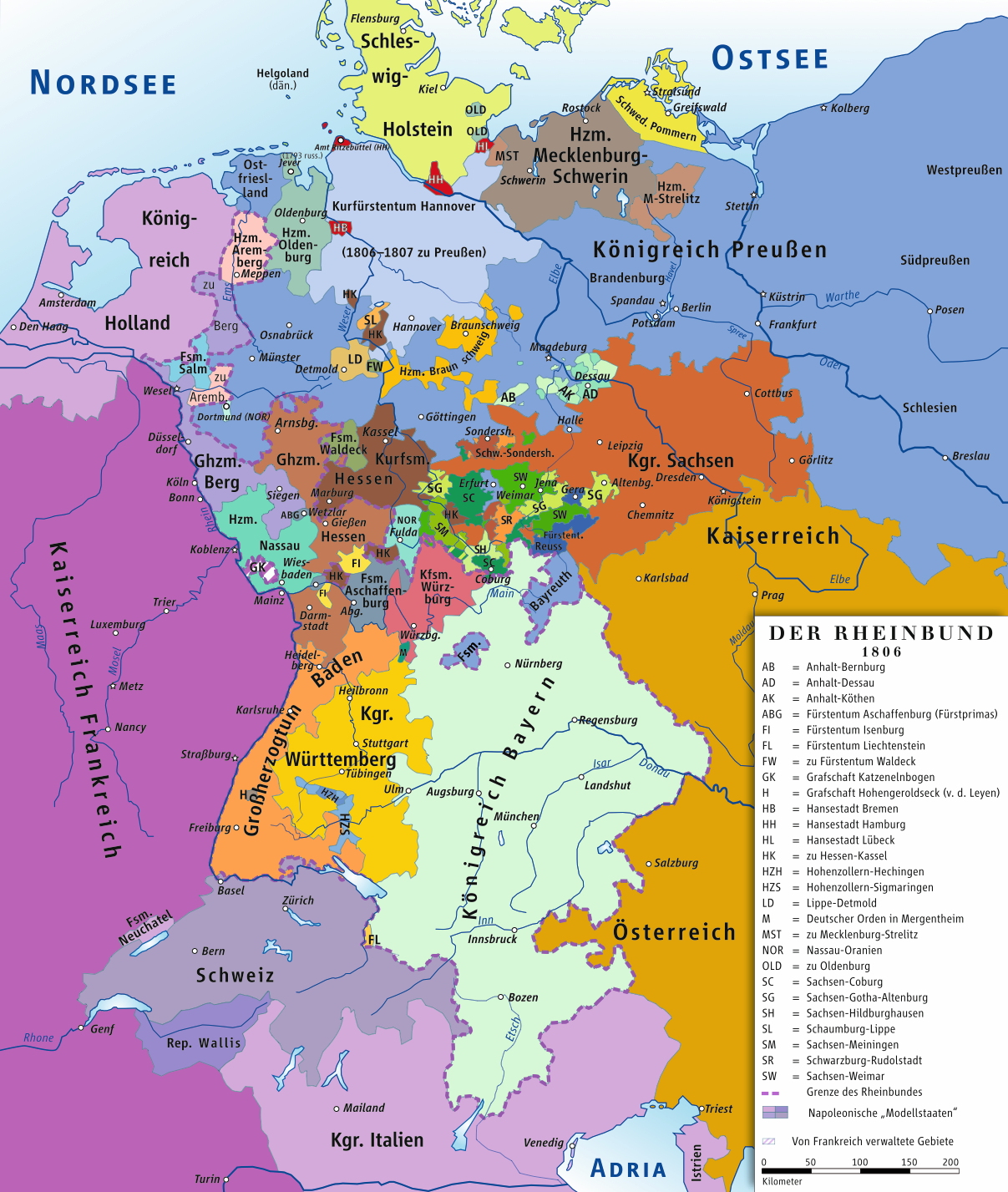
The Rhine as France's eastern border, 1806

The Rhine crisis of 1840 was a diplomatic crisis between the Kingdom of France and the German Confederation, caused by the demand by French minister Adolphe Thiers that the river Rhine be reinstated as France's border in the east, at a loss of some 32,000 km^{2} (12,000 sq mi) of German territory.

The territories of the Left Bank of the Rhine, which French troops had conquered in 1795 and formally annexed in 1797, had been returned to German (mostly Prussian) control after the 1815 Congress of Vienna, forming the Rhine Province. After a diplomatic defeat in the Oriental Crisis of 1840 France shifted its focus to the Rhine, and the French government, led by Adolphe Thiers, restated its claim to areas on the left bank, to re-establish the Rhine as a natural border between France and Germany. These claims stoked resentment among the Germans against the French, and increased nationalism on both sides. New nationalist songs were written in France and Germany and achieved huge popularity, most famously the German songs "Die Wacht am Rhein", "Der Deutsche Rhein" and the "Lied der Deutschen" (the national anthem of Germany since 1922). In the end, the crisis passed peacefully, when Thiers resigned as prime minister and a more conciliatory government was installed in France.

== Background ==
=== Oriental Crisis of 1840 ===
Muhammad Ali's Territory. Dark Green - Egypt 1805. Light Green - Acquisitions in 1840. Striped - Controlled during the Greek War of Independence

The Greek War of Independence and the Russo-Turkish War (1828–29) had considerably weakened the Ottoman Empire. In 1831, Muhammad Ali of Egypt (Wali of Ottoman Egypt), technically a vassal of the Ottoman Sultan but in practice exercising considerable independence, demanded control of Greater Syria (constituting much of the Levant) from the Sultan as compensation for his assistance during the Greek war. Egyptian troops moved into Palestine and Syria, reaching Anatolia by 1832 before being stopped by the threat of Great Power intervention to protect the Sultan, though Muhammad Ali kept control of Syria. France had taken the Turkish defeat in the Greek War of Independence as an opportunity to occupy Algeria, previously also nominally an Ottoman vassal, in 1830, and had aligned themselves closely with Muhammad Ali throughout the 1830s, as part of a strategy to expand their Mediterranean influence.

In June 1839, Ottoman troops sought to reoccupy the lands they had ceded in 1833, but were badly defeated on June 24, followed shortly by the Sultan Mahmud II's death from tuberculosis on July 1. The Ottoman Navy defected to Muhammad Ali, threatening the collapse of the empire. The United Kingdom, Prussia, and Austria feared that destabilization in the Ottoman Empire would lead to increased influence for Russia over the Dardanelles and Balkans. Russia also viewed the total collapse of the Ottoman Empire as too risky and had followed a policy of increasing its influence by helping prop up the existing regime. Accordingly, these four powers signed the 1840 Convention of London, on July 15, 1840, effectively an ultimatum against Muhammad Ali to withdraw from Syria and submit to the new Sultan Abdulmejid I. France was taken by surprise when the other four powers moved forward without French input on the agreement.

=== French political situation ===
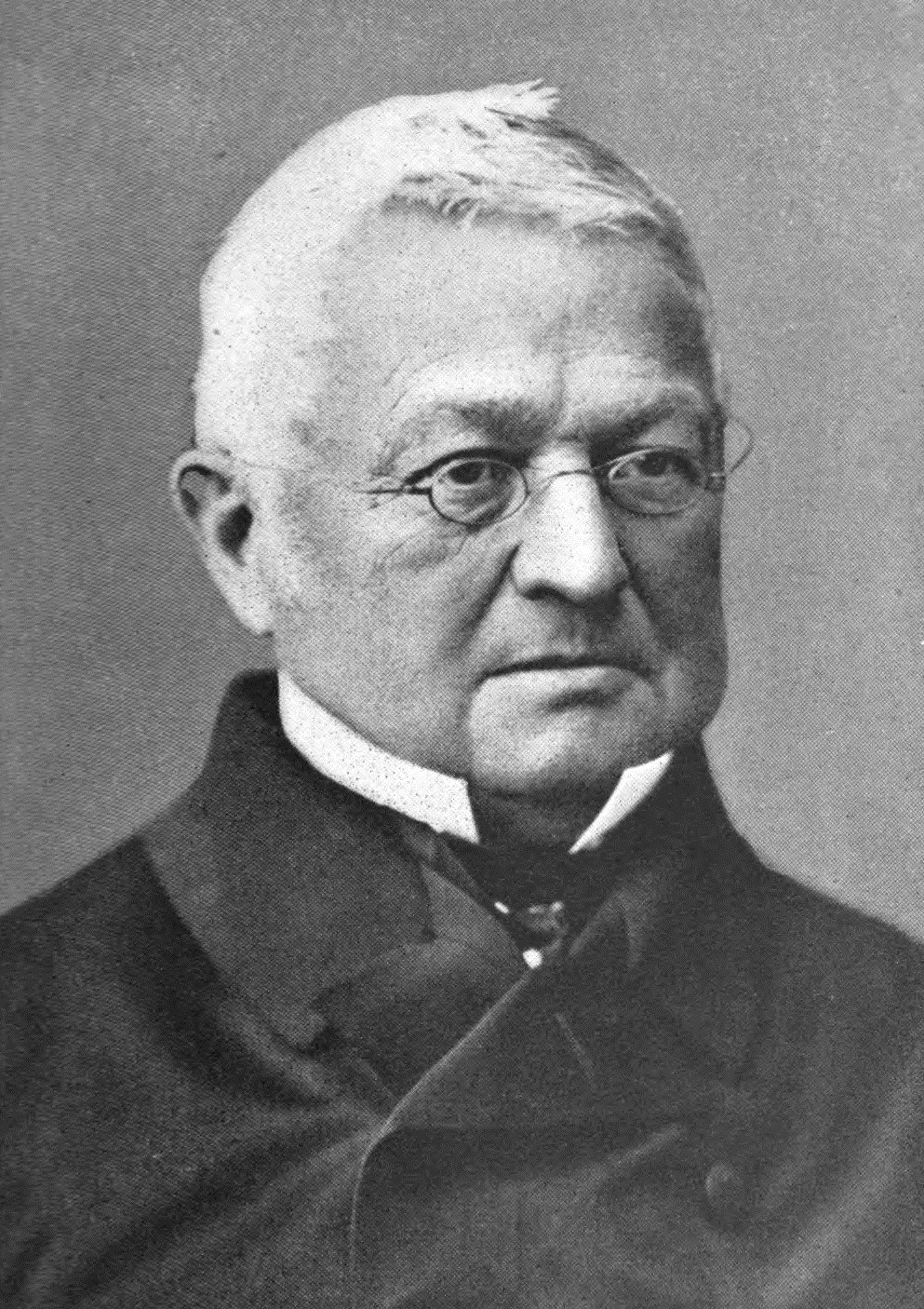
Adolphe Thiers in the 1870s

The politics of the July Monarchy in France in the late 1830s were very unstable. The regime of King Louis-Philippe I faced opposition from Legitimists who sought the restoration of the senior Bourbon line to the throne, Bonapartists who sought a restoration of Napoleon's line to the throne, and Republicans who pushed for an end to monarchy in favor of a republic.

In elections in March 1839, a coalition of leftists and nationalists won a clear majority in the Chamber of Deputies. However, disputes among the factions of the left and efforts by the king to reduce the influence of anti-monarchical parties prevented a new cabinet from forming until a failed republican insurrection in May led to a new government led by Marshal Soult, a firm supporter of the Louis-Philippe. However, the Soult-led government fell only nine months later on a relatively minor vote concerning a proposed dowry for the King's second son, Prince Louis, Duke of Nemours.

Soult was succeeded as prime minister by Adolphe Thiers. Disliked by Louis-Philippe, Thiers was a strong supporter of parliamentarization, he was associated with revolutionary and nationalist causes because of his leading role in the July Revolution and his historical writings on the French Revolution and Napoleonic era. He had recently adopted a strongly nationalist tone in parliamentary debates and made references to national honor and the nationalist enthusiasm of the revolutionary period. A coup attempt by Louis Napoleon in August 1840 failed, but further illustrated the instability of the domestic political situation in France.

=== Belgian-Luxembourg settlement ===
A further factor contributing to the Rhine crisis was the final settlement of the Belgian-Luxembourg question in 1839. When the Belgian Revolution 1830 separated Belgium from the United Kingdom of the Netherlands, Luxembourg, a member of the German Confederation in a personal union with the Kingdom of the Netherlands, lost over half its territory. This division was cemented in the Treaty of London (1839). Although the lost territory was populated mainly by non-Germans, many German nationalists were upset by the failure of the Confederation to prevent the loss of its territory and were highly attuned to the threat of further territorial losses in the west.

== Crisis ==
=== French demands ===
In France, the surprise announcement of the Convention of London signed by the other four Great Powers on July 15 was viewed as a renewal of the grand anti-French coalitions that had been victorious in 1814 and 1815. The exclusion of France was seen as a foreign policy crisis by nationalists and public opinion swung in a nationalistic direction amidst talk of a "diplomatic Waterloo". Starting with the liberal newspaper Le Constitutionnel on August 1, 1840, demands for a foray to the Rhine spread along with calls for territorial "compensation" for the perceived snub and the defeat of France's ally in Egypt. Similar calls quickly spread to Bonapartist and Legitimist newspapers. As had happened during the July Revolution in 1830, there were loud calls for revision of the 1815 treaties and a revival of the militant nationalism that had dominated the Revolutionary period.

Although Thiers and Louis-Philippe knew France was not prepared for war, much less a war against an alliance of the four Great Powers, they also recognized that the popular outrage represented a threat to the government and the monarchy. With the king's support, Thiers resorted to a bluff: he publicly called for the restoration of the Rhine frontier and the reannexation of the Left Bank of the Rhine. In support of this demand, he called up reservists on August 5, 1840, mobilized forces near the border, he issued a government loan for armaments purposed, and began a massive fortification project around Paris. Thiers hoped that Muhammad Ali would be able to hold out in Syria while France pressed for a renegotiated settlement.

=== German reaction ===
On the German side, a similar wave of nationalist excitement arose in response. Particularly in the western states of the German Confederation, Francophobia and war hysteria were rampant in the press. Some demanded the reconquest of Alsace and Lorraine (border regions with large German-speaking populations) from France in response. Elsewhere the response was more muted, particularly further from the border, but the power of the German nationalist idea was seen in the outcry. Just as French nationalists questioned the justice of the 1815 settlements, some Germans questioned the decision to forego significant territorial concessions from France after the Napoleonic wars, with some calls for annexing Switzerland as well as French border fortifications.

The crisis resulted in a significant shift among German liberals. Before 1840, Germany liberals were fairly Francophilic and willing to put political freedom above national unity — many had spent time in exile in France, the French Revolution and July Revolution were often viewed as models to be followed, and French writers and theorists were heavily influential. The Rhine crisis changed the view of France from a continental bastion of liberal parliamentarianism to focus on the militaristic and chauvinistic elements of the revolutionary spirit, turning many German liberals away from France and toward a more nationalist-liberal view, which was highly influential in the German revolutions of 1848–1849.

The weaknesses of the German military under the Confederation received significant attention. Relying on the contribution of troops, equipment, and funds from all Confederation states, coordinating the German Federal Army was very difficult and the small states were heavily reliant on the two German Great Powers of Prussia and Austria, each of whom had their own foreign policy goals independent of the Confederation. With the weakness brought into sharp focus by France's sabre-rattling in the west, calls for further integration in the Confederation gained some strength. Some steps were taken to increase military preparedness and strengthen cooperation. The new King of Prussia, Frederick William IV, proposed an expansion of the German Confederation's military and improvements to the fortifications of Mainz, Ulm, and Rastatt, while the Kingdom of Bavaria built the fortress at Germersheim. Prussia and Austria also agreed to a military union in the case of a French attack. However, further moves toward German unity were not pursued by the conservative leaders and the rulers of smalls states continued to defend their independence.

=== Deescalation and resolution ===
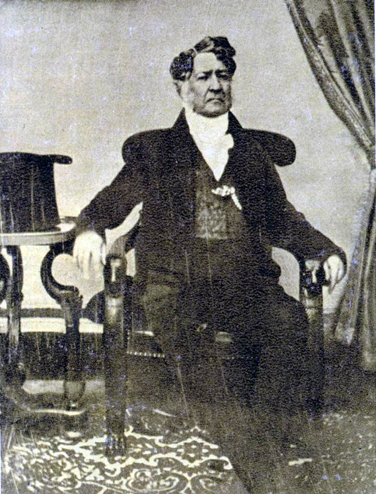
King Louis Philippe in the 1840s

The King made it clear to Thiers that he wanted peace, a position backed by many in the Cabinet due to the poor state of military preparedness and the continuing military efforts in Algeria. Thiers offered to resign, but the king refused his resignation, arguing that he wanted the British to believe that France would fight. And indeed, the combined British and Austrian Fleets, after blockading the Nile delta, did not attack Egypt, but moved east to the ports of Syria. In September 1840, joint British, Austrian, and Ottoman forces bombarded and captured several Syrian ports from the Egyptians and Muhammad Ali's military position in the Levant became untenable.

In October, the King struck several Thiers-drafted lines he deemed too confrontational from his annual address to the Chamber of Deputies and Thiers tendered his resignation again which was accepted on October 29, 1840.

Thiers was succeeded by his predecessor, Marshal Soult, whose government struck a more conciliatory line with the other Great Powers, dropping any demand for territorial concession in Europe and actively seeking to rejoin the Concert of Europe. Despite overwhelming military superiority, the Great Powers declined to depose Muhammad Ali in Egypt and while the settlement revoked his earlier gains in Syria and reduced his army and navy, it reaffirmed his position in Egypt and made it hereditary, though subject to the Ottoman throne.

The new cabinet, with Guizot as Secretary of State, sailed a more conciliatory course, and all five Great Powers signed the London Straits Convention (13 July 1841) settled the matter of the Dardanelles, defusing tension in Europe.

== Consequences and significance ==
Once the threat of a general European war was lifted, the Rhine crisis's immediate impact was fairly limited outside of French internal politics. France dropped its demand for the Left Bank of the Rhine and the aggressive government was replaced with more conservative leadership which brought France back into the Concert of Europe. Within France, apart from bringing down the Thiers government, the episode illustrated popular disappointment with France's failure to live up to the national and military ideals of the Revolutionary and Napoleonic period, which is sometimes cited as contributing to the downfall of the July Monarchy in 1848 and the return of the Napoleonic dynasty to power.

However, the most significant long-term impact of the crisis was the explosion of national sentiment in Germany. Previously the province of intellectuals and other elites, the Rhine crisis saw expressions of German nationalist sentiment across social classes. It also generated significant anti-French sentiment and helped tie together German nationalism with Francophobia and diminished the amity between German and French liberals. The nationalist response to the Crisis also laid the ground for the sharp responses of Prussia to the Schleswig-Holstein Question and the Luxembourg Crisis and the threat that further territory would be lost from the Confederation. The consequences of the Rhine crisis in Germany were described thus by Heinrich Heine: "Thiers drummed our fatherland into this great movement which awakened political life in Germany; Thiers brought us back on our feet as a nation."

=== Poetry and music ===
The conflict gave rise to an explosion of patriotic and nationalist poetry on both sides. On the German side, the Rheinliedbewegung (Rhine-song movement) brought forth thousands of poems with such titles as "You shall not have it, the free German Rhine" and "Die Wacht am Rhein" ("The Watch on the Rhine"). Such poems were published in nearly every newspaper with the most successful reprinted across the country and set to music, some many different times by some of the most successful composers of the day. The French responded with their own poems such as the ironic "The German Rhine" (Le rhin allemand) and "La Teutomanie." In 1842 Victor Hugo wrote "Le Rhin" a travel book which ends with a call for France to extend its borders to the Rhine.

== See also ==
- French–German enmity
